= Booker (name) =

Booker is both a surname and a given name. Notable people with the name include:

== Surname ==
- Austin Booker (born 2002), American football player
- Bob Booker (born 1958), English footballer
- Charles Booker (American politician) (born 1984), member of the Kentucky House of Representatives
- Charles Booker (Australian politician) (1865–1925), member of the Queensland Legislative Assembly
- Charles Dawson Booker (1897–1918), English World War I ace fighter pilot
- Charles Goodenough Booker (1859–1926), Canadian politician, mayor of Hamilton, Ontario
- Chris Booker (born 1971), American radio and television personality
- Chris Booker (baseball) (born 1976), American former Major League Baseball pitcher
- Chris Booker (basketball) (born 1981), American former basketball player
- Christopher Booker (1937–2019), English journalist and author
- Cory Booker (born 1969), American politician, U.S. Senator from New Jersey and former mayor of Newark, New Jersey
- Devin Booker (born 1996), American basketball player in the NBA
- Devin Booker (basketball, born 1991), American basketball player
- Devontae Booker (born 1991), American football player
- Eddie Booker (1917–1975), American boxer
- Edmund Booker (1719–1793), Virginia planter and politician
- Eric Booker (born 1969), American hip-hop artist and competitive eater
- Eric Booker (golfer) (born 1963), American professional golfer
- Frank Booker (basketball, born 1964) (1964–2026), American basketball player
- Frank Aron Booker (born 1994), American-Icelandic basketball player, son of Frank
- George Booker (1821–1883) of Virginia, American politician, lawyer, teacher, judge
- Hassan Booker (born 1975), American basketball player and coach
- James Booker (1939–1983), American pianist and singer
- Joseph Albert Booker (1859–1926), American newspaper editor, academic administrator, Baptist minister, and Black community leader
- Kenny Booker (born 1948), American basketball player
- Lorenzo Booker (born 1984), American football running back
- Madison Booker (born 2005), American women's basketball player
- Marty Booker (born 1976), American football wide receiver
- Michael Dennis Booker, American lawyer and politician
- Peter Jeffrey Booker (1924–2011), British engineer and technological-drawing historian
- Robert D. Booker (1920–1943), United States Army soldier and Medal of Honor recipient
- Robert Booker (politician) (born 1962), American historian, author, and politician
- Rod Booker (born 1958), American professional baseball player
- Squire Booker (born 1965), American biochemist
- Thomas Booker (born 1999), American football player
- Tre' Booker, American dancer
- Trevor Booker (born 1987), American basketball player
- Trevor Booker (footballer) (born 1969), English former footballer
- Tyler Booker (born 2004), American football player
- Xavier Booker (born 2004), American basketball player

== Given name ==
- Booker Brown (1952–2022), American football offensive tackle
- Booker Dalton (1869–1948), American politician from Virginia
- Booker Ervin (1930–1970), American jazz tenor saxophone player
- Booker T (wrestler) (born 1965), American professional wrestler
- Booker T. Jones (born 1944), American multi-instrumentalist, songwriter, record producer and arranger
- Booker Little (1938–1961), American jazz trumpet player
- Booker T. Washington (1856–1915), American educator, author, orator, and advisor

== See also ==
- Booker T (disambiguation)
