= Luxembourgish phonology =

Sounds and pronunciation of the Luxembourgish language

This article aims to describe the phonology and phonetics of central Luxembourgish, which is regarded as the emerging standard.

== Consonants ==
The consonant inventory of Luxembourgish is quite similar to that of Standard German.

Consonant phonemes of Luxembourgish
		Labial	Alveolar	Palatal (-alveolar)	Dorsal	Glottal
Nasal		m	n		ŋ	
Plosive	fortis	p	t		k	
Plosive	lenis	b	d		ɡ	
Affricate	fortis	(pf)	ts	tʃ		
Affricate	lenis		(dz)	(dʒ)		
Fricative	fortis	f	s	ʃ	χ	h
Fricative	lenis	v	z	ʒ	ʁ	
Sonorant			l	j	ʀ	

- /pf/ occurs only in loanwords from Standard German. Just as among many native German-speakers, it tends to be simplified to [f] word-initially. For example, Pflicht ('obligation') is pronounced [fliɕt], or in careful speech [pfliɕt].
  - /v/ is realized as [w] when it occurs after /k, ts, ʃ/, e.g. zwee [tsweː] ('two').
- /p, t, k/ are voiceless fortis [p, t, k]. They are aspirated [pʰ, tʰ, kʰ] in most positions, but not when /s/ or /ʃ/ precedes in the same syllable, or when another plosive or affricate follows. The fortis affricates are unaspirated and thus contrast with the lenis ones by voicing alone.
  - If followed by a vowel, the fortis stops are moved to the onset of the following syllable and voiced to [b, d, ɡ]; see below.
- /b, d, ɡ/ are unaspirated lenis, more often voiceless [b̥, d̥, ɡ̊] than voiced [b, d, ɡ]. The lenis affricates are truly voiced.
- /dz/ as a phoneme appears only in a few words, such as spadséieren /ʃpɑˈdzəɪ̯eren/ ('to go for a walk'). /dʒ/ as a phoneme occurs only in loanwords from English.
  - Phonetic [dz] and [dʒ] occur due to voicing of word-final /ts/ and /tʃ/; see below.
- /s/ and /z/ only contrast between vowels. /s/ does not occur word-initially except in French and English loanwords. In the oldest loans from French it is often replaced with /ts/.
  - /j/ is frequently realized as [ʒ], e.g. Juni [ˈjuːniː] or [ˈʒuːniː] ('June').
  - The normal realization of /ʀ/ is more often a trill [ʀ] than a fricative [ʁ]. The fricative variant is used after short vowels before consonants. If the consonant is voiceless, the fricative is also voiceless, i.e. [χ]. Older speakers use the consonantal variant [ʀ ~ ʁ] also in the word-final position, where younger speakers tend to vocalize the /ʀ/ to [ɐ], as in German and Danish.
- /χ, ʁ/ have two sets of allophones: alveolo-palatal [ɕ, ʑ] and uvular [χ, ʁ]. The latter occur after back vowels, whereas the former occur in all other positions.
  - The [ʑ] allophone appears only in a few words intervocalically, e.g. Spigel [ˈʃpiʑəl] ('mirror'), héijen [ˈhəɪ̯ʑən] (inflected form of héich [ˈhəɪ̯ɕ] 'high'). An increasing number of speakers do not distinguish between the alveolo-palatal [ɕ, ʑ] and the postalveolar [ʃ, ʒ].

Morpheme-final /n/ undergoes both internal and external sandhi: it is deleted unless followed by a vowel, a homorganic (i.e. apical) noncontinuant, i.e. [n t d ts dz tʃ dʒ], or [h]. Furthermore, some unusual consonant clusters may arise post-lexically after cliticisation of the definite article d' (for feminine, neuter and plural forms), e.g. d'Land /dlɑnt/ ('the country') or d'Kräiz /tkræːɪ̯ts/ ('the cross'). Due to cluster simplification this article often disappears entirely between consonants.

=== Word-final obstruents ===
In the word-final position the contrast between the voiceless /p, t, tʃ, k, f, s, ʃ, χ/ on the one hand and the voiced /b, d, dʒ, ɡ, v, z, ʒ, ʁ/ on the other is neutralized in favor of the former, unless a word-initial vowel follows in which case the obstruent is voiced and are resyllabified, that is, moved to the onset of the first syllable of the next word (the same happens with /ts/, which becomes [dz], and the non-native affricate /pf/, which is also voiced to [bv]). For instance, sech eens (phonemically /zeχ ˈeːns/) is pronounced [zəˈʑeːns], although this article transcribes it [zəʑ ˈeːns] so that it corresponds more closely to the spelling. Similarly, eng interessant Iddi is pronounced [æŋ intʀæˈsɑnd ˈidi] ('an interesting idea'), with a voiced [d].

=== Pronunciation of the letter g ===
In Luxembourgish, the letter g has no fewer than nine possible pronunciations, depending both on the origin of a word and the phonetic environment. Natively, it is pronounced [ɡ] initially and [ʁ ~ ʑ] elsewhere, the latter being devoiced to [χ ~ ɕ] at the end of a morpheme. Words from French, English and (in a few cases) German have introduced [ɡ] (devoiced [k]) in other environments, and French orthography's "soft g" indicates [ʒ] (devoiced [ʃ]). By the now very common mergers of [ʒ] and [ʑ], as well as [ʃ] and [ɕ], this number may be reduced to seven, however.

In the unstressed intervocalic position when simultaneously following [ə, i̯ə, u̯ə] and preceding [ə] or [ɐ], [ʑ] may lose its friction and become an approximant [j], as in bëllegen [ˈbələjən] 'cheap (infl.)'. This is generally not obligatory.

Summary of pronunciation of ⟨g⟩
Phoneme	Allophone	Applies in	Phonetic environment	Example	IPA	Meaning
/ɡ/	[ɡ]	native and German words	stem-initially	géi	[ɡəɪ̯]	go
/ɡ/	[ɡ]	some German words	stem-internally	Drogen	[ˈdʀoːɡən]	drugs
/ɡ/	[ɡ]	French words	stem-initially and internally before orthographic a, o, u or consonant	Negatioun	[neɡɑˈsjəʊ̯n]	negation
/k/	[k]	French and some German words	word-finally	Drog	[dʀoːk]	drug
/ʒ/	[ʒ]	French words	stem-initially and internally before orthographic e, i, y	originell	[oʀiʒiˈnæl]	original
/ʃ/	[ʃ]	French words	word-finally before mute e	Plage	[plaːʃ]	beach
/ʁ/	[ʁ]	native and most German words	stem-internally after back vowels (including /aː/)	Lager	[ˈlaːʁɐ]	store
/ʁ/	[ʑ]	native and most German words	stem-internally after consonants and non-back vowels	Verfügung	[fɐˈfyːʑuŋ]	disposal
/ʁ/	[j]	native and most German words	when both unstressed and intervocalic between [ə, i̯ə, u̯ə] and [ə, ɐ]	bëllegen	[ˈbələjən]	cheap (inflected)
/χ/	[χ]	native and most German words	word-finally after back vowels (including /aː/)	Dag	[daːχ]	day
/χ/	[ɕ]	native and most German words	word-finally after consonants and non-back vowels	bëlleg	[ˈbələɕ]	cheap

== Vowels ==
Native monophthongs of Luxembourgish, from Gilles & Trouvain (2013:70)

Part 1 of native diphthongs of Luxembourgish, from Gilles & Trouvain (2013:71)

Part 2 of native diphthongs of Luxembourgish, from Gilles & Trouvain (2013:71)

Native vowels
		Front		Central	Back	
		short	long	Central	short	long
Close		i	iː		u	uː
Close-mid		e	eː	ə	o	oː
Open-mid			ɛː	ɐ		
Open		æ	aː		ɑ	
Diphthongs	closing	əɪ̯ əʊ̯ æːɪ̯ æːʊ̯ ɑɪ̯ ɑʊ̯				
Diphthongs	centering	i̯ə u̯ə				
Diphthongs	opening	iːɐ̯ uːɐ̯ ɛːɐ̯ oːɐ̯				

Non-native vowels
	Front	
rounded
	short	long
Close	y	yː
Close-mid		øː
Open-mid	(œ)	œː
Nasal vowels	õː ɛ̃ː ɑ̃ː	
Diphthongs	closing	oɪ̯
Diphthongs	opening	yːɐ̯ øːɐ̯

- /i, iː, u, uː, o/ are close to the corresponding cardinal vowels [i, u, o].
  - Some speakers may realize /o/ as open-mid [ɔ], especially before /r/.
- /e/ is most usually realized as a mid central vowel with slight rounding ([ə̹]). Before velars, it is fronted and unrounded to [e], though this is sometimes as open as [ɛ]. Contrary to Standard German, the sequence of [ə] and a sonorant never results in a syllabic sonorant; however, Standard German spoken in Luxembourg often also lacks syllabic sonorants, so that e.g. tragen is pronounced [ˈtʀaːɡən], rather than [ˈtʀaːɡŋ̍].
- /eː, oː/ are higher than close-mid [e̝ː, o̝ː] and may be even as high as /i, u/.
  - Before /r/, /eː/ is realized as open-mid [ɛː].
- The quality of /æ/ matches the prototypical IPA value of the ⟨æ⟩ symbol ([æ]).
- [ɐ] is the realization of a non-prevocalic, unstressed sequence /er/.
- /ɑ/ is near-open [ɑ̝].
- /aː/, a phonological back vowel (the long counterpart of /ɑ/), is phonetically near-front [a̠ː]. Sometimes, it may be as front and as high as /æ/ ([æː]), though without losing its length.
- The nasal vowels appear only in loanwords from French, whereas the oral front rounded vowels appear in loans from both French and German.
  - The opposition between close-mid and open-mid vowels does not exist in native Luxembourgish words. In non-native words, there is a marginal contrast between the close-mid /øː/ and the open-mid /œː/.
  - The short non-native /œ/ is distinct from the [ə] allophone of /e/ only on a phonemic level, as the latter is fronted and unrounded to [e] before velars (cf. the surname Böcker /ˈbœker/). In other positions, they are perceived as the same sound, as shown in the spelling of the word ëffentlech [ˈœfəntleɕ] 'public' (loaned from German öffentlich [ˈœfn̩tlɪç], meaning the same). The Luxembourgish/German name of Cologne, Köln, is pronounced as if spelled Këln, that is [ˈkəln], phonemically simply /ˈkeln/ (German /ɪ/ and /ɛ/ are nativized as /i/ and /æ/ in Luxembourgish, keeping all three sounds distinct). For this reason, it is not differentiated from [ə] in phonetic transcription (so that Böcker is transcribed [ˈbəkɐ]). The long counterpart of this sound is transcribed with ⟨œː⟩ in both types of transcription, which does not imply a difference in quality.
- The starting points of /əɪ̯, əʊ̯/ are typically schwa-like [ə], but the first element of /əɪ̯/ may be more of a centralized front vowel [ë̞].
- The starting points of /æːɪ̯, æːʊ̯/, /ɑɪ̯, ɑʊ̯/ as well as /i̯ə/ and /u̯ə/ are similar to the corresponding short monophthongs [æ, ɑ, i, u].
  - The first elements of /æːɪ̯, æːʊ̯/ may be phonetically short [æ] in fast speech or in unstressed syllables.
- The centering diphthongs /i̯ə, u̯ə/ end in the mid central unrounded area [ə]. This schwa is usually not non-syllabic, as the diphthongs are typically realized as rising [i̯ə, u̯ə], i.e. as more or less inverted versions of /əɪ̯, əʊ̯/.
- /oɪ̯/ appears only in loanwords from Standard German.

The /æːɪ̯ ~ ɑɪ̯/ and /æːʊ̯ ~ ɑʊ̯/ contrasts arose from a former lexical tone contrast: the shorter /ɑɪ̯, ɑʊ̯/ were used in words with Accent 1, whereas the lengthened /æːɪ̯, æːʊ̯/ were used in words with Accent 2 (see Pitch-accent language.) The contrast between the two sets of diphthongs is only partially encoded in orthography, so that the fronting /ɑɪ̯, æːɪ̯/ are differentiated as ⟨ei⟩ or ⟨ai⟩ vs. ⟨äi⟩, whereas ⟨au⟩ can stand for either /ɑʊ̯/ or /æːʊ̯/. The difference is phonemic in both cases and there are minimal pairs such as fein /fɑɪ̯n/ 'elevated' vs. fäin /fæːɪ̯n/ 'decent' and faul /fɑʊ̯l/ 'rotten' vs. faul /fæːʊ̯l/ 'lazy'. The diphthongs contrast mainly in monosyllabics. In penultimate syllables, the short /ɑɪ̯, ɑʊ̯/ occur mainly before voiced consonants and in hiatus, whereas the long /æːɪ̯, æːʊ̯/ occur mainly before voiceless consonants (including phonetically voiceless consonants that are voiced in their underlying form). The last traces of the dative forms of nouns show a shortening from /æːɪ̯, æːʊ̯/ to /ɑɪ̯, ɑʊ̯/; compare the nominative forms Läif /læːɪ̯f/ 'body' and Haus /hæːʊ̯s/ 'house' with the corresponding dative forms Leif /lɑɪ̯f/ and Haus /hɑʊ̯s/.

Additional phonetic diphthongs [iːɐ̯, uːɐ̯, oːɐ̯, ɛːɐ̯] arise after vocalisation of /r/ after long vowels. In loanwords from Standard German (such as Lürmann and Röhr) [yːɐ̯] and [øːɐ̯] also occur. The sequence /aːr/ is monophthongized to [aː], unless a vowel follows within the same word. It is also sporadically retained in the environments where it is vocalized after other long vowels, which is why the merger with the monophthong [aː] is assumed to be phonetic, rather than phonemic. This variation is not encoded in transcriptions in this article, where the phonetic output of /aːr/ is consistently written with ⟨aː⟩.

/r/ after short vowels is not vocalized but fricativized to [ʁ] or [χ], depending on the voicing of the following sound (the lenis stops count as voiced despite their being unaspirated with variable voicing). The fricativization and devoicing to [χ] also occurs whenever the non-prevocalic /r/ is retained between /aː/ and a fortis consonant, as in schwaarz [ˈʃwaːχts] 'black', alternatively pronounced [ˈʃwaːts]. Thus, before /r/, /aː/ behaves more like a short vowel than a long one. When the following consonant is lenis or the /r/ occurs before a pause, it is unclear whether the more common consonantal realization of /r/ is a fricative or a trill.

== Phonological history ==
=== Long vowels and diphthongs ===
Middle High German (MHG) /iː/—/yː/ and /uː/ were broken into /æːɪ̯/—/ɑɪ̯/ and /æːʊ̯/—/ɑʊ̯/, but each reflexes split into two. The pairs /æːɪ̯/—/æːʊ̯/ (originally [ɛːi]—[ɑːu] as in this source) occur in originally monosyllabic words, or polysyllabic words followed by unvoiced consonants. Meanwhile, pairs /ɑɪ̯/—/ɑʊ̯/ occur in newly monosyllabic words due to loss of a suffix, polysyllabic words followed by voiced consonants, or in hiatus.

MHG /aː/ evolved into /oː/, except before /r/ and /χt/, when this phoneme respectively became /əʊ̯/ and /u̯ə/ instead. Meanwhile, its umlauted counterpart /æː/ evolved into /əɪ̯/, having been merged with the outcomes of /i̯ə/ (< Proto-Germanic *ē², *eu) and /eː/ (< *ai).

== Sample ==
The sample text is a reading of the first sentence of The North Wind and the Sun. The transcription is based on a recording of a 26-year-old male speaker of Central Luxembourgish.

=== Phonetic transcription ===
[ɑn dɐ ˈtsæːɪ̯t | hun zəɕ dən ˈnoχtvɑnd ɑn ˈdzon ɡəˈʃtʀidən || vi̯ə fun hinən ˈtsweː | vu̯əl ˈməɪ̯ ʃtaːk viːɐ̯ || vəɪ̯ ə ˈvɑndəʀɐ || deːn ɑn ə ˈvaːmə ˈmɑntəl ˈɑɡəpaːk vaː || ivɐt də ˈveː kəʊ̯m]

=== Orthographic version ===
An der Zäit hunn sech den Nordwand an d'Sonn gestridden, wie vun hinnen zwee wuel méi staark wier, wéi e Wanderer, deen an ee waarme Mantel agepak war, iwwert de Wee koum.

== Bibliography ==
- Dudenredaktion; Kleiner, Stefan; Knöbl, Ralf (2015) [First published 1962], Das Aussprachewörterbuch (in German) (7th ed.), Berlin: Dudenverlag, ISBN 978-3-411-04067-4
- Gilles, Peter; Trouvain, Jürgen (2013), "Luxembourgish" (PDF), Journal of the International Phonetic Association, 43 (1): 67–74, doi:10.1017/S0025100312000278
- Keller, Rudolf Ernst (1961), German dialects: phonology and morphology, with selected texts, Manchester: Manchester University Press, ISBN 0-7190-0762-3
