= Böckler =

Böckler is a German surname. Notable people with this surname include:

- Georg Andreas Böckler (1644–1698), German architect and engineer specialising in hydraulic architecture
- Hans Böckler (1875–1951), German politician and union leader
- Leemet Böckler (born 2001), Estonian basketball player
- Otto Böckler (1867–1932), German writer and politician

== See also ==
- Böcker (disambiguation)
