= Josh Bredl =

American wrestler, actor and rapper (born 1991)

- Bredl in 2024

Personal information
- Born: January 28, 1991 (age 35) Thornton, Colorado, U.S.
- Children: 2
- Website: joshuabredl.com

Professional wrestling career
- Ring name(s): Bronson Matthews; The Yeti; Josh Bredl
- Billed height: 6 ft 7 in (201 cm)
- Billed weight: 290 lb (132 kg)
- Trained by: Billy Gunn; Booker T Lita; WWE Performance Center
- Debut: August 25, 2015

Joshua "Yeti" Bredl (born January 28, 1991) is an American former professional wrestler, actor, musician, and entrepreneur. He is best known for winning the sixth season of WWE Tough Enough in 2015, earning a $250,000 prize and a developmental contract with WWE under the ring name The Yeti and later Bronson Matthews. Since his departure from professional wrestling, Bredl has built careers in fitness entrepreneurship, recording under the name Yetskii, and acting.

== Early life and football career ==
Bredl was born in Thornton, Colorado, and has a younger sister named Brandi Bredl. He attended Horizon High School. Coming out of Horizon, he was ranked the 93rd-best tight end prospect in the nation by ESPN and the 15th-best high school prospect in Colorado by Rivals.com, and was an All-Region and All-Conference selection. He redshirted in 2009 and played as a reserve tight end in 2010 before converting to defensive end. The school listed him at 6 feet 8 inches and 275 pounds. He played defensive end and defensive tackle for the Colorado State University–Pueblo ThunderWolves football team, majoring in exercise science, and was a member of the 2014 NCAA Division II national championship team. In his final season he was an All-Rocky Mountain Athletic Conference honorable mention selection, recording 24 tackles, four sacks and two fumble recoveries; he returned one fumble 66 yards for a touchdown and blocked a field goal attempt in the national championship game. He also played basketball for the Colorado Hawks. In April 2015 he worked out for the Denver Broncos, and he subsequently signed with the Green Bay Packers as an undrafted free agent. Bredl grew up a professional wrestling fan, citing Stone Cold Steve Austin as his favorite wrestler.

== Professional wrestling career (2015–2017) ==
=== WWE Tough Enough ===
In June 2015, Bredl was announced as one of thirteen finalists for the sixth season of the WWE competition Tough Enough. After surviving elimination three times, he was chosen by fan vote as one of the two winners on August 25, 2015, alongside Sara Lee, earning a $250,000 prize and a one-year WWE developmental contract, which WWE immediately upgraded to a four-year deal. Lee was released from WWE in 2016 and died on October 5, 2022, at the age of 30. During the finale, Bredl adopted the ring name The Yeti and wrestled a singles match against Cesaro.

=== NXT (2015–2016) ===
In September 2015, Bredl was assigned to WWE's developmental territory NXT, training at the WWE Performance Center in Orlando, Florida. At an NXT live event on December 3, 2015, he debuted under the ring name Bronson Matthews.

In January 2016, Bredl posted a tweet referring to the mid-card stable The Social Outcasts as "Social Jobbers," generating backstage criticism from WWE wrestlers including Cody Rhodes and Kevin Owens, and resulting in a temporary ban from NXT locker rooms. Bredl wrestled his final match on July 7, 2016, and remained under WWE contract for more than a year afterward. He was released by WWE on November 5, 2017.

== Post-wrestling career ==
=== Fitness and personal training ===
Following his wrestling career, Bredl built a career in the fitness industry as a personal trainer. He became a founding trainer at The Dogpound, a celebrity gym with locations in New York City and West Hollywood, Los Angeles, where his clients included Kelly Rowland, Ricky Martin, Vanessa Hudgens, and Adam Levine. He subsequently founded No Cap Fitness in 2021, later rebranded as Yeti Ultra, an online fitness coaching platform based in Denver, Colorado, which launched on Father's Day, June 21, 2026. In early 2024, Bredl publicly disclosed that he had been hospitalized for 15 days after being diagnosed with sepsis, requiring emergency exploratory surgery. He subsequently adopted a vegan diet.

In late 2025, Bredl served as the personal trainer for musician Justin Bieber during the production of Bieber's live-streamed compound on the Universal Studios backlot in Los Angeles. Bredl designed the gym layout, sourced the equipment list, and oversaw installation of the training facility inside the compound. Bieber trained in the gym during Twitch streams viewed around the world. The production ran from October 2025 through spring 2026 and won two awards at the 30th Annual Webby Awards: Best Livestream and Creator Launch or Drop.

=== Mixed martial arts ===
On April 30, 2022, Bredl made his mixed martial arts debut at Sparta Combat League's Army vs. Marines 13 event. He lost to Alvin Abitz via guillotine choke in the first round.

=== Music ===
Bredl performing as Yetskii at HazFest 2 in Los Angeles, May 2026

Bredl records and performs as Yetskii. Before his debut EP, he released three singles: "universal" on September 29, 2025, "pain will guide you" (featuring OJXO) on October 3, 2025, and "shawty like my music" on February 18, 2026. His debut EP, Laggin Off a Jet, was released on March 8, 2026, comprising six tracks: "two tinted into", "bae pull up", "bad guy", "BIG BALOOGA", "considerate" (featuring LiL Crimes), and "WUNDERBAR". The music videos for "BIG BALOOGA" and "bad guy" were released on YouTube. He performed at HazFest 2, a free multi-genre music festival co-presented by Metal Edge magazine and held in Los Angeles on May 16, 2026. He followed the EP with the single "AINT MAD AT YA" (featuring OJXO), released on June 14, 2026.

=== Acting ===
Bredl has appeared in WWE television programming and has pursued film and television roles. He was cast as Mr. Large in the horror film You Lose You Die, directed by Carlos Suarez and co-starring Freddy Rodriguez, Charlotte Flair, and Anuel AA.

=== Entrepreneurship and digital media ===
Bredl is a co-founder of Portal Health AI, a guided peptide optimization platform offering personalized health protocols developed by human coaches and nurses, with an AI agent available to clients around the clock. In December 2025, Bredl executive-produced a custom Game Boy Color for Justin Bieber, featuring an original 8-bit game titled Skylark Island, built in collaboration with developer Alex Constante. The project was covered by Complex Style.

== Filmography ==
=== Film ===
Year	Title	Role	Notes
TBA	You Lose You Die	Mr. Large	Horror film; directed by Carlos Suarez; co-starring Freddy Rodriguez, Charlotte Flair, and Anuel AA; filmed in the Dominican Republic (2023–2024)

=== Television ===
Year	Title	Role	Notes
2015	WWE Monday Night Raw	Himself	1 episode
2015	NXT TakeOver: Brooklyn	Himself	TV special
2015	WWE: SummerSlam	Himself	TV special
2015	WWE Breaking Ground	Himself	WWE Network documentary series following NXT performers

== Championships and accomplishments ==
WWE

- WWE Tough Enough Season 6 – with Sara Lee
