= Luke Robinson (wrestler) =

American professional wrestler (born 1985)

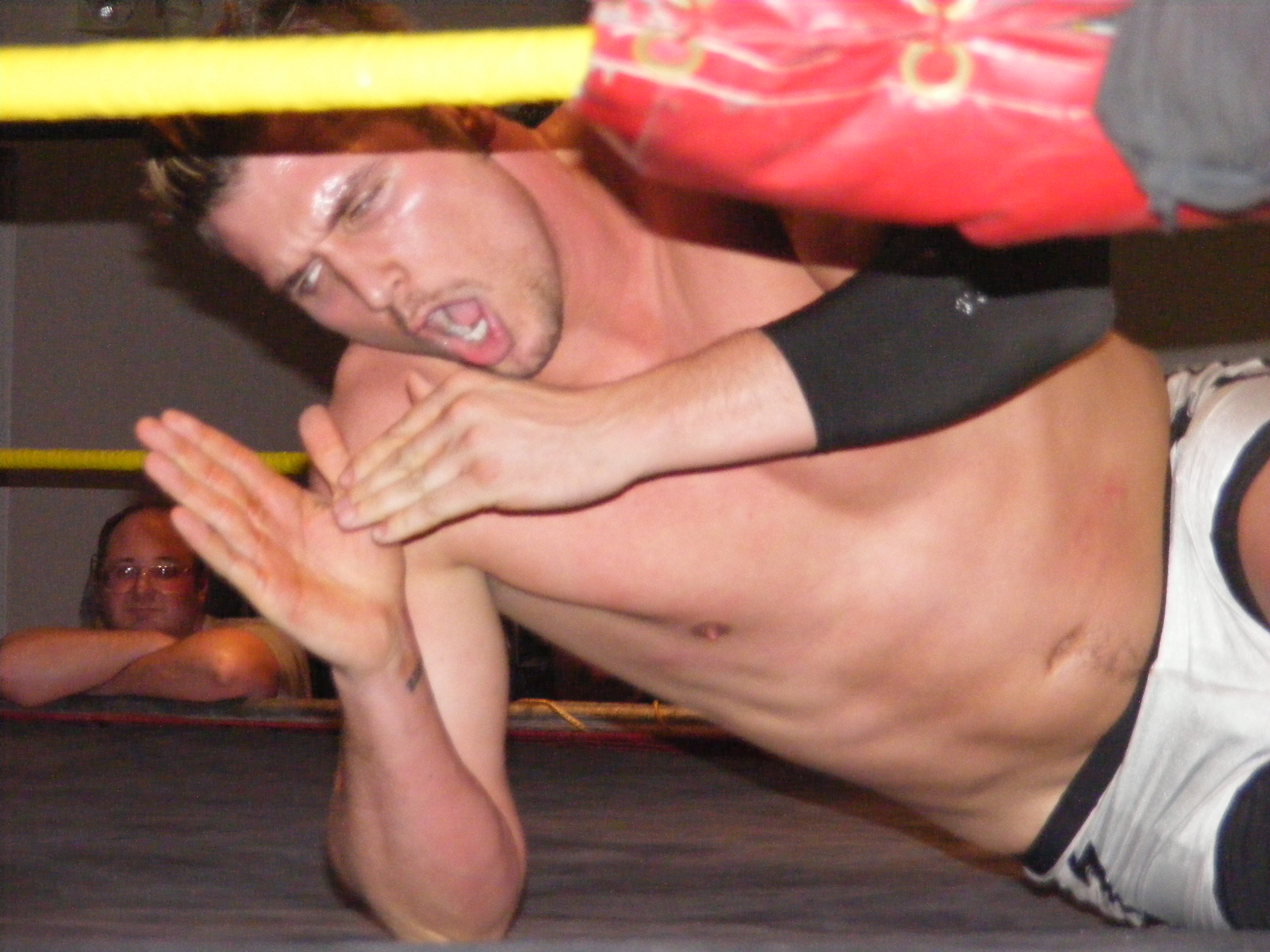
- Robinson in 2008

Personal information
- Born: Luke Barry Robinson; January 13, 1985 (age 41) Auburn, Maine, U.S.

Professional wrestling career
- Ring name(s): Bobby Robinson; Donnie Drake; Luke Robinson; The Trepidation
- Billed height: 6 ft 1 in (1.85 m)
- Billed weight: 210 lb (95 kg; 15 st)
- Trained by: Tony Atlas; Bill DeMott
- Debut: 2006

Luke Barry Robinson (born January 13, 1985) is an American professional wrestler.

== Professional wrestling career ==
=== Early career ===
At the age of fifteen, Robinson and his friends would put on shows in Robinson's basement with strobe lights, and even had a work belt that they used as a championship belt. Robinson claims the wrestling shows were his and his friend's "dirty little secret".

Robinson began his professional training while working out at a gym where WWE Hall of Famer Tony Atlas was personal training. Atlas at first ignored Robinson's request to be trained until the owner of the gym, which was Robinson's cousin, convinced Atlas to train Robinson. When Atlas realized Robinson's strong passion for the sport he began training him extensively. Over the next few years the duo would train five days a week during the summers.

In 2006, Robinson and fellow University of Southern Maine student, Casey Duncan, would drive 140 miles from the USM campus to wrestle for the indy promotion National Wrestling Alliance. Robinson wrestled under the name "The Golden Boy" Bobby Robinson for the NWA.

While on the NAWA roster, Robinson wrestled under the nickname "The Finely Tuned Athletic Machine" Luke Robinson. On April 20, 2006, Robinson his first championship by winning the North Atlantic Heavyweight Championship by defeating Sonny Roselli. Defeating Roselli not only won Robinson the NWH Heavyweight Championship but also won him the Maine State Championship. Robinson was the last to hold the Maine State Championship. Robinson held the heavyweight title until September 28, 2006, when he lost to Aleksander Chekov of the Red Devil Fight Team. On February 20, 2008, Robinson defeated Cameron Mathews to win the North Atlantic Television Championship. Robinson lost the Television title to Makua on April 23, 2008.

In 2010, Robinson appeared in videos for gay erotic wrestling website BG East. He appeared under the name "Donnie Drake". Robinson's work for the company was not sexually explicit.

=== WWE ===
==== Tough Enough ====
In March 2011, Robinson was announced as one of the fourteen contestants for the revival of WWE Tough Enough. Despite being described as "arrogant," Robinson was an early stand out, only being in the bottom three once. Robinson eventually made it to the final two with Andy Leavine, losing on the June 6 episode of Raw, where he was booed heavily by the crowd in attendance.

=== Independent circuit (2012) ===
On May 1, 2012, Nikki and Brie, known as The Bella Twins, appeared at their first independent wrestling show in Newburgh, New York at Northeast Wrestling. Appearing as special guests, Nikki and Brie argued over who was the better man, Luke or Jerry Lawler, resulting a match between the two. During the match, Luke kissed Brie only to get slapped from both twins, leaving Lawler to roll up for the win. After the match, both Brie and Nikki left the arena with Jerry Lawler. On December 6, 2012, Luke Robinson competed for the first time in his home state of Maine since leaving WWE Tough Enough competing for Pro Wrestling Experience against longtime rival Matt Taven.

== Personal life ==
Robinson grew up in Auburn, Maine, attending Edward Little High School where he was an all-star athlete at soccer, baseball, and hockey. Upon graduating high school in 2003, Robinson enrolled in the University of Southern Maine, graduating in May 2008. Before WWE, Robinson worked as a personal trainer.

== Championships and accomplishments ==
- North Atlantic Wrestling Championship
  - North Atlantic Heavyweight Championship (1 time)
  - Maine State Championship (1 time)
  - North Atlantic Television Championship (1 time)
- Pro Wrestling Illustrated
  - PWI ranked him #449 of the top 500 singles wrestlers in the PWI 500 in 2012
