= Andy Leavine =

American professional wrestler (born 1987)

Personal information
- Born: Andrew Leavine; December 27, 1987 (age 38) Brooksville, Florida, U.S.

Professional wrestling career
- Ring name(s): Andrew Leavine; Andy Leavine; Kevin Hackman
- Billed height: 6 ft 5 in (196 cm)
- Billed weight: 290 lb (132 kg)
- Billed from: Tampa, Florida
- Trained by: Florida Championship Wrestling; Booker T Bill DeMott
- Debut: 2010
- Retired: 2014

Andrew Leavine (born December 27, 1987) is an American retired professional wrestler. In 2011, Leavine won the Tough Enough contest to earn a contract with World Wrestling Entertainment (WWE); he went on to wrestle for WWE's developmental territory, Florida Championship Wrestling, under the ring name Kevin Hackman. He is also known for his appearances with World Wrestling Council (WWC), where he held the WWC Universal Heavyweight Championship.

== Early life ==
Leavine initially attended Central High School, but transferred to Springstead High School in November 2005 for the remainder of his senior year. Leavine was a two-sport athlete in high school, participating in scholastic wrestling and playing American football. During high school, he also competed in track athletics and weightlifting. At Central High, he played in all five offensive lineman positions. Prior to transferring to Sprigstead, Leavine was the captain of the Central High School football team. At Springstead, Leavine was part of the wrestling team that won the Hernando County Athletic Conference trophy in December 2005, and that same season had a record of 33 wins and 4 losses, with 23 pins.

Leavine then attended Florida International University (FIU) on a scholarship, where he continued to play football as an offensive lineman. He started all 12 FIU football games in his freshman year. During his sophomore year in 2007, Leavine broke a bone in his hand in a match against Pennsylvania State University, but only missed one game the week following his injury, the only game he missed all season. He returned in the following game against the University of Miami despite the injury. During his junior year, Leavine suffered an early season injury, but returned to the team as the left guard. He graduated from FIU in 2010, with a degree in Parks and Recreation.

In April of that year, he was invited to rookie minicamp on a tryout basis with the Miami Dolphins of the National Football League. Leavine has stated that he was misled by the Dolphins, and left the team soon after signing. Following this, he considered joining the Tampa Bay Buccaneers and playing in either the Arena Football League or the Canadian Football League, but decided against it for financial reasons.

== Professional wrestling career ==
In 2010, Leavine signed a developmental contract with World Wrestling Entertainment (WWE) and was assigned to the Florida Championship Wrestling (FCW), belonging to WWE's developmental territory. Under the ring name of Kevin Hackman, Leavine only took part in a couple of matches before being released in February 2011 to participate in Tough Enough.

In March 2011, Leavine was announced as one of the fourteen contestants for the revival of WWE Tough Enough. Leavine was not regarded as one of the front runners at the beginning of the show but ended strongly and made it to the final two with Luke Robinson. He was announced as the winner of Tough Enough on the June 6 episode of Raw by Stone Cold Steve Austin who gave him a Stone Cold Stunner after being slapped by Vince McMahon, as a welcoming gift from the WWE. Leavine also appeared on Raw the following week, on June 13, in a backstage segment with Austin and CM Punk. He then returned to FCW.

Leavine confirmed in an interview on WWE's official website in June 2011 that he would be training in FCW. In April 2012, Leavine was released from WWE.

After his release, Leavine started working for World Wrestling Council (WWC), a wrestling territory in Puerto Rico owned by Carlos Colon. On September 8, 2012, Leavine defeated Apolo and Gilbert in a three-way match to win the WWC Universal Heavyweight Championship. On October 26, 2012, he competed against Wes Brisco and Ray Fénix in a winning effort in a non-title match. He wrestled a Loser Leaves WWC Match against Wes Brisco to a no-contest after Ray González interfered and attacked both of them at the same time. The following week, he lost to Brisco in an Anything Goes Loser Leaves WWC Match, which caused him to be kayfabe fired.

On April 27, 2013, Leavine and Samson Walker defeated Thunder & Lighting, winning the WWC Tag Team Championship. On June 29, 2013, at Summer Madness, Samson and Leavine lost the Tag Team titles to The Sons of Samoa (L.A. Smooth and Afa Jr.). At WWC 40 Aniversario, Leavine defeated Walker. Leavine retired from professional wrestling in 2014.

== Personal life ==
Leavine is a cousin of Dan Spivey. Leavine has practiced both jiu-jitsu and mixed martial arts since his time attending FIU. He was married and has two children.

== Championships and accomplishments ==
- World Wrestling Council
  - WWC Universal Heavyweight Championship (1 time)
  - WWC World Tag Team Championship (1 time) – with Samson Walker
- WWE
  - Tough Enough V
