= WWE Tough Enough =

Professional wrestling television series

- Logo from the sixth season
- Also known as: Tough Enough II (season 2); Tough Enough III (season 3); $1,000,000 Tough Enough (season 4); WWE Tough Enough (seasons 5–6)
- Created by: Vince McMahon
- Presented by: "Stone Cold" Steve Austin (season 5); Chris Jericho (season 6)
- Opening theme: "Getting Away with Murder" by Papa Roach (season 4); "Champion" by Chip feat. Chris Brown (season 5); "Blaze of Glory" by Kevin Rudolf (season 6)
- Country of origin: United States
- No. of seasons: 6
- No. of episodes: 68

Production
- Executive producers: Kevin Dunn; Ken Mok; Beth Holmes; Vince McMahon; Scott Teti; Eric Van Wagenen; Alex Demyanenko; Matt Odgers
- Production location: California
- Camera setup: Multicamera setup
- Running time: 60 minutes (including commercials)
- Production companies: WWE; MTV Productions (2001–2003); Shed Media US (2011); Left Hook Media (2015); True Entertainment (2015)

Original release
- Network: MTV (2001–2003); UPN (2004); USA Network (2011, 2015)
- Release: June 21, 2001 – August 25, 2015

Related
- WWE Diva Search; WWE LFG

WWE Tough Enough, or simply Tough Enough, is an American professional wrestling reality competition series that was produced by WWE, wherein participants undergo professional wrestling training and compete for a contract with WWE. There were two winners per season for the first three seasons, all of which aired on MTV. A fourth competition was held in 2004, with only a single winner, who was integrated into (at the time) UPN's SmackDown!. As revealed in October 2010, the USA Network, revived Tough Enough to air it immediately prior to Raw, starting on April 4, 2011, a day after WrestleMania XXVII. The first three seasons were co-produced with MTV, while the revival is a co-production with Shed Media. The 2015 revival is a co-production with Left Hook Media and True Entertainment. Reruns of the 2011 season were broadcast on Universal HD, Oxygen and G4.

== Development and original series ==
The idea of the show originally came from a deal the then-WWF made with MTV in spring of 2000. One part of a deal was to create a reality series where contestants compete to win a WWE contract, the winner being one male and one female.

=== Tough Enough ===
Maven Huffman and Nidia Guenard won the first season of Tough Enough. Only two contestants were actually cut from the competition; the others eliminated voluntarily exited. Of the final five contestants, four would eventually join the WWE. Nidia was released from WWE on November 3, 2004, while Maven was released on July 5, 2005.

The first season of Tough Enough was released on DVD in 2002, along with its soundtrack.

This season became available for viewing on the WWE Network on January 12, 2015.

==== Trainers ====
- Al Snow
- Jacqueline
- Tazz
- Tori

==== Contestants ====
- Bobbie Jo Anderson
- Darryl Cross
- Jason Dayberry
- Nidia Guenard (winner)
- Maven Huffman (winner)
- Josh Lomberger (runner-up; eventually signed to WWE as a broadcaster under the name Josh Mathews)
- Taylor Matheny (runner-up)
- Shadrick McGee
- Chris Nifong
- Christopher Nowinski (runner-up)
- Victoria Tabor
- Paulina Thomas
- Greg Whitmoyer

Order of elimination:

- Episode 1 Tom, after being selected to the final 13, refused to sign the MTV contract and was replaced by Greg.
- Episode 3 Jason quit because he could not handle the road life.
- Episode 4 Bobbie Jo and Victoria quit together because they could not handle the physicality.
- Episode 5 Darryl was cut for not being able to keep up with the rest and overall poor attitude.
- Episode 6 Shadrick was cut due to ring struggles.
- Episode 7 Paulina dropped out due to severe leg and knee injuries sustained in the second episode.
- Episode 9 Greg was forced to quit due to three herniated discs.
- Episode 10 Chris Nifong quit after feeling it was not his time.
- Episode 13 Taylor, Chris Nowinski, and Josh were runners up after Nidia and Maven were declared winners.

==== Episodes ====
No.	Title	Original release date
1	"Casting Special"	June 21, 2001
With more than 4,000 tapes sent into the company, 230 hopefuls came to The World to audition for the show, but only 13 were selected to make the trip to Stamford, Connecticut, to find out who is tough enough.
2	"Welcome to the Jungle"	June 28, 2001
The group meets Al Snow, Jacqueline, and Tori and begin their training. They also meet Tazz, who comes to their house unannounced one morning and forces them to wrestle in the mud and jog behind him while he rides in a Hummer.
3	"Jason Crumbles"	July 5, 2001
Triple H lectures the group about the reality and the integrity of the wrestling business—a reality that Jason decides he is not willing to be a part of and respects too much to waste.
4	"If You Can't Stand the Heat"	July 12, 2001
Bobbie Jo and Victoria decide that they do not belong in the wrestling business. When Maven and Josh kid around the house, a fire breaks out. Stephanie McMahon takes the girls out to lunch. When Al has to wrestle on SmackDown!, the group scores front row tickets to the show.
5	"Dispatching Darryl"	July 19, 2001
Darryl can't catch a break when he loses a bet in a game of darts to "Big", Josh, Greg, and Maven, and aggravates Chris Nowinski when he asks him for more money to cook dinner for Pat Patterson. Meanwhile, the trainers are not keen on his performance, either in the ring or out of it.
6	"Tears Idle Tears"	July 26, 2001
After a hard day in the ring, the group realizes that either Shadrick or Chris Nifong are going to be cut. Meanwhile, the kids visit a restaurant staffed entirely by Drag Artists, who quickly bring Maven, Greg, and Chris Nowinski on-stage.
7	"A No-Win-Ski Situation"	August 2, 2001
After Kurt Angle visits the group and tells of how he broke into the wrestling business, the kids take a trip to the Bahamas where Chris Nowinski begins to annoy Josh, and Paulina suffers a knee injury which forces her to make a tough decision.
8	"Dropping Like Flies"	August 9, 2001
The Hardy Boyz and Lita visit the group. Meanwhile, Nidia and Josh injure themselves in the ring, while Greg aggravates an old back injury that puts his future in the competition in jeopardy.
9	"The Vicious Circle"	August 16, 2001
With the troupe feeling bruised and banged up, Al takes their mind off it by introducing them to "the circle game" and bets Chris Nowinski that he can beat him three times with it. After he loses, he must go to Yale University proclaiming that "Harvard Sucks." Meanwhile, Greg's doctor advises him that continuing to wrestle may be detrimental to his health.
10	"Timing is Everything"	August 23, 2001
When Maven learns that his mother's cancer has gotten worse, he leaves the house for a few days to care for her in the hospital. With Maven away, Josh begins to get lonely and contemplates leaving the competition. Meanwhile, Chris Nifong, having earned the nickname "Career Killer", decides that it might not be his time to be a professional wrestler after Mick Foley talks to the group.
11	"The Rules of the Road"	August 30, 2001
Al takes the kids on a three-day trip to Backlash, Raw is War, and SmackDown! in order for them to experience what life as a WWF superstar on the road is like where they get a crash course in cutting promos from The Brooklyn Brawler.
12	"No Hill Too Tall, Nor Water Too Deep"	September 20, 2001
As the competition nears its end, "Stone Cold" Steve Austin and Debra visit the kids at home, "Big" holds one more physical challenge for the group at a rock quarry, and Josh must overcome his self-doubt in order to successfully execute a moonsault.
13	"That's Not the Story"	September 27, 2001
The kids wrestle against each other as Vince McMahon watches from ringside. The chairman has more in store for the troupe as they are called into his office at WWF headquarters.
14	"The Beginning"	September 27, 2001
After nine weeks together, through thick and thin, the kids have one final match against their trainers before returning to WWF New York to find out who has earned a WWF contract.

==== Aftermath ====
Maven Huffman would go on to become a three time WWF Hardcore Champion. He was released by WWE in July 2005 and would later work for Impact Wrestling. He also appeared on the sixth season of The Surreal Life. Nidia Guenard would go on to manage Jamie Noble and compete in the women's division. She was released by WWE in November 2004 and retired shortly afterwards. Christopher Nowinski would eventually make the main roster, where he was a two time WWE Hardcore Champion. He would retire from wrestling in 2003, becoming an advocate for concussion awareness. Josh Lomberger would be hired as a commentator and backstage interviewer under the name "Josh Mathews". He was released in 2014 and go on to work for Impact Wrestling as a commentator and senior producer, where he is also a one time Impact Grand Champion. Greg Whitmoyer would become a wrestler as Greg Matthews working for Combat Zone Wrestling and independent circuit until retiring in 2010.

=== Tough Enough 2 ===
The second season winners were Linda Miles and Jackie Gayda. The result offended members of the male finalists, who claimed that when they signed forms to compete on Tough Enough, the forms spoke of one male winner and one female winner. Eventually, Linda and Jackie were released on November 12, 2004 and July 5, 2005, respectively. Gayda later married wrestler Charlie Haas, but would later divorce in 2020.

Shad Gaspard, who would later become a member of the WWE tag team Cryme Tyme, was chosen to be one of the final 13 contestants on the show but, according to the show, failed a physical; he was subsequently replaced by Danny. Eventual season 3 winner John Hennigan (who went on to compete for the WWE as John Morrison) auditioned and survived the first cut down to 25 contestants, but, despite displaying well-tuned athletic ability, Hennigan's arrogance irritated the judges. It would be another year before Hennigan would make the show. There were several other well known faces in the crowd who didn't make the cut, but, eventually made a name for themselves in the business, including Shelly Martinez (known as Ariel in the WWE and as Salinas in TNA), Kia Stevens (known as Awesome Kong in TNA and as Kharma in WWE), former fitness model Kim Nielsen (who was known by her real name in WWE and as Desire in TNA, and who competed on season 13 of The Biggest Loser), Jaxson Ryker and Ken Anderson (known as Mr. Kennedy in WWE) (both of whom later returned to WWE).

==== Trainers ====
- Al Snow
- Hardcore Holly
- Ivory
- Tazz
- Chavo Guerrero Jr.

==== Contestants ====
- Danny Carney
- Jackie Gayda (winner; eventually known as Miss Jackie, the manager/valet for the tag team of Charlie Haas and Rico)
- Anni King
- Aaron Lewis
- Kenny Layne (runner-up)
- Alicia Martin
- Linda Miles (winner; eventually known as Shaniqua, the manager/valet of The Basham Brothers)
- Matt Morgan
- Robert Savhalet
- Jake Sokoloff (runner-up)
- Pete Tornatore
- Jessie Ward
- Hawk Younkins

Order of Elimination:

- Episode 3: Aaron was cut because he could not physically catch up with the rest of the group's speed. That caused him to pass out on the beach while exercising.
- Episode 3: Robert was cut because he was struggling with all the physicality in and out of the ring; thus, he tired out more easily than others.
- Episode 5: Danny was cut because he lacked charisma while trying to perform an interview for the trainers.
- Episode 6: Matt left because he tore a ligament in his right knee, and his doctor told him it would not be safe to continue wrestling in the ring.
- Episode 7: Alicia was cut because she had an injury which it hindered her from continuing to wrestle in the ring.
- Episode 7: Jessie left because she was diagnosed with a heart condition. Jessie later credited the show for essentially saving her life, as the heart condition would have gone unnoticed had she not gone for testing
- Episode 11: Hawk left because he became concerned about his performance in the ring.
- Episode 12: Pete was cut because he couldn't keep up in the ring as well as the others.
- Episode 12: Anni was cut because of her hesitation in the ring.
- Episode 13: Linda and Jackie were declared the winners of Tough Enough 2, with Jake and Kenny being joint runners-up.

==== Aftermath ====
Both winners Jackie Gayda and Linda Miles would go on to work on the main roster as managers. Gayda would manage future husband Charlie Haas and Rico under her real name, while Miles would manage the Basham Brothers as their dominatrix Shaniqua. Jessie Ward would work as a stage manager for WWE between 2002 and 2004. In September 2013, she married future NXT Superstar Tommaso Ciampa. Kenny Layne would later find success wrestling for Impact Wrestling and Ring of Honor under the ring name "Kenny King". Matt Morgan would work on the main roster in October 2003 until January 2004. He would return to OVW. In April 2005, Morgan returned to the main roster teaming with Carlito. He was released by WWE in July 2005. Later appear in the 2008 revival of American Gladiators as the gladiator "Beast". Morgan found success in Impact Wrestling, where he is a two time TNA World Tag Team Champion. Hawk Younkins would compete in one MMA match on September 18, 2004.

=== Tough Enough III ===
The third season was won by John Hennigan and Matt Cappotelli.

Melina Perez tried out for Tough Enough III and made it to the final 25, but was cut from the competition. During the tryouts she met John Hennigan, and they began a romantic relationship. Perez eventually received a WWE contract and worked as Melina on the Smackdown (WWE brand) and Raw (WWE brand) shows. She went on to become the first Tough Enough contestant to win the WWE Women's Championship and the WWE Divas Championship, which she held respectively three and two times, making her the most successful female Tough Enough contestant to enter WWE. Perez was eventually released from WWE on August 5, 2011. Both Shawn Daivari and Daniel Puder are seen on film during audition episode. Both made it to the final 75, but were cut before they could make it to the training facility. Daivari was later hired by WWE to team with Muhammad Hassan, while Puder was able to join and eventually win the fourth season of Tough Enough.

Hardcore Holly made a controversial guest appearance on one episode of the show, where he stiffed Cappotelli during a training match, leaving him with a black eye, a fat lip and crying and requesting to leave the program; the incident was discussed on February 8, 2003 episode of WWE Confidential.

==== Trainers ====
- Al Snow
- Bill DeMott
- Ivory

==== Contestants ====
- Jonah Adelman (runner-up)
- Jamie Burk (runner-up)
- Matt Cappotelli (winner)
- Chad
- Scott Chong
- John Hennigan (winner, eventually wrestled as Johnny Nitro and John Morrison)
- Jill
- Justin
- Kelly
- Lisa
- Eric Markovcy (runner-up)
- Nick
- Rebekah

Order of Elimination:

- Episode 2: Jill quit after the very first day of training. The trainers were all annoyed and labeled her as a "quitter" because she never put forth her best effort.
- Episode 3: Lisa left because she decided wrestling wasn't the right career for her (see below).
- Episode 4: Chad was cut because of his lack of ability to keep up the pace with the rest of the group.
- Episode 5: Rebekah left because she had a family emergency back at home and could not continue in the competition.
- Episode 6: Nick was cut because he had a bicep injury, and he lacked the ability to perform certain tasks in the ring.
- Episode 7: Scott was cut because of his lack of ability to keep up with the rest of the group.
- Episode 8: Kelly was cut because she had a serious back injury, and she was beginning to fall behind everybody else when learning new moves.
- Episode 11: Justin was cut because he lacked aggression in the ring as well as a competitive spirit.
- Episode 14: Matt and John were declared the winners of Tough Enough III, with Jamie, Eric and Jonah being the runners up.

==== Aftermath ====
Hennigan, who wrestled for WWE under the names Johnny Nitro and John Morrison, would go on win various championships, including the ECW World Championship, three Intercontinental Championships, and the WWE, SmackDown, and World Tag Team Championships once each. Hennigan left WWE in November 2011 and also found success outside of WWE in other promotions such as Impact Wrestling, Lucha Underground and Lucha Libre AAA Worldwide between 2012 and 2019.

Cappotelli was developing his talent further in WWE development territory Ohio Valley Wrestling (OVW), but was diagnosed with a brain tumor in December 2005, forcing him to step away from wrestling and relinquish his OVW Heavyweight Championship. The tumor was removed in 2007, and it was unknown whether Cappotelli would ever return to professional wrestling. In July 2017, Cappotelli announced that he was diagnosed with grade IV glioblastoma multiforme. He died on June 29, 2018, at the age of 38.

==== Lisa incident ====
In the cover story from the October 5, 2002 issue of the Pro Wrestling Torch Newsletter, it was revealed that contestant "Lisa" was removed from the show after what was referred to as a "psychotic breakdown." After being left at the house while the other contestants went out to dinner, she began throwing herself against the walls of the house, eventually breaking into the hidden MTV control room and working her way onto the roof. After being talked down by producers, she was committed to a hospital facility to receive psychiatric treatment. Her parents flew in from New Mexico to pick her up, but she physically attacked them, claiming she did not know them. She then escaped custody inside LAX, shutting down a wing of the airport until she was located. Again, she was hospitalized, but she was able to check herself out shortly after. She then contacted Tough Enough producers, claiming she was ready to return to the show. Producers informed her she had been removed from the competition due to her actions. The other contestants (and, subsequently, the audience) were initially told that Lisa simply decided wrestling "wasn't the right career for her." Lisa then reemerged in Louisville, Kentucky, at the Ohio Valley Wrestling training center, claiming that trainer Al Snow and producer John "Big" Gaburick had sent her for additional training, both in the ring and to learn further about the structure of the developmental territory system. At a series of shows in California in September 2002, she managed to talk her way backstage and was even allowed to assist with the pyrotechnics for the wrestlers' entrances at a TV taping. One source claimed that she had a face-to-face conversation with Vince McMahon, who was apparently unaware of her status with the Tough Enough program. Soon after, her photograph was circulated to security personnel, and she was barred from any backstage areas.

=== $1,000,000 Tough Enough (season 4) ===
The fourth Tough Enough competition was conducted as part of WWE's SmackDown! brand between October and December 2004 in response to Raw holding the first annual Raw Diva Search contest. The prize was a $1 million professional wrestling contract split evenly over four years with only the first year guaranteed. The winner of the fourth series, announced on December 14, 2004, and televised on December 16, 2004, was Daniel Puder, an American professional mixed martial artist. Puder competed in his second WWE pay-per-view event on January 30, 2005 as the third entrant in the 2005 Royal Rumble match. Soon after, he was sent to OVW before eventually being released in September 2005.

==== Contestants ====
- John Meyer Jr.
- Nick Mitchell (eventually signed by WWE as Mitch)
- Mike Mizanin (runner-up, eventually signed by WWE in 2006, known as The Miz)
- Chris Nawrocki
- Daniel Puder (winner)
- Ryan Reeves (eventually signed by WWE as Skip Sheffield, later known as Ryback)
- Daniel Rodimer
- Justice Smith

==== Daniel Puder shoot incident ====
On November 4, 2004, episode of SmackDown!, taped in St. Louis, Missouri, during an unscripted segment of Tough Enough, Kurt Angle, a former American amateur wrestler and 1996 Olympic gold medalist, challenged the finalists through a squat thrust competition. Chris Nawrocki won the competition, and the prize Nawrocki won was a match against Angle. Angle quickly took Nawrocki down, breaking his ribs, then made him tap out with a neck crank. After Angle defeated Nawrocki, Angle challenged the other finalists. Puder accepted Angle's challenge. Angle and Puder wrestled for position, with Angle taking Puder down; however, in the process, Puder locked Angle in a kimura lock. With Puder on his back and Angle's arm locked in the kimura, Angle attempted a pin, one of two referees in the ring, Jim Korderas, quickly counted three to end the bout, despite the fact that Puder's shoulders weren't fully down on the mat, bridging up at two. Puder later claimed that if Korderas had not ended the match, he would have either snapped Angle's arm or made Angle tap out on national television. Dave Meltzer and Dave Scherer gave these following comments:

"It was real. If you don't follow fighting, Puder had Angle locked in the Kimura, or keylock as Tazz called it, although Tazz didn't let on the move was fully executed. Not only was Angle not getting out of the move, but most MMA fighters would have tapped already. Angle couldn't tap for obvious reasons. The ref counted a three even though Puder's shoulders weren't fully down, trying to end the thing, because the reality was Angle would have been in surgery had it gone a few seconds longer or had Puder not given up the hold." ― Dave Meltzer

"As you would expect, Kurt Angle was less than happy backstage at Smackdown after almost being forced to tap out to Tough Enough contestant Daniel Puder. Downright ticked off would probably be the best way to describe his mood. The unscripted nature of the contest was the main reason that Angle was made to look so bad since Puder just reacted to the situation and could have forced Angle to submit had the referees not thought quickly and counted a pin that wasn't there on Puder." ― Dave Scherer

==== Aftermath ====
Mike Mizanin signed a developmental contract with WWE and made his main roster debut in 2006 as The Miz and became the first and the only Tough Enough contestant to win the WWE Championship and to headline WrestleMania. Additionally, he has held multiple midcard and tag team championships in WWE, and is one of only two wrestlers in WWE history to complete the Grand Slam twice.

Ryan Reeves signed a developmental contract with WWE. He continued working for Ohio Valley Wrestling until early 2007 when he was released by WWE. He later resigned a contract with WWE in late 2008 working for Florida Championship Wrestling. He then participated in the first season of NXT in early 2010 under the ring name Skip Sheffield, and became one of the original members of the faction The Nexus. He resurfaced on the main roster in early 2012 under the ring name Ryback, and headlined five pay-per-view events, three of those for the WWE Championship. He is also a former WWE Intercontinental Champion. He would remain with WWE until August 2016.

Daniel Rodimer signed a developmental contract with WWE, and later wrestled on Heat as Dan Rodman in 2007. He retired from wrestling in late 2007.

Nick Mitchell signed a developmental contract with WWE. He made his debut on the main roster in January 2006 as Mitch, a member of the male cheerleader group The Spirit Squad. As a member of the Spirit Squad, he is a former World Tag Team Champion, which he won under the Freebird Rule. He was released by WWE in May 2007 and retired completely from wrestling.

Justice Smith would later appear in the 2008 revival of American Gladiators, using his first name as his gladiator name.

Marty Wright, who lied about his age during the auditions and was disqualified, later signed with WWE and competed as The Boogeyman.

During the tryouts, Brian Danovich suffered a torn pectoral muscle during the bench press but then went on to complete the assault course in its entirely while carrying the injury. After withdrawing from the event, then Head of Talent Relations John Laurinaitis offered him a developmental contract on the spot though he was eventually released after numerous injuries without appearing on the main roster. He would resurface in June 2018 with a wrestling internet radio show called Wrestling With Passion on Action VR Network on Mixlr, which lasted only five episodes before his untimely death on August 9, 2018, at the age of 38 by committing suicide.

Andrew Hankinson tried out for this season but failed to make it to the finals. However, he was signed to a WWE developmental contract and later competed in WWE as Festus and Luke Gallows until his WWE release in November 2010. He would go on to compete for Impact Wrestling as a member of the Aces & Eights and New Japan Pro-Wrestling teaming with Karl Anderson as members of the Bullet Club. In 2016, Gallows returned to WWE with Anderson as tag team champions. They were both released in April 2020, then rehired in October 2022, before being again released in January 2025.

A DVD of this season was released in 2005.

== Revival ==
=== Season 5 ===
On October 18, 2010, the television website Deadline Hollywood reported that USA Network was considering expanding into reality programming with a revival of Tough Enough. The website also reported that the show was expected to "run in tandem with USA's WWE Raw series." On January 3, 2011, both The New York Times and WWE further confirmed the revival, revealing that the revived series would begin airing Monday nights beginning on April 4, 2011, following WWE Raw, and a day after WrestleMania XXVII. The following week, Tough Enough aired during its planned time slot before WWE Raw. The revived series is a co-production with Shed Media.

"Stone Cold" Steve Austin served as the show's season 5 host while Booker T, Trish Stratus, and Bill DeMott served as trainers. According to USA Network's episode guide, the 2011 season is referred to as "Season 1", therefore making no reference to its prior runs on other networks. In addition, although the premise of this show is similar to that of WWE NXT, Tough Enough season 5 ran concurrently with NXT and did not replace it.

Similar to the reality series Hell's Kitchen, several episodes concluded with a voiceover of Austin's thoughts on the eliminated contestant as he goes to his office and hangs their belt on the wall.

==== Host ====
- Stone Cold Steve Austin

==== Trainers ====
- Bill DeMott
- Trish Stratus
- Booker T

==== Guests ====
- John Cena (episode 2)
- Big Show (episode 3)
- Stacy Keibler (episode 3)
- Bret Hart (episode 4)
- Rey Mysterio (episode 5)
- John Salley (episode 5)
- John Morrison (episode 6)
- The Bella Twins (episode 7)
- Kelly Kelly (episode 7)
- Eve Torres (episode 7)
- The Rock (episode 8)
- James Roday (episode 8)
- The Miz (episode 9)
- Ricky Steamboat (episode 10)

==== Contestants ====
#	Contestants	Episodes									
#	Contestants	1	2	3	4	5	6	7	8	9	10
1	Andy Leavine	SAFE	SAFE	SAFE	SAFE	SAFE	SAFE	SAFE	RISK	SAFE	WINNER
2	Luke Robinson	HIGH	HIGH	SAFE	SAFE	RISK	HIGH	SAFE	SAFE	SAFE	RUNNER UP
3	Jeremiah Riggs	SAFE	SAFE	SAFE	SAFE	SAFE	SAFE	SAFE	SAFE	OUT	
4	Christina Crawford	SAFE	SAFE	SAFE	SAFE	RISK	SAFE	SAFE	OUT		
5	A.J. Kirsch	SAFE	SAFE	SAFE	SAFE	SAFE	RISK	SAFE	OUT		
6	Martin Casaus	SAFE	SAFE	HIGH	HIGH	HIGH	SAFE	INJ			
7	Ivelisse Vélez	SAFE	SAFE	SAFE	SAFE	SAFE	INJ				
8	Eric Watts	RISK	SAFE	SAFE	SAFE	SAFE	OUT				
9	Ryan Howe	SAFE	RISK	RISK	SAFE	OUT					
10	Rima Fakih	SAFE	RISK	RISK	OUT						
11	Mickael Zaki	SAFE	SAFE	OUT							
12	Michelle Deighton	RISK	SAFE	QUIT							
13	Matt Capiccioni	SAFE	OUT								
14	Ariane Andrew	OUT									

The contestant won the Tough Enough competition
The contestant performed best in the skills challenge.
The contestant was safe from elimination.
The contestant was at risk of elimination.
The contestant was selected to go into the finale.
The contestant was eliminated.
The contestant left the competition.
The contestant was forced by injury to withdraw from the competition.
The contestant won the skills challenge but was eliminated.
The contestant was the runner up.

Episode 1: Ariane was eliminated as Steve Austin and the trainers felt she did not have passion for wrestling. She later signed to WWE and competed as Cameron.
Episode 2: Matt was eliminated for not breaking free of the pack even though he has 9 years of experience.
Episode 3: Michelle quit so she could be with her daughter. Mickael was eliminated when Ryan performed a better promo.
Episode 4: Rima was eliminated after showing no improvement during the past month.
Episode 5: Ryan was eliminated because of his performance and for being in the bottom 3 three times in a row.
Episode 6: Ivelisse was eliminated due to an injury. Eric was eliminated for not improving.
Episode 7: Martin was forced out as he fractured his ankle and was not allowed to continue.
Episode 8: A.J. was eliminated because of his performance prior to charisma week, even after winning the skills challenge. Christina was eliminated for not showing any charisma.
Episode 9: Jeremiah was eliminated when his inexperience caught up to him.
Episode 10: Andy was chosen as the winner of Tough Enough with Luke being the runner-up.

==== Episodes ====
No.	Title	Original release date
1	"Get Your Teeth Out of My Ring"	April 4, 2011
WWE legend "Stone Cold" Steve Austin has selected 14 men and women to compete to become the next WWE Superstar or Diva. Steve welcomes them to the Valley View Casino Center in San Diego, California, which hosted the 600th episode of WWE Smackdown that night, but the only part they will play in tonight's show is doing clean-up duty backstage in addition to changing the NXT ring into Smackdown following the former's taping, as well as cleaning up the arena once the show's over. Steve puts all the contestants through "Three Minutes of Hell" by running the ropes. Jeremiah runs so hard that he blows his false teeth out. Rima is caught cheating when Steve and the trainers notice she has padded her posterior for the challenge. After deliberating on the best and worst, Steve announces the Worst Three: Ariane, Eric and Michelle. Eric finally shows some fire when he talks about his personal motivation for winning. Steve questions Michelle's ability to live on the road with a baby daughter at home, but it's Ariane's lack of experience that proves to be her downfall. Steve asks for her belt and eliminates her from the competition. Prior to being eliminated, Ariane infamously claimed that her favorite WWE match of all time was Melina vs. Alicia Fox at the previous year's SummerSlam, causing Steve Austin to reply "who?!" in utter disbelief. Austin's comment: "When I talk to people that wanted to get into WWE, more often than not I can tell just by the way they talk about the business that they're truly hooked that they're truly committed that this is what they loved and this is what they want to do. I didn't get that with Ariane."
2	"Five for Flinching"	April 11, 2011
The next day at the training center, Steve Austin introduces courage as the theme for this week's challenges. Trish Stratus puts Matt, a ten-year pro, through a personality drill. Impressed, she sends him to the ring for an exhibition match with Luke. However, Matt fades into the background as Luke takes control of the match. The next day, Steve Austin puts the courage of the contestants to the test when he brings them outside to try to outrun police attack dogs. Rima is 20 minutes late to the skills challenge. In the skills challenge, the contestants are squashed in the corner and then body slammed five times by Bill DeMott. After deliberating on the best and worst, Steve announces the Bottom Three: Ryan, Rima, and Matt. In the ring, Steve Austin scolds Rima for her tardiness but praises her mental toughness. While Steve believes that Ryan may be "too nice" for the business, it is Matt who is eliminated due to his hesitance in demonstrating his skills. John Cena guest stars. Austin's comment: "Matt's been in the business for nine years. Showed me absolutely zero personality. There's a million mechanics out there, but there's only a few superstars. You got chosen to come here to Tough Enough and this is a once-in-a-lifetime opportunity. So put up or shut up."
3	"Bad Day. Real Bad Day"	April 18, 2011
Bill sends the contestants on a grueling run. Luke comes in first, and Rima beats all of the women and some of the men. Eric's poor physical condition puts him in last place. The contestants are then sent to the gym for a training session. Mickael shows poor technique and is relegated to working with the beginners. On day two, as Steve enters to announce the life lesson Michelle interrupts him to announce her decision to quit. Her daughter is more important to her than the competition – a decision Steve respects. Out on the field, the rest of the contestants take on their new Life Lesson – to learn a cheerleading drill and perform it at Universal City Walk. On day three Steve begins the next Skills Challenge: Chain of Command. Martin is declared the winner after Eric tires out. Steve and the trainers announce the bottom three – Ryan, Rima and Mickael. At elimination, Steve is impressed that Rima asked for one-on-one help and sends her back to the house. Steve pits rivals Ryan and Mickael against each other in a promo duel. Ryan impresses Steve with his passion, and Steve decides to send Mickael home. Big Show and Stacy Keibler guest star. Michelle's belt was already displayed on the wall at the end of the episode despite Austin not commenting on her withdrawal. Austin's comment: "Mickel had a chance to save himself, but Ryan manned up. He dropped some of the nice guy persona and got me because he had to. He got serious. This is business. You don't have the rest of your life to win Tough Enough. Hey tonight at elimination, Ryan manned up. It's him versus Mickel and he ate his ass up on a promo."
4	"110 Pound Elephant in the Room"	April 25, 2011
Rima receives a one-on-one midnight training session with Bill. Bill puts her through a grueling workout. The next day, Steve introduces the theme of agility. The test for the day is a series of leaps over the top rope of the ring. Luke and Jeremiah both excel. The next day, the contestants are sent to Friscoe's, a 1950s style diner, and are told that they will be working as waiters and waitresses – on roller-skates. At the Skills Challenge the following day, the cast is given a sequence of moves to perform to test their agility. The challenge comes down to Andy, Martin and Luke. Martin wins the challenge. Steve Austin returns to announce the bottom three. He calls Rima's name then tells her he's not going to call anyone else and eliminates her on the spot. Rima heads back to the house to pack up her bags. She brings Steve Austin her Tough Enough belt. Despite her drawbacks in the ring, Austin tells her that there are other ways to break into the business, and she may still have a future in it. Bret Hart guest stars. Austin's comment: "As far as the elimination of Rima, I wish her well. She's got a great heart and her mind tells her, "Yes. Keep doing this." But her keeps telling me no. And that's just the way it is."
5	"Don't Mistake My Kindness for Weakness"	May 2, 2011
The theme this week is teamwork. The contestants play basketball against a professional team of dwarf players, who win handily with superior shooting and passing skills. The contestants also undergo a grueling outdoor obstacle course, which shows the lack of endurance some have. The bottom three are Ryan, Luke and Christina; Steve Austin tells Luke he is annoyed at his appearance and apparent attitude, but Ryan is sent home because it is his "third strike." Rey Mysterio and John Salley guest star. Austin's comment: Oh, Ryan. Skidmark. He showed everyday and he tried his best, but you cannot be in my bottom three for three weeks in a row. You just can't. He's a nice a guy and I wish him well. But three strikes at Tough Enough? Goodbye."
6	"It's Getting Down To Nut Cuttin' Time"	May 9, 2011
The theme of the week is focus. The contestants are taken through a rope course that involves climbing, balance and focus during which Ivelisse falls off a rope she was expected to repel across when her injured leg gives out. She returns to the course, however, and finishes. Eric, however, does not. After collapsing mid-course due to lack of conditioning, Stone Cold has to send help up to lower Eric down in what Eric calls "probably the most embarrassing, crushing moment of my life." In the skills challenge, the contestants do squats on the top rope, then hold the squat position until only 4 are left. The remaining four (Ivelisse, Christina, Luke and Jeremiah) hold the squat position on the top rope while Eric and Andy run the ropes to try and shake them. The two girls fell, sending Luke and Jeremiah into the final part of the competition—a series of moves involving body slams and top rope elbow drops. Jeremiah got sloppy and Luke was declared the winner. A.J., Ivelisse and Eric are sent to the bottom 3. A.J. is warned that he was "boring as watching grass grow" and told to pick it up. Ivelisse is cut, despite Stone Cold telling her he was sure she belonged in the ring, because her injury was keeping her from performing up to standards. Eric was also cut, having made no improvement in his conditioning. John Morrison guest stars. Austin's comment: "You know Eric, I'm not gonna totally write him out. He has a great look. He has flashes of being really, really good in the ring. But as much potential as he has, he's just not tough enough. You know I wish Ivelisse all the luck in the world. Her body just wouldn't say I thought ahead and the name of the contest is Tough Enough, and you've gotta fight through injuries. But if she keeps working hard at it, maybe we'll see her inside a WWE ring one of these days."
7	"Running with Wolves"	May 16, 2011
The theme for the week is creativity. The contestants are instructed to put a personal touch to their moves. Steve takes the contestants to the THQ Headquarters to try out WWE All Stars. Contestants create their own characters to show their creativity. That same night, contestants are put through a two-hour training session. Martin fractures his foot during the session and ends up going to an emergency room, where he's told he cannot continue in the competition. Martin is forced to quit, and Stone Cold allows him to hang up his own belt since he is "tough enough". In the skills challenge, in a two-minute time limit, the contestants are told to perform the moves they know including a move off the top rope. Christina performs a move off the ropes which injures her ankle while working a match with A.J. She is taken to the emergency room while Steve tells everyone else they are dismissed and there will be no elimination. The Bella Twins, Kelly Kelly, and Eve Torres guest star.
8	"I've Been Bamboozled and Flabbergasted"	May 23, 2011
The theme of the week was charisma. The trainers take the contestants to Hollywood to meet Psych's star, James Roday. Bill DeMott says Jeremiah "gots the charisma". The contestants go back to the house where they go off and do training with The Rock. The Rock says he "will stay for a little bit" to see what will happen. The skills challenge winner is A.J., yet the bottom three are Christina, Andy, and A.J. Andy gets pissed off at Stone Cold and tells him that he's got the wrong people in the bottom three. Stone Cold announced that there will be a double elimination. Andy is saved, but Christina and A.J. are cut. Austin's comment: "Christina's work in the ring is solid. She hit beautiful. But here on charisma, she kinda got exposed a little bit. Think she's kind of a shy type. If someone can help her come out of her shell, she's still has a future in this business. She's just not gonna win WWE Tough Enough. It was time for A.J. to ride off into the sunset. Mechanically, he was ok. But you know at the end of the day I'm trying to build a WWE Superstar here. And as judge, jury and executioner, it was time to say "Sayonara, A.J."
9	"Now We Face the Rattlesnake"	May 30, 2011
The theme of the week is "putting it all together". The trainers throw everything the contestants have learned over the course of the competition to see who can be a WWE Superstar. After training, Stone Cold and the trainers take the contestants to a photo shoot with The Miz to give them a taste of what it is like to fulfill obligations outside the ring such as media appearances. Back at the gym, the trainers put the contestants through more tests to determine what they have learned. Later, Stone Cold takes the final three to Chase Child Life Program at the Ronald Reagan UCLA Medical Center to visit with the children and show that the WWE always likes to give back to the fans. The skills challenge consists of putting a series of moves together and executing them. The final three face Stone Cold at the final elimination. Although it's very close, Jeremiah's lack of experience costs him, and he is sent home. Austin gave no comment on Jeremiah's elimination.
10	"May The Best Man Win"	June 6, 2011
The final two, Andy and Luke, head to Florida Championship Wrestling in Tampa, Florida, the official development center of the WWE, for their final challenge: an eight-minute exhibition match with Bill DeMott in front of a live audience and WWE executives. The contestant with the best performance will win a WWE contract and the title of Tough Enough. Austin declares Andy the winner. Ricky "The Dragon" Steamboat guest stars and Vince McMahon makes a cameo. Austin gave no comment on Andy's win.

==== Aftermath ====
Ariane Andrew, Christina Crawford, and Ivelisse Vélez received developmental contracts after the show was over along with winner Andy Leavine. Despite being the first person cut from the competition, Ariane Andrew ultimately wound up being the sole contestant to be called up to the main roster. She has appeared on WWE programming as Cameron, one half of The Funkadactyls, as well as Total Divas as herself. Leavine was released in 2012 after a lackluster run in developmental. He would later find success while wrestling in World Wrestling Council, where he is a one time WWC Universal Heavyweight Champion and one time WWC World Tag Team Champion. He would retire from wrestling in 2014. Vélez only stayed in the developmental territory FCW and left WWE in August 2012 after frustrations with the company.

Matt Capiccioni, Ivelisse Vélez, and Martin Casaus would later wrestle for Lucha Underground as Son of Havoc, Ivelisse, and Marty "The Moth" Martinez, respectively. Capiccioni and Velez both won the Lucha Underground Trios Championship on multiple occasions, whereas Casaus won both Lucha Underground Championship and Lucha Underground Gift of the Gods Championship.

Jeremiah Riggs would return to Bellator MMA in 2012, going on to lose three fights in the promotion before completely retiring from MMA. He would later compete on a 2015 episode of Steve Austin's Broken Skull Challenge.

=== Season 6 ===
On January 15, 2015, season 6 of Tough Enough was announced at the Critics Association Winter Press. Daniel Bryan, Hulk Hogan, and Paige served as judges, while Billy Gunn, Booker T, and Lita served as trainers/coaches. The show aired live from the WWE Performance Center in Orlando, Florida - home base of WWE's NXT developmental territory. The winners, Josh and Sara, each received a $250,000 contract with WWE. On October 28, it was confirmed that Amanda, ZZ, Mada, Patrick, and Daria signed to a WWE contract. Amanda also appeared on the fifth season of WWE's reality television show Total Divas. A year later, Chelsea and Gabi signed with Total Nonstop Action Wrestling. Chelsea would later go onto sign a contract with WWE in 2018.

==== Hosts ====
- Chris Jericho (Host)
- Renee Young (Co-host)
- Byron Saxton (Tough Talk host, episodes 6–10)
- The Miz (Tough Talk host, episodes 1–5)

==== Judges ====
- Daniel Bryan
- Paige
- The Miz (episodes 6–10)
- Hulk Hogan (episodes 1–5)

==== Coaches ====
- Billy Gunn
- Booker T
- Lita

==== Guests ====
- Roman Reigns (episode 2)
- Bull Dempsey (episode 2)
- Seth Rollins (episode 3)
- King Barrett (episode 4)
- Natalya (episode 5)
- Big Show (episode 5)
- Cesaro (episode 6 & 10)
- Team B.A.D. (Naomi, Sasha Banks, and Tamina) (episode 6)
- The Prime Time Players (Darren Young and Titus O'Neil) (episode 7)
- John Cena (episode 8)
- Jason Jordan and Dana Brooke (episode 9)
- Alicia Fox (episode 10)
- Triple H (episode 10)

==== Contestants ====
* Amanda Saccomanno and Sara Lee were immune from elimination in episode 9 to ensure two female competitors advanced to the finale.

#	Contestants	Episodes									
#	Contestants	1	2	3	4	5	6	7	8	9	10
1	Joshua "Josh" Bredl	RISK	SAFE	SAFE	HIGH	RISK	HIGH	HIGH	HIGH	RISK	WINNER
1	Sara Lee	SAFE	RISK	RISK	RISK	SAFE	SAFE	RISK	RISK	SAFE	WINNER
3	Amanda Saccomanno	SAFE	SAFE	SAFE	SAFE	SAFE	SAVED	SAFE	SAFE	SAFE	RUNNER-UP
3	Zamariah "ZZ" Loupe	RISK	SAFE	RISK	SAFE	RISK	RISK	SAFE	SAFE	RISK	RUNNER-UP
5	Tanner Saraceno	HIGH	HIGH	SAFE	RISK	HIGH	HIGH	HIGH	RISK	OUT	
6	Giorgia "GiGi" Piscina	SAFE	HIGH	HIGH	HIGH	HIGH	HIGH	SAVED	OUT		
7	Chelsea Green				HIGH	SAFE	HIGH	OUT			
8	Mada Abdelhamid	SAFE	SAFE	SAFE	SAFE	HIGH	OUT				
9	Patrick Clark	SAFE	HIGH	HIGH	HIGH	OUT					
10	Gabi Castrovinci	SAFE	SAFE	SAFE	OUT						
11	Daria Berenato	SAFE	SAFE	OUT							
12	Dianna Dahlgren	HIGH	RISK	QUIT							
13	Alex Frekey	SAFE	OUT								
14	Hank Avery	OUT									

The contestant was one of the winners of the Tough Enough competition.
The contestant performed best in a skills challenge.
The contestant was safe from elimination.
The contestant was at risk of elimination.
The contestant was saved from elimination by a judge.
The contestant performed best in a skills challenge, but was at risk of elimination.
The contestant was selected to go into the finale.
The contestant was eliminated.
The contestant left the competition.
The contestant was not in the competition during this time.
The contestant was one of the runners-up.

==== Episodes ====
No. overall	No. in season	Title	Original release date	Prod. code	U.S. viewers (millions)
59	1	"Boot Camp or Bust"	June 23, 2015	601	1.21
After over 11,000 tough enough submission videos, 7 male and 6 female competitors have been selected to train both in and out of the ring and in a series of rigorous competitions for one-year, $250,000 WWE contracts. Hank ends up being sent home by the WWE Universe after being put in the bottom 3 by Daniel Bryan with ZZ put in by Hulk Hogan and Josh put in by Paige.
60	2	"Swamp Stories"	June 30, 2015	602	1.05
Things are heating up in the competition after Hank's elimination as the competitors have to race in a swamp to grab a replica NXT title and bring it back on shore. Sara Lee gets put in the bottom 3 by Paige for not standing out, Dianna gets put in the bottom 3 by Hulk Hogan for giving "mixed signals" and not having "locker room mentality" despite winning the Swamp challenge. However, this week, it ends up being Alex Frekey who gets eliminated by the WWE Universe for not stepping up physically and for his controversial "knowledge means nothing" comment aimed at Patrick Clark. Roman Reigns guest stars.
61	3	"Who Are You?"	July 7, 2015	603	1.21
The remaining competitors are baffled when they find out that Dianna has quit leaving only 10 competitors left in the competition. However, the judges still announce that there will be an elimination despite Dianna quitting. This week, it ends up being Daria that gets eliminated as she didn't deliver in the entrance challenge. WWE World Heavyweight Champion Seth Rollins guest stars.
62	4	"One Man Show"	July 14, 2015	604	0.98
(Dianna who quit the episode before gets replaced by Chelsea Green.) This episode's main challenge is about promo skills. Gabi Castrovinci, Sara Lee and Tanner don't step up promo wise and therefore are put in the bottom 3 by Daniel Bryan, Paige and Hulk Hogan respectively. It ends up being Gabi who is sent home out of the 3 of them though as she receives the lowest percentage of the votes. King Barrett guest stars.
63	5	"Swallow Your Pride, It's Good for You"	July 21, 2015	605	1.14
The nine remaining competitors learn about humility when they are put through an obstacle course that challenges them both mentally and physically. This week's voting for the bottom 3 is very close but in a shocking turn of events Patrick Clark ends up getting sent home for his perceived cockiness and lack of humility. Natalya and Big Show guest star.
64	6	"Remember to Be the Best"	July 28, 2015	606	0.98
Cesaro and Team B.A.D. (Naomi, Sasha Banks and Tamina Snuka) guest star. Note: The Miz replaced Hulk Hogan as a judge after WWE fired Hogan after it was revealed he used racial slurs.
65	7	"Spinning a Yarn"	August 4, 2015	607	0.85
The remaining competitors work together in the ring, showing the trainers and the judges their ability to work together well with their competition. They also work in two teams in a Fire Challenge. The Prime Time Players (Darren Young and Titus O'Neil) guest star.
66	8	"There's No 'I' in Team"	August 11, 2015	608	1.02
Chris Jericho visits the final six after the last elimination to get the inside scoop on how the competitors are really feeling with the competition. Also, the remaining competitors compete for the first time in-front of a live audience in a "Storytelling" challenge. John Cena guest stars.
67	9	"Friend or Foe?"	August 18, 2015	609	0.99
The final five come up with their own unique finisher, that shows their personality and in-ring persona. But, different from previous eliminations, the bottom three are already determined from the start of the week as the women already have their final two; the decision for the men's final two are up to the WWE Universe.
68	10	"A Champion is Crowned"	August 25, 2015	610	0.98
The final four contestants perform in live, televised matches against WWE Diva Alicia Fox (Amanda & Sara) and WWE Superstar Cesaro (Josh & ZZ). The winners of Tough Enough were crowned ultimately via fan voting.

==== Aftermath ====
Along with the two winners, the following finalists received developmental contracts right after the show ended: Amanda Saccomanno (later known as Mandy Rose), ZZ Loupe, Mada Abdelhamid, Patrick Clark, and Daria Berenato. Chelsea Green would eventually be signed in 2018 after a successful run in Impact Wrestling under the ring name "Laurel Van Ness".

Saccomanno, Berenato, and Green would eventually get called up to the main roster. Saccomanno wrestled under the ring name "Mandy Rose" and Berenato under the ring name "Sonya Deville". Green elected to wrestle under her real name. Clark would go on to win the NXT North American Championship under the ring name "Velveteen Dream". Sara Lee and ZZ Loupe were released in 2016. Josh Bredl was released in 2017 along with Mada Abdelhamid, who had requested for his own release. In April 2021, Chelsea Green was released from her WWE contract, with Patrick Clark being released the following month. Green returned to WWE at the 2023 Royal Rumble and, on July 17, 2023, Chelsea Green and Sonya Deville became the first pair of former female Tough Enough contestants to win the WWE Women's Tag Team Championship. Green and Scottish wrestler Piper Niven would later lose the belts, as Niven replaced Deville after the latter suffered an injury. Deville's WWE contract ended in 2025. Green became the inaugural Women's United States champion in December 2024, and won the WWE Women's Championship at the 2026 SummerSlam.

Gabi Castrovinci would go on to wrestle for Impact Wrestling from 2016 to 2017 under the ring name "Raquel". She has also go on to be a one time Shine Tag Team Champion.

Sara Lee worked with WWE NXT brand for a year. Afterwards she retired from wrestling and married Wesley Blake in 2017. They had 3 children. Lee died from alcohol poisoning on October 6, 2022.

== Winners ==
Year Won	Winners
2001	Maven Huffman
2001	Nidia Guenard
2002	Jackie Gayda
2002	Linda Miles
2003	John Hennigan
2003	Matt Cappotelli
2004	Daniel Puder
2011	Andy Leavine
2015	Joshua "Josh" Bredl
2015	Sara Lee

== See also ==
- WWE Diva Search
- WWE LFG
- TNA Gut Check
