= Sara Lee (wrestler) =

American professional wrestler (1992–2022)

- Lee in 2015

Personal information
- Born: Sara Ann Lee; June 7, 1992 Saginaw, Michigan, U.S
- Died: October 5, 2022 (aged 30) San Antonio, Texas, U.S
- Cause of death: Suicide by combined drug intoxication
- Education: Delta College
- Spouse: Wesley Blake (m. 2017)
- Children: 3

Professional wrestling career
- Ring names: Hope; Sara Lee
- Billed height: 5 ft 6 in (1.68 m)
- Billed weight: 125 lb (57 kg)
- Billed from: Hope, Michigan
- Trained by: Billy Gunn; Booker T; Lita; Sara Del Rey; Team Vision Dojo
- Debut: August 25, 2015
- Retired: September 30, 2016

Sara Ann Lee (June 7, 1992 – October 5, 2022) was an American television personality and professional wrestler, best known for her time in WWE. In 2015, she was the female winner of the sixth season of the WWE competition Tough Enough.

== Early life ==
Sara Ann Lee was born on June 7, 1992, in Saginaw, Michigan, the second child of Bob Lee and Terri Lee she has an older brother named Bobby Lee and raised in Hope Township, Michigan. She spent time in competitive powerlifting. She graduated from Meridian High School in 2010, and went on to study diagnostic medical sonography at Delta College in Bay City, Michigan.

== Professional wrestling career ==
In June 2015, Lee was one of the 13 finalists for the sixth season of the WWE competition Tough Enough. After being at risk of elimination five times throughout the course of the competition, on August 25, Lee was chosen by fan vote as one of the winners, along with Josh Bredl, earning a $250,000 one-year contract with WWE. During the final, Lee adopted the ring name Hope and lost a singles match to Alicia Fox.

In September, Lee was assigned to WWE's developmental territory NXT, based at the WWE Performance Center in Orlando, Florida, to begin training. Returning to her real name, Lee made her first appearance for NXT at a live event on January 16, 2016, when she delivered a heel promo. She made her in-ring debut at the January 30 live event during a six-woman tag team match, which also involved fellow Tough Enough competitor Mandy Rose. On September 30, 2016, Lee was released from her WWE contract.

== Personal life and suicide ==
Lee married Wesley Blake on December 30, 2017. They had three children named Piper Weston (born May 1, 2017) Brady Weston (born February 27, 2019) and Case Oliver Weston (born July 9, 2021). Lee and Blake's daughter Piper was seven months old when they got married. Lee was twenty five years old and Blake was thirty years old when they got married.

Lee died on October 5, 2022 at the age of thirty. On May 5, 2023, it was deemed by the Bexar County, Texas coroner that she committed suicide by a lethal overdose of alcohol and amphetamines and doxyelamine. At the time of Lee's death, Piper was five years old, Brady was three years old and Case was one year old.

== Championships and accomplishments ==
- WWE
  - Tough Enough VI – with Josh Bredl

== See also ==
- List of premature professional wrestling deaths
