= Böcker =

Böcker (German pronunciation: [ˈbœkɐ]) is a German-language surname. Notable people with the surname include:

- Conrad Böcker (1871–1936), German gymnast
- Thomas Böcker (born 1977), German music producer

== Other uses ==
- Böcker Maschinenwerke GmbH is the company that manufactured the furniture lift used in the 2025 Louvre robbery; the company gained attention after its humorous advertisement based on the robbery went viral.

== See also ==
- Bäcker
- Becker (disambiguation)
- Böckler
- Booker (name)
