= Alicia Fox =

American professional wrestler

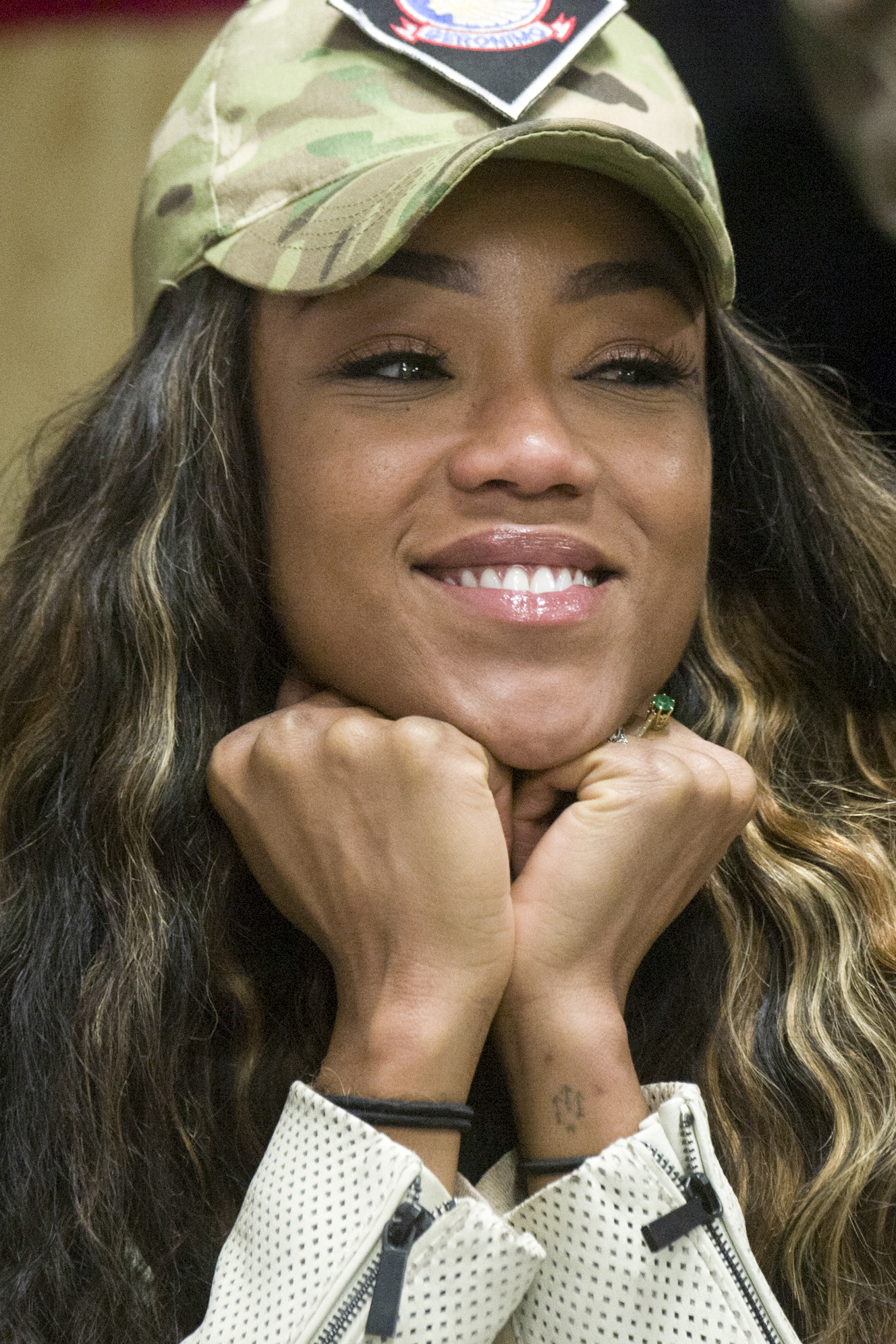
- Fox in 2017

Personal information
- Born: Victoria Elizabeth Crawford; June 30, 1986 (age 40) Ponte Vedra Beach, Florida, U.S.
- Family: Christina Crawford (sister); Randy Crawford (cousin)
- Website: vixcrow.com

Professional wrestling career
- Ring name(s): Alicia Fox; Tori; Victoria Crawford; Vix Crow
- Billed height: 5 ft 9 in (175 cm)
- Billed weight: 120 lb (54 kg)
- Billed from: Ponte Vedra Beach, Florida; Long Island, New York
- Trained by: Ohio Valley Wrestling; Florida Championship Wrestling
- Debut: July 1, 2006

Victoria Elizabeth Crawford (born June 30, 1986) is an American professional wrestler. She performs on the independent circuit under the ring name Vix Crow. She is best known for her seventeen-year tenure in WWE, where she performed under the ring name Alicia Fox.

Crawford debuted on SmackDown on June 13, 2008, using the Alicia Fox name and the gimmick of a wedding planner. In November, she moved to the ECW brand, where she managed DJ Gabriel. The following year, Fox began challenging for the WWE Divas Championship, which she won in June 2010, holding the title for two months, becoming the only African American Divas Champion. In October 2014, she began starring in the reality television series Total Divas on E! as a part of the main cast.

== Professional wrestling career ==
=== World Wrestling Entertainment/WWE (2006–2023) ===
==== Ohio Valley Wrestling (2006–2007) ====
In 2006, Crawford signed a developmental contract with World Wrestling Entertainment (WWE) and was assigned to Ohio Valley Wrestling (OVW), WWE's then-developmental territory. She debuted on July 1, 2006, as a special guest referee, under her real name, in a match between Shelly Martinez and ODB. On September 6, Crawford made her in-ring debut, under the new ring name Tori, in an OVW women's battle royal, in which she was eliminated by ODB. She spent the following month competing regularly in both singles and tag team matches, against opponents including Mickie James, ODB, and Katie Lea. In late September, she began managing Elijah Burke, accompanying him to the ring for matches against Chet The Jet. At the OVW television tapings on October 18, having reverted to her real name, Crawford challenged Beth Phoenix for the OVW Women's Championship, but lost following interference from Serena Deeb. Two days later, on October 20, Crawford won a gauntlet match at an OVW house show to win the OVW Women's Championship. The following night, however, Crawford lost the championship back to Phoenix, who won an eight-woman elimination match. Crawford's championship win is unrecognized by OVW, and the promotion considers Phoenix's two reigns as champion as a single, uninterrupted reign. Crawford continued to feud with Phoenix in early 2007, facing her in several tag team matches, in which Phoenix teamed with ODB and Crawford teamed with Lea or Deeb. Simultaneously, Crawford participated in the "Miss OVW" contest, which was won by ODB. Crawford had a series of matches with Milena Roucka in April, before moving onto a feud with Maryse Ouellet. Her final appearance in OVW was on July 21, when she participated in a three-way match for the OVW Women's Championship, which was won by ODB.

==== Florida Championship Wrestling (2007–2008) ====
Crawford debuted for WWE's new developmental territory Florida Championship Wrestling (FCW) on September 2, 2007, participating in a body contest. Her FCW in-ring debut came on September 25, where she and Nattie Neidhart defeated The Bella Twins (Brianna and Nicole) in a tag team match. She quickly began feuding with The Bella Twins, while allying herself with Neidhart. The Bella Twins defeated Crawford and Neidhart on two consecutive occasions, and on October 23, Crawford lost to Nicole in a singles match. A week later, she and Sheamus O'Shaunessy were defeated by Brianna and Kofi Kingston in a mixed tag team match. In December, Crawford teamed with Tommy Taylor in a loss to Brianna and Robert Anthony. The feud continued into 2008, with the Bellas defeating Crawford and Maryse Ouellet on January 8, and Crawford and Neidhart on January 19 and 29. Following the completion of the feud, Crawford began competing regularly against her former tag team partner, Neidhart. Neidhart won their first singles encounter on February 5 and was on the winning side of a tag team match on February 23, before Crawford won a singles match against her on February 26. Following her debut on SmackDown, Crawford changed her ring name to Alicia Fox. She began managing Jack Gabriel in September, and teamed with Gabriel in mixed tag team matches against Mike Kruel and Wesley Holiday and Gabe Tuft and Melina, while continuing to compete in singles competition as well. Fox competed in the Queen of FCW tournament between December 2008 and February 2009, defeating Jenny Quinn and Tiffany en route to the final, where she lost to Angela Fong.

==== Main roster debut and brand switches (2008–2010) ====
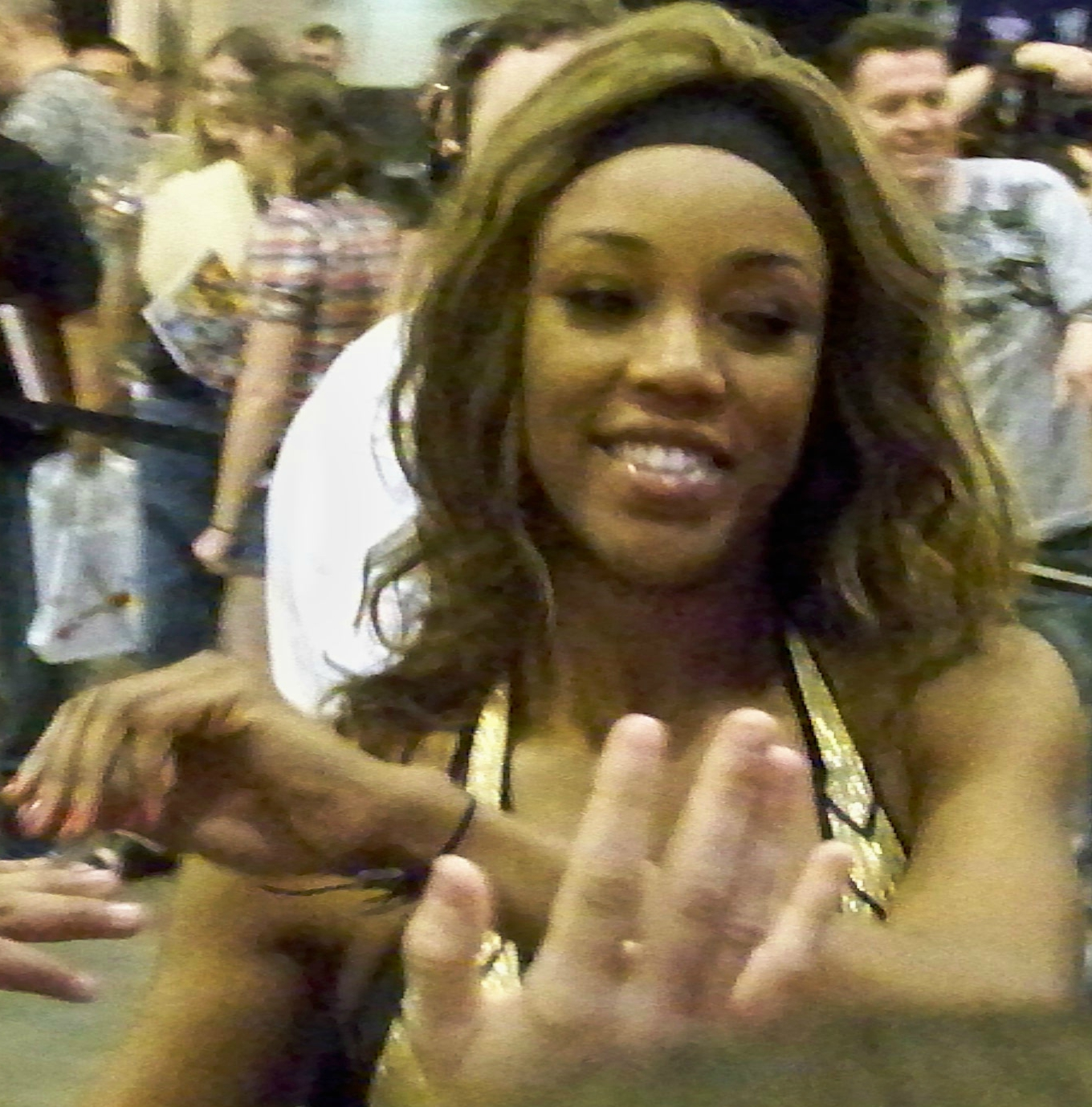
Fox in April 2009

Crawford debuted on WWE's main roster on the June 13, 2008, episode of SmackDown, as Alicia Fox, in a backstage segment with Vickie Guerrero, which saw her portraying Guerrero and Edge's wedding planner. During their wedding reception the following month, Triple H revealed Edge kissing Fox the day before the wedding on camera. Fox involved herself in the WWE Championship match at The Great American Bash when she attempted to help Edge, but she was stopped by Guerrero. The confusion surrounding her interference caused Edge to accidentally spear Guerrero.

After a three-month hiatus from television, Fox resurfaced on the November 18 episode of ECW, managing English wrestler DJ Gabriel, in a fan favorite role. Their on-screen association was explained by WWE claiming that Fox had moved her wedding planning business to England during her hiatus from WWE television, where she had met Gabriel. Gabriel and Fox began feuding with the Burchill siblings (Paul and Katie Lea) in late December 2008. Fox made her ECW in-ring debut on January 6, 2009, in a loss to Katie Lea. The following week, Gabriel and Fox defeated the Burchill siblings in a mixed tag team match, giving Fox her first win as part of the brand. In March, Fox and Gabriel feuded with Tyson Kidd and Natalya, with Natalya defeating Fox on March 3 episode of ECW. Fox competed in the 25 Diva battle royal at WrestleMania XXV on April 5, which was ultimately won by Santina Marella.

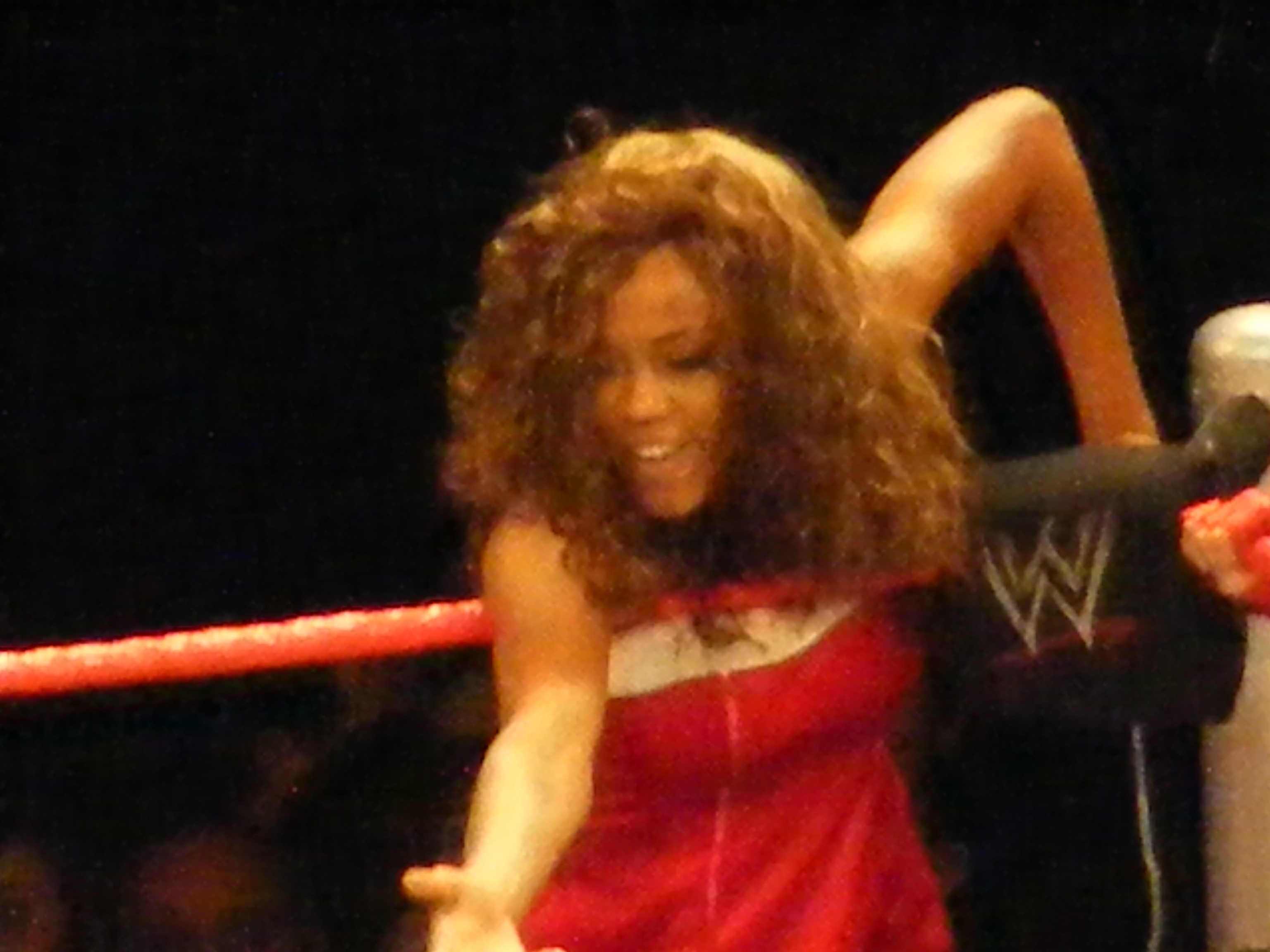
Fox in a Santa's Little Helper match at a WWE show in Syracuse in December 2009

Fox was drafted to the SmackDown brand as a part of the 2009 Supplemental Draft on April 15. She made her in-ring debut as a heel on the April 30 episode of WWE Superstars, teaming with Michelle McCool to defeat Maria and Gail Kim. After winning her debut match, Fox aligned herself with Michelle McCool, with the pair teaming together in tag team matches as well as accompanying each other to the ring for singles matches. Fox was in the corner of McCool when McCool won the WWE Women's Championship at The Bash. On June 29 it was announced that Fox had been traded to the Raw brand. The following week, she made her Raw debut in a tag team match, teaming with Maryse against Gail Kim and Mickie James in a losing effort. She gained her first victory on Raw on July 13, when Fox, Maryse, and Rosa Mendes won a six-Diva tag team match. Fox picked up her first pinfall victory by defeating Kelly Kelly during a tag team match on the July 20 episode of Raw. On the August 10 episode of Raw, Fox was involved in a fatal four-way match to determine the number one contender for the WWE Divas Championship, but was unsuccessful. The following month, on September 14, she defeated Gail Kim to become the number one contender to the Divas Championship. She received a match for the championship at Hell in a Cell against Mickie James on October 4, but was unsuccessful. Fox became the number one contender to the Divas Championship again on the November 2 episode of Raw, by winning a battle royal which involved The Bella Twins, Eve Torres, Gail Kim, and Kelly Kelly. She challenged Melina two weeks later for the championship, but was unsuccessful. Melina then vacated the Divas Championship due to injury, and a tournament was set up to determine the new champion in early January 2010. Fox defeated Kelly Kelly in the first round of the tournament, but later lost to Gail Kim in the semi-finals. Fox was on the winning team in a 10-Diva tag team match at WrestleMania XXVI, but on the losing side the following night in a rematch on Raw. On the April 5 episode of Raw, Fox was involved in a "Dress to Impress" battle royal to determine the number one contender to the WWE Divas Championship, but was unsuccessful, and the match was won by Eve Torres.

In May 2010, Fox began a storyline with Zack Ryder, after he requested that she and Gail Kim be ringside on several occasions to watch his matches, so he could impress them and find a new valet. During his match with Evan Bourne on May 10, Fox interfered on Ryder's behalf, but was stopped by Gail Kim. The following week, Bourne and Kim defeated Ryder and Fox in a mixed tag team match. After the match, Fox attacked Ryder in order to collect a "bounty" from the Raw guest host, Ashton Kutcher.

==== Divas Champion and NXT (2010–2011) ====
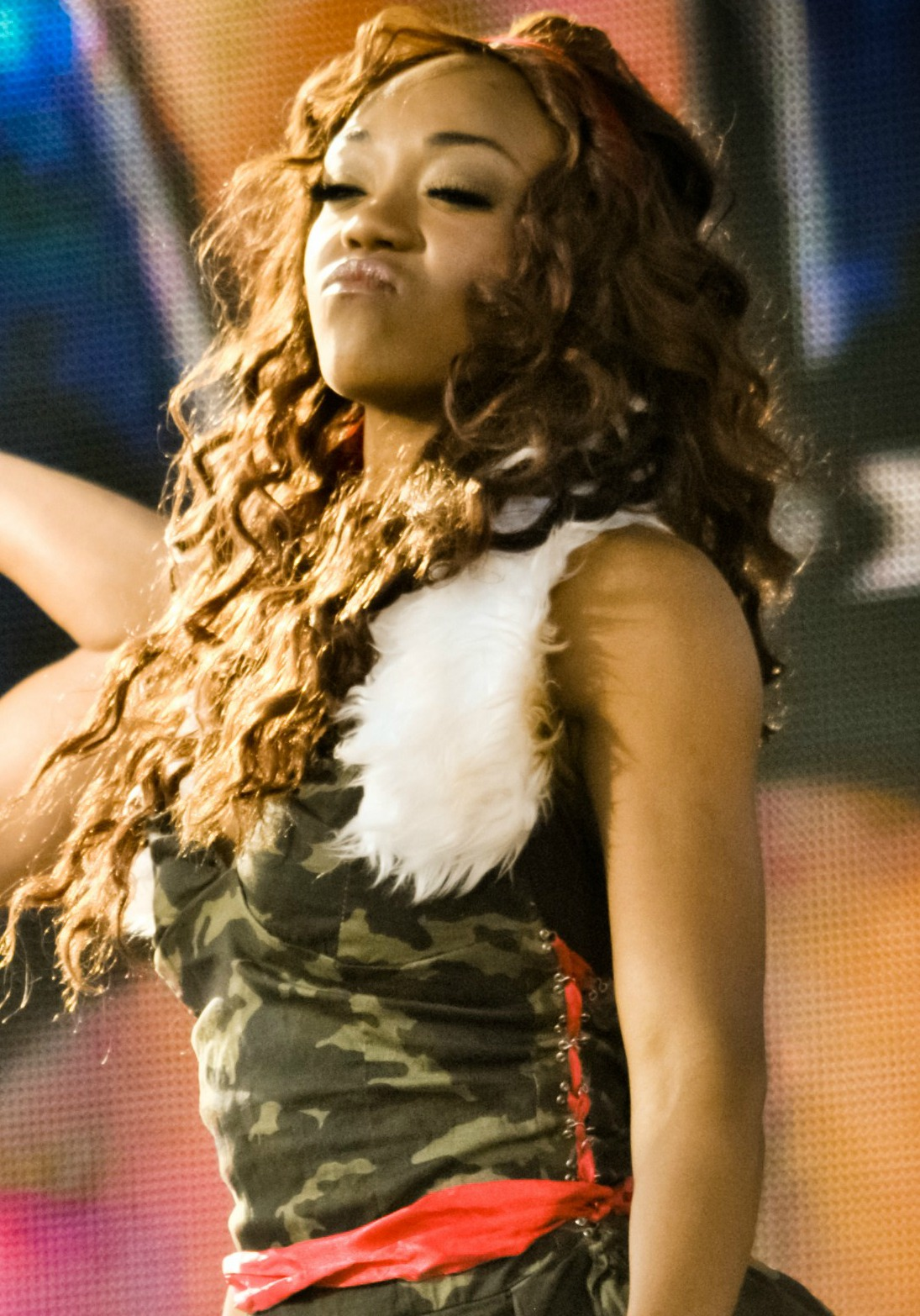
Alicia Fox at the 2010 Tribute to the Troops event

On June 20, 2010, at the Fatal 4-Way pay-per-view, Fox competed in a fatal four-way match for the WWE Divas Championship, which also involved Gail Kim, Eve Torres, and Maryse. Fox pinned Maryse to win the championship for the first time, and as a result became the only African American wrestler to win the title. In her first title defence, on the July 5 episode of Raw, Fox successfully defended the championship against Eve after feigning an ankle injury and as a result, Eve was granted a rematch at Money in the Bank by Raw's anonymous General Manager, where Fox was again able to retain the championship. In August, Melina returned from an injury and attacked Fox, after the latter declared herself to be undefeatable and the greatest champion in history. After defeating Fox in a non-title match on Raw, Melina was granted a title shot, on August 15, at SummerSlam, which she won, ending Fox's reign at 56 days.

On August 31, Fox was announced as the mentor of Maxine for the all-female third season of NXT but Maxine failed to win the competition, and was the second rookie Diva to be eliminated. Later in the summer, Fox and Eve Torres were the first ever female performers in WWE to wrestle a match in China, during WWE's first ever live-event in the country, which was held in Shanghai. Fox later received a rematch for the Divas Championship against Melina on the September 6 episode of Raw, which she lost. In December, Fox competed in a battle royal to determine the winner of the "Diva of the Year" Slammy Award, but was eliminated by Natalya and also took part of a triple-threat number one contender's match, which was won by Melina.

==== Various feuds (2011–2013) ====
On April 26, 2011, Fox was drafted back to the SmackDown brand as part of the 2011 supplemental draft and in her first match back for the brand she was defeated by Layla and suffered a shoulder injury after being attacked by Kharma, following the loss. On the May 27 episode of SmackDown, in her return, Fox and Tamina Snuka defeated the team of Kaitlyn and AJ Lee, which later transitioned into a feud between the two sets of Divas, with Fox and Tamina regularly winning tag team matches and allying with Rosa Mendes. The alliance between Fox and Tamina ended on the August 11 episode of WWE Superstars, when Fox defeated Tamina in a singles match.

After a tag team match, which they lost, on the August 19 episode of SmackDown, Fox was attacked by Natalya, which provoked a feud between the two. She began acting as a face while wrestling alongside several different Divas to face Natalya and Beth Phoenix, collectively known as The Divas of Doom, in tag team matches, and also regularly competing against them in singles matches. As part of the storyline, Fox also prevented Natalya and Phoenix from attacking other Divas, including Kelly Kelly and AJ. The storyline continued sporadically throughout the first half of 2012, with Fox losing tag team and singles matches to Phoenix and Natalya.

Fox spent the remainder of 2012 and early 2013 competing in sporadic matches, usually on the losing side. In mid–2013, Fox appeared on the rebooted NXT, entering a tournament to determine the inaugural NXT Women's Champion, where she defeated Bayley in the first round, but lost to Paige in the semi-finals.

==== Total Divas storylines (2013–2015) ====
In September, Fox took part of the WWE Divas Champion AJ Lee's team which feuded with the cast of the Total Divas reality television show, which led to a traditional seven-on-seven Survivor Series match, in which Fox was the first to be eliminated, courtesy of Naomi.

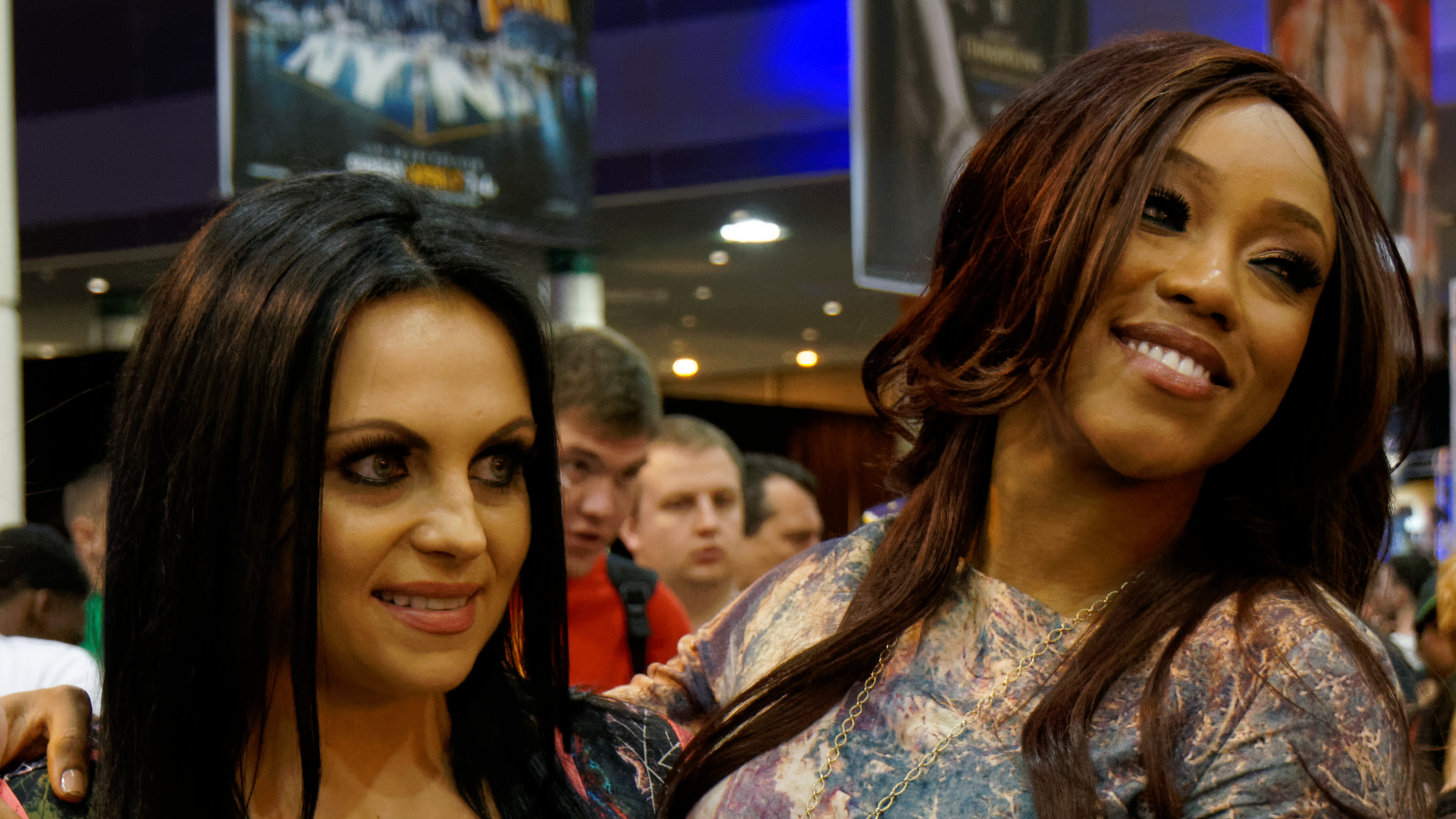
"Foxsana" Aksana (left) and Alicia Fox (right) in April 2014

Since January 2014, Fox formed a tag team with Aksana, later dubbed "Foxsana". On April 6, Fox competed at WrestleMania XXX in the 14-Diva "Vickie Guerrero Invitational match" for the WWE Divas Championship, which was won by the defending champion AJ Lee. After that, Fox started a feud with the newly crowned WWE Divas Champion Paige, losing to her in a series of matches on Raw, Main Event, and WWE Superstars. Her losses provoked a storyline, in which she lost her temper after matches, taunting the ring announcers, ringside crew, and crowd and defacing the ringside area. Fox was eventually able to defeat Paige on Raw on May 19 in a non-title match and celebrated by taking Jerry Lawler's crown afterwards. Her victory set up a title match between the two at Payback, on June 1, which Fox lost. Following a further loss to Paige on June 9, Fox attacked tag team partner Aksana, before defeating her in a match on SmackDown, officially disbanding Foxsana. Fox subsequently entered into a feud with Nikki Bella after being appointed by Stephanie McMahon to berate her in a series of handicap matches. Meanwhile, Fox continued to throw temper tantrums during her matches throughout the summer, and even tormented Tom Phillips in a number of backstage segments on the WWE App.

After a hiatus, Fox returned to WWE television, on the September 29 episode of Raw, where she defeated AJ Lee, with the help of her former rival Paige and subsequently, formed an alliance with her, and went on to pick up another win over AJ on October 20. However, when Fox inadvertently cost Paige a title match at Hell in a Cell, Paige dissolved the alliance by attacking her the following night on Raw. This prompted a traditional four-on-four elimination tag team match, with each captaining a side, at the Survivor Series pay-per-view in November, where Fox's team won the match with a clean sweep. In January 2015, Fox developed a rivalry with Naomi, during which she formed a brief alliance with The Miz and Damien Mizdow, and the trio went on to defeat Naomi and The Usos in a series of mixed tag team matches. On the April 13 episode of Raw, Fox competed in a number one contender's battle royal for Nikki Bella's WWE Divas Championship, which would be won by Paige.

==== Women's revolution (2015–2017) ====
On June 15, 2015, Fox was a part of the Divas that Paige tried to rally on Raw in an attempt to take a stand against The Bella Twins and join her, but no one accepted the offer. Three days later on SmackDown, Fox assisted Brie Bella in her match against Paige, and thus aligning herself with The Bella Twins and formed "Team Bella". After weeks of Team Bella outnumbering Paige, Naomi, and Tamina, Stephanie McMahon called for a "revolution" in the WWE Divas Division by introducing the debuting Charlotte and Becky Lynch as Paige's allies, and NXT Women's Champion Sasha Banks aligning with Naomi and Tamina, leading to a brawl between the three teams. The three teams would ultimately face off, on August 23, at SummerSlam in a three team elimination match. Team Bella would first eliminate Team B.A.D. when Brie Bella pinned Tamina, however Team PCB would win the match after Brie was pinned by Becky Lynch. On the August 25 episode of Tough Enough, Fox made a special appearance on the finale of the sixth season, wrestling finalists Amanda and eventual winner Sara Lee. While Nikki Bella was off television with an injury, Fox spent the remainder of 2015 competing occasionally in singles matches and tag team matches with Brie Bella.

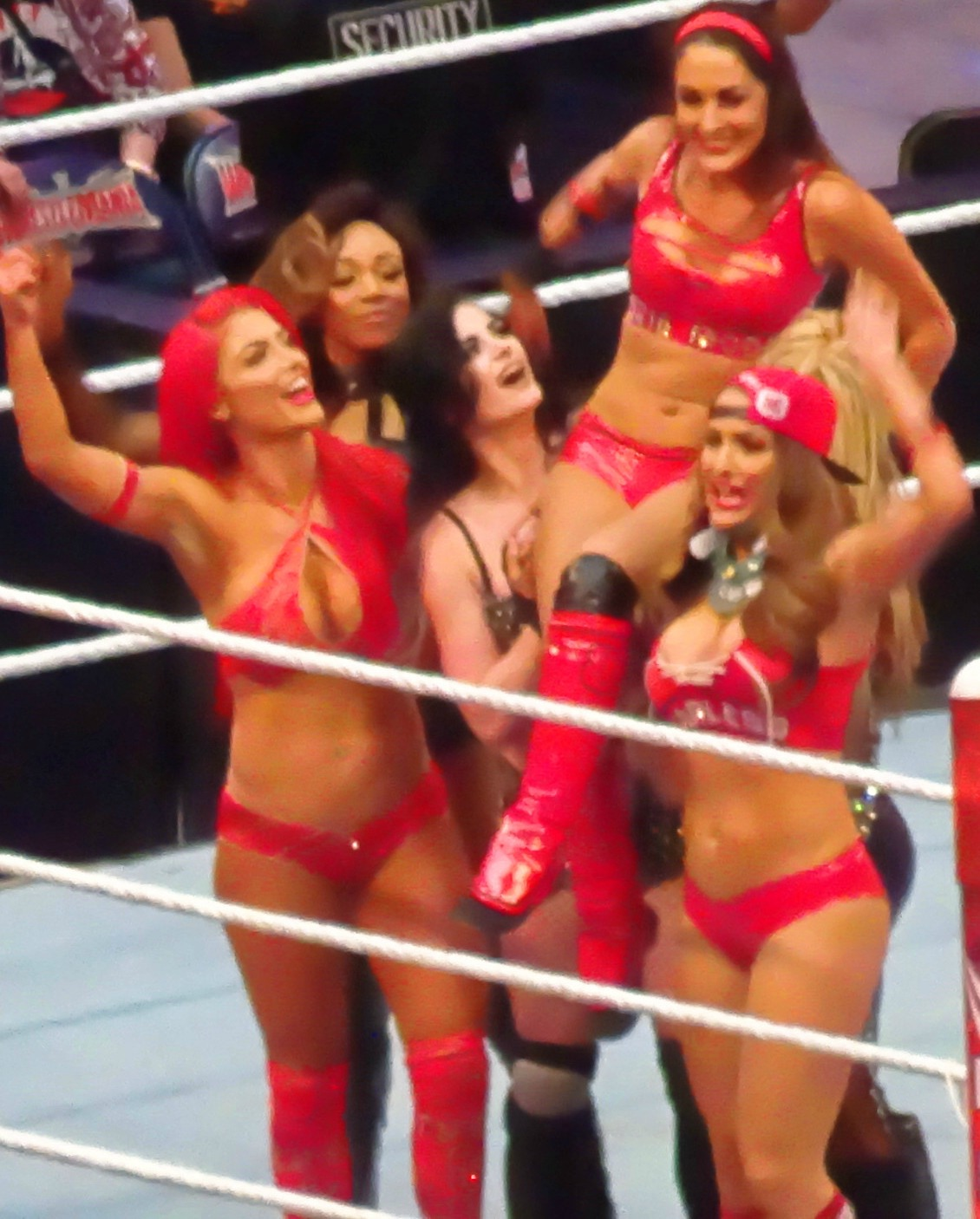
Fox (second left) celebrating with her fellow Total Divas co-stars in their victory at WrestleMania 32 in April 2016

On the March 14, 2016, episode of Raw, Fox and Brie were defeated by Team B.A.D. following a distraction provided by Lana. After this match, Team Bella quietly disbanded and both Fox and Brie transitioned into fan favorites. On the March 22 episode of Main Event, she and Natalya accompanied Paige to her match against Naomi, where Paige was defeated following a distraction provided by Summer Rae and a returning Emma. The following week, Fox, Brie, and Natalya accompanied Paige to her rematch against Emma on the March 28 episode of Raw. After the match, she along her allies were attacked by Team B.A.D., before they were saved by a returning Eva Marie. As a result, a 10-Diva tag team match between Team Total Divas (Bella, Fox, Natalya, Eva Marie and Paige) and the newly dubbed Team B.A.D. and Blonde (Naomi, Tamina, Lana, Emma, and Summer Rae) was announced for the WrestleMania 32 pre-show. On April 3, Fox's team emerged victorious at the event after Naomi submitted to Bella. Later that month, Fox became the first female performer in WWE history to appear in front of a live crowd in the Middle-East, where she kicked off the show in Dubai.

After being drafted to Raw as part of the 2016 WWE draft which took place on July 19, Fox made her first appearance for the brand on August 15, where she was defeated by Charlotte Flair. On the September 5 episode of Raw, Fox was involved in a backstage confrontation with Nia Jax, resulting in a match between the two on the September 12 episode of Raw, which would end in a no contest after Jax speared Fox through the ringside barricade. On September 25, a rematch took place at Clash of Champions, where Fox was defeated. After suffering a streak of losses, Fox scored a victory over Dana Brooke on the November 4 episode of Superstars. On the November 7 episode of Raw, Fox was announced as one of the participants in the 5-on-5 Traditional Survivor Series Women's Elimination match at Survivor Series from her brand's team, before winning a six-woman tag team match along with her fellow team partners. At the event on November 20, Fox's team emerged victorious after Bayley pinned Becky Lynch.

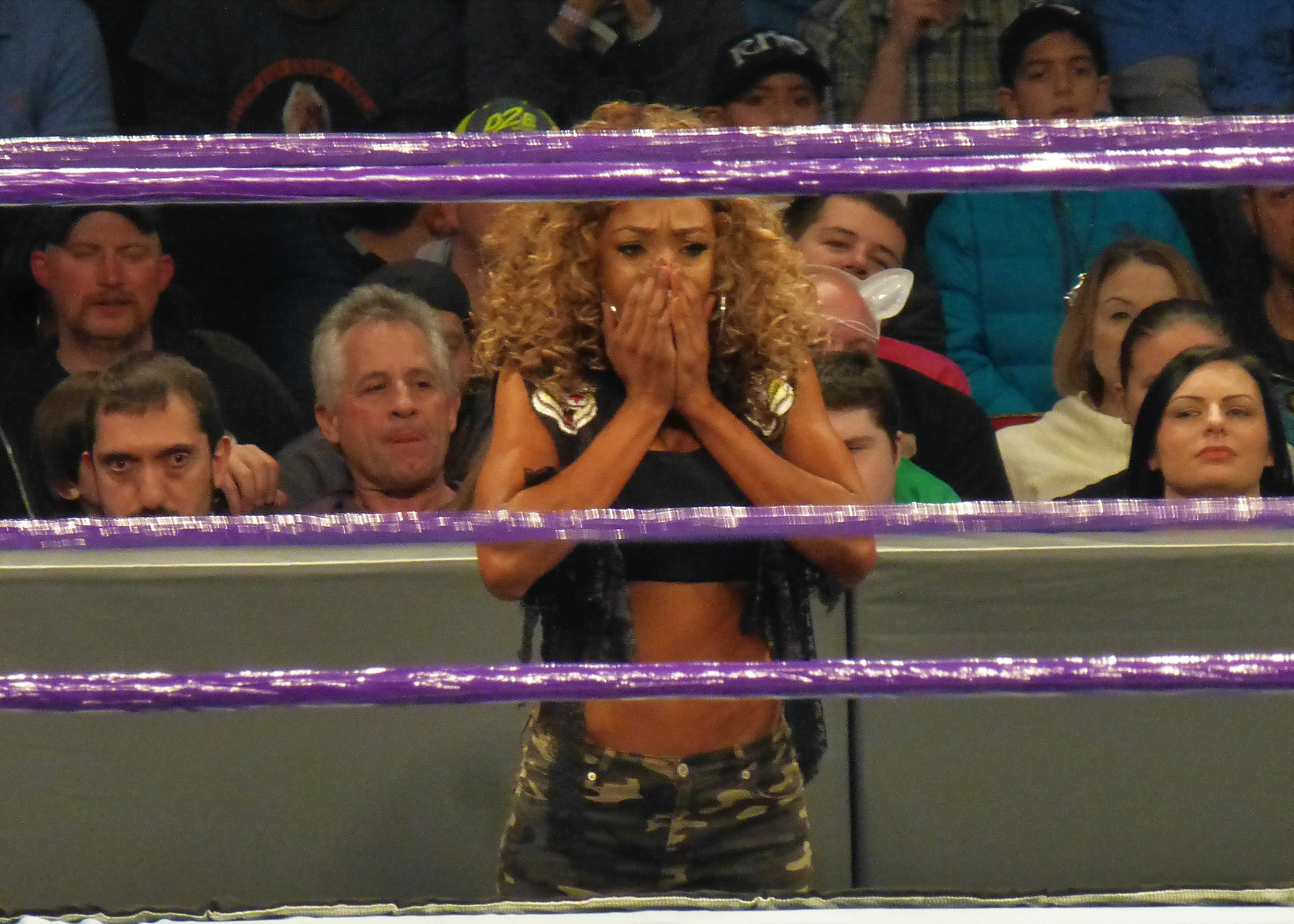
Fox valeting at WWE 205 Live in 2016

==== Managerial run and singles competition (2017–2018) ====
On the December 6 episode of 205 Live, Fox started an on-screen relationship with Cedric Alexander by kissing him before his match against Noam Dar, in which Alexander was defeated. Dar dedicated his victory to Fox. Two weeks later on Raw, Fox accompanied Alexander in a rematch against Dar, where he was victorious. Dar attempted to seduce her again afterwards. On January 10, 2017, an incensed Fox threw a backstage fit after Alexander severed ties with her on 205 Live, following her interference during his match with Dar, which eventually costed him the match. Subsequently, Fox became Dar's new valet. During this time, she began receiving gifts during matches on 205 Live, which Dar passed off as his. On one occasion, Fox was seen eating the flowers gifted to her at ringside, slowly displaying traits of her "crazy" gimmick again. It was eventually revealed that the sender of these gifts was Rich Swann, who subsequently turned down Fox as an act of revenge against her for Cedric Alexander, as she threw another fit. On June 4, Fox and Dar were defeated by Rich Swann and Sasha Banks in a mixed tag team match at Extreme Rules. Fox would continue to manage Dar as their relationship On the July 11 episode of 205 Live, Dar broke up with Fox after he lost to Alexander in an "I Quit" match.

Throughout the summer, Fox competed in different matches in all of which she ended up being on the losing side. In October, Fox reignited her feud with Sasha Banks, after she lost to Banks on Raw and attacked her backstage afterwards. This led to a rematch between the two, that took place at the TLC kickoff show, in which Banks once again defeated Fox via submission. The following night on Raw, Fox defeated Banks and Bayley to become the team captain of the Raw women's team for Survivor Series. During the five-on-five elimination tag team match, Fox was eliminated by Naomi, however, her team was victorious. In December, Fox faced off with the recently debuted Asuka whom she was unsuccessful in defeating. Fox and the rest of the women's roster soon entered into a feud with Absolution which included the returning Paige, as well as the debuting Mandy Rose and Sonya Deville.

Fox was scheduled to participate in the first women's royal rumble match at Royal Rumble on January 28, 2018, but was pulled off the event following an injury and replaced by Kairi Sane. She was also replaced by Mandy Rose in the Mixed Match Challenge.

==== Final feuds (2018–2019) ====
Six months after being off television, on the June 25, 2018, episode of Raw, Fox appeared in a backstage segment being welcomed back by Bayley. Two weeks later, in her first match back, Fox teamed with Dana Brooke in a match against Sasha Banks and Bayley, however, the match ended in a no contest after a brawl started outside the ring between the two duos. In July, Fox started an alliance with Alexa Bliss, who helped her defeat Natalya. After a post-match attack on Ronda Rousey, who was at ringside for Natalya, Fox was announced to be Rousey's first singles opponent. A week later, Fox competed against Rousey in a losing effort, which served as the main event of Raw, marking Fox's first main event match of her career.

In October, while Alexa Bliss and Mickie James started a feud with WWE Hall of Famers Trish Stratus and Lita, Fox began teaming up with Jinder Mahal as they were announced as participants in the upcoming season 2 of Mixed Match Challenge. James and Bliss were supposed to face Stratus and Lita at WWE Evolution, the first ever all women's pay-per-view. However, just three days before the event, on October 25, it was announced that Bliss was pulled off the match due to a concussion she suffered beforehand and Fox will replace her, in which an emotional Fox claimed was the most important match of her entire career. At the event, Fox and James lost to Stratus and Lita after Stratus pinned James. In December, Fox and Jinder Mahal defeated Ember Moon and Curt Hawkins in the quarterfinals and Bayley and Apollo Crews in the semi-finals to qualify to the finals of the tournament. At the TLC: Tables, Ladders & Chairs pay-per-view, Fox and Mahal lost to Carmella and R-Truth in the finals of the Mixed Match Challenge after Carmella submitted Fox. Throughout the rest of 2018, with Bliss out of in-ring competition, Fox was paired with Mickie James as the two continued to team up in various matches.

It was reported on February 10, 2019, that Fox showed up to a live event intoxicated. The producer for the match, Arn Anderson, was blamed for allowing her to perform in her condition. Following this, and other backstage issues he had with management, Anderson was released from his contract. Fox's first appearance since was at WrestleMania 35's WrestleMania Axxess in April, however she was not announced as a participant at the event. In her return to in-ring action, Fox competed against Becky Lynch on the April 22 episode of Raw and alongside Tamina against Billie Kay and Peyton Royce the following week on Main Event on May 2, 2019, respectively, both resulting in losses. The two matches would end up being Fox's final in WWE as an active performer. She made an on-screen appearance on the Raw Reunion episode on July 22, 2019, where she was billed as a WWE Legend amongst other former Superstars. After months of inactivity, her WWE.com profile was moved to the alumni section on October 17, and she was no longer listed as a full-time competitor with the company, having been moved to a legends contract. Her last advertised appearance on behalf of the company was at a pre-Wrestlemania fan event on November 13, 2019, before she went on hiatus.

==== Sporadic appearances and departure (2021–2023) ====
After more than a year of inactivity, Fox was advertised as a legend for the January 4, 2021, episode of Raw Legends Night where she was seen backstage with Angel Garza and wrestling legend Mickie James and later at the main event as a spectator with several other Legends. A few weeks later, she made a surprise return at the number 21 entry at the Royal Rumble, where she also pinned an interfering R-Truth to win the 24/7 Championship, becoming the first-ever female African American 24/7 Champion as well as the third Superstar, after Triple H and Ric Flair, to win a Championship during a Royal Rumble match. Truth immediately won the title back from Fox after she was eliminated by Mandy Rose, and was subsequently chased by her and other male superstars, who were in pursuit of the Championship. In April, she appeared on stage, during the opening of WrestleMania 37 alongside the rest of the active roster.

Fox returned once again at the number 21 spot the following year in the 2022 Royal Rumble as a surprise entry, lasting over six minutes. She was eliminated, following a brief Team Bella reunion, by Nikki Bella.

During an interview with Athletes Voices in early 2023, Crawford stated that she was still signed with WWE, however on May 1, 2023, Crawford confirmed that she is no longer working for WWE in her social media accounts ending her 17-year tenure with the company.

==== Return under TNA umbrella (2025–present) ====
In September 2025, Crawford, under her real name, appeared on an NXT taping as part of the TNA invasion leading up to NXT vs. TNA Showdown. Although she was not selected by Santino Marella to compete in the event, she participated a week later in the Halloween Havoc No. 1 Contender’s Battle Royal, where she was eliminated by Jordynne Grace, thus marking her first WWE match since 2022.

=== Independent circuit (2023–present) ===
In May 2023, Crawford confirmed in an interview that she intended to make a return to pro-wrestling, denying retirement rumors. She made her first wrestling appearance outside of WWE at Booker T's promotion, Reality of Wrestling at the July 15 Summer of Champions show, using the ring name Vix Crow, confronting Promise Braxton who won a battle royal.

Following a handful of appearances, including appearances as a referee, Crow made her wrestling return in 2024 at Starrcast's HER event in Ballarat, Australia on 12 April, defeating Mickie James with an Implant Buster, marking her first singles match since 2019. She continued to compete in the independent circuit through the summer of 2024 against the likes of Hyan and Seleziya Sparx. On 1 December, Crow defeated Jordynne Grace at Ladies Night Out 14 pay-per-view, that took place at Wrestlecade.

=== Total Nonstop Action Wrestling (2025–2026) ===
Crawford made a one-night appearance as an audience member at TNA Unbreakable on April 17, 2025. She briefly got involved during the mixed tag team match between Joe Hendry, Masha Slamovich, Frankie Kazarian and Tessa Blanchard after distracting Slamovich. It was later announced that Crawford would make her TNA in-ring debut at Under Siege against Masha Slamovich for the TNA Knockouts World Championship, and would be performing under her real name. For the remainder of 2025, she and Blanchard were managed by Robert Stone in their pursuit of the TNA Knockouts World Tag Team Championship. On July 24, 2026, Crawford was released from TNA.

== Other media ==
In 2013, Crawford (as Alicia Fox) made an appearance on the television series Cupcake Wars, as a guest judge along with Layla. The following year, she and The Miz presented an award at Cartoon Network's Hall of Game Awards. She made guest appearances for the reality television show Total Divas produced by WWE and E! during the first two seasons, which began airing in July 2013 and as a co-host with Renee Young on the post-show YouTube series, After Total Divas. In October 2014, she joined the main cast of the program for the second half of the third season, which began airing in January 2015, and continued until 2017.

Crawford made her acting debut by guest starring in two episodes of Syfy series Dominion that aired in July 2015.

Crawford (as Alicia Fox) has appeared in nine WWE video games. She made her in-game debut in WWE SmackDown vs Raw 2011 and appears in WWE '12 (DLC), WWE 13, WWE 2K16, WWE 2K17,WWE 2K18, WWE 2K19, WWE 2K20 and WWE 2K Battlegrounds.

In July 2017, it was revealed that Fox would feature in the debut line of WWE fashion dolls by toy brand Mattel. In October, WWE launched Alicia Fox apparel in the form of t-shirts on their website.

== Filmography ==
Film
Year	Title	Role	Notes
2017	The Jetsons & WWE: Robo-WrestleMania!	Herself	Film debut; straight-to-video
Television
Year	Title	Role	Notes
2013–2018	Total Divas	Herself	Guest (seasons 1–2, 7–8); Main cast (seasons 3–5); Recurring (season 6): 35 episodes
2013	Cupcake Wars	Herself	Guest Judge
2015	Dominion	Harper	Episodes: "Heirs of Salvation" and "Mouth of the Damned"
2015	WWE Tough Enough	Herself	Episode: "A Champion is Crowned"
2015-2016	Swerved	Herself	5 episodes
2016	Ride Along	Herself	1 episode
2016	WWE 24	Herself	Episode: “Women’s Evolution”
2017	Total Bellas	Herself	Episodes: "The Wrong Move" & "Bella-Mania"
2018	Drop the Mic	Herself	Episode: "WWE Superstars vs. GLOW / Laila Ali vs. Chris Jericho"
2018	WWE Game Night	Herself	1 episode
2018	WWE Kitchen SmackDown	Herself	1 episode

== Personal life ==
Crawford has a younger sister named Christina, who was also a professional wrestler and Tampa Bay Buccaneers cheerleader, and now works as a real estate broker. Prior to becoming a professional wrestler, Crawford was a model and signed with WWE after being seen in a fashion catalogue along with Kelly Kelly, by John Laurinaitis.

Between 2010 and 2012, Crawford was in a relationship with English wrestler Stu Bennett, who she remained friends with after their split. In October 2022, Crawford announced her engagement to musician Michael Fitzgerald. The two married in October 2024.

In 2017, during an interview on Lilian Garcia's podcast, Chasing Glory, Crawford explained that she suffered from anxiety due to alcohol abuse-related issues in the family. In November 2018, she also disclosed via her social media accounts that she suffered from blindness in one eye for nearly three years during high school. Later in 2019, Crawford revealed that she had been battling alcoholism and had gone into recovery following her hiatus from professional wrestling. While being away from the wrestling limelight, it was revealed by Brie Bella on the July 15, 2020, episode of The Bellas Podcast, that Crawford was now in school. In April 2022, Jim Ross revealed that Crawford has been sober for three years.

== Championships and accomplishments ==
- Ohio Valley Wrestling
  - OVW Women's Championship (1 time) (Note: The reign is not recognized by OVW.)
- Pro Wrestling Illustrated
  - Ranked No. 17 of the top 50 female wrestlers in the PWI Female 50 in 2010
- World Wrestling Entertainment/WWE
  - WWE Divas Championship (1 time)
  - WWE 24/7 Championship (1 time)
- Wrestling Observer Newsletter
  - Worst Feud of the Year (2015) Team PCB vs. Team B.A.D. vs. Team Bella
  - Worst Worked Match of the Year (2013) with AJ Lee, Aksana, Kaitlyn, Rosa Mendes, Summer Rae, and Tamina Snuka vs. Brie Bella, Cameron, Eva Marie, JoJo, Naomi, Natalya, and Nikki Bella on November 24
