= Charles Goodenough Booker =

Charles Goodenough Booker (April 24, 1859 – April 3, 1926) was the mayor of Hamilton, Ontario from 1917 to 1920.

In 1904, Booker ran for the Board of Education in Ward 1 unsuccessfully. In 1906, he successfully sought the post again and served for nine years. In 1915, he was chairman of the board.

When he ran for mayor in 1917, he was not expected to win. He was subsequently re-elected until 1920.
