= Michael Dennis Booker =

American lawyer and politician

Michael Dennis Booker is an American lawyer and former state legislator in Arkansas. He lived in Little Rock, Arkansas and served in the Arkansas House of Representatives in the 1990s.

Booker was reprimanded by the Committee on Professional Conduct in 2004.
