= Trevor Booker (footballer) =

English footballer (born 1969)

Personal information
- Full name: Trevor Christopher Booker
- Date of birth: 26 February 1969 (age 57)
- Place of birth: Lambeth, England
- Position: Forward

Senior career*
Years	Team	Apps	(Gls)
1986–1987	Millwall	3	(0)
1987–1991	Welling United	146	(29)
1991–1992	Fisher Athletic	?	(?)
- * Club domestic league appearances and goals

Trevor Christopher Booker (born 26 February 1969) is an English former professional footballer who played in the Football League, as a forward. He was born in Lambeth.
