= Peter Jeffrey Booker =

Peter Jeffrey Booker (19 August 1924 – 16 April 2011) was a British engineer and technological drawing historian, known for his 1963 A History of Engineering Drawing, a seminal work on the history of technical drawing.

== Life and work ==
Booker was born in Cambridge in August 1924. He received his secondary education at the Sandown Secondary School at the Isle of Wight, and subsequently attended the Royal Naval Artificers Training Establishment, Torpoint at Cornwall.

From 1940 to 1954 he served in the Royal Navy, where he worked in the Ordnance Department. He started on gun mountings, and later worked in gunnery fire control equipment on ships, in workshops and in the drawing office. In 1954 he became assistant secretary at the Institution of Engineering Designers and was representative of the institute on the City St Guilds Advisory Committee on Mechanical Engineering Drawing. Brooker became editor of The Engineering Designer and member of the Newcomen Society.

In the 1950s and 1960s Brooker published most of his work on engineering drawing and its history. He received several rewards for his work, among them the Founder Column awarded by the Institution of Engineering Designers. He continued to work at the Institution of Engineering Designers, and in the year 1992–93 was elected director of the institute for one year.

Booked died in Woking, Surrey, in April 2011 at the age of 86.

== Work ==
=== A History of Engineering Drawing, 1963 ===
In a 1965 review of A History of Engineering Drawing Chilton summarised the intention of this work:

... Booker is mostly concerned with engineering drawing in this history, and in particular of communication via the representation of three-dimensional objects on a two-dimensional surface; a means of communication, that is between the designer and constructor, since this particular communication must convey not only the qualitative aspects of the design but also provide the detailed dimensions that are ultimately necessary before the design be realised.

This work is regarded as the standard history of engineering drawing. Its first chapters deal with:

1. Introducing shadows and projection
2. The fundamental nature of drawing
3. Representing attributes in drawings
4. Perspective: projection applied to pictures
5. Plans and multi-view drawings
6. Constructional drawings: sun-dialling and stone-cutting
7. Ships and forts: water‐lines, and figured plans, and
8. Plans and multi‐view drawings...

Another 1978 review revealed more of the content:

Other specific chapter headings include ... "The American Scene: Third Angle Projection" (and the divergences between the UK and European "first angle" projection and the US and Canadian "third quadrant" projection), "Descartes: Linking Geometry and Algebra" ... In a chapter entitled "Conventions and Standards in Drawing", it seems that although textbooks had done much to unify drawing practice, the war years 1914–18 highlighted the inherent difficulties in nonstandard drawing practices. As is usual in time of war concerted efforts were made to improve the situation so that shortly afterwards British Standard Drawing Office Practice first appeared.

The techniques of sun-dialling and stone-cutting drawing also warrant separate treatment in that these two areas required solutions to three-dimensional problems, detailed examples of which are fully set out and explained.

The second 1979 edition of this work was enlarged and revised and contained 19 chapters.

=== Pioneers of engineering drawing ===
In A History of Engineering Drawing, Brooker goes more into details about the lives, work and accomplishments of engineering designers. For example, he explained:

... as early pictures were primarily concerned with events, stories or actions, and depicted people, the Greeks although sophisticated in geometry did not develop perspective projection simply because there was no motivation to do so! The first principles of projection, in fact, are credited to the Florentine goldsmith turned painter and sculptor born Paulo di Dono in 1397, but more popularly known as Paolo Uccello. Later artists of the 15th and 16th centuries used and modified his ideas in developing their own methods.

About this period several mathematicians and experimenters began to study perspective on a scientific basis, and indeed worked examples of the science which we now know as photogrammetry developed early in this century to elucidate true information from photographs, i.e., to work perspective "backwards".

The 1978 review of this work also stipulated:

... there are copious illustrations from the works not only of these early pioneers, but throughout the entire book and including computer-drawn "drafting feasibility studies" based on what we call today "computational geometry" but actually derived from the analytical geometry of the great French geometrician Gaspard Monge born in 1746 near Dijon, and to whose work a whole chapter is devoted. Another pioneer and contemporary of Monge, the Englishman the Rev William Farish, has a chapter to himself which describes his investigations and development of isometric drawing.

=== Primary and secondary geometry ===
In A History of Engineering Drawing Booker made the distinction between primary and secondary geometry. As Riley (2010) explained:

[Primary geometry is] the arrangement in space of lines of projection from a 3-D object to a plane of projection, and secondary geometry, the relationships between the points, lines and shapes of the drawn projection on a 2-D surface.

Inspired on this distinction John Willats in his 1997 Art and Representation. New Principles in the Analysis of Pictures defined projection systems in terms of primary and secondary geometry. Pascal Lefèvre (2006) explained:

Primary geometry is viewer-centered and describes pictures in terms of projection rays: "The geometry of projection of lines or rays from objects in the scene and their intersection with the picture plane to form an image or picture." (Willats, 1997:369). Most technical drawings can be described by primary geometry, but other formal projection systems as the reversed perspective can not be described by primary geometry. In those cases an object-centered system is needed, like secondary geometry, which Willats (1997:369) like Booker (1963) defines as: "The two-dimensional geometry of the picture surface, obtained without recourse to the idea of projection."

== Selected publications ==
- Booker, Peter Jeffrey. Principles and Precedents in Engineering Design. Institute of Engineering Designers, 1962.
- Booker, Peter Jeffrey. A History of Engineering Drawing. 1963, 1979.
- Booker, P. J. Written Contribution for Engineering. (1964).
- Booker, Peter Jeffrey, and W. E. Walters. Three Dimensional Projection Drawing. Model & Allied Publications, 1968, 1985.

Articles, a selection:

- Booker, Peter J. "Gaspard Monge (1746–1818) and His Effect on Engineering Drawing and Technical Education". Transactions of the Newcomen Society 34.1 (1961): 15–36.
- Booker, P. J. "Written Contribution Appended to Conference on the Teaching of Engineering Design". Institute of Engineering Designers, London (1964): 3.
- Booker, Peter Jeffrey, Gerald C. Frewer, and Geoffrey Keith Charles Pardoe. "Project Apollo: The Way to the Moon". New York, New York (United States): Elsevier Scientific Publishing, 8+ 216 p. 1 (1969).

== Patents ==
- 1979. Patent US4166322 – Rulers for making axonometric projection drawings
