= Otto Böckler =

German journalist, writer and politician

- Occupation: Journalist, writer, politician

Otto Heinrich Böckler (23 June 1867 in Oranienburg – 16 June 1932 in Berlin) was a German politician and writer. He sat in the Reichstag for the German Reform Party from 1903 to 1907.

== Life and career ==
Böckler attended the seminary school in Oranienburg, the Kaiser-Wilhelm- und Ratsgymnasium in Hanover, and the Viktoria-Gymnasium in Potsdam, before he studied geography, history and other similar subjects at the Berlin and Magdeburg universities.

In 1891, he became an editor for the Staatsbürger-Zeitung in Berlin. From 1894 to 1896, he led the antisemitic movement in Pomerania. Later, he wrote several books and patriotic theatre works.

From 1903 to 1907, he represented Marienwerder's 7th constituency in the Reichstag of the German Empire for the German Reform Party.
