= Booker T =

Booker T or Booker T. may refer to

- Booker T. Washington (1856–1915), African American political leader at the turn of the 20th century
  - List of things named after Booker T. Washington, some nicknamed "Booker T."
- Booker T. Jones (born 1944), American musician and frontman of Booker T. and the M.G.'s
  - Booker T. & the M.G.'s, American band
- Booker T (wrestler) (Booker T. Huffman Jr., born 1965), American professional wrestler
- Booker T. Bradshaw (1940–2003), American record producer, film and TV actor, and executive
- Booker T. Laury (1914–1995), American boogie-woogie and blues pianist
- Booker T. Spicely (1909–1944) victim of a racist murder in North Carolina, United States
- Booker T. Whatley (1915–2005) agricultural professor at Tuskegee University
- Booker T. Washington White (1909–1977), American Delta blues guitarist and singer known as Bukka White
- Booker T. Boffin, pseudonym of Thomas Dolby on Def Leppard's album Pyromania
- "Booker T" (song), by Bad Bunny (2020)
