= Brie Bella =

American professional wrestler (born 1983)

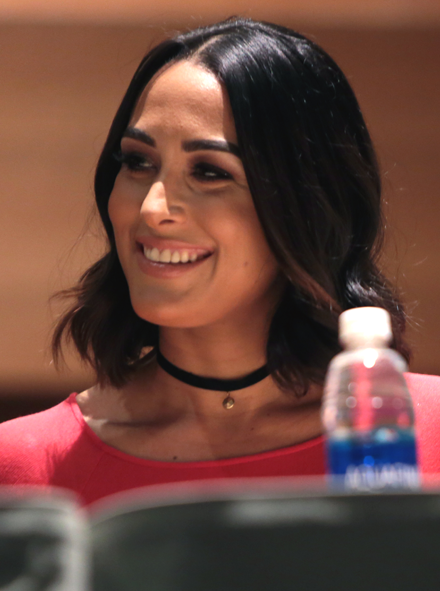
- Bella in 2016
- Born: Brianna Monique Garcia-Colace; November 21, 1983 (age 42); San Diego, California, U.S.
- Other name: Brie Garcia
- Occupations: Professional wrestler; TV personality
- Spouse: Bryan Danielson (m. 2014)
- Children: 2
- Relatives: Nikki Bella (twin sister)
- Professional wrestling career
- Ring names: Brianna Bella; Brie Bella; Brie Danielson
- Billed height: 5 ft 6 in (168 cm)
- Billed weight: 119 lb (54 kg)
- Billed from: Scottsdale, Arizona
- Trained by: Tom Prichard; Natalya Neidhart; WWE Performance Center
- Debut: September 15, 2007

Brianna Monique Danielson (née Garcia-Colace; born November 21, 1983), is an American professional wrestler and media personality. She is signed to WWE, where she performs under the ring name Brie Bella. She is one-half of The Bella Twins alongside her twin sister Nikki Bella. She has been inactive since August 2026 due to a shoulder injury.

In 2007, Garcia signed with WWE and was assigned to the developmental territory Florida Championship Wrestling alongside her twin sister Nikki, forming the duo The Bella Twins. She made her debut for the SmackDown brand in 2008. She is a one-time WWE Divas Champion, a one-time WWE Women's Tag Team Champion (with Paige), and she and Nikki were inducted into the WWE Hall of Fame in 2021 as The Bella Twins. During her time in WWE, she also starred in the reality TV series, Total Divas, and she and Nikki got their own spin-off, Total Bellas.

In her last few years in WWE, she only made sporadic appearances, but acted as an ambassador for the company. After her contract with WWE expired in 2023, she and Nikki announced that they would be retiring the "Bella" surname and would be returning to their legal maiden name of "Garcia" professionally, and reintroduced themselves as The Garcia Twins. Brie reverted to the Bella name in 2026 upon returning to WWE at that year's Royal Rumble event.

== Early life ==
Brianna Monique Garcia-Colace was born in San Diego, California, and raised on a farm in Phoenix, Arizona. She was born sixteen minutes after her twin sister, Nicole, to parents Jon Garcia and Kathy Colace. She is of Mexican and Italian descent. Keen soccer enthusiasts, she along with her sister played for the Scottsdale club in elementary school. She graduated from Chaparral High School in 2002. She then returned to San Diego for college, and relocated to Los Angeles a year later, where she worked as a waitress at the Mondrian Hotel while trying to find an agent.

She then started modeling, acting, and doing promotional work. She made her first national TV appearance on the Fox reality show Meet My Folks. Following this appearance, the Garcia twins were hired to be the World Cup Twins for Budweiser and were photographed holding the World Cup trophy. Brie and her sister Nikki were contestants in the 2006 "International Body Doubles twins search". Brie and Nikki later participated in the 2006 WWE Diva Search, but they did not make the cut.

== Professional wrestling career ==
=== World Wrestling Entertainment/WWE (2007-2012) ===
==== Florida Championship Wrestling (2007–2008) ====
Brianna and Nicole were signed to developmental contracts by World Wrestling Entertainment (WWE) in June 2007 and were assigned to Florida Championship Wrestling (FCW), WWE's then-developmental territory, in Tampa, Florida. On September 15, 2007, the twins made their in-ring debut. Dubbed The Bella Twins, they defeated Nattie Neidhart and Krissy Vaine with Victoria Crawford as the special guest referee. The duo quickly started a scripted rivalry with Neidhart and Crawford, and had a series of matches against them throughout October 2007. As a part of their on-screen personas, they switched places behind the referee's back if one of them was hurt. They also occasionally competed in mixed tag team matches, teaming with male wrestlers including Kofi Kingston and Robert Anthony. They also made some non-wrestling appearances on Heath Miller's Happy Hour promo segment.

Starting in December 2007, they managed Derrick Linkin, but this storyline was cut short when Linkin was released in January 2008. They then resumed their feud with Neidhart and Crawford, wrestling them throughout much of 2008. After Neidhart was called up to the WWE roster in April 2008, Milena Roucka took her place in the feud. The twins also competed in bikini contests and wrestled against other competitors including Katie Lea Burchill and Daisy. Their last FCW appearance was on September 2, when they competed in a Divas battle royal won by Miss Angela.

==== The Bella Twins (2008–2011) ====
On the August 29, 2008 episode of SmackDown, Brianna debuted as Brie Bella and defeated Victoria. She quickly began a scripted rivalry with Victoria and Victoria's accomplice, Natalya, and had a series of matches against them. In each match, Brie would roll out of the ring and go underneath it, emerging and appearing revived, and then win the match. On the October 31 episode of SmackDown, when Brie went under the ring Victoria grabbed her legs, but a second pair of legs kicked her off, implying that a second person was under the ring. The following week on SmackDown, Brie picked up a win against Victoria and then ran under the ring to escape Natalya and Victoria, but Victoria and Natalya both reached for Brie under the ring, resulting in both Nicole and Brie being pulled out. The twins then attacked them and celebrated afterward. Nicole was then introduced as Nikki Bella. The twins had their first official match as a team on the November 21 episode of SmackDown, defeating Victoria and Natalya. They continued competing in tag team matches over the following months.

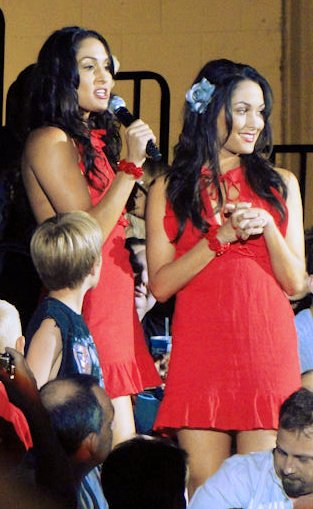
During their first tenure with WWE, both twins used to dressed in matching outfits as seen here

Starting in November, the twins developed an on-screen relationship with The Colóns (Carlito and Primo), appearing in numerous backstage segments with them, and accompanying them to the ring. In February 2009, the storyline expanded to include John Morrison and The Miz, who flirted with the Bellas and took them on a date for Valentine's Day. The date provoked a rivalry between the teams of The Miz and Morrison and Primo and Carlito, with the four competing for the affection of the twins, who were seemingly unable to choose between them. On March 17 on ECW, Carlito and Primo, aiming for Morrison and The Miz, accidentally spat apples in the face of Brie. Nikki began to laugh at Brie's misfortune, and a fight broke out between the two, which led to Nikki leaving with The Miz and Morrison, while Brie stayed with Primo and Carlito. Brie won her first match over Nikki in a six-person intergender tag team match on SmackDown the following week, but was defeated by her villainous sister in their first singles match against each other on the edition of March 31 of ECW, after a distraction from Morrison and The Miz.

On April 15, 2009, The Bella Twins were both drafted to the Raw brand as part of the 2009 supplemental draft. On April 27, Brie made her Raw in-ring debut in an eight-Diva tag team match, which her team won. Nikki also made an appearance, reuniting with her twin, as she was under the ring to help Brie during the match. Nikki then made her in-ring debut for the brand the following month in a battle royal but was eliminated by Beth Phoenix.

On June 29, 2009, they were both traded to the ECW brand. They returned to ECW the following night on The Abraham Washington Show, as the special guests. They quickly developed a storyline feud with Katie Lea Burchill, when Nikki defeated her in a match by switching places with Brie behind the referee's back. The following week on Superstars, Brie defeated Burchill after a similar fashion, and the feud ended in September, when Nikki defeated Burchill on Superstars.

On October 12, the Bellas were traded back to Raw as part of a tri-branded Divas trade, where they predominately appeared in backstage segments with the weekly guest stars and only occasionally competed in matches. On the January 4, 2010, episode of Raw, Brie participated in a tournament for the vacant Divas Championship, but lost to Maryse in the first round, when a switch resulted in Nikki being pinned. In June 2010, they developed a feud with Jillian Hall, when Brie defeated her after switching places with Nikki. The following week, Nikki defeated Hall after switching with Brie. The feud was exacerbated when the Bellas acted as the special guest referees during one of Hall's matches. During the match, Hall attacked both twins, but lost the match when Nikki made a fast count, allowing her to be pinned by Gail Kim. The next week on Superstars, the twins defeated Hall and Maryse in a tag team match to end the storyline.

On August 31, The Bella Twins announced they would be part of the all-female third season of NXT, mentoring Jamie. Jamie was the first rookie Diva eliminated on the October 5 episode of NXT. In November, the twins began a storyline with Daniel Bryan, when Brie accompanied him to the ring for his match. Following his win, Nikki ran out and the two fought over Bryan's affection, until Bryan broke it up and had them hug each other. They began to manage Bryan and frequently accompanied him to the ring over the next two months. In January 2011, both Bellas turned into villainous characters when they discovered Bryan kissing Gail Kim backstage and assaulted her. They continued to attack Kim, both at the Royal Rumble and on Raw, and on February 7, they teamed with Melina in a losing effort to Kim, Eve Torres, and Tamina.

==== Divas Champion (2011–2012) ====
The Bellas began feuding with Eve Torres after they appeared as lumberjills during a Divas Championship match between Torres and Natalya on the February 14 episode of Raw. Following the match, they attacked Torres backstage before Gail Kim and Natalya stopped them. The next week, the twins defeated Torres and Kim in a tag team match. The following week, Nikki won a battle royal to become the number one contender for the Divas Championship, and unsuccessfully challenged Torres for the championship on March 7.

On April 11, Brie defeated Torres to win the Divas Championship, marking the first time either twin had held a championship in WWE. She also became the first twin to win a singles championship in the WWE. Brie went on to successfully defend the championship against Kelly Kelly at Over the Limit, after switching places with Nikki. On a special "Power to the People" episode of Raw on June 20, Brie defended her WWE Divas Championship against Kelly, who was selected by voters. Kelly then defeated Brie and won the championship. On July 17, Brie challenged Kelly for the championship in a rematch at Money in the Bank, but failed to win.

The twins spent the majority of the rest of the year in tag team matches, regularly facing Kelly and Torres. The Bellas began to show friction for the second time since joining WWE in March 2012, after both twins lost to AJ Lee in singles competition. After Brie's match with Lee, Nikki revealed that Brie was rooting for Team Johnny in the 12-man tag team match at WrestleMania XXVIII, whilst Nikki was rooting for Team Teddy, thus furthering their dissension.

On the April 6 episode of SmackDown, Nikki defeated the Divas Champion Beth Phoenix in a non-title match, after Kelly Kelly distracted Phoenix. On April 23, Nikki defeated Phoenix in a lumberjill match on Raw to win the Divas Championship for the first time. Brie lost Nikki's championship to Layla at Extreme Rules after Twin Magic failed, ending her Divas Championship reign after only a week. The following night on Raw, they competed in their last match with the WWE, failing to win back the Divas Championship from Layla in a triple threat match. Later that night, WWE announced on their website that the twins had been fired by Executive Administrator Eve Torres.

=== Independent circuit promotions (2012–2013) ===
On May 1, 2012, the twins appeared at their first independent wrestling show in Newburgh, New York at Northeast Wrestling. They later appeared for CTWE Pro Wrestling at the Season Beatings pay-per-view on December 15, each accompanying a different wrestler to the ring.

=== Return to WWE (2013-2023) ===
==== Total Divas storylines (2013–2014) ====
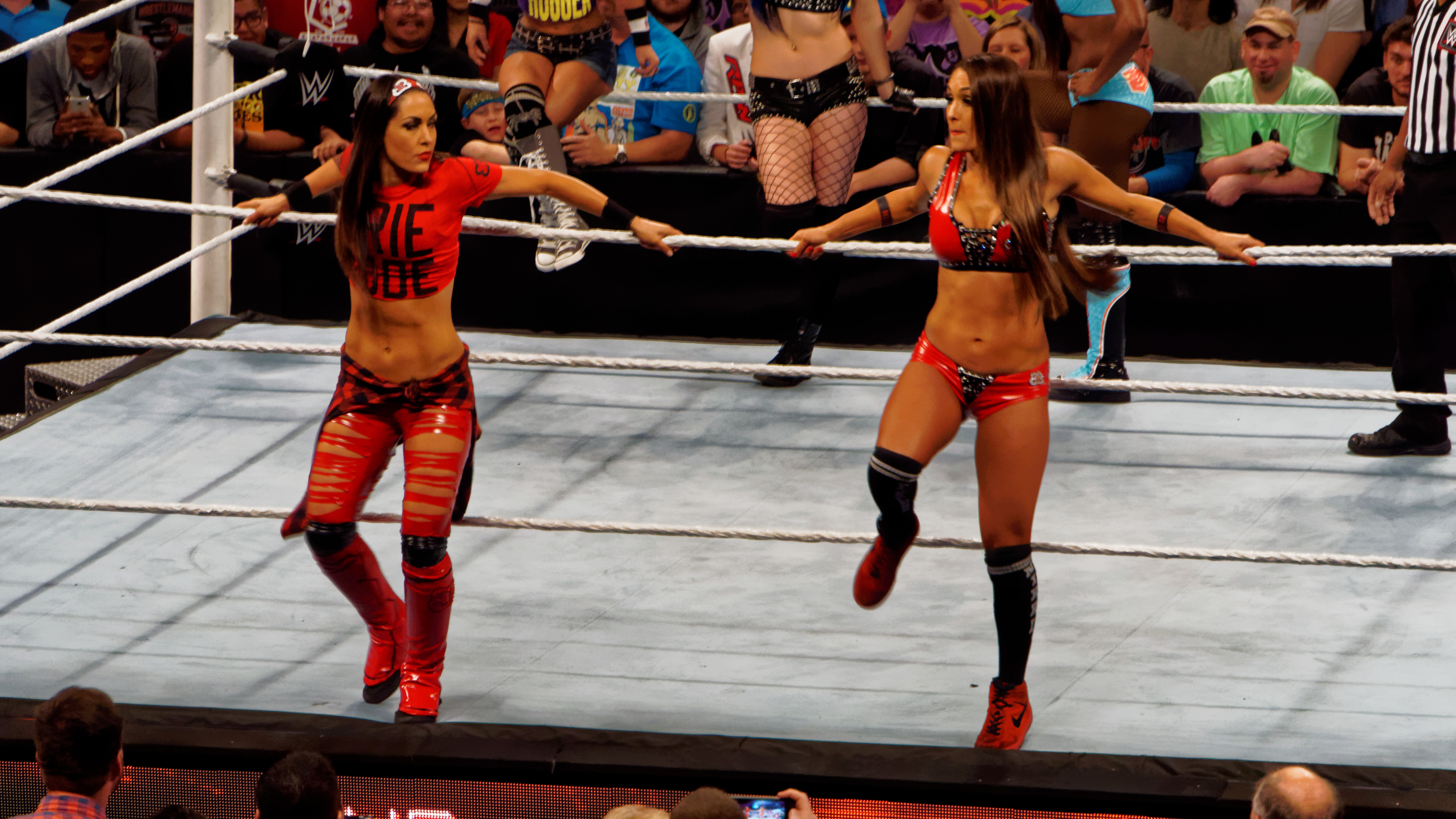
After returning to WWE, the twins began dressing in different outfits, as seen here

The Bella Twins returned to WWE on the March 11, 2013, episode of Raw in a backstage segment with Team Rhodes Scholars (Cody Rhodes and Damien Sandow). On the March 15 episode of SmackDown, the twins attacked The Funkadactyls (Cameron and Naomi), and the following week interfered in matches between Team Rhodes Scholars and Brodus Clay and Tensai, but were attacked by The Funkadactyls. The twins made their in-ring return facing and defeating The Funkadactyls on the March 27 episode of Main Event after interference from Cody Rhodes, and also defeated them on Raw five days later. The Bella Twins were scheduled to participate in an eight–person tag team match with Team Rhodes Scholars against Tons of Funk (Clay and Tensai) and The Funkadactyls at WrestleMania 29, but the match was cancelled due to time restraints, and instead took place the following night on Raw, where The Bella Twins and Team Rhodes Scollars were defeated. The twins continued their feud with The Funkadactyls throughout April, defeating them in standard tag team, and six-Diva tag team matches. In June, Nikki suffered a fractured tibia.

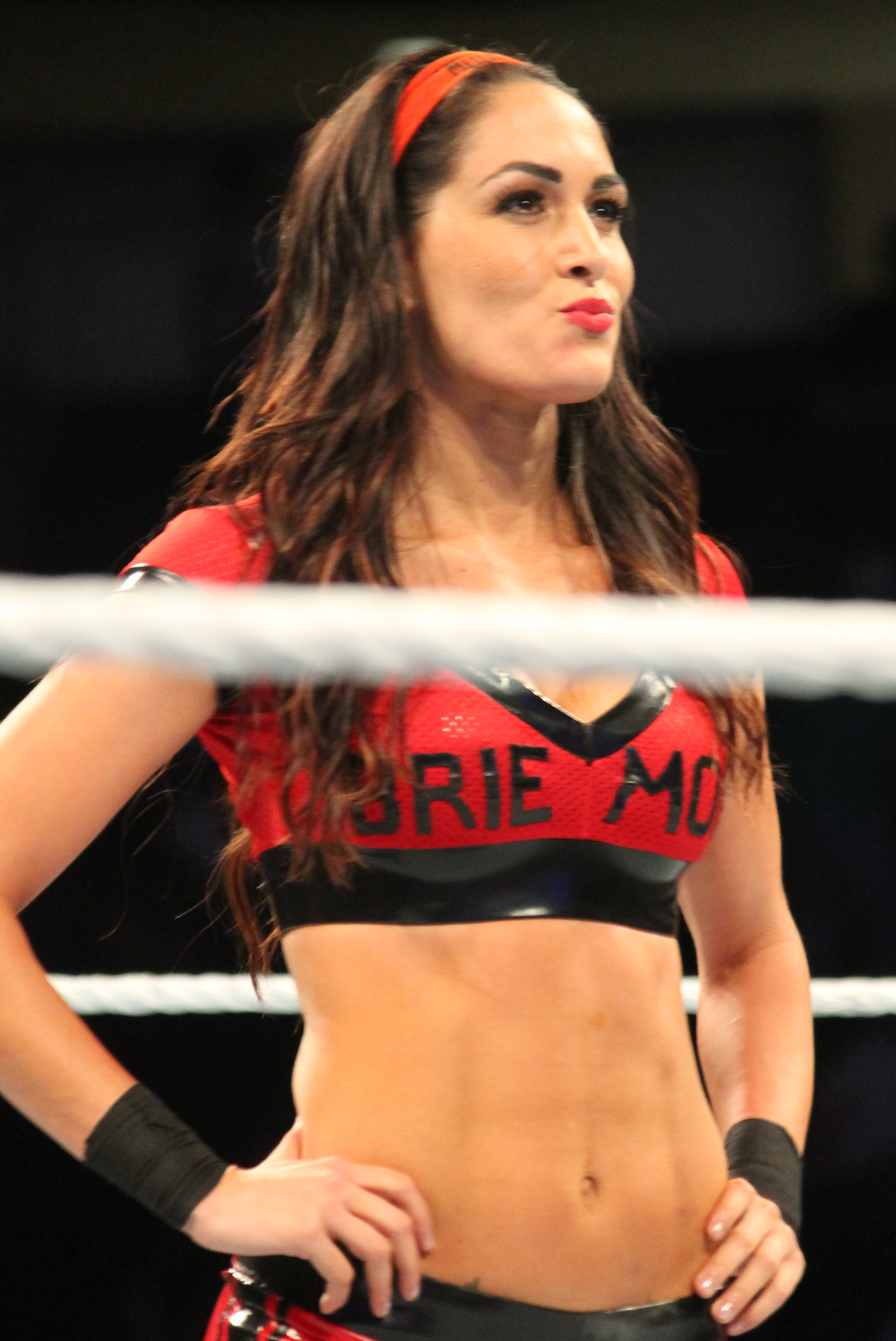
Bella in 2014

Upon the debut of the Total Divas reality television program in July, The Bellas began feud with their co–star on the show, Natalya. Brie and Natalya went on to trade victories in singles competition on Raw and at SummerSlam. The cast of Total Divas then transitioned into a scripted feud with Divas Champion AJ Lee, who mocked the show and cast, turning The Bellas faces in the process. At Night of Champions, Brie unsuccessfully challenged Lee for the Divas Championship in a four-way match, which also involved Natalya and Naomi. Following Brie's real-life engagement to Daniel Bryan, their relationship began to be acknowledged on WWE television. Continuing their feud into October, Brie and AJ Lee faced off at the Battleground and Hell in a Cell pay-per-views for the Divas Championship, but Brie was unsuccessful. Nikki returned to in-ring action on the October 25 episode of SmackDown, losing to Lee. At Survivor Series the following month, the twins were part of the victorious Team Total Divas. The twins failed to win the Divas Championship again at WrestleMania XXX in the Divas Invitational match, which was won by AJ Lee.

In April 2014, Brie became involved in her real-life husband Daniel Bryan's ongoing storyline with Stephanie McMahon and Kane, where as part of the storyline, McMahon threatened to fire Brie if an injured Bryan did not relinquish the WWE World Heavyweight Championship at Payback, which forced Brie to "quit" WWE before slapping McMahon in the face. After Brie quit, McMahon put Nikki in several handicap matches as punishment. After a month absence, Brie returned to WWE television, appearing in the crowd on July 21; following a confrontation, McMahon slapped Brie and was subsequently arrested. In order to have Brie drop the "charges", Brie was rehired and received a match against McMahon at SummerSlam.

At the pay-per-view, Nikki turned heel by attacking Brie, which allowed McMahon to win the match. The next several weeks saw the twins fight in several backstage and in-ring segments, including a cameo appearance from Jerry Springer on Raw on September 8. As part of the storyline, McMahon declared Nikki the face of the WWE Divas division and granted her a match at Night of Champions for the Divas Championship, which she failed to win. Nikki then obtained permission to begin forcing Brie to compete in handicap matches, similar to her punishment at the hands of McMahon, although Brie was able to win them. This led to a match between the twins at Hell in a Cell, where the loser was forced to become the winner's personal assistant for 30 days, in which Nikki defeated Brie. Five days later on SmackDown, Nikki won a Halloween costume battle royal to become the number one contender for the Divas Championship.

==== Team Bella (2014–2016) ====
Nikki received her title match against AJ Lee on November 23 at Survivor Series, which she won, with Brie's help, to become a two-time Divas Champion. The duo had reconciled at this point, with Brie also turning heel in the process. Nikki then went on to retain her championship in three separate occasions – against Lee in a rematch on December 14, at TLC: Tables, Ladders and Chairs, against Naomi two days later on SmackDown, and against Paige at Fastlane on February 22, 2015. Paige and AJ then formed an alliance against the Bellas which led to a tag team match at WrestleMania 31, where AJ and Paige were victorious.

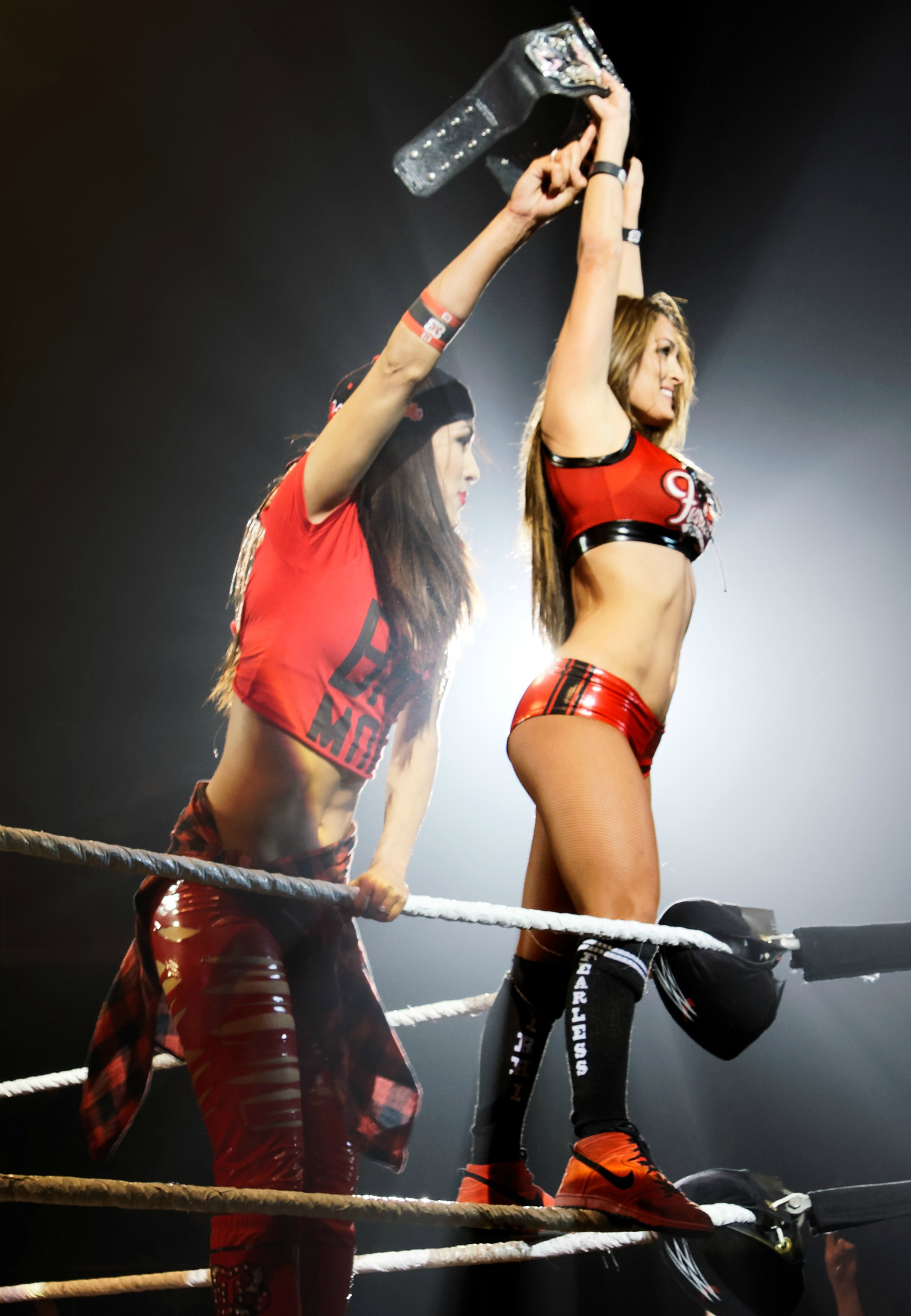
Brie (left) posing with Nikki (right) with the Divas Championship in 2015

On April 26, after Nikki, with the help of Brie, once again retained her title against Naomi at Extreme Rules a feud started, with Naomi aligning with the returning Tamina to even the odds against the Bellas, who began showing more heroic characteristics, This change in character was criticized as "sudden", "randomly" and "for no reason". This led to a tag team match between the two teams on May 17, at Payback, which Naomi and Tamina won. Two weeks later, at Elimination Chamber, Nikki retained her title against Naomi and Paige in a triple threat match, with Brie banned from ringside.

In June, The Bella Twins became villains once again by employing Twin Magic, which helped Nikki retain the title against Paige on the June 1 episode of Raw and at Money in the Bank. During the feud with Paige, Alicia Fox allied with them to form Team Bella. At The Beast in the East on July 4, Nikki retained the title against Paige and Tamina. After weeks of Team Bella outnumbering Paige, Naomi, and Tamina, Stephanie McMahon called for a "revolution" in the WWE Divas division and introduced the debuting Charlotte and Becky Lynch as Paige's allies, while NXT Women's Champion Sasha Banks debuted as an ally to Naomi and Tamina, which led to a brawl between the three teams. Nikki then lost to Charlotte in a tag team match on the August 3 episode of Raw, and to Banks on the August 17 episode of Raw in a non-title match. The three teams faced off on August 23 at SummerSlam in a three team elimination match, in which Team Bella first eliminated Team B.A.D., before Team PCB's win.

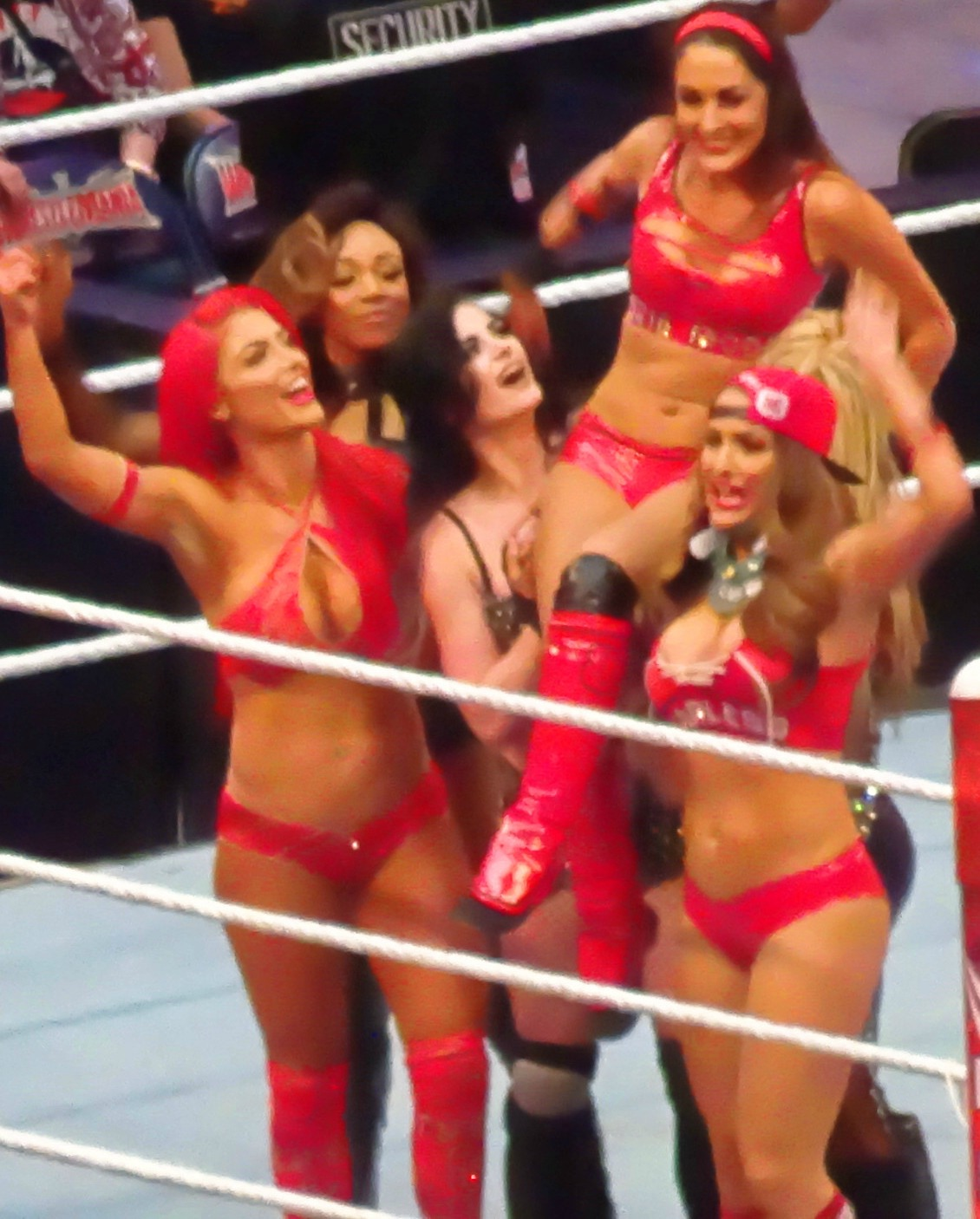
Brie celebrating her victory alongside her sister Nikki and fellow Total Divas co-stars on the WrestleMania 32 kickoff show in April 2016

On the September 14 episode of Raw, Nikki defended her title against Charlotte, who pinned Brie after the twins had switched places to win the match; however, since the title cannot change hands by disqualification, Nikki retained the championship, and in the process, became the new longest reigning Divas Champion in history, surpassing AJ Lee's previous record of 295 days. Nikki dropped the championship to Charlotte, on September 20, at Night of Champions, ending her reign at 301 days, and failed to regain the title in a rematch on October 25 at Hell in a Cell.

Shortly after, Nikki went on a hiatus from television due to a neck injury which would require surgery, but returned for one night on December 21, to accept the Slammy Award for Diva of the Year. During this time, Brie continued to compete in singles competition, and in tag team matches with Fox. After defeating Charlotte in a non-title match on the February 1 episode of Raw, Brie was granted a match for the Divas Championship at Fastlane on February 21, where she failed to capture the title. During that time, Team Bella quietly disbanded and both Brie and Fox transitioned into fan favorites.

In March, Brie was placed in a feud with Lana, who argued that Brie's fans only supported her out of pity for having a "bad husband", and went on to distract and attacked her during and after her matches. Brie then aligned herself with fellow Total Divas cast members Alicia Fox, Natalya, Paige and Eva Marie, while Lana aligned herself with Team B.A.D. (Naomi and Tamina), Summer Rae and Emma, leading to a 10-Diva tag team match on the WrestleMania 32 kickoff show, which Team Total Divas would win after Naomi submitted to Brie. Three days later on April 6, Brie confirmed that she would be taking an extended break from in-ring competition, citing family reasons, while also stating that she would continue working for WWE as an ambassador.

==== Sporadic appearances (2018–2022) ====
The Bella Twins returned for the 25th anniversary of Raw on January 22, 2018. Brie later returned to in-ring competition at Royal Rumble, entering at number 28 in the inaugural women's Royal Rumble match, one number after her sister Nikki, who would eliminate her from the match minutes later.

At SummerSlam, The Miz defeated Daniel Bryan after an interference from Miz's wife Maryse. On the following SmackDown, Miz and Maryse came out, Miz then mocked Bryan's retirement speech two years earlier. Brie and Bryan came out and confronted them. A mixed tag team match with Brie and Bryan against The Miz and Maryse was scheduled for Hell in a Cell. At the event, Brie and Bryan were defeated when Maryse pinned Brie.

At Super Show-Down on October 6, Brie teamed with sister Nikki and Ronda Rousey in defeating The Riott Squad. Two nights later on Raw, the Bellas and Rousey defeated The Riott Squad in a rematch, and afterwards, Brie joined Nikki in attacking Rousey, with Brie turning heel for the first time since November 2014. On October 28, Brie accompanied Nikki as she faced Rousey for the Raw Women's Championship in the main event of the all women's pay–per–view, WWE Evolution.

On the March 10, 2019 episode of Total Bellas, Brie announced that she was retired. On the February 21, 2020 edition of SmackDown, it was announced that Brie and her twin sister Nikki would be inducted into the WWE Hall of Fame, during A Moment of Bliss segment. On the January 7, 2022 episode of SmackDown, it was announced that Brie and Nikki would be competing in the 2022 Women's Royal Rumble match. At the event, she entered the Women's Royal Rumble match at #19 but was eliminated by Ronda Rousey.

On March 14, 2023, on their podcast The Nikki & Brie Show, Brie and Nikki announced that their contracts with WWE had expired, and it was mutually agreed to not renew their contracts, as the twins wanted to start a new chapter in their lives. They subsequently reintroduced themselves as The Garcia Twins as "Garcia" was their maiden name.

=== All Elite Wrestling (2023–2024) ===
On March 5, 2023, the twins were in attendance backstage at All Elite Wrestling (AEW) event Revolution to support Brie's husband Bryan Danielson. Brie (now called "Brie Danielson") appeared at AEW All In, in support of Bryan's AEW World Championship match against Swerve Strickland and celebrated his victory.

=== Second return to WWE (2026–present) ===
At the 2026 Royal Rumble on January 31, 2026, Brie made her return to WWE, entering the Women's Royal Rumble match at #29, but was eliminated by Lash Legend. At WrestleMania 42 on April 18, Brie teamed with a returning Paige, who filled in for an injured Nikki, to win the WWE Women's Tag Team Championship for the first time. At Saturday Night's Main Event XLIV on May 23, Brie and Paige retained the titles against The Irresistible Forces (Legend and Nia Jax). On July 18, 2026, on Saturday Night's Main Event XLV, Bella and Paige lost the WWE Women's Tag Team Championship to Fatal Influence, ending their reign at 91 days. At Summerslam, the Bellas and Paige lost to Fatal Influence, after which the Bellas turned on Paige and turned heel for the first time since 2018. Brie also suffered a shoulder injury during the match, and she later revealed on Instagram that she had broken her scapula. This marked the first time in her career Brie has been injured.

== Other media ==
Brie Garcia

YouTube information
- Channel: Nikki And Brie
- Years active: 2016-present
- Genre: Vlog
- Subscribers: 3.42 million
- Views: 164.5 million
- Last updated: August 26, 2026

Prior to working with WWE, the twins appeared on Meet My Folks. Both twins also appeared in the music video for "Right Side of the Bed" by the band Atreyu. They also appeared in the music video for "Na Na" by Trey Songz in 2014. The twins made a guest appearance on the MTV series Ridiculousness in October 2012.

The twins guest starred on the television series Psych, in the 2014 episode "A Nightmare on State Street". Nikki and Brie were a part of the main cast for the reality television show Total Divas, which began airing in July 2013, and they also starred in their own spinoff entitled Total Bellas, which premiered on E! on October 5, 2016. Nikki and Brie co-starred in the 2014 independent film Confessions of a Womanizer, and provided voices for the 2015 movie The Flintstones & WWE: Stone Age SmackDown!. Both twins appeared on the WWE YouTube show The JBL & Cole Show. Nikki appeared at the Miss USA 2013 pageant as one of the celebrity judges. They appeared at the 2014 MTV Europe Music Awards, where they presented the award for Best Female. The twins were both nominated for Choice Female Athlete at the 2015 Teen Choice Awards. Brie appeared alongside Paige, Natalya and the Chrisley family on the 88th Academy Awards edition of E! Countdown to the Red Carpet in February 2016. In 2016, Brie and Nikki were voted as Choice Female Athletes for the 2016 Teen Choice Awards.

On November 21, 2016, Brie and Nikki unveiled their new YouTube channel, "The Bella Twins". The sisters' channel features daily fashion, beauty, travel, fitness, relationship, and health videos, along with daily video blogs, created by the twins themselves. The channel surpassed 3.5 million subscribers before its closure in 2023 following their departure from WWE.

The Bella Twins appeared in YouTuber iiSuperwomanii's video "When Someone Tries to Steal Your BFF" on March 2, 2017.

On August 21, 2017, Brie and Nikki launched their own wine label called Belle Radici in collaboration with Hill Family Estates and Gauge Branding.

On November 1, 2017, Brie and Nikki launched Birdiebee, a lifestyle intimates and activewear brand. The line includes transitional intimates, activewear, and loungewear aimed at "empowering and educating women through mirroring the twins' passion for life, strength, women's health and wellness, and fun."

On January 28, 2019, Brie and Nikki launched Nicole + Brizee, a body and beauty line.

On March 27, 2019, Brie and Nikki launched The Bellas Podcast with the Endeavor Audio Network. In October 2021, it was announced that the podcast had been acquired by Stitcher. In March 2023, the podcast was renamed The Nikki & Brie Show following their departure from WWE.

In March 2020, Brie and Nikki released their memoir Incomparable.

In 2021, Brie and Nikki launched another wine label called Bonita Bonita Wine.

In 2021, Brie and Nikki launched their own baby gear collection in partnership with Colugo. Brie and Nikki also announced that they joined Colugo as investors and are now creative advisors.

On March 2, 2023, Amazon Studios and ITV Entertainment announced that Brie and Nikki would co-host a brand new dating competition show, Twin Love, which would premiere that summer.

The Bella Twins have appeared in twelve WWE video games. They made their in-game debut at WWE SmackDown vs. Raw 2010 and appeared in WWE SmackDown vs. Raw 2011, WWE '12 (DLC), WWE '13, WWE 2K14 (DLC), WWE 2K15, WWE 2K16, WWE 2K17, WWE 2K18, WWE 2K19, WWE 2K20, WWE 2K Battlegrounds, WWE 2K23 and WWE 2K26 (DLC).

== Personal life ==
In an interview with Hollywood Live, Brie revealed to have been in a relationship with Edward "Bear" Coover in high school until 2002, when he was killed by a drunk driver. She has a tattoo of bear claws as a tribute to him.

In September 2013, she revealed her engagement to fellow professional wrestler Bryan Danielson. The couple married on April 11, 2014. Brie and her husband are both vegetarians. The couple have two children together. They have publicly discussed their vegetarian or vegan lifestyle as late as 2019.

Brie and her sister Nikki are supporters of the NFL's Philadelphia Eagles.

== Bibliography ==
- Incomparable (with Nikki Bella) (Gallery Books, 2021, Hardcover) ISBN 1-50119-192-6, ISBN 978-1501191923

== Filmography ==
Film
Year	Film	Role	Notes
2005	Wedding Crashers	Wedding Guest; uncredited; extra	Romantic comedy film directed by David Dobkin.
2014	Confessions of a Womanizer	Sally	Comedy-drama film directed and written by Miguel Ali.
2015	The Flintstones & WWE: Stone Age SmackDown!	Brie Boulder; voice performance	Direct-to-video animated film directed by Spike Brandt and Tony Cervone.
Television
Year	Title	Role	Notes
2002/2003	Meet My Folks	Herself	
2011	Clash Time	Herself	Episodes: "Turin" (season 1, episode 9)
2012	Ridiculousness	Herself	Episode: "The Bella Twins" (season 2, episode 16)
2012	Clash Time	Herself	Episode: "Mania Mania" (season 2, episode 3)
2013–2019	Total Divas	Herself	Main cast (seasons 1–8); Guest (season 9)
2014	Psych	Herself	Episode: "A Nightmare on State Street" (season 8, episode 9)
2016	E! Countdown to the Red Carpet	Herself	88th Academy Awards; 68th Primetime Emmy Awards
2016–2021	Total Bellas	Herself	Main cast (seasons 1–6); Executive producer
2018	Drop the Mic	Herself	Episode: "WWE Superstars vs. GLOW / Laila Ali vs. Chris Jericho" (season 2, episode 9)
2018	Miz & Mrs.	Herself	Episode: "A Simple Mizunderstanding"
2020	The Substitute	Herself	Episode 1.5
2020	Fight Like a Girl	Herself	Episode: “The Bella Twins and Carly / Brie Bella and Shavonne”
2020	Celebrity Call Center	Herself	Episode: "The Shift With the Baby on Board Bedroom How-To" (season 1, episode 3)
2021	The Bachelorette	Herself	(season 18, episode 4)
2022	The Real Dirty Dancing	Herself	Contestant (4th place)
2022	Oh Hell No! with Marlon Wayans	Herself	
2023	Barmageddon	Herself	Episode 5: "Brie Bella vs. Sasha Banks"
2023	Nikki Bella Says I Do	Herself	
2023	Twin Love	Co-host	
2024	AEW: Close Up with Renee Paquette	Herself	25 August

=== Music videos ===
Year	Title	Artist
2004	Right Side of the Bed	Atreyu
2008	Everything Good	Richie Kotzen
2014	Na Na	Trey Songz
2017	Hollywood	Sophia Grace

== Championships and accomplishments ==
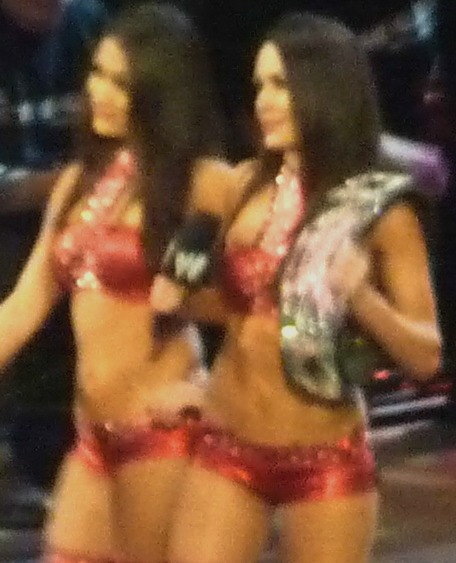
Brie (right) is a one-time WWE Divas Champion.

- Pro Wrestling Illustrated
  - Ranked No. 12 of the top 50 female wrestlers in the PWI Female 50 in 2015
- Teen Choice Awards
  - Choice Female Athlete (2016) – with Nikki Bella
- Wrestling Observer Newsletter
  - Worst Feud of the Year (2014) Brie vs. Nikki
  - Worst Feud of the Year (2015) Team PCB vs. Team B.A.D. vs. Team Bella
  - Worst Worked Match of the Year (2013) 14-woman elimination tag team match at Survivor Series on November 24
- WWE
  - WWE Women's Tag Team Championship (1 time) – with Paige
  - WWE Divas Championship (1 time)
  - WWE Hall of Fame (Class of 2020) – as a member of The Bella Twins
  - Slammy Award (3 times)
    - Couple of the Year (2013, 2014) – with Daniel Bryan
    - Diva of the Year (2013) – award shared with Nikki Bella
