= Twin Love =

American reality television series

- Genre: Dating show
- Presented by: Brie Garcia; Nikki Garcia
- Country of origin: United States
- Original language: English
- No. of seasons: 1
- No. of episodes: 9

Production
- Executive producers: Jessica Nahmias; Kenny Rosen; Bernie Schaeffer; Simon Thomas
- Cinematography: Dawn Fleischman
- Production companies: Amazon Studios; ITV Entertainment

Original release
- Network: Amazon Prime Video; Amazon Freevee
- Release: November 17, 2023

Twin Love is an American dating competition reality television series hosted by twins Brie Garcia and Nikki Garcia. It premiered on Amazon Prime Video and Amazon Freevee on November 17, 2023.

== Summary ==
Ten sets of twins split up and placed into two houses to test if each pursues the same love interest as their twin.

== Cast ==
- Brie Garcia
- Nikki Garcia
- Brittnay and Whittnay James
- Sabella and Hanna Radostitz
- Cameron and Ceara McKegney
- Zoie and Baelee Bogart
- Morgan and Madison Ramsey
- Seth and Luke Banks
- Jair and Micquel Bernier
- Matthew and Andrew Beatty
- Samir and Samer Akel
- David and Aaron Cabello
- Akash and Krish Chandani
- Maddie and Gaby Capozza
- Morgaine and Rhiannon Smith
- Shelby and Ally Baker

== Production ==
The series is executive produced by Simon Thomas, Bernie Schaeffer, Kenny Rosen, and Jessica Nahmias. On March 2, 2023, former WWE professional wrestlers Brie Garcia and Nikki Garcia were introduced as the hosts. The Garcia twins previously starred in Total Bellas, a reality show that detailed their daily lives, from 2016 through 2021.

== Release ==
The official trailer was released on October 25, 2023. All 9 episodes of the series premiered on Prime Video and Freevee on November 17, 2023.
