= Nikki Bella =

American professional wrestler (born 1983)

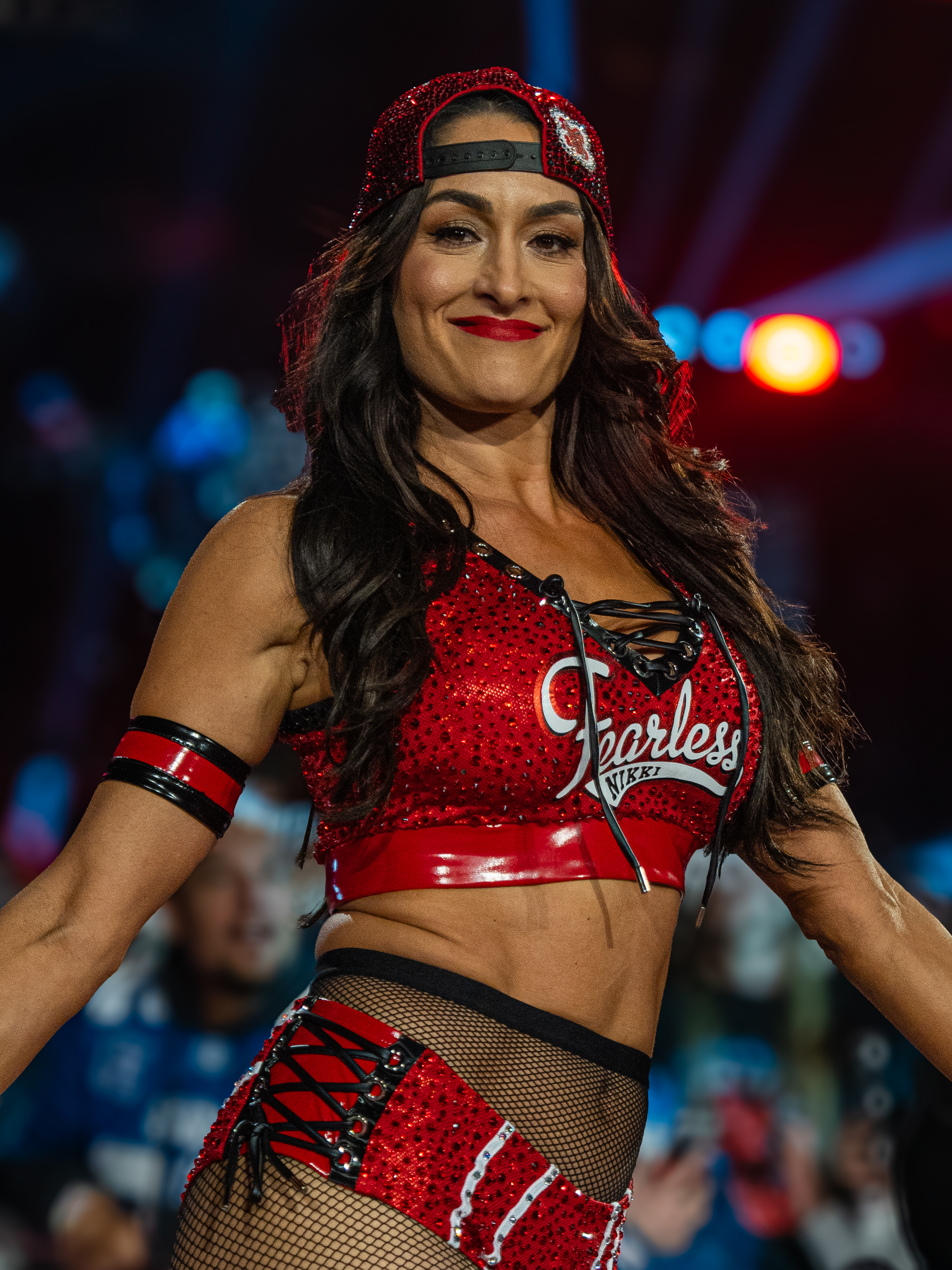
- Bella in 2025
- Born: Stephanie Nicole Garcia-Colace; November 21, 1983 (age 42); San Diego, California, U.S.
- Other name: Nikki Garcia
- Education: Grossmont College
- Occupations: Professional wrestler; TV personality
- Spouse: Artem Chigvintsev (m. 2022; div. 2024)
- Partner: John Cena (2012–2018)
- Children: 1
- Relatives: Brie Garcia (twin sister); Bryan Danielson (brother-in-law)
- Professional wrestling career
- Ring names: Nicole Bella; Nikki Bella; Nikki Garcia
- Billed height: 5 ft 6 in (168 cm)
- Billed weight: 125 lb (57 kg)
- Billed from: San Diego, California
- Trained by: Tom Prichard; Natalya Neidhart; WWE Performance Center
- Debut: September 15, 2007

Stephanie Nicole Garcia-Colace (born November 21, 1983), also known by the stage names Nikki Bella and Nikki Garcia, is an American professional wrestler and television personality. She is signed to WWE.

In 2007, Garcia signed with WWE and was assigned to the developmental territory Florida Championship Wrestling alongside her twin sister Brianna, who went by Brie, forming the duo The Bella Twins. She made her debut for the SmackDown brand in 2008. She is a two-time WWE Divas Champion with her second reign of 301 days being the longest reign for the now defunct title. She and Brie were inducted into the WWE Hall of Fame in 2021 as The Bella Twins. Also during her time in WWE, she starred in the reality TV series, Total Divas, and she and Brie got their own spin-off, Total Bellas. In her last few years in WWE, she only made sporadic appearances, but acted as an ambassador for the company. After her contract with WWE expired in 2023, Nikki and Brie retired the "Bella" surname and returned to their legal maiden name of "Garcia" professionally, reintroducing themselves as The Garcia Twins. Nikki reverted to the Bella name in 2025 upon returning to WWE at that year's Royal Rumble event.

Garcia ranked No. 1 in Pro Wrestling Illustrated's Female 50 in November 2015, and was named Diva of the Year by Rolling Stone in December 2015. She also won the award for Choice Female Athlete alongside her sister at the Teen Choice Awards in 2016.

== Early life ==
Born sixteen minutes before her twin sister, Brianna, to parents Jon Garcia and Kathy Colace, Garcia-Colace was born in San Diego, California, and raised on a farm in Phoenix, Arizona. She is also a native of Scottsdale, Arizona. She is of Italian and Mexican descent. Keen soccer enthusiasts, she along with her twin sister played for the Scottsdale club in elementary school. She graduated from Chaparral High School in 2002. She then returned to San Diego for college where she played soccer for Grossmont College, but relocated to Los Angeles a year later, where she worked as a waitress at the Mondrian Hotel while trying to find an agent.

She made her first national TV appearance on the Fox reality show Meet My Folks. Following this appearance, the Garcia twins were hired to be the World Cup Twins for Budweiser and were photographed holding the World Cup trophy. They were contestants in the 2006 "International Body Doubles twins search" and later participated in the 2006 WWE Diva Search, but they did not make the cut.

== Professional wrestling career ==
=== World Wrestling Entertainment/WWE (2007–2012) ===
==== Florida Championship Wrestling (2007–2008) ====
Nicole was signed to a developmental contract with her sister by World Wrestling Entertainment (WWE) in June 2007 and was assigned to Florida Championship Wrestling (FCW), WWE's then-developmental territory, in Tampa, Florida. At a FCW house show on September 15, 2007, Nicole and her twin Brie, called The Bella Twins, made their in-ring debut by defeating Nattie Neidhart and Krissy Vaine with Victoria Crawford as the special guest referee. She quickly started a scripted rivalry with Neidhart and Crawford, competing in a series of matches against them throughout October 2007. As a part of their on-screen personas, she and Brie would switch places behind the referee's back if one of them was hurt. She also occasionally competed in mixed tag team matches, teaming with male wrestlers including Kofi Kingston and Robert Anthony. She also made some non-wrestling appearances on Heath Miller's Happy Hour promo segment.

Starting in December 2007, she managed Derrick Linkin, however, the storyline was cut short when Linkin was released in January 2008. She and Brie then resumed their feud with Neidhart and Crawford, wrestling them throughout much of 2008. After Neidhart was called up to the WWE roster in April 2008, Milena Roucka took her place in the feud. Nikki also competed in bikini contests, and wrestled against other competitors including Katie Lea Burchill and Daisy. Nikki's last FCW appearance was on September 2, when she competed in a Divas battle royal won by Miss Angela.

==== The Bella Twins (2008–2011) ====
On the August 29, 2008, episode of SmackDown, Brianna debuted as Brie Bella, defeating Victoria. She quickly began a scripted rivalry with Victoria and Victoria's accomplice, Natalya, and had a series of matches against them. In each match, Brie would roll out of the ring and go underneath it, emerging and appearing revived, and then win the match. On the October 31 episode of SmackDown, when Brie went under the ring, Victoria grabbed her legs, but a second pair of legs kicked her off, implying that a second person was under the ring. The following week on SmackDown, Brie defeated Victoria and then ran under the ring to escape Natalya and Victoria, but Victoria and Natalya both reached for Brie under the ring, resulting in both Nicole and Brie being pulled out. The twins then attacked them and celebrated afterward. Nicole was then introduced as Nikki Bella, and the twins had their first official match as a team on the November 21 episode of SmackDown, defeating Victoria and Natalya. They continued competing in tag team matches over the following months.

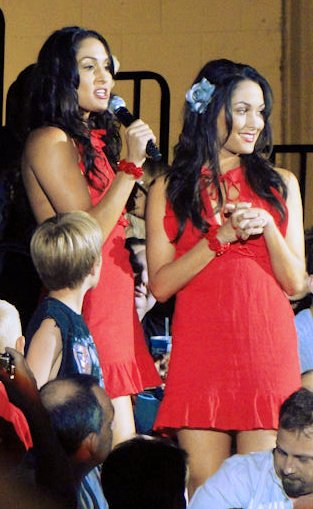
During their first tenure with WWE, both twins used to dressed in matching outfits as seen here

Starting in November, the twins developed an on-screen relationship with The Colóns (Carlito and Primo), appearing in numerous backstage segments with them, and accompanying them to the ring. In February 2009, the storyline expanded to include John Morrison and The Miz, who flirted with the Bellas and took them on a date for Valentine's Day. The date provoked a rivalry between the teams of The Miz and Morrison and Primo and Carlito, with the four competing for the affection of the twins, who were seemingly unable to choose between them. On the March 17 episode of ECW, Carlito and Primo, aiming for Morrison and The Miz, accidentally spat apples in the face of Brie. Nikki began to laugh at Brie's misfortune, and a fight broke out between the two, which led to Nikki leaving with The Miz and Morrison, while Brie stayed with Primo and Carlito, with Nikki turning heel in the process. Brie won her first match over Nikki in a six-person intergender tag team match on SmackDown the following week. On the March 31 episode of ECW, Nikki pinned Brie in their first singles match against each other after a distraction from Morrison and The Miz.

On April 15, 2009, The Bella Twins were both drafted to the Raw brand as part of the 2009 supplemental draft. On April 27, Brie made her Raw in-ring debut in an eight-Diva tag team match, which her team won. Nikki also made an appearance, reuniting with her twin as she was under the ring to help Brie during the match, turning face in the process. Nikki then made her in-ring debut for the brand the following month in a battle royal, but was eliminated by Beth Phoenix.

On June 29, 2009, they were both traded to the ECW brand. They debuted on ECW the following night as special guests on The Abraham Washington Show. They developed a storyline feud with Katie Lea Burchill, when Nikki defeated her in a match by switching places with Brie behind the referee's back. The following week on Superstars, Brie defeated Burchill in similar fashion, and the feud ended in September when Nikki defeated Burchill on Superstars.

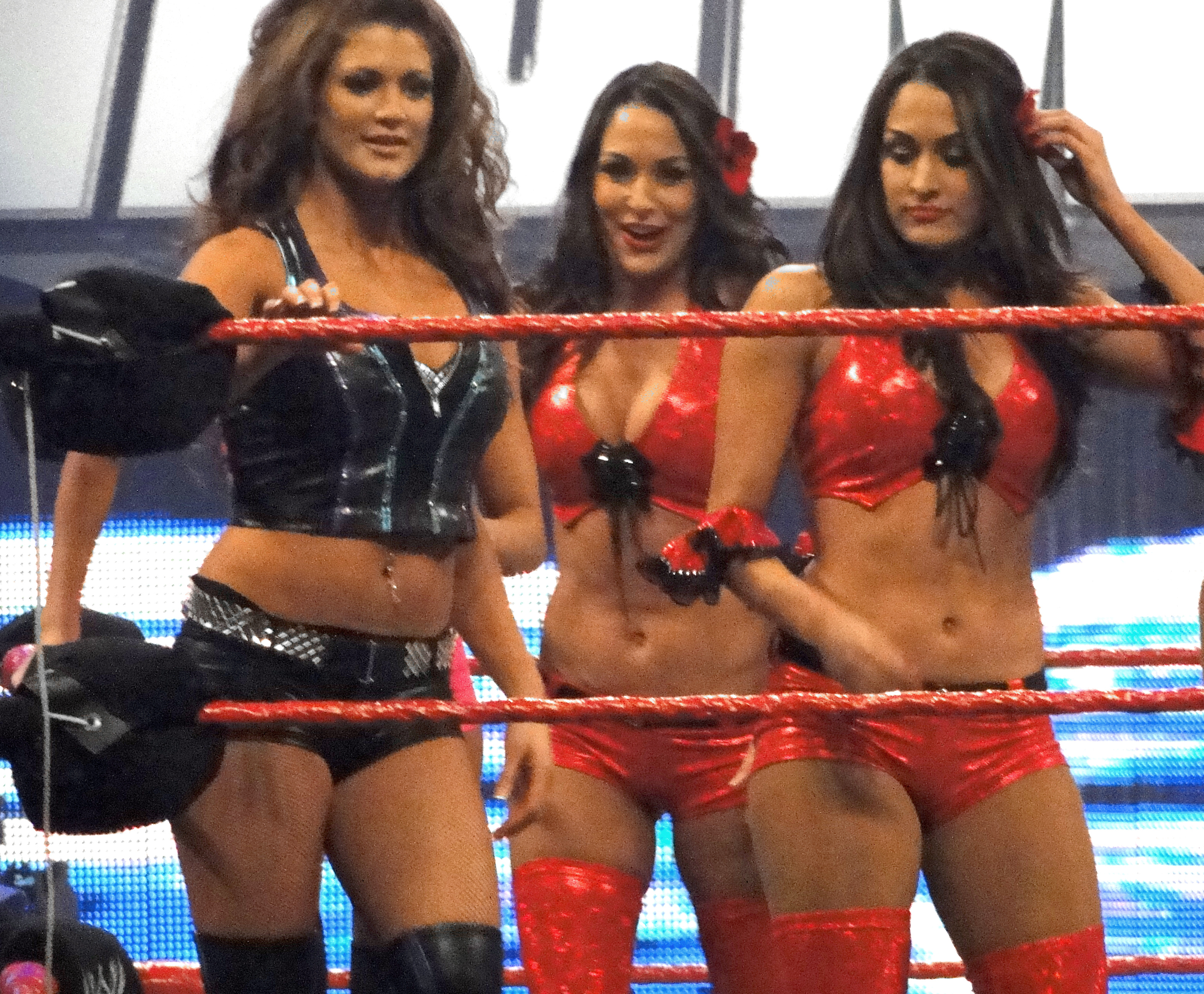
The Bella Twins with Eve Torres in 2010

On October 12, the Bellas were traded back to Raw as part of a tri-branded Divas trade, where they predominately appeared in backstage segments with the weekly guest stars and only occasionally competed in matches. On the January 4, 2010, episode of Raw, Brie participated in a tournament for the vacant WWE Divas Championship, but lost to Maryse in the first round, when a switch resulted in Nikki being pinned. In June 2010, they developed a feud with Jillian Hall, when Brie defeated her after switching places with Nikki. The following week, Nikki defeated Hall after switching with Brie. The feud was exacerbated when the Bellas acted as the special guest referees during one of Hall's matches. During the match, Hall attacked both twins, but lost the match when Nikki made a fast count, allowing her to be pinned by Gail Kim. The next week on Superstars, the twins defeated Hall and Maryse in a tag team match to end the storyline.

In 2010, the Bella Twins took part of the all-female third season of NXT, mentoring Jamie. Jamie was the first rookie Diva eliminated on the October 5 episode of NXT. In November, the twins began a storyline with Daniel Bryan, when Brie accompanied him to the ring for his match. Following his win, Nikki ran out and the two fought over Bryan's affection, until Bryan broke it up and had them hug each other. They began to manage Bryan and frequently accompanied him to the ring over the next two months. In January 2011, both Bellas turned into villainous characters for the first time in their careers, when they discovered Bryan kissing Gail Kim backstage and assaulted her. They continued to attack Kim, both at the Royal Rumble and on Raw, and on February 7, they teamed with Melina in a losing effort to Kim, Eve Torres, and Tamina.

==== Divas Champion and departure (2011–2012) ====
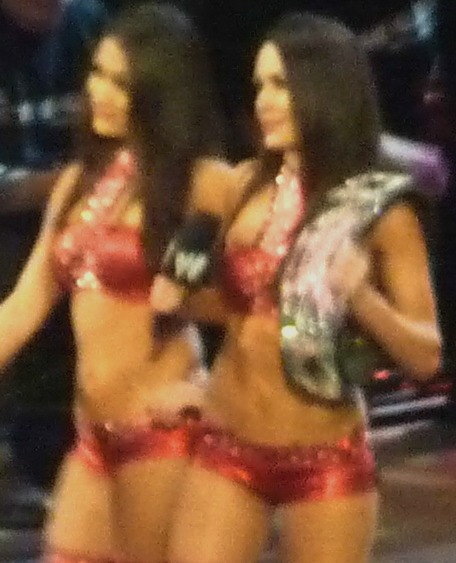
Brie Bella as Divas Champion (right) with Nikki Bella (left) in April 2011

The Bellas began feuding with Eve Torres after they appeared as lumberjills during a Divas Championship match between Torres and Natalya on the February 14 episode of Raw. Following the match, they attacked Torres backstage before Gail Kim and Natalya stopped them. The next week, the twins defeated Torres and Kim in a tag team match. The following week, Nikki won a battle royal to become the number one contender for the Divas Championship, and unsuccessfully challenged Torres for the championship on March 7. On April 11, Nikki helped Brie defeat Torres to win the Divas Championship, marking the first time either twin had held a championship in WWE. Nikki helped Brie once again, this time to successfully defend the championship against Kelly Kelly at Over the Limit, after switching places with Brie. However, Brie lost the championship against Kelly on a special "Power to the People" episode of Raw on June 20, ending her reign at 70 days, and failing to regain it on July 17, in a rematch against Kelly at Money in the Bank.

The twins spent the majority of the rest of the year in tag team matches, regularly facing Kelly and Torres. The Bellas began to show friction for the second time since joining WWE in March 2012, after both twins lost to AJ Lee in singles competition. After Brie's match with Lee, Nikki revealed that Brie was rooting for Team Johnny in the 12-man tag team match at WrestleMania XXVIII, whilst Nikki was rooting for Team Teddy, thus furthering their dissension.

On the April 6 episode of SmackDown, Nikki defeated then Divas Champion Beth Phoenix in a non-title match, after Kelly Kelly distracted Phoenix. On April 23, Nikki defeated Phoenix in a lumberjill match on Raw to win the Divas Championship for the first time. Brie lost Nikki's championship to Layla at Extreme Rules after Twin Magic failed, ending her Divas Championship reign after only a week. The following night on Raw, they competed in their last match with the WWE, failing to win back the Divas Championship from Layla in a triple threat match. Later that night, the twins were fired by Executive Administrator Eve Torres.

=== Independent circuit (2012–2013) ===
On May 1, 2012, the twins appeared at their first independent wrestling show in Newburgh, New York for the promotion Northeast Wrestling. They later appeared for CTWE Pro Wrestling at the Season Beatings pay-per-view on December 15, each accompanying a different wrestler to the ring.

=== Return to WWE (2013–2023) ===
==== Total Divas storylines (2013–2014) ====
On the March 11, 2013, episode of Raw, The Bella Twins returned to WWE in a backstage segment with Team Rhodes Scholars (Cody Rhodes and Damien Sandow). On the March 15 episode of SmackDown, they attacked The Funkadactyls (Cameron and Naomi), and the following week interfered in matches between Team Rhodes Scholars and Brodus Clay and Tensai, but were attacked by The Funkadactyls. The twins made their in–ring return facing and defeating The Funkadactyls on the March 27 episode of Main Event after interference from Cody Rhodes, and also defeated them on Raw five days later. The Bella Twins were scheduled to participate in an eight–person tag team match with Team Rhodes Scholars against Tons of Funk (Clay and Tensai) and The Funkadactyls at WrestleMania 29 on April 7, but the match was canceled due to time restraints, and instead took place the following night on Raw, where The Bella Twins and Team Rhodes Scholars were defeated. The twins continued their feud with The Funkadactyls, defeating them in standard tag team, and six-Diva tag team matches. In June, Nikki suffered a fractured tibia.

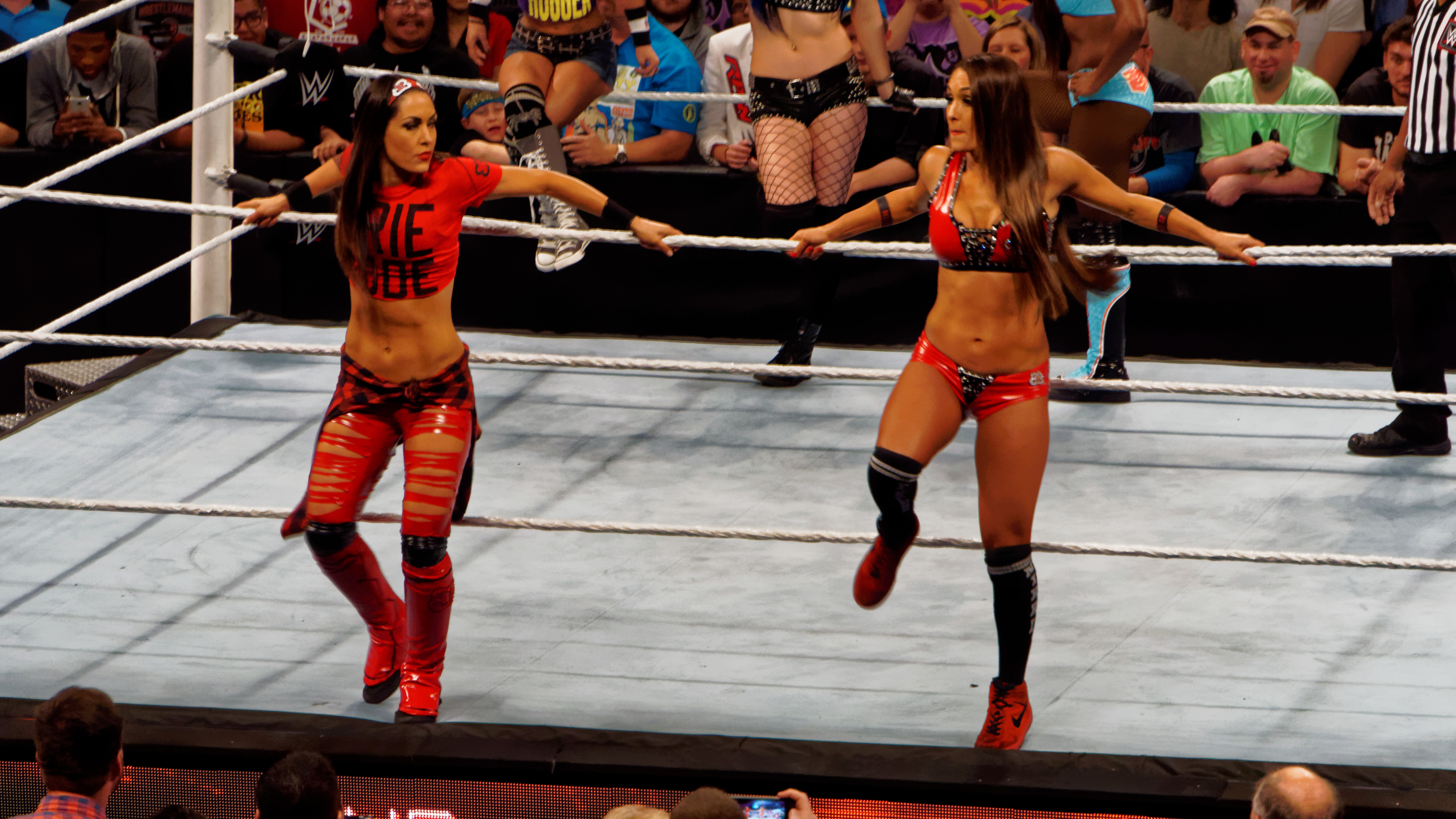
After returning to WWE, the twins began dressing in different outfits, as seen here

Upon the debut of the Total Divas reality television program in July, The Bellas returned and started a feud with their co-star on the show, Natalya. Brie and Natalya went on to trade victories in singles competition on Raw and at SummerSlam on August 18. The cast of Total Divas then transitioned into a scripted feud with Divas Champion AJ Lee, who mocked the show and cast, turning The Bellas faces in the process. Nikki returned to in-ring action on the October 25 episode of SmackDown, losing to Lee. At Survivor Series on November 24, the twins were part of the victorious Team Total Divas. On the December 9 episode of Raw, the twins were awarded Slammy Awards for Diva of the Year.

On April 6, 2014, Nikki competed at WrestleMania XXX in the 14-Diva "Vickie Guerrero Invitational match" for the Divas Championship, which was won by the defending champion AJ Lee. The same month, Brie became involved in her real-life husband Daniel Bryan's ongoing storyline with Stephanie McMahon and Kane, where as part of the storyline, McMahon threatened to fire Brie if, an injured, Bryan did not relinquish the WWE World Heavyweight Championship at Payback on June 1, which forced Brie to "quit" WWE before slapping McMahon in the face. After Brie quit, McMahon put Nikki in several handicap matches as punishment. After being absent for a month, Brie returned to WWE television, appearing in the crowd on July 21; following a confrontation, McMahon slapped Brie and was subsequently arrested. In order to have Brie drop the "charges", Brie was rehired and received a match against McMahon at SummerSlam.

At the pay-per-view on August 17, Nikki turned heel by attacking Brie, which allowed McMahon to win the match. The next several weeks saw the twins fight in several backstage and in-ring segments, including a cameo appearance from Jerry Springer on Raw on September 8. As part of the storyline, McMahon declared Nikki the face of the Divas division and granted her a match at Night of Champions for the Divas Championship on September 21, which she failed to win. Nikki then obtained permission to begin forcing Brie to compete in handicap matches, similar to her punishment at the hands of McMahon, although Brie was able to win them. This led to a match between the twins at Hell in a Cell on October 26, where the loser was forced to become the winner's personal assistant for 30 days, in which Nikki defeated Brie. Five days later on SmackDown, Nikki won a Halloween costume battle royal to become the number one contender for the Divas Championship.

==== Longest–reigning Divas Champion (2014–2015) ====
Nikki received her title match against AJ Lee on November 23 at Survivor Series, which she won with Brie's help to become a two-time Divas Champion. The duo had reconciled at this point, with Brie also turning heel in the process. Nikki then went on to retain her championship in three separate occasions – against Lee in a rematch on December 14, at TLC: Tables, Ladders & Chairs, against Naomi two days later on SmackDown, and against Paige at Fastlane on February 22, 2015. Paige and Lee then formed an alliance against the Bellas, which led to a tag team match at WrestleMania 31 on March 29, where Lee and Paige were victorious. On April 26, after Nikki, with the help of Brie, once again retained her title against Naomi at Extreme Rules a feud started with Naomi aligning with the returning Tamina to even the odds against the Bellas, who began showing more heroic characteristics. This change in character was criticized as "sudden", "randomly", and "for no reason". This led to a tag team match between the two teams at Payback on May 17, where Naomi and Tamina were victorious. At Elimination Chamber on May 31, Nikki retained her title against Naomi and Paige in a triple threat match, with Brie banned from ringside.

In June, The Bella Twins became villains once again by employing Twin Magic, which helped Nikki retain the title against Paige on the June 1 episode of Raw and at Money in the Bank on June 14. During the feud with Paige, Alicia Fox allied with them to form Team Bella. At The Beast in the East on July 4, Nikki retained the title against Paige and Tamina. After weeks of Team Bella outnumbering Paige, Naomi, and Tamina, Stephanie McMahon called for a "revolution" in the WWE Divas division and introduced the debuting Charlotte and Becky Lynch as Paige's allies, while NXT Women's Champion Sasha Banks debuted as an ally to Naomi and Tamina, which led to a brawl between the three teams. Nikki then lost to Charlotte in a tag team match on the August 3 episode of Raw, and to Banks on the August 17 episode of Raw in a non-title match. The three teams faced off at SummerSlam on August 23 in a three team elimination match, in which Team Bella first eliminated Team B.A.D. before Team PCB won.

On the September 14 episode of Raw, Nikki defended her title against Charlotte, who pinned Brie after the twins had switched places to win the match; however, since the title cannot change hands by disqualification, Nikki retained the championship, and in the process, became the new longest reigning Divas Champion in history, surpassing AJ Lee's previous record of 295 days. Nikki dropped the championship to Charlotte at Night of Champions on September 20, ending her reign at 301 days, and failed to regain the title in a rematch at Hell in a Cell on October 25.

Shortly after, Nikki went on a hiatus from television due to a neck injury which would require surgery, but returned for one night on December 21, to accept the Slammy Award for Diva of the Year. Nikki made a brief appearance at the WrestleMania 32 event on April 3, 2016, celebrating with Brie after winning a 10-Diva tag team match. In June, Nikki confirmed that she would no longer use her Rack Attack maneuver and began training with her sister's husband Daniel Bryan, who was teaching her a new finishing move. On July 21, she was revealed to be cleared for in-ring competition and continued her training at the WWE Performance Center.

==== Various storylines (2016–2018) ====
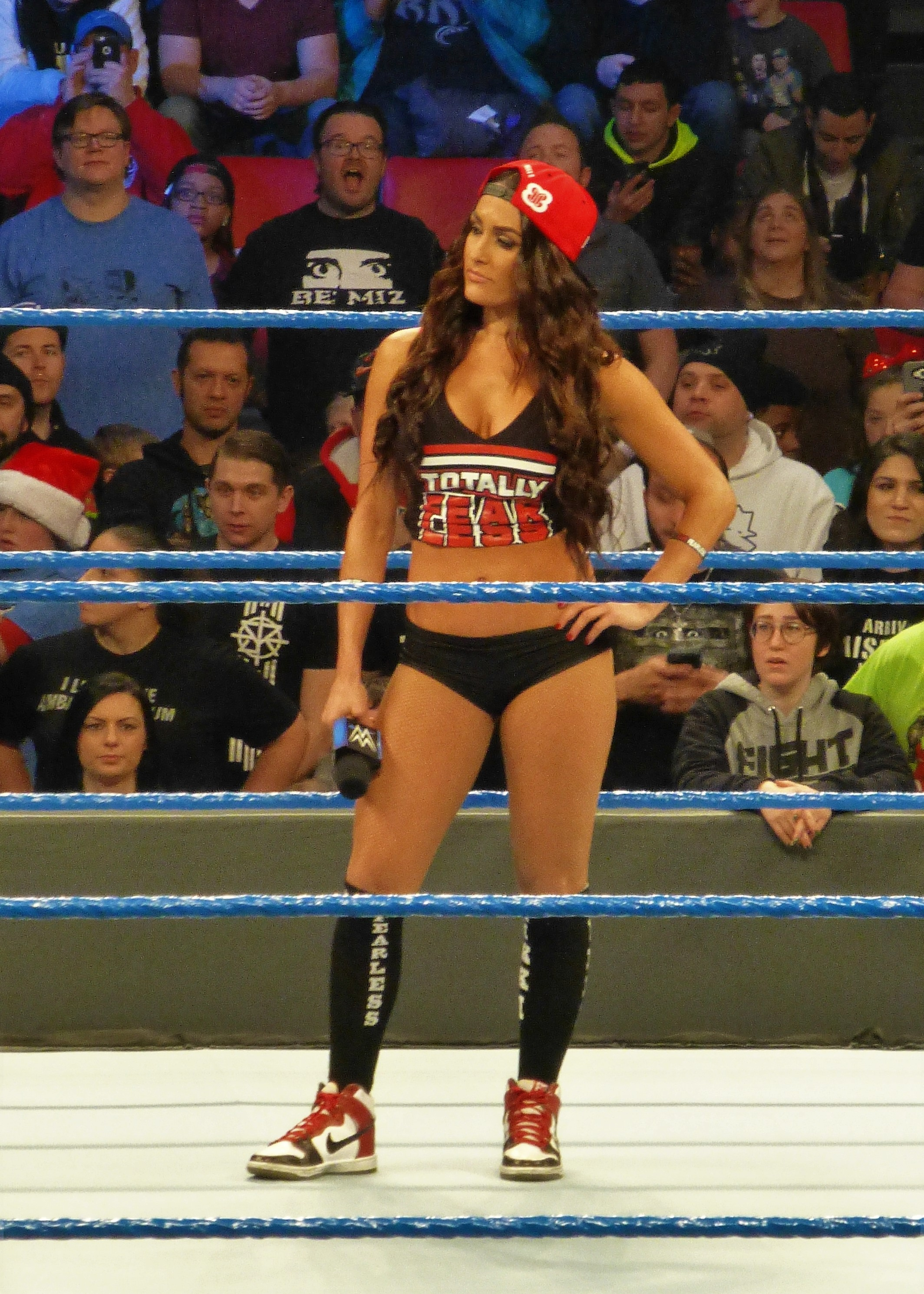
Bella in December 2016

After ten months of inactivity, Bella made a surprise return as a villain at the SummerSlam pay–per–view on August 21, 2016, where she replaced Eva Marie and teamed with Natalya and Alexa Bliss against Becky Lynch, Naomi, and Carmella whom they defeated after Bella pinned Carmella. This sparked a storyline feud between Bella (who was established as part of the SmackDown brand) and Carmella, also re-establishing Bella as a face in the process. Simultaneously with her feud with Carmella, Bella took part in a six–pack elimination challenge to determine the inaugural WWE SmackDown Women's Champion at Backlash on September 11, where she eliminated Natalya but was eliminated by Carmella. Bella eventually gained revenge as she defeated Carmella at No Mercy on October 9 and also at TLC: Tables, Ladders & Chairs in a no disqualification match on December 4 to end their feud.

Bella then became the team captain of Team SmackDown for the traditional five–on–five elimination match at Survivor Series. However, at the event on November 20, she was replaced by Natalya, after someone attacked her backstage before the match. In December, just after their feud ended, Carmella revealed Natalya as the attacker, who eventually confirmed it with the main reason being Bella's success and Natalya's downfall in the company. Upon the beginning of 2017, both women kept attacking each other, which led to a match at Elimination Chamber on February 12 that ended in a double count–out. In a rematch that took place on the February 21 episode of SmackDown, Natalya defeated Bella in a falls count anywhere match after Maryse attacked Bella with a lead pipe due to Bella accidentally tripping over her in the backstage make up area during her match with Natalya.

Maryse's attack sparked a feud between the two, which actually involved Bella's real real–life boyfriend John Cena and Maryse's real–life husband, The Miz. This led to a mixed tag team match between the two couples at WrestleMania 33 on April 2, which Cena and Bella won. After the match, Cena legitimately proposed to Bella, which she accepted. After that, she took time off from wrestling.

The Bella Twins appeared at the 25th Anniversary of Raw on January 22, 2018. A few days later, both Nikki and Brie competed in the inaugural women's royal rumble match at the 2018 Royal Rumble on January 28, where Nikki entered at #27, lasting 16 minutes and 30 seconds before she was the last woman eliminated by the eventual winner Asuka. Both twins made an appearance at the SummerSlam pay–per–view on August 19, showing their support for Ronda Rousey in her match with Alexa Bliss.

In September, The Bella Twins returned full-time on Raw and feuded with The Riott Squad (Ruby Riott, Liv Morgan and Sarah Logan), over which they scored victories in various tag team and singles matches. To even the odds, Ronda Rousey aligned with The Bella Twins, and the trio was able to defeat The Riott Squad at Super Show-Down in a six–woman tag team match on October 6. Two days later on the October 8 episode of Raw, after defeating The Riott Squad in a rematch, Nikki attacked Rousey, with Brie later following suit, turning villainous for the first time since 2015.

On October 28, Nikki faced Rousey for the Raw Women's Championship in the main event of the all women's pay–per–view, WWE Evolution, in which she was unsuccessful despite multiple interferences by Brie.

==== Ambassador and Hall of Fame (2019–2023) ====
On June 20, 2019, Bella ended her in-ring career after a cyst had been found on her brain.

On the February 21, 2020, episode of SmackDown, the Bella Twins were named for the WWE Hall of Fame Class of 2020.

On the second night of WrestleMania 37 on April 11, 2021, Nikki, along with her sister Brie, attacked Bayley, sending her rolling down the ramp, turning face once again in the process.

After being medically cleared, on the January 7, 2022, episode of SmackDown, Nikki participated in the women's Royal Rumble match at Royal Rumble on January 29; she entered at #24, eliminating Alicia Fox and Sarah Logan before being eliminated by her sister Brie, who was also in the match. This was the final WWE match for both sisters at the time.

On March 14, 2023, on their podcast The Nikki & Brie Show, Nikki and Brie announced that they and WWE had mutually agreed to not renew their contracts, as the twins wanted to start a new chapter in their lives. They subsequently reintroduced themselves as The Garcia Twins as "Garcia" was their maiden name.

=== Second return to WWE (2025–present) ===
On February 1, 2025, at Royal Rumble, Nikki Bella made a surprise return to WWE as the final entrant in the 2025 Women's Royal Rumble match. She eliminated Bayley before being eliminated by Nia Jax. Bella made her return to Raw on June 9 as a face, in her home state of Arizona and promoting Evolution 2, where she was interrupted and attacked by one-half of the WWE Women's Tag Team Champions, Liv Morgan. This was reportedly going to set up a match for Evolution, but the plans were scrapped after Morgan suffered a legitimate shoulder injury the following week.

On the July 7 episode of Raw, Bella announced that she would enter the Evolution Battle Royal for a women's world championship match at Clash in Paris. At the event on July 13, Bella finished in fourth place, being eliminated by Jax. The next night on Raw, Bella defeated Chelsea Green in her first singles match since 2018. On the August 1 episode of her and her sister's podcast show Nikki and Brie, Bella revealed that she suffered an injury on the July 28 episode of Raw while battling Piper Niven during an eight-woman tag team match, with her breast implants being dislocated and then afterwards pushed down into her ribs after she received an elbow drop. Over the next few weeks, she started feuding with Women's Intercontinental Champion Becky Lynch. At Clash in Paris, Bella failed to win the title from Lynch.

On the November 10 episode of Raw, Bella attacked Women's World Champion Stephanie Vaquer after her successful title defense against Raquel Rodriguez, turning heel for the first time since 2018. She failed to win the title from Vaquer at Survivor Series: WarGames.

After a short hiatus, Nikki returned at the Royal Rumble on January 31, 2026, as a face alongside the returning Brie, officially reuniting The Bella Twins. At WrestleMania 42, Nikki and Brie were originally scheduled to compete for the WWE Women's Tag Team Championship but due to an injury, Nikki was not medically cleared for the match. At the event on April 18, Nikki was replaced with a returning Paige, who teamed with Brie to win the titles. Bella made her return on the July 24 edition of Friday Night Smackdown fending off an attack from Fatal Influence and challenging them to a six-woman tag team match at SummerSlam. At Summerslam, the Bellas and Paige lost to Fatal Influence, after which the Bellas turned on Paige and turned heel.

== Other media ==
Nikki Garcia

YouTube information
- Channel: Nikki And Brie
- Years active: 2016-present
- Genre: Vlog
- Subscribers: 3.42 million
- Views: 164.5 million
- Last updated: August 26, 2026

Prior to working with WWE, the twins appeared on Meet My Folks. Both twins also appeared in the music video for "Right Side of the Bed" by the band Atreyu. They also appeared in the music video for "Na Na" by Trey Songz in 2014. The twins made a guest appearance on the MTV series Ridiculousness in October 2012.

The twins guest starred on the television series Psych, in the 2014 episode "A Nightmare on State Street". Nikki and Brie were a part of the main cast for the reality television show Total Divas, which began airing in July 2013, and starred in their own spinoff entitled Total Bellas. The show premiered on E! on October 5, 2016. Nikki and Brie co-starred in the 2014 independent film Confessions of a Womanizer, and provided voices for the 2015 movie The Flintstones & WWE: Stone Age SmackDown!. Both twins appeared on the WWE YouTube show The JBL & Cole Show. She appeared at the Miss USA 2013 pageant as one of the celebrity judges. They appeared at the 2014 MTV Europe Music Awards, where they presented the award for Best Female. The twins were both nominated for Choice Female Athlete at the 2015 Teen Choice Awards, an award they would later win at the 2016 ceremony.

On November 21, 2016, Nikki and Brie unveiled their new YouTube channel, "The Bella Twins". The sisters' channel features daily fashion, beauty, travel, fitness, relationship, and health videos, along with daily video blogs, created by the twins themselves. On April 2, 2018, The Bella Twins revealed that they were awarded the YouTube Gold Creator Award for reaching 1 million subscribers for their channel.

The Bella Twins appeared in YouTuber Lilly Singh's video "When Someone Tries to Steal Your BFF" on March 2, 2017. On August 21, 2017, Nikki and Brie launched their own wine label called Belle Radici in collaboration with Hill Family Estates and Gauge Branding. Nikki Bella was one of the celebrities competing on the 25th season of Dancing with the Stars. She was paired with professional dancer Artem Chigvintsev. She was eliminated on October 30, 2017.

On November 1, 2017, Nikki and Brie launched Birdiebee, a lifestyle intimates and activewear brand. The line includes transitional intimates, activewear, and loungewear aimed at "empowering and educating women through mirroring the twins' passion for life, strength, women's health and wellness, and fun."

On May 23, 2018, Bella appeared in the celebrity edition of American Ninja Warrior: Ninja vs Ninja.

On January 28, 2019, Nikki and Brie launched Nicole + Brizee, a body and beauty line. On March 27, 2019, Nikki and Brie launched their own podcast, The Bellas Podcast, with the Endeavour Audio network. In 2021, it was relaunched after being acquired by Stitcher, a subsidiary of SiriusXM.

In March 2020, Nikki and Brie released their memoir Incomparable, which became a New York Times Best Seller.

In 2021, Nikki and Brie launched another wine label called Bonita Bonita Wine. They also launched their own baby gear collection in partnership with Colugo. Nikki and Brie also joined Colugo as investors and creative advisors.

Nikki appeared on America's Got Talent: Extreme serving as a judge alongside Simon Cowell and Travis Pastrana. The series premiered on February 21, 2022, and concluded on March 14, 2022.

On October 19, 2022, Nikki joined Blake Shelton's bar-inspired game show named Barmageddon, serving as the host. On March 2, 2023, it was renewed for a second season. In November 2023, Nikki and Brie hosted the Amazon-produced dating game show, Twin Love.

On June 5, 2024, Nikki was named as one of the competitors on the third season of The Traitors, a reality competition series on Peacock. Competing against reality stars from Survivor, Big Brother, The Challenge and RuPaul's Drag Race among others, she was banished in the fifth episode, placing sixteenth overall.

== Personal life ==
In May 2014, Nikki revealed on Total Divas that she had married her high school sweetheart at the age of 20; the marriage was annulled three years later.

Nikki began dating John Cena in 2012. The couple became engaged on April 2, 2017, when Cena proposed to her after their mixed tag-team match at WrestleMania 33. On April 15, 2018, the couple called off the engagement and canceled their wedding, which was planned for May 5, 2018.

She began dating her Season 25 Dancing with the Stars partner and Russian dancer Artem Chigvintsev in January 2019. On January 3, 2020, the couple became engaged. On July 31, 2020, Nikki gave birth to their first child, a son. The couple married on August 26, 2022. On August 29, 2024, Chigvintsev was booked into Napa County Jail on a felony domestic violence charge which involved him inflicting corporal injury on a spouse. However, Nikki would not publicly discuss the incident, with her representative describing it as a "private matter." Almost two weeks after Chigvintsev's arrest, on September 11, 2024, Nikki filed for divorce. In court documents, Nikki cited "irreconcilable differences" with Chigvintsev and sought "legal and physical" custody of their child, but also requested that Chigvintsev be allowed to have child visitation. Both were granted restraining orders against each other. Napa County District Attorney Allison Haley declined to file criminal charges against Chigvintsev, stating there was not enough evidence to prove he inflicted injury to his wife. Nikki sought full custody of the child when she filed for divorce, requesting Chigvintsev have supervised visitation with their son and undergo anger management classes. However, after a court hearing in Napa County, it was announced the parents will share joint custody of their son, as Chigvintsev had previously requested when he submitted his divorce response in September.

Nikki and her sister Brie are supporters of the NFL's Philadelphia Eagles.

== Bibliography ==
- Incomparable (with Brie Bella) (Gallery Books, 2021, Hardcover) ISBN 1-50119-192-6, ISBN 978-1501191923

== Filmography ==
Film
Year	Title	Role	Notes
2014	Confessions of a Womanizer	Erica	Comedy-drama film directed and written by Miguel Ali.
2015	The Flintstones & WWE: Stone Age SmackDown!	Nikki Boulder; voice performance	Direct-to-video animated film directed by Spike Brandt and Tony Cervone.
2025	Happy Gilmore 2	Medusa Flex's caddy	
Television
Year	Title	Role	Notes
2002/2003	Meet My Folks	Unknown	
2011	Clash Time	Herself	Episode: "Turin" (season 1, episode 9)
2012	Ridiculousness	Herself	
2012	Clash Time	Herself	Episode: "Mania Mania" (season 2, episode 3)
2013–19	Total Divas	Herself	Main cast (seasons 1–8); Guest (season 9); Executive producer
2014	Psych	Herself	Episode: "A Nightmare on State Street" (season 8, episode 9)
2015	Unfiltered with Renee Young	Herself	Episode: "Nikki Bella" (season 1, episode 10)
2016–2021	Total Bellas	Herself	Main cast (seasons 1–6); Executive producer
2017	Dancing with the Stars	Herself	Contestant; Season 25
2018	Celebrity Ninja Warrior	Herself	Special celebrity edition of American Ninja Warrior to raise money for Red Nose Day.
2018	Drop the Mic	Herself	Episode: "WWE Superstars vs. GLOW / Laila Ali vs. Chris Jericho" (season 2, episode 9)
2018	Miz & Mrs.	Herself	Episode: "A Simple Mizunderstanding"
2020	Celebrity Call Center	Herself	Episode: "The Shift With the Baby on Board Bedroom How-To" (season 1, episode 3)
2021	The Bachelorette	Herself	(season 18, episode 4)
2022	Biography: WWE Legends	Herself	Episode: "The Bella Twins" (season 2, episode 3)
2022	America's Got Talent: Extreme	Judge	
2022–2024	Barmageddon	Host	
2023	Nikki Bella Says I Do	Herself	
2023	Twin Love	Co-host	
2024	Side Hustles	Herself	(season 1, episode 1)
2025	The Traitors	Herself	Contestant; Season 3

=== Video games ===
Nikki Bella in video games
Year	Title	Notes	Ref.
2009	SmackDown vs. Raw 2010	Video game debut	
2010	SmackDown vs. Raw 2011		
2011	WWE '12	DLC – "Divas Pack"	
2012	WWE '13		
2013	WWE 2K14	DLC – "WWE Superstars & Moves Pack"	
2014	WWE 2K15		
2015	WWE 2K16		
2016	WWE 2K17		
2017	WWE 2K18		
2018	WWE 2K19		
2019	WWE 2K20		
2020	WWE 2K Battlegrounds		
2023	WWE 2K23		
2025	WWE 2K25		
2026	WWE 2K26		

=== Music videos ===
Year	Title	Artist
2004	Right Side of the Bed	Atreyu
2014	Na Na	Trey Songz
2017	Hollywood	Sophia Grace

== Championships and accomplishments ==
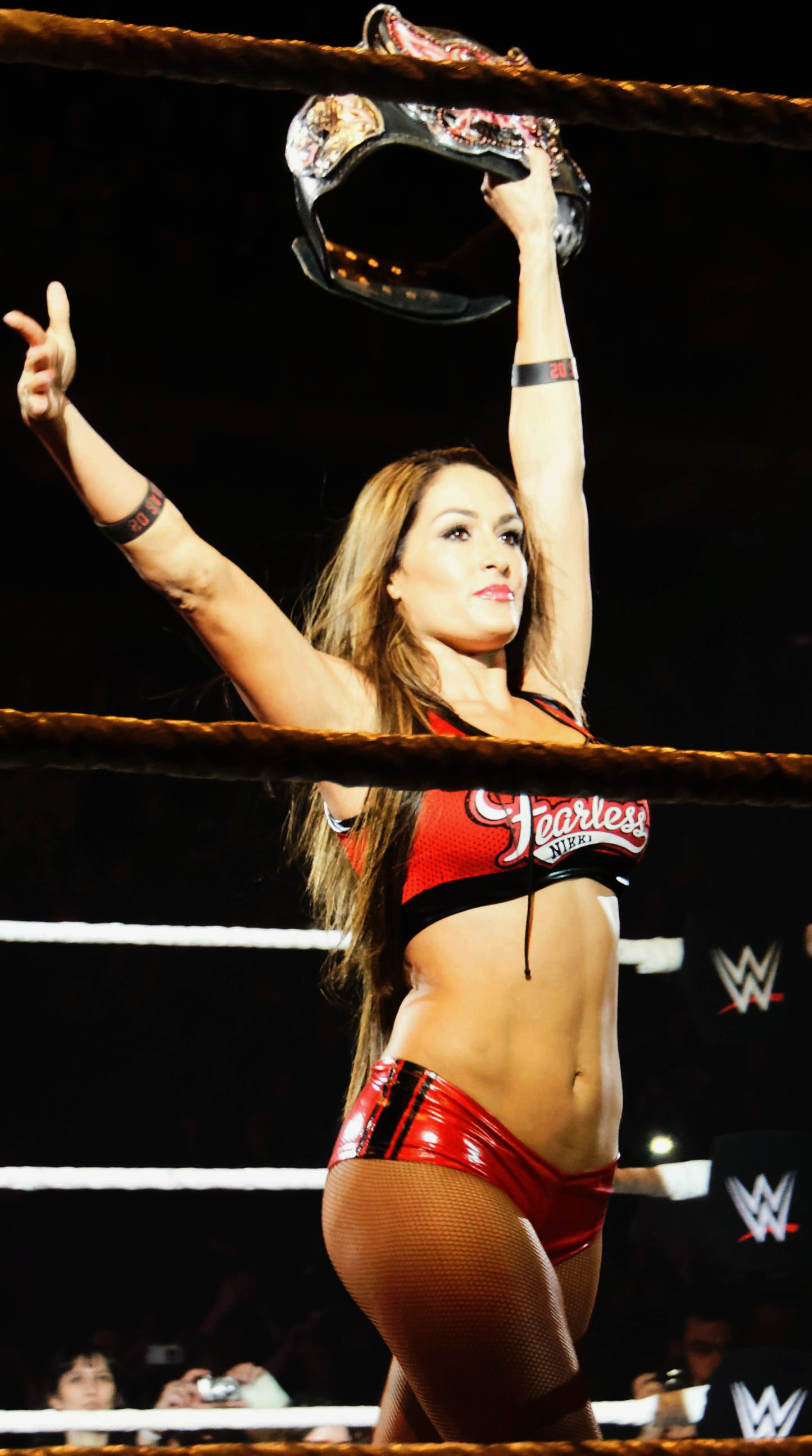
Nikki Bella is a two-time and longest reigning WWE Divas Champion

- Guinness World Records
  - World record: Longest WWE Divas Championship reign
- Pro Wrestling Illustrated
  - Ranked No. 1 of the top 50 female wrestlers in the PWI Female 50 in 2015
- Rolling Stone
  - Diva of the Year (2015)
  - Most Improved Wrestler (2015)
- Teen Choice Awards
  - Choice Female Athlete (2016) – with Brie Bella
- Wrestling Observer Newsletter
  - Worst Feud of the Year (2014) Brie vs. Nikki
  - Worst Feud of the Year (2015) Team PCB vs. Team B.A.D. vs. Team Bella
  - Worst Worked Match of the Year (2013) 14-woman elimination tag team match at Survivor Series
- WWE
  - WWE Divas Championship (2 times)
  - Slammy Award (2 times)
    - Diva of the Year (2013, 2015) – 2013 award shared with Brie Bella
  - WWE Hall of Fame (Class of 2020) – as a member of The Bella Twins
