= Miz & Mrs. =

American reality television series

- Promotional poster for Season 2
- Genre: Reality television
- Starring: Mike "The Miz" Mizanin; Maryse Mizanin
- Country of origin: United States
- Original language: English
- No. of seasons: 3
- No. of episodes: 50

Production
- Executive producers: Farnaz Farjam-Chazan; Gil Goldschein; Kevin Dunn; Chris Kaiser; Maryse Mizanin; Mike Mizanin; Russell Jay
- Running time: 21 minutes
- Production companies: Bunim/Murray Productions; World Wrestling Entertainment

Original release
- Network: USA Network
- Release: July 24, 2018 – July 25, 2022

Related
- Total Bellas; Total Divas

Miz & Mrs. is an American reality television series who premiered on July 24, 2018 and concluded on July 25, 2022 on USA Network. The series followed the lives of Mike "The Miz" Mizanin and Maryse Mizanin in and out of the wrestling ring. It is a spin-off of Total Divas, on which Maryse was a cast member.

== Production ==
On January 8, 2018, WWE announced that Mike and Maryse would be getting their own spinoff show, set to premiere in 2018 on USA Network, titled Miz & Mrs., that would follow the personal lives of the couple.

On May 22, 2018, it was announced that the series would premiere on July 24, 2018. On August 14, 2018, it was announced that USA Network had ordered additional episodes for the first season, following the success of the first six episodes. In February 2019, it was announced that the additional 14 episodes would begin airing on April 2, 2019. In June 2019, it was announced that Miz & Mrs. would return with new episodes rounding out its first season on Tuesday, August 6, 2019.

On April 2, 2019, USA Network renewed the show for a 20-episode second season, which premiered on January 29, 2020. In February 2021, it was announced by USA Network that the second half of season two would premiere on April 12, 2021.

On October 14, 2021, it was announced that the show was renewed for a 10-episode third season, which premiered on June 6, 2022.

== Cast ==
=== Main cast ===
- Mike "The Miz" Mizanin
- Maryse Mizanin

=== Recurring cast ===
- Marjolaine "Marjo" Martin, Maryse's mother
- George Mizanin, The Miz's father
- Barbara Pappas, The Miz's mother
- Ryan Cabrera, The Miz's friend
- Dolph Ziggler, The Miz's friend; wrestler
- John Morrison (seasons 1–2), The Miz's friend and teammate

=== Guest stars ===
- Alexa Bliss
- Asuka
- Avril Lavigne
- Brie Bella
- Carmella
- Curt Hawkins
- Matt Cardona
- Dana Brooke
- Dennis Haskins
- Elias
- Eric Young
- Heath Slater
- James Roday
- Kofi Kingston
- Liv Morgan
- Nia Jax
- Nikki Bella
- Paige
- Renee Young
- Ricochet
- Ronda Rousey
- Roman Reigns
- Rosa Mendes
- Ryan Lochte
- Sonya Deville
- Tamina
- Titus O'Neil
- Tyler Breeze
- Witney Carson
- Xavier Woods

== Episodes ==
=== Series overview ===
Season	Episodes	Originally released	
Season	Episodes	First released	Last released
1	20	July 24, 2018	August 27, 2019
2	20	January 29, 2020	May 17, 2021
3	10	June 6, 2022	July 25, 2022

=== Season 1 (2018–19) ===
No. overall	No. in season	Title	Original release date	Prod. code	U.S. viewers (millions)
1	1	"A Simple Mizunderstanding"	July 24, 2018	101	1.47
2	2	"Miz Takes the Cake"	July 31, 2018	102	1.30
3	3	"Certified Superdad"	August 7, 2018	103	1.23
4	4	"Proud Papa"	August 14, 2018	104	1.16
5	5	"Road Trip Mania"	August 21, 2018	105	1.24
6	6	"Cowboy Miz"	August 28, 2018	106	1.16
7	7	"Baby's First Summerslam"	April 2, 2019	107	1.00
8	8	"Mr. Mizanin's Neighborhood"	April 9, 2019	108	1.00
9	9	"Miz & Maryse Alone Time"	April 16, 2019	109	1.10
10	10	"Shop 'til You Draft"	April 23, 2019	110	0.94
11	11	"Three Dudes and a Baby"	April 30, 2019	111	0.84
12	12	"It's a Miz-tery"	May 7, 2019	112	0.90
13	13	"Miz's First Pitch"	May 14, 2019	113	1.10
14	14	"Miz Fest"	May 21, 2019	114	1.04
15	15	"Cheese Wheel of Miz-fortune"	July 23, 2019	115	0.72
16	16	"Miz Proofing"	July 30, 2019	116	0.91
17	17	"Heel No More"	August 6, 2019	117	1.06
18	18	"Renaissance Miz"	August 13, 2019	118	1.01
19	19	"French Invasion"	August 20, 2019	119	1.00
20	20	"It Couple in LA"	August 27, 2019	120	1.09

=== Season 2 (2020–21) ===
No. overall	No. in season	Title	Original release date	Prod. code	U.S. viewers (millions)
21	1	"Monroe's First Wrestlemania"	January 29, 2020	201	0.43
22	2	"Miz Little Lies"	February 5, 2020	202	0.47
23	3	"Baby Gender Miztery"	February 12, 2020	203	0.46
24	4	"A Star Isn't Born"	February 19, 2020	204	0.50
25	5	"Driving Miz Crazy"	February 26, 2020	205	0.39
26	6	"Mike 'The Miz' Day"	March 4, 2020	206	0.49
27	7	"Mr. Miz To The Rescue"	November 9, 2020	207	0.61
28	8	"Baby Moon Or Bust"	November 12, 2020	208	0.45
29	9	"Mizanin Family Tradition"	November 16, 2020	209	0.66
30	10	"The It Family Of Four"	November 19, 2020	210	0.41
31	11	"Miz-ter Mom"	November 26, 2020	211	0.38
32	12	"Dirt Sheet Duo Rides Again"	December 3, 2020	212	0.50
33	13	"Fear Of Miz-ing Out"	December 10, 2020	213	0.44
34	14	"An Olympic Failure"	December 17, 2020	214	0.55
35	15	"Mike's Man Cave"	April 12, 2021	215	0.71
36	16	"Dating and Mating"	April 19, 2021	216	0.66
37	17	"Mizsteaks & Weiners"	April 26, 2021	217	0.67
38	18	"Mizaninversary"	May 3, 2021	218	0.69
39	19	"The Mizanins Go Fishing"	May 10, 2021	219	0.78
40	20	"Mizectomy"	May 17, 2021	220	0.68

=== Season 3 (2022) ===
No. overall	No. in season	Title	Original release date	Prod. code	U.S. viewers (millions)
41	1	"Invitation to the Dance"	June 6, 2022	301	0.64
42	2	"Nobody Puts Miz in a Corner"	June 6, 2022	302	0.44
43	3	"Miz-ter Perfect"	June 13, 2022	303	0.52
44	4	"Miz's Pity Party"	June 20, 2022	304	0.59
45	5	"Fantasy Trip and Fall"	June 27, 2022	305	0.67
46	6	"Back to Miz-ness"	July 4, 2022	306	0.48
47	7	"A Miz's Best Friend"	July 11, 2022	307	0.67
48	8	"Merry Christmiz"	July 18, 2022	308	0.57
49	9	"Ricky Balboa"	July 25, 2022	309	0.54
50	10	"The Royal Return"	July 25, 2022	310	0.39
