= Barmageddon =

American television game show

- Logo of the first season
- Genre: Game show
- Created by: Lee Metzger; Blake Shelton; Carson Daly
- Directed by: Lee Metzger
- Presented by: Nikki Garcia
- Country of origin: United States
- Original language: English
- No. of seasons: 2
- No. of episodes: 17

Production
- Executive producers: Blake Shelton; Carson Daly
- Producers: Blake Shelton; Wyatt Oleff; Chris Wagner; Lee Metzger
- Production companies: Lucky Horseshoe Productions; Carson Daly Productions; JLP Pictures; White Label Productions

Original release
- Network: USA Network
- Release: December 5, 2022 – January 22, 2024

Barmageddon is an American television game show created and produced by Blake Shelton, Emmy Award-winning producer Lee Metzger, and Carson Daly, with Nikki Garcia serving as the host. The show premiered on December 5, 2022, on the USA Network.

== Production ==
On May 12, 2022, it was confirmed that award winning country singer Blake Shelton and television host Carson Daly would start their own game show named Barmageddon on the USA Network, with WWE Hall of Famer Nikki Bella serving as the host (her name was later changed to Nikki Garcia after her WWE contract expired in March 2023). The show takes place at Ole Red in Nashville, one of the chain bars owned by Shelton. On March 1, 2023, USA Network renewed the series for a second season.

== Gameplay ==
In a bar-themed game show, two celebrities compete against each other in five pub games, where the winner of the cash prize would choose a viral Internet sensation, where each has chosen to support.

== Episodes ==
Season	Episodes	Originally released	
Season	Episodes	First released	Last released
1	8	December 5, 2022	January 23, 2023
2	9	November 13, 2023	January 22, 2024

=== Season 1 (2022–23) ===
Note: Winners are listed in bold

No. overall	No. in season	Title	Blake Shelton's cover song	Original release date	U.S. viewers (millions)
1	1	Blake Shelton vs. **Kane Brown**	"Margaritaville" by Jimmy Buffett	December 5, 2022	0.650
Games Include: Beer Bombs, King Pong, Air Cannon Cornhole, Just The Tip, Sharts
2	2	Gwen Stefani vs. **Sheryl Crow**	"Glory Days" by Bruce Springsteen	December 12, 2022	N/A
Games Include: Drunken Axe-hole, Air Cannon Cornhole, Keg Kurling, Horn Stars, Buzzed Words
3	3	**Clint Bowyer** vs. Jimmie Johnson	"Good Ol' Boys" by Waylon Jennings	December 19, 2022	0.594
Games Include: Beer Bombs, Air Cannon Cornhole, Keg Kurling, H.O.R.S.E on a Horse, Four Play
4	4	**Jay Pharoah** vs. Martin Kove	"Family Tradition" by Hank Williams Jr.	December 26, 2022	0.408
Games Include: Beer Bombs, Just The Tip, Split Happens, H.O.R.S.E on a Horse, Four Play
5	5	**Brie Bella** vs. Sasha Banks	"Brown Eyed Girl" by Van Morrison	January 2, 2023	0.526
Games Include: King Pong, Just The Tip, Air Cannon Cornhole, H.O.R.S.E on a Horse, Four Play
6	6	**Mike Vrabel** vs. Trace Adkins	"Sweet Home Alabama" by Lynyrd Skynyrd	January 9, 2023	N/A
Games Include: Split Happens, King Pong, Just The Tip, Four Play, Buzzed Words
7	7	**Lil Rel Howery** vs. Malin Akerman	"My Life" by Billy Joel	January 16, 2023	N/A
Games Include: King Pong, Air Cannon Cornhole, 99 Bottles Of Beer On The Wall, Sharts, Buzzed Words
8	8	Chris Young vs. **Elle King**	"Sweet Caroline" by Neil Diamond	January 23, 2023	N/A
Games Include: Four Play, Air Cannon Cornhole, Keg Kurling, Hornstars, Drunken Axehole

=== Season 2 (2023–24) ===
Note: Winners are listed in bold

No. overall	No. in season	Title	Blake Shelton's cover song	Original release date	U.S. viewers (millions)
9	1	**Kelly Clarkson** vs. Michelle Rodriguez	"All My Ex's Live in Texas" by George Strait	November 13, 2023	N/A
Games Include: Fools Ball, Tic-Tac Throwdown, Air Cannon Cornhole, Drunken Axehole, and Buzzed Words
10	2	Blake Shelton vs. **Gwen Stefani**	"You Might Think" by The Cars	November 20, 2023	N/A
Games Include: Tic-Tac Throwdown, Air Cannon Cornhole, Fool's Ball, Four Play, and Buzzed Words
11	3	David Arquette vs. **Colbie Caillat**	"Keep Your Hands to Yourself" by The Georgia Satellites	November 27, 2023	N/A
Games Include: Tic-Tac Throwdown, King Pong, Keg Kurling, Beat Off, and Sharts
12	4	Gabriel Iglesias vs. **Jelly Roll**	"Authority Song" by John Mellencamp	December 4, 2023	N/A
Games Include: Fool's Ball, Tic-Tac Throwdown, Air Cannon Cornhole, Drunken Axehole, and Four Play
13	5	Carly Pearce vs. **Boyz II Men**	TBA	December 11, 2023	N/A
Games Include: Sharts, King Pong, Talk Derby to Me, Drunken Axehole, and Buzzed Words
14	6	**Rob Riggle** vs. Chris Hardwick	TBA	December 19, 2023	N/A
Games Include: Tic-Tac Throwdown, Air Cannon Cornhole, Just The Tip, Fool's Ball, and Four Play
15	7	**Nikki Glaser** vs. Al Madrigal	"I Love A Rainy Night" by Eddie Rabbitt	January 8, 2024	N/A
Games Include: Drunken Axehole, Just The Tip, Talk Derby to Me, Beat Off, and Sharts
16	8	Bill Engvall vs. **A. J. McCarron**	TBA	January 15, 2024	N/A
Games Include: Keg Kurling, Tic-Tac Throwdown, King Pong, Beat Off, and H.O.R.S.E. on a Horse
17	9	Lauren Alaina vs. **Blake Shelton**	TBA	January 22, 2024	N/A
Games Include: Beat Off, King Pong, Keg Kurling, Buzzed Words, and Sharts
