= Jillian Rose Reed =

American actress (born 1991)

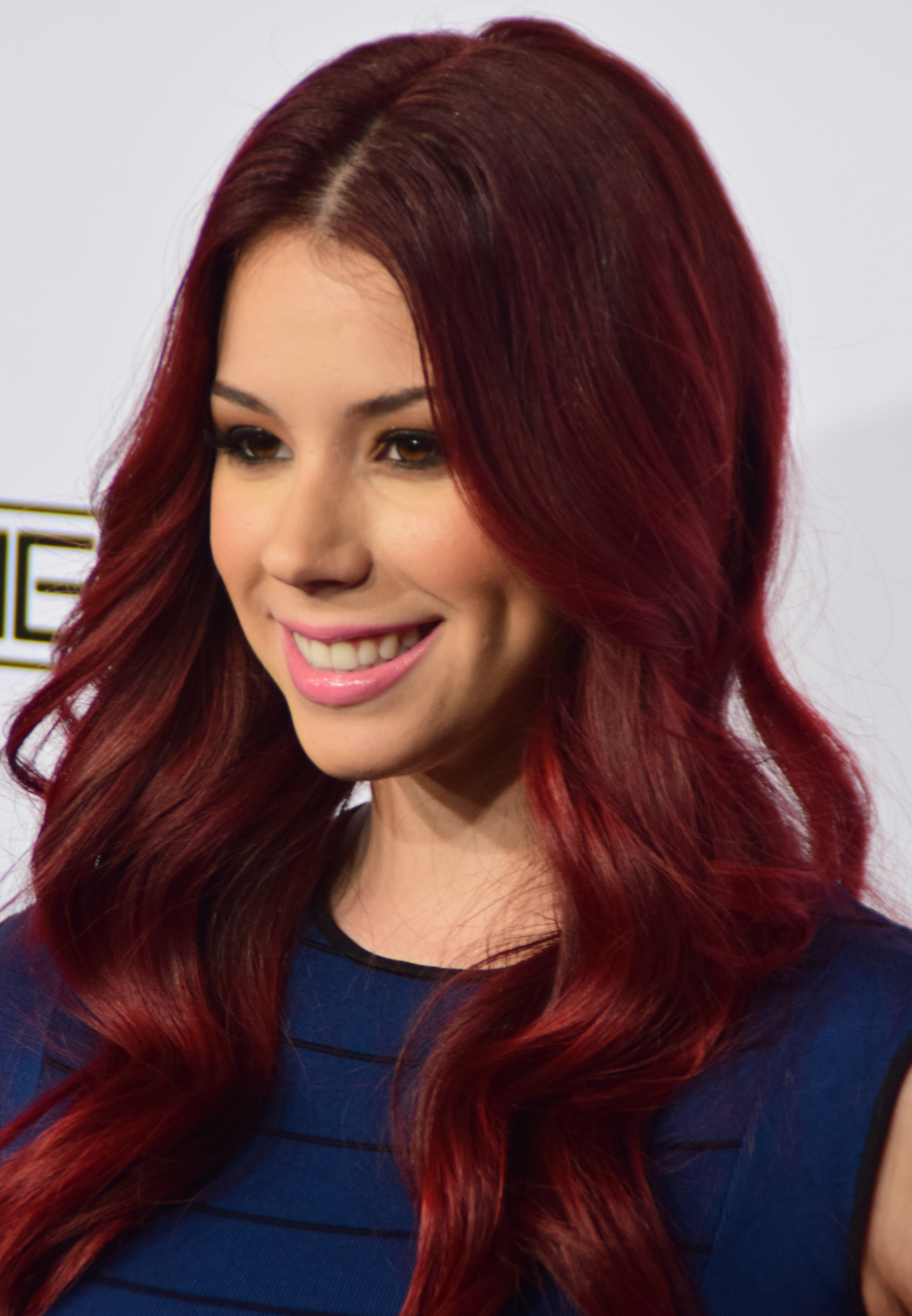
- Reed in 2015
- Born: December 20, 1991 (age 34); Hollywood, Florida, U.S.
- Occupation: Actress
- Years active: 2008–present
- Spouse: Marty Shannon
- Children: 1
- Relatives: Robbie Tucker (brother)

Jillian Rose Reed (born December 20, 1991) is an American actress. She is best known for playing the role of Tamara Kaplan in MTV's TV series Awkward.

== Early life ==
Reed was born in Hollywood, Florida, and raised in Coral Springs, Florida. She has two brothers, an older brother Matt and her younger brother is fellow actor Robbie Tucker. She performed competitive dance when she was about 4 as well as competitive jazz, tap and ballet in Michigan when she was twelve.

== Career ==
From 2008 to 2009, Reed played Simone on the dark comedy-drama series Weeds.

In 2011, Reed was cast as Tamara Kaplan on the MTV original series Awkward. The role earned her a Young Artist Award nominated for Best Performance in a TV Series - Leading Young Actress. In 2012, she starred in the TV film My Super Psycho Sweet 16: Part 3 as Sienna Brooks.

She played Megan in the 2014 film Confessions of a Womanizer with Andrew Lawrence and Gary Busey.

Reed also appeared in a 2014 episode of Jessie titled "Acting with the Frenemy" where she played Abbey. She also guest starred on two episodes of Jack Black's Yahoo series Ghost Ghirls.

== Personal life ==
Reed is involved with the American Diabetes Association due to her brother Matt having type 1 diabetes. Reed said in an interview with USA Today that "a lot of people think diabetes isn't one of those things that can happen to you. With the success of Awkward, I did have a voice. I can say something and people will listen, I can use social media and not just to tweet pictures of my cat."

== Filmography ==
=== Film ===
Year	Title	Role	Notes
2010	L.A. Vampire	Jailbait Vampire	Short film
2013	Age of Dinosaurs	Jade Jacobs	
2014	Confessions of a Womanizer	Megan	
2014	Finding Alice	Alice	Short film; voice role
2015	Jillian Rose Reed Takes the #KylieJennerChallenge	Herself	Short film
2018	Sharon 1.2.3.	Linda	

=== Television ===
Year	Title	Role	Notes
2008	Zoey 101	Girl #3	Episode: "Rumor of Love"
2008–2009	Weeds	Simone	Recurring role; 7 episodes
2009	Hung	Skinny Girl Tracie	Episode: "The Pickle Jar"
2010	Community	Kelly Cortlandt	Episode: "The Art of Discourse"
2010	The Middle	Shannon	Episode: "Errand Boy"
2011–2016	Awkward	Tamara Kaplan	Main role; 89 episodes
2011	Pair of Kings	Tessa	Episode: "The One About Mikayla's Friends"
2012	My Super Psycho Sweet 16: Part 3	Sienna Brooks	Television film
2013	Supah Ninjas	Gina / Wallflower	Episode: "Wallflower"
2013	Ghost Ghirls	Lizzie	Guest role; 2 episodes
2014	Del Weston on Film	Herself	Episode: "Del Weston's Action on Film Show with Jillian Rose Reed"
2014	Jessie	Abbey	Episode: "Acting with the Frenemy"
2015	Todrick	Herself	Guest
2016	Whats So Scary About Common Core	Beth	Television film
2016-2017	On Hiatus with Monty Geer	Julie Reed	Guest role; 2 episodes
2016–2020	Elena of Avalor	Naomi Turner	Main role; voice role
2016	Elena and the Secret of Avalor	Naomi Turner	Television film; voice role
2017	Daytime Divas	Kali T	Episode: "And the Loser Is..."
2017	Mondays	Elle	Television mini-series
2018	Lucifer	CeCe	Episode: "Let Pinhead Sing!"
2022	Raven's Home	Nori	Episode: "Mr. Petracelli's Revenge"

=== Web ===
Year	Title	Role	Notes
2014	Awkward. Webisodes	Tamara Kaplan	Main role; 3 episodes
2017	Foursome	Constance	Guest role; 2 episodes
2018	Love Daily	Gwen	Episode: "The Truth of Dating"

== Awards and nominations ==
Year	Award	Category	Nominated work	Results
2012	Young Artist Award	Best Performance in a TV Series - Leading Young Actress	Awkward	Nominated
