= Confessions of a Womanizer =

- Film poster
- Directed by: Miguel Ali
- Written by: Miguel Ali
- Produced by: Erick Crespo; Julia Haye; Rosalinda Morales; Pauline Ocon; Tim Schaaf; Jennie Marie Virgilio
- Starring: Gary Busey; C. Thomas Howell; Andrew Lawrence; Jillian Rose Reed; Nikki Bella; Brie Bella; Kelly Mantle
- Cinematography: Erick M. Crespo
- Edited by: Brad E. Wilhite
- Music by: Leland Cox
- Production companies: Mogar Pictures; Conquistador Films; Tower 8 Pictures; Rabia; Harbor House Films
- Distributed by: Harbor House Films
- Release dates: March 8, 2014 (Cinequest Film Festival); October 14, 2016 (United States)
- Running time: 90 minutes
- Country: United States
- Language: English

Confessions of a Womanizer (also known as Confessions of a Sex Addict) is a 2014 American comedy-drama film directed and written by Miguel Ali and starring Gary Busey, C. Thomas Howell, Andrew Lawrence, and Jillian Rose Reed.

== Story ==
Richie (Andrew Lawrence) is an arrogant guy whose only priority is a new girl every week, until he finds himself in a real relationship with Megan (Jillian Rose Reed). It causes him to confess his womanizing and how it was sparked by a scar caused years ago. His new best friend, Ginger, a transgender prostitute, helps bring these wounds to the surface.

== Cast ==
- Gary Busey as Gary
- C. Thomas Howell as Tony
- Andrew Lawrence as Ritchie
  - Andrew Miller and Jakob Miller as Young Ritchie
- Jillian Rose Reed as Megan
- Kelly Mantle as Ginger
- Nosheen Phoenix as Jasmine
- Andrew Caldwell as Matt
- Nikki Bella and Brie Bella as Erica and Sally
- Patricia de Leon as Patricia

== Production ==
In September 2012, The Hollywood Reporter announced that Jillian Rose Reed would star as Richie's love interest. Filming took place at the Silver Dream Factory Studio in Laguna Hills, California, and at the Harbor House Diner in Sunset Beach, California.

== Opening ==
Confessions of a Womanizer opened nationwide with AMC Theatres on October 14, 2016.

== Awards ==
Confessions of a Womanizer screened at 30 film festivals and won 10 awards. Kelly Mantle, who is genderfluid, made history when the film's producers sought both supporting actor and supporting actress consideration for their performance and The Academy granted the request.
