= Team B.A.D. =

Professional wrestling stable

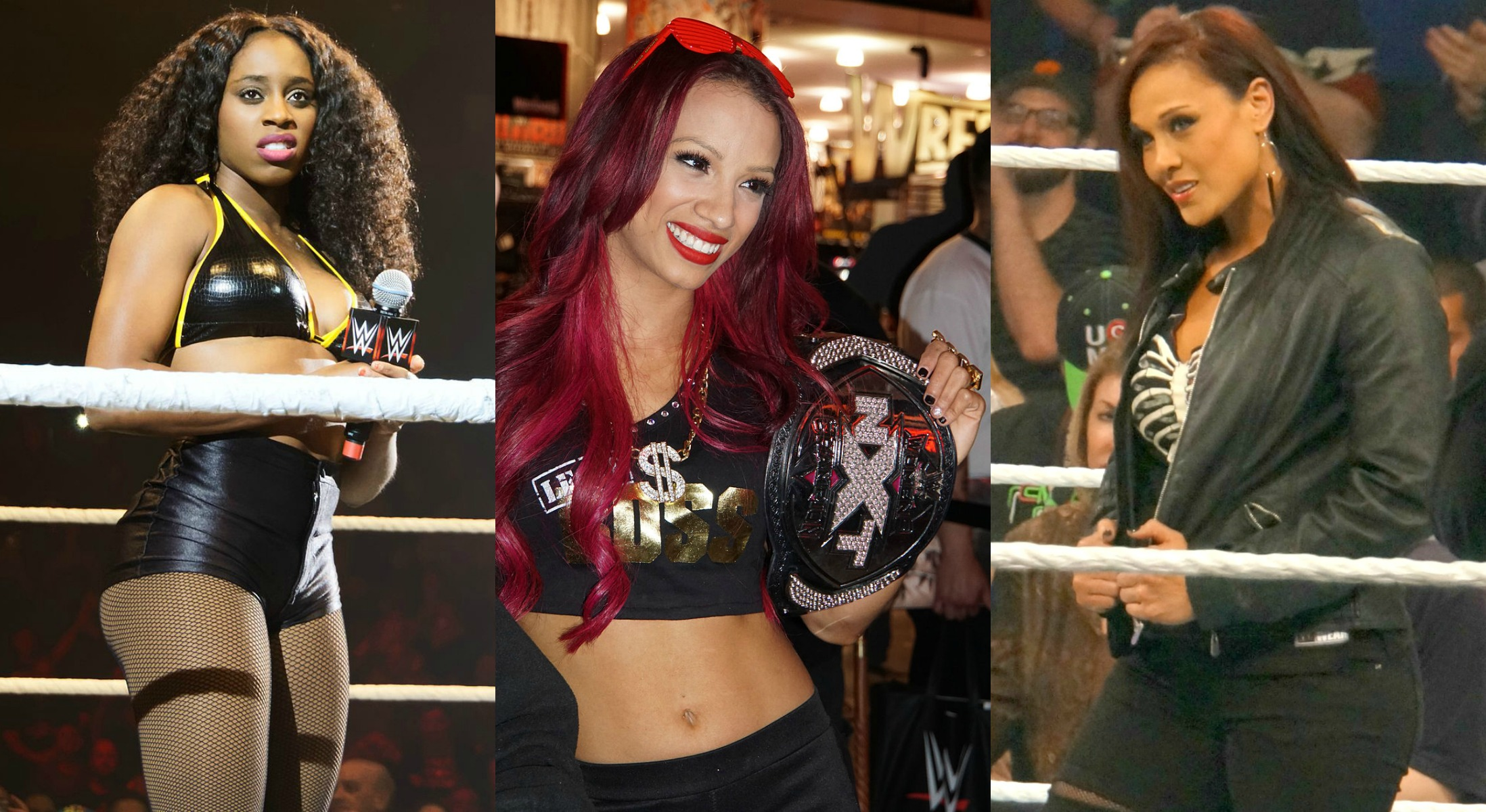
- The members of Team B.A.D. (from left to right): Naomi, Sasha Banks, and Tamina

Tag team
- Members: Naomi; Tamina; Sasha Banks
- Name: Team B.A.D.
- Debut: 2015
- Disbanded: 2022
- Years active: 2015–2016; 2022

Team B.A.D. (Beautiful And Dangerous) was an American professional wrestling stable that performed in WWE, consisting of Naomi, Tamina and Sasha Banks.

The inceptive variation of the team began and ended as a tag team consisting of Naomi and Tamina, but for most of its time was a trio also including Banks, who joined in July 2015 as part of the Divas Revolution storyline and left the team in February 2016. Both Naomi and Tamina are members of the Anoaʻi professional wrestling family.

== History ==
=== Formation and beginnings (2015) ===
In May 2015, Naomi aligned herself with her real life cousin-in-law Tamina Snuka, after having been outnumbered by The Bella Twins (Brie and Nikki Bella) on multiple occasions. Tamina and Naomi went on to defeat The Bella Twins in a tag team match at Payback.

=== Divas Revolution (2015–2016) ===
On the July 13 episode of Raw, after weeks of being outnumbered by The Bella Twins and their ally Alicia Fox, WWE authority figure Stephanie McMahon called for a "revolution" in the WWE Divas division and introduced then debuting NXT Women's Champion Sasha Banks as an ally to Naomi and Tamina, after bringing in Charlotte and Becky Lynch to ally with Paige, leading to a brawl between the three teams.

At Battleground, a triple threat match took place with Sasha Banks representing Team B.A.D. against Charlotte of Team Paige (later known as Team PCB), and Brie Bella for Team Bella in a losing effort while Charlotte picked up the victory. The following night on the July 20 episode of Raw, Naomi and Sasha Banks were victorious in a tag team match against Paige and Becky Lynch. Banks went on to defeat Paige again on the July 27 episode of Raw in a singles match. The three teams would ultimately face off at SummerSlam in a three team elimination match, where Team B.A.D. were the first team to be eliminated courtesy of Team Bella when Tamina was pinned by Brie, and Team PCB would win the match.

After defeating then-WWE Divas Champion Nikki Bella by submission in a non-title match on the August 17 episode of Raw, Banks participated in the first ever Divas number one contender's Beat the Clock challenge, in which she fought Paige to a time limit draw and Charlotte was named the number one contender. At NXT TakeOver: Brooklyn, Banks lost the NXT Women's Championship to Bayley, ending her reign at 192 days. The match won Match of the Year at the NXT Year-End Awards. Following this, Banks began a short feud with Paige and defeated her twice on the September 7 and 14 episodes of Raw, and fought to a no contest on the September 10 episode of SmackDown. Banks wrestled her final match in NXT at NXT TakeOver: Respect, losing to Bayley in WWE's first-ever women's 30-minute Iron Man match, with a score of two falls to three.

Although she lost in a fatal four-way number one contender's match for Charlotte's Divas Championship in November, Banks was not pinned and started a winning streak, defeating the likes of Brie Bella Alicia Fox, and Becky Lynch, whom she again defeated after distractions by Naomi and Tamina on the TLC: Tables, Ladders & Chairs kickoff show on December 13.

=== Banks' split and initial dissolution (2016) ===
Banks returned at the Royal Rumble pay-per-view on January 24, 2016, after about a month off television, attacking Charlotte and Becky Lynch after their Divas Championship match, showing her intentions to challenge for the championship. Prior to a match with Lynch on the February 1 episode of Raw, Banks claimed that she was "on her own", signaling that she had moved on from the group, at which Naomi and Tamina declared that there were no hard feelings; however, during Sasha's match with Lynch, the duo attacked Banks until she was saved by Lynch, turning Banks into a face in the process. The feud between Banks, Naomi and Tamina would continue throughout February, and would lead to a tag team match at Fastlane on February 21, where Naomi and Tamina lost.

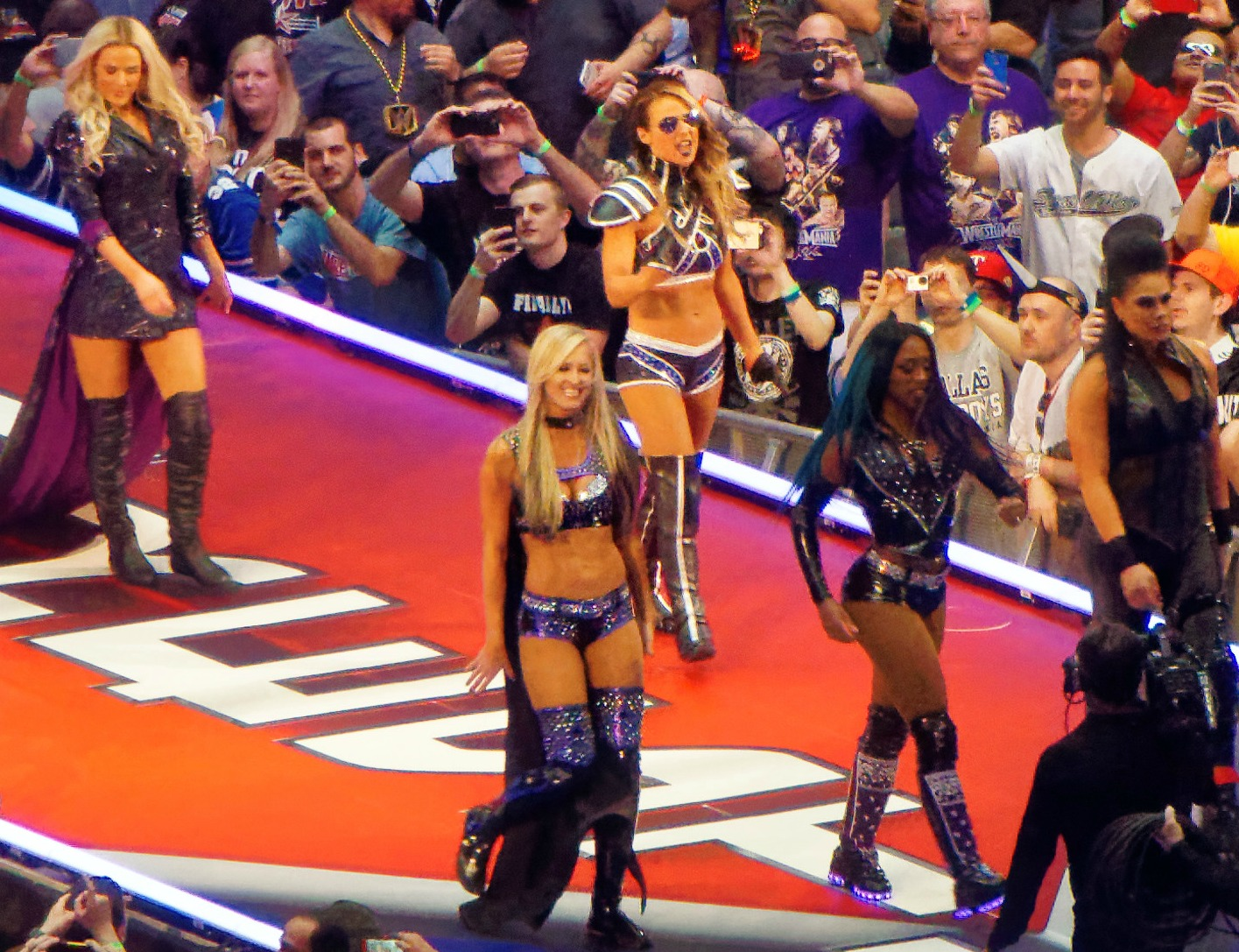
Team B.A.D. & Blonde members, walking to the ring before their match at the WrestleMania 32 event in April 2016

After their feud with Banks, Team B.A.D. formed a brief alliance with Lana, Emma and Summer Rae, and on the March 14 episode of Raw, they defeated Alicia Fox and Brie Bella after a distraction by Lana. Team B.A.D. allied with her later in a segment backstage after confronting Paige, and later allied with Emma and Rae the week after on Main Event. The following week on Raw, they accompanied Emma to her match against Paige, where Emma won, after which they attacked Paige's allies (Alicia Fox, Brie Bella and Natalya) before they were saved by a returning Eva Marie. As a result, a 10-Diva tag team match between the two newly dubbed alliances, "Team Total Divas" and "Team B.A.D. & Blonde", was announced for the WrestleMania 32's pay-per-view pre-show. At the event on April 3, they were defeated by Team Total Divas after Naomi submitted to Brie Bella. After appearing sporadically since WrestleMania, Team B.A.D. disbanded in early May, when Tamina underwent knee surgery in order to repair torn ligaments, and Naomi began filming The Marine 5: Battleground, and was injured with a torn ankle tendon. Both Naomi and Tamina would be drafted to SmackDown (Naomi during 2016 WWE draft, and Tamina during the 2017 WWE Superstar Shake-up).

=== WWE Women's Tag Team Champions (2022) ===
On the February 25, 2022, edition of SmackDown, Naomi announced that her and Sasha Banks were going to challenge for the WWE Women's Tag Team Championship, thus reuniting the team as a duo. On the following episode of Raw, reigning champions Carmella and Queen Zelina would accept their challenge, consequently setting up the bout for WrestleMania 38. Over the following weeks, the respective teams of Rhea Ripley and Liv Morgan, and Natalya and Shayna Baszler, would be added to the bout, thereby making it a fatal four-way tag team match. At the event, Banks and Naomi were successful in their pursuit, as Banks put an end to her streak of WrestleMania losing efforts and entered her record-tying third reign with the title. During the May 16 episode of Raw, Banks and Naomi reportedly walked out after a meeting with Vince McMahon due to a creative dispute. WWE released an official statement, in which the company stated Banks and Naomi "walked into WWE Head of Talent Relations John Laurinaitis' office with their suitcases in hand, placed their tag team championship belts on his desk and walked out". The two were originally booked for the show's main event, which had to be reworked. On the following episode of SmackDown, it was announced that Banks and Naomi had been suspended indefinitely, therefore the titles were vacated. Banks subsequently left WWE in the summer and would later debut at Wrestle Kingdom 17 under the name Mercedes Moné. Naomi confirmed she was no longer with WWE in March 2023 until she would return to the company in January 2024.

== Championships and accomplishments ==
Only championships and accomplishments that were achieved while as a tag team are listed. For example, although Sasha Banks is a three-time WWE Women's Tag Team Champion, only one of those reigns occurred while officially being in a tag team with Naomi.

- Wrestling Observer Newsletter
  - Worst Feud of the Year (2015) Team PCB vs. Team B.A.D. vs. Team Bella
- WWE
  - NXT Women's Championship (1 time)
  - WWE Women's Tag Team Championship (1 time) – Banks and Naomi
  - NXT Year-End Award (1 time)
    - Match of the Year (2015) – Banks vs. Bayley at NXT TakeOver: Brooklyn
