= Total Bellas =

American reality television series

- The third seasons' promotional poster
- Genre: Reality television
- Starring: Brie Bella; Nikki Bella; Bryan Danielson; John Cena; Artem Chigvintsev
- Opening theme: "We've Come So Far" by Felicia Barton featuring KIT Walters
- Composer: Nate Dodge
- Country of origin: United States
- Original language: English
- No. of seasons: 6
- No. of episodes: 54

Production
- Executive producers: Brie Bella; Nikki Bella; Kevin Dunn; Gil Goldshein; Russell Jay; Jeff Jenkins; Jonathan Murray
- Production locations: Tampa, Florida; Phoenix, Arizona; San Diego, California; New York City; Paris, France
- Camera setup: Multi-camera
- Running time: 41–43 minutes
- Production companies: Bunim/Murray Productions; WWE

Original release
- Network: E!
- Release: October 5, 2016 – January 28, 2021

Related
- Total Divas; Miz & Mrs.

Total Bellas is an American reality television series that aired from October 5, 2016, to January 28, 2021 on E!. A spin-off of Total Divas, the series gave viewers a further look into the lives of twin sisters and professional wrestlers, The Bella Twins (Brie and Nikki), along with their immediate family and partners.

== Production ==
On April 20, 2016, it was announced that former WWE wrestlers Brie and Nikki Bella—collectively known as the Bella Twins—would be getting a spin-off show entitled Total Bellas. The first season premiered on October 5, 2016. The show revolves around the lives of the twins and their family. Filming for the first season was set in Tampa, Florida as Brie Bella and Daniel Bryan moved in with Nikki Bella and John Cena to help Nikki after her neck surgery. Brie and Nikki's brother JJ and his wife Lauren had a recurring role along with their mother Kathy Colace and her now husband John Laurinaitis.

On November 16, 2016, it was announced that E! renewed the show for a second season. The second season premiered on September 6, 2017. The second season was filmed in Phoenix, Arizona as Nikki Bella and John Cena move in with Brie Bella and Daniel Bryan to help Brie through her first pregnancy. In addition to Brie's growing baby bump, the second season documented Daniel's travels under his new role as General Manager of WWE's SmackDown Live.

On January 30, 2018, it was announced that a third season would be premiering in spring of 2018. On April 5, 2018, the premiere date for the third season was announced, airing on May 20, 2018.

On August 7, 2018, E! and WWE announced that Total Bellas had been renewed for a fourth season. On November 28, 2018, it was announced that the fourth season would premiere on January 13, 2019.

On June 19, 2019, while appearing on The Tonight Show Starring Jimmy Fallon, Brie and Nikki announced that the series would return for a fifth season which premiered on April 2, 2020.

On June 11, 2020, the series was renewed for a sixth season which premiered on November 12, 2020.

In June 2021, Essentially Sports reported that E! had canceled Total Bellas and its sister show Total Divas, citing low ratings and a lack of interest from those involved.

== Cast ==
=== Main ===
Cast member	Seasons					
Cast member	1	2	3	4	5	6
Brie Bella	Main	Main	Main	Main	Main	Main
Nikki Bella	Main	Main	Main	Main	Main	Main
Daniel Bryan	Main	Main	Main	Main	Main	Main
John Cena	Main	Main	Main			
Artem Chigvintsev				Guest	Main	Main

=== Recurring ===
Cast member	Seasons					
Cast member	1	2	3	4	5	6
Kathy Colace (Brie and Nikki's mother)	Recurring	Recurring	Recurring	Recurring	Recurring	Recurring
J.J. Garcia (Brie and Nikki's brother)	Recurring	Recurring	Recurring	Recurring	Recurring	Recurring
John Laurinaitis (Brie and Nikki's stepfather)	Recurring	Recurring	Recurring	Recurring	Recurring	Guest
Lauren "Lola" Garcia (Brie and Nikki's sister-in-law)	Recurring	Recurring	Recurring	Recurring	Recurring	Guest
Maya Laurinaitis (Brie and Nikki's stepsister)					Recurring	Guest
Jon Garcia (Brie and Nikki's father)					Recurring	Guest

== Episodes ==
=== Series overview ===
Season	Episodes	Originally released	
Season	Episodes	First released	Last released
1	6	October 5, 2016	November 9, 2016
2	8	September 6, 2017	October 25, 2017
3	10	May 20, 2018	July 29, 2018
4	10	January 13, 2019	March 24, 2019
5	11	April 2, 2020	June 11, 2020
6	9	November 12, 2020	January 28, 2021

=== Season 1 (2016) ===
No. overall	No. in season	Title	Original release date	U.S. viewers (millions)
1	1	"The Cena House Rules"	October 5, 2016	0.63
2	2	"Quickie Fix"	October 12, 2016	0.75
3	3	"Who's the Boss?"	October 19, 2016	0.62
4	4	"Bryan's Breaking Point"	October 26, 2016	0.63
5	5	"Bella Family Secrets"	November 2, 2016	0.53
6	6	"Wedding Mania"	November 9, 2016	0.66

=== Season 2 (2017) ===
No. overall	No. in season	Title	Original release date	U.S. viewers (millions)
7	1	"A Desert Dilemma"	September 6, 2017	0.68
8	2	"Marital Mayhem"	September 13, 2017	0.55
9	3	"Who's Your Mama?"	September 20, 2017	0.57
10	4	"Power Struggle"	September 27, 2017	0.56
11	5	"Wine About It"	October 4, 2017	0.53
12	6	"The Wrong Move"	October 11, 2017	0.55
13	7	"Countdown to Mania"	October 18, 2017	0.56
14	8	"Bella-Mania"	October 25, 2017	0.67

=== Season 3 (2018) ===
No. overall	No. in season	Title	Original release date	U.S. viewers (millions)
15	1	"Have You Cena?"	May 20, 2018	0.51
16	2	"What to Expect When You're Not Expecting"	May 27, 2018	0.50
17	3	"What Comes Up, Must Go Down"	June 3, 2018	0.65
18	4	"The Bella Comeback"	June 10, 2018	0.73
19	5	"Make Up or Break Up?"	June 17, 2018	0.72
20	6	"Once Again the Future Mrs. Cena"	June 24, 2018	0.66
21	7	"Save the Date"	July 8, 2018	0.72
22	8	"A Bella Bachelorette"	July 15, 2018	0.59
23	9	"Paris Bachelorette Part Deux"	July 22, 2018	0.61
24	10	"Follow Your Heart"	July 29, 2018	0.62

=== Season 4 (2019) ===
No. overall	No. in season	Title	Original release date	U.S. viewers (millions)
25	1	"Bellas Are Back in Action"	January 13, 2019	0.51
26	2	"Bellas and the City"	January 20, 2019	0.46
27	3	"Troublemaker"	January 27, 2019	0.45
28	4	"It's My Life"	February 10, 2019	0.39
29	5	"The Big Mistake"	February 17, 2019	0.42
30	6	"The First Date"	February 24, 2019	0.42
31	7	"When a Good Girl's Gone Bad"	March 3, 2019	0.41
32	8	"Road to Evolution"	March 10, 2019	0.44
33	9	"Women Take Center Stage"	March 17, 2019	0.39
34	10	"The Evolution of the Bellas"	March 24, 2019	0.44

=== Season 5 (2020) ===
No. overall	No. in season	Title	Original release date	U.S. viewers (millions)
35	1	"Brave New Bellas"	April 2, 2020	0.56
36	2	"The Book of Bella"	April 9, 2020	0.45
37	3	"Bellas Without Borders"	April 16, 2020	0.46
38	4	"Playing Favorites"	April 23, 2020	0.52
39	5	"BellaVision"	April 30, 2020	0.60
40	6	"Salsa Caliente"	May 7, 2020	0.41
41	7	"Bella Vs. Bella"	May 14, 2020	0.48
42	8	"Off the Deep End"	May 21, 2020	0.53
43	9	"Sweat It Out"	May 28, 2020	0.44
44	10	"The Proposal"	June 4, 2020	0.41
45	11	"Babies on Board"	June 11, 2020	0.69

=== Season 6 (2020–21) ===
No. overall	No. in season	Title	Original release date	U.S. viewers (millions)
46	1	"Bella Baby Bumps"	November 12, 2020	0.41
47	2	"Bellas Break Free"	November 19, 2020	0.25
48	3	"A Bella Babymoon"	December 3, 2020	0.29
49	4	"A Bella Babyshower"	December 10, 2020	0.22
50	5	"Bye Bye Bella"	December 17, 2020	0.31
51	6	"Family Ties"	January 7, 2021	0.43
52	7	"Bella Babies"	January 14, 2021	0.38
53	8	"Bellas on the Move"	January 21, 2021	0.36
54	9	"From Gynos to Wino"	January 28, 2021	0.43

== Awards and nominations ==
Year	Award	Category	Nominee(s)	Result	ref
2016	Teen Choice Awards	Choice Female Athlete	The Bella Twins	Won	
2017	Teen Choice Awards	Choice TV Female Athlete	The Bella Twins	Nominated	
2017	Teen Choice Awards	Best Reality Show	Total Bellas	Nominated	
2018	Teen Choice Awards	Choice Summer TV Show	Total Bellas	Nominated	

== Broadcast ==
The show is broadcast in The United Kingdom, Canada, New Zealand, France and South Africa on the local E! network.

The series is also available on Hulu, WWE Network and Peacock.
