= Meet My Folks =

- Created by: Bruce Nash
- Developed by: Nash Entertainment
- Starring: Nick Savastano
- Country of origin: United States
- Original language: English
- No. of seasons: 2
- No. of episodes: 20

Production
- Executive producers: Scott Satin; Bruce Nash
- Producer: Nick Savastano
- Running time: 45–50 minutes
- Production companies: Nash Entertainment; NBC Studios

Original release
- Network: NBC
- Release: July 22, 2002 – August 25, 2003

Meet My Folks is an American comedy reality television series which aired on NBC from July 22, 2002 to August 25, 2003.

The series was apparently inspired by, but has no direct connection to, the 2000 comedy film Meet the Parents, wherein a man must seek the approval of his girlfriend's demanding parents before proposing. One of the film's best-known elements, a lie detector test, also figures prominently in the series. The film's producers, Universal Studios (now under common ownership with NBC), had at one point considered legal action over the program, specifically the title and the lie detector segment, but this did not come to fruition.

== Plot ==
On this show, three bachelors spend three days with the possible "woman or man of their dreams" and her or his family in their home, with conversations and interaction intended to reveal the bachelors' character and intentions. The winner gets a week in Hawaii with "Miss Right," if her or his family approves.

== Episodes ==
=== Season 1 (2002) ===
No.	Title	Original release date	Prod. code
1	"The Blankenships"	July 22, 2002	101
In the series premiere, Chris is a boxer, Kory a student, and Jason, a construction worker must compete to win a vacation in Hawaii with Randy and Rhoda Blankenship's daughter Senta. After the first bachelor is eliminated, the remaining two are subjected to a lie detector test (which becomes a recurring theme in the series), which helps the parents determine which bachelor they want to go to Hawaii with Senta.
2	"The DeCastros"	July 24, 2002	102
Anthony, Shane, and Camron try to win a trip to Hawaii with Jessica DeCastro, but must first get the approval of her parents.
3	"The Alexanders"	July 31, 2002	103
Parents Will and Lori Alexander of Southern California choose a date for their daughter Jaimi. The three contestants, who spend a weekend with the family, are Darien is a jazz musician. Johnathan is a student mentor. Amir, a fashion model. The contestants get a surprise when they find out Jaimi's father is a U.S. marine, and aren't too happy that one of their challenges is an early-morning obstacle course.
4	"The Reeves"	August 5, 2002	104
Larry and Tina Reeves choose a date for Stephanie, their daughter, from three bachelors: Eric is a bartender, Joe is a valet and student, and Brad is a doorman.
5	"The Atnips"	August 12, 2002	105
Alan Atnip, a correctional officer, and his wife Dawn must choose a date for their daughter Chloe. They must choose between a construction worker named Chris, a substitute teacher named James, and a chemical researcher named CJ.
6	"The Figgs"	August 19, 2002	106
It's a weekend at the Figgs' house for Lisa who waits tables, Jamie who's an actress, and Carrie who was Ms. Teen USA at age 16. Terri and Joseph Figg must pick which girl will win the trip to Hawaii with their son Josh.
7	"The Carlsons"	August 26, 2002	107
On the first season finale, Bob and Jan Carlson must pick a date for their daughter Krissy, who's a model. JD is member of a band. Bobby is a bouncer from Hawaii, and Giancarlo is a mortgage broker go through a series of challenges and encounter multiple surprises, including a trip to a fertility center, while spending the weekend with the Carlsons.

=== Season 2 (2003) ===
No.	Title	Original release date	Prod. code
8	"The Maloneys (Part 1)"	January 20, 2003	108
In the second season premiere, Julie and Jim Maloney pick from not three, but eight girls on their search for the perfect date for their son Dan. Melissa, Jackie, Lisa, Stefanie, Tawny, Shannon, Hillary and Chelsea arrive to impress the Maloneys and win a trip to Europe with Dan. The girls have no time to settle in, as they're quickly shocked by the secret one of the contestants is hiding. By the end of this first part of the three-part episode, only five of the girls remain.
9	"The Maloneys (Part 2)"	January 21, 2003	109
Wink Martindale from Tic Tac Dough drops by to give the girls a quiz, Dan takes the girls on a revealing group date at a spa, and the lie detector test returns in the second part of this three-part episode. In addition, the ex-boyfriends drop by to reveal some interesting secrets about the girls. Mom and Dad must eliminate two more girls, leaving only three left at the end of the episode.
10	"The Maloneys (Conclusion)"	January 25, 2003	110
In the third and final episode at the Maloneys' house, a winner is finally picked from the remaining three girls - Chelsea, Stefanie, and Tawny. As usual, the lie detector test aids in the parents' final decision.
11	"The Scantlins"	February 8, 2003	111
Melana Scantlin's parents choose a date for their daughter from three eligible bachelors. They throw in a twist when they take the bachelors to a comedy club and make them perform comedy routines without any preparation.
12	"The Calderons"	March 3, 2003	112
The Calderon's are set to pick the perfect date for their son from three sets of twins.
13	"The Haegeles (Meet My Kids)"	March 10, 2003	113
Single mom Barbara Haegele's three grown sons choose a date to escort her on a trip to Hawaii in this expanded edition. Included: a football game between sons and suitors; secret tasks; and a lie-detector test.
14	"The Barnes"	March 11, 2003	114
Randy, Adam, and Tommy compete for a trip to Hawaii with Jaqui Barnes. One of the guys makes a really bad move, causing the parents and Jaqui to hate him, thus making him an easy first elimination. The second and final elimination is not so easy though, and the lie detector test doesn't prove too useful for the parents, so the dad makes up a test of his own.
15	"The Schmidts (Part 1)"	May 16, 2003	115
In part one of The Schmidts, five men compete for a trip to Australia with the swimsuit model Erin Schmidt. The contestants have a hard time winning over Erin's high school principal father, and two men are eliminated during the episode.
16	"The Schmidts (Part 2)"	May 23, 2003	116
It's down to Chris, Ryan, and Pete, and Martin and Robin Schmidt must decide who the winner is tonight. Several shocking facts make the decision hard, as the boys find out just how important it is to tell the truth and follow Dad's rules.
17	"The Dappers (Part 1)"	May 30, 2003	117
Five girls compete for a trip to Greece with the attractive college student Marco Dapper. The girls are shocked when their "bad facts" are revealed on Universal City Walk's jumbotron screen. Two girls are eliminated by the end of the episode
18	"The Dappers (Part 2)"	July 1, 2003	118
In part two, Chelsea, Ana, and Chauntal are left to compete for the trip to Greece with Marco. A rivalry grows between the girls and more secrets are revealed as Mom and Dad narrow it down to a winner.
19	"The Maniacis"	August 18, 2003	119
Mary and Bob Maniaci pick between Lisa, Daniella, and Desiree to determine who will win a trip to Hawaii with their son Giancarlo. Secrets run deep and emotions run high as the girls are put through the usual series of tests and obstacles.
20	"The Matulichs"	August 25, 2003	120
The Matulich's are set to pick the perfect date for their daughter.
