= The Marine (film series) =

The Marine series
- Directed by: John Bonito (1); Roel Reine (2); Scott Wiper (3); William Kaufman (4); James Nunn (5–6)
- Written by: Alan B. McElroy (1, 4); Michelle Gallagher; John Chapin Morgan (2); Scott Wiper (3); Declan O'Brien (3); Ed McHenry and Rory McHenry (5); Craig Walendziak (6)
- Produced by: Joel Simon (1); Michael Lake (2); Michael J. Luisi (3–6)
- Starring: John Cena (1); Ted DiBiase Jr. (2); The Miz (3–6); Summer Rae (4); Naomi, Maryse, Curtis Axel, Heath Slater, Bo Dallas (5); Becky Lynch, Shawn Michaels (6)
- Cinematography: David Eggby (1); Joost von Starrenburg (2); Ron Stannett (3); Mark Rutledge (4); Luke Bryant (5)
- Edited by: Dallas Puett (1,3); Michael Trent (2); Paul Martin Smith (4); Paul Harb (5)
- Music by: Don Davis (1); Trevor Morris (2); Robert Revell (3); Jeff Tymoschuk (4); Claude Foisy (5); Christian Wibe (6)
- Production companies: WWE Studios; 20th Century Studios (1,2); Pacific Film and Television Commission (1)
- Distributed by: 20th Century Studios (1–4); Sony Pictures Worldwide Acquisitions (5–6)
- Running time: 564 mins.
- Country: United States
- Language: English
- Budget: $24,000,000 (est.)

The Marine is a series of action films produced by WWE Studios starring various WWE wrestlers in the lead roles.

== Films ==
=== The Marine (2006) ===
The Marine is a 2006 American action film directed by John Bonito. The film stars John Cena, Robert Patrick and Kelly Carlson. It was produced by the films division of WWE, called WWE Studios, and distributed in the United States by 20th Century Fox.

=== The Marine 2 (2009) ===
The Marine 2 is a 2009 American thriller film directed by Roel Reiné, written by Christopher Borrelli and John Chapin Morgan, and produced by Michael Lake. The film stars Ted DiBiase Jr., Temuera Morrison, Lara Cox, Robert Coleby and Michael Rooker. It is the sequel to The Marine, starring John Cena. This was Ted DiBiase's film debut. The film was released on DVD and Blu-ray in the United States on December 29, 2009. The film was inspired by the Dos Palmas kidnappings.

=== The Marine 3: Homefront (2013) ===
The Marine 3: Homefront is a 2013 American action film starring Mike "The Miz" Mizanin and directed by Scott Wiper. The film was released on direct-to-DVD and Blu-ray in the United States on March 5, 2013. It is a stand-alone sequel to The Marine starring John Cena and The Marine 2, starring Ted DiBiase, Jr.

=== The Marine 4: Moving Target (2015) ===
The Marine 4: Moving Target is an American action film starring Mike "The Miz" Mizanin reprising his role from the previous film. It was the first WWE Studios film to include a Diva in Summer Rae. The film was released direct-to-DVD and Blu-ray on April 21, 2015.

=== The Marine 5: Battleground (2017) ===
The Marine 5: Battleground is an American action film starring Mike "The Miz" Mizanin reprising his role from the previous two films. It also starred Mizanin's wife Maryse Ouellet, Heath Slater, Curtis Axel, Bo Dallas and Naomi.

=== The Marine 6: Close Quarters (2018) ===
The Marine 6: Close Quarters is an American action film starring Mike "The Miz" Mizanin reprising his role from the previous three films. The sixth and final installment of the series, it also starred Shawn Michaels and Becky Lynch.

== Crew ==
| Occupation | Film | | | | | |
| Occupation | The Marine | The Marine 2 | The Marine 3: Homefront | The Marine 4: Moving Target | The Marine 5: Battleground | The Marine 6: Close Quarters |
|---|---|---|---|---|---|---|
| Director | John Bonito | Roel Reiné | Scott Wiper | William Kaufman | James Nunn | James Nunn |
| Producer(s) | Joel Simon; Vince McMahon | Michael Lake | Michael J. Luisi | Michael J. Luisi | Michael J. Luisi | Michael J. Luisi |
| Writer(s) | Alan B. McElroy; Michelle Gallagher | John Chapin Morgan; Christopher Borrelli | Scott Wiper; Declan O'Brien | Alan B. McElroy | Ed McHenry; Rory McHenry | Craig Walendziak |
| Composer | Don Davis | Trevor Morris | Robert Revell | Jeff Tymoschuk | Claude Foisy | Christian Wibe |
| Director of photography | David Eggby | Joost von Starrenburg | Ron Stannett | Mark Rutledge | Luke Bryant | Luke Bryant |
| Editor(s) | Dallas Puett | Michael Trent | Dallas Puett | Paul Martin Smith | Paul Harb | Charles Norris |

== Major characters ==
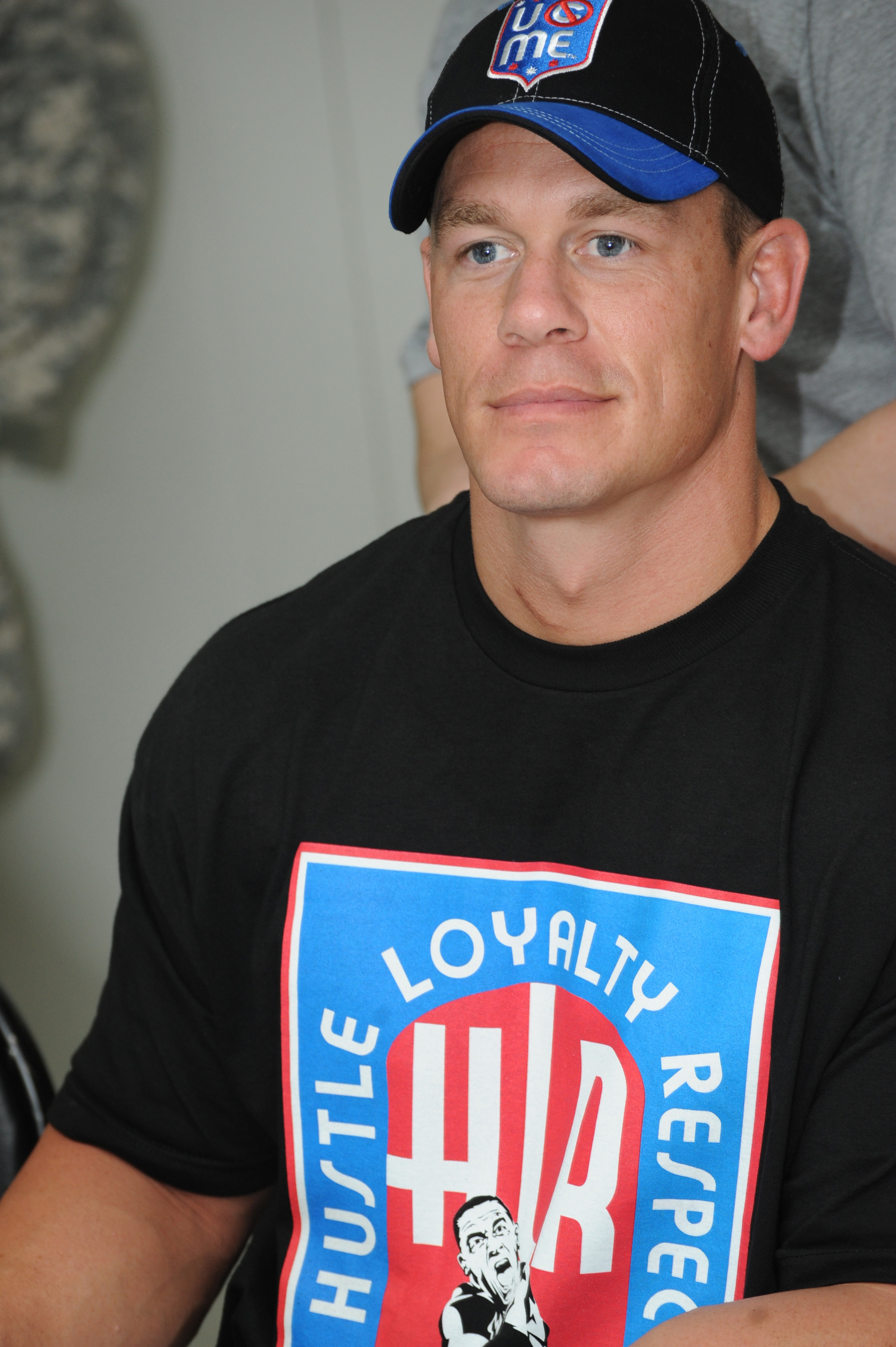
John Cena was the protagonist of the first movie

The Marine

- Sgt John Triton of the USMC is honorably discharged after ignoring orders from a superior during a mission in Iraq. He stops at nothing after his wife Kate is kidnapped at a gas station by Rome and his gang of jewelry thieves. He is portrayed by John Cena.
- Rome is a criminal mastermind and he and his gang of thieves rob a jewelry store and when being spotted by police at a gas station, he and his gang kidnap Kate Triton. He is portrayed by Robert Patrick.
- Kate Triton is the wife of John Triton who is kidnapped by Rome and his gang at a gas station. She is portrayed by Kelly Carlson.

The Marine 2

- Marine Scout Sniper Joe Linwood is vacationing with his wife in a Thailand resort when a terrorist group invades the hotel on its Grand Opening, taking everyone hostage. After escaping, Linwood stops at nothing to free the hostages, especially his wife. He is portrayed by Ted DiBiase Jr.
- Damo is the leader of a terrorist group who invades the Thailand resort on its opening night, taking everyone hostage. He is portrayed by Temuera Morrison.
- Robin Linwood is the wife of Joe Linwood who, along with many others, is taken hostage by Damo and his group. She is played by Lara Cox.

The Marine 3: Homefront

- Sgt. Jake Carter of the MARSOC returns home to a small town near Seattle after active duty. After his sister is kidnapped after witnessing a murder, he stops at nothing to get her back. He is portrayed by Mike "The Miz" Mizanin.
- Jonah Pope is the leader of a group of extremists who rob a bank in Seattle. He and his henchmen kidnap Lily after she witnesses him murder someone. He is played by Neal McDonough.
- Lily Carter is the younger sister of Jake Carter who, after witnessing him murder someone, is kidnapped by Jonah Pope and his group of extremists. She is portrayed by Ashley Bell.

The Marine 4: Moving Target

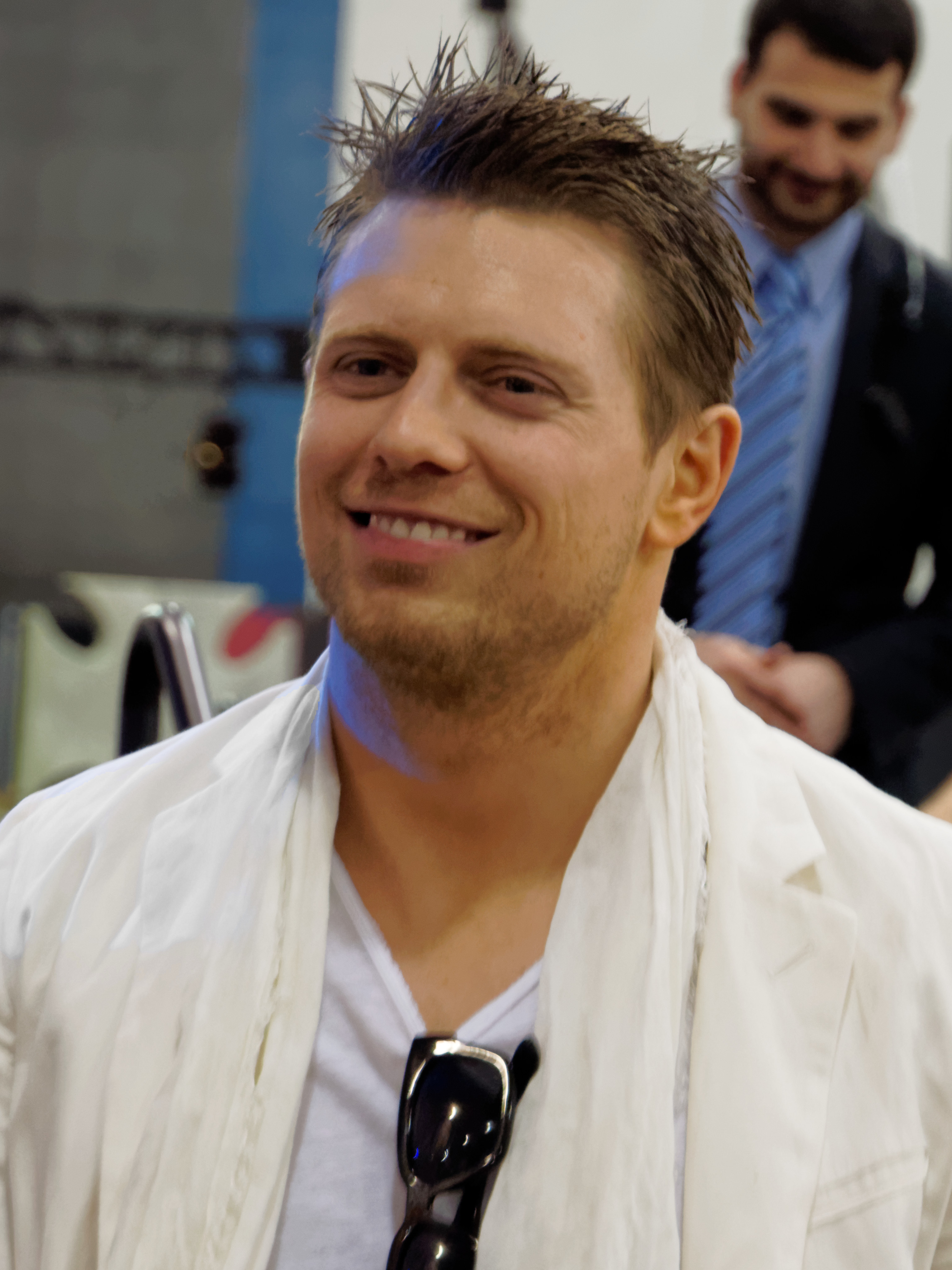
The Miz has starred in four of The Marine films

- Sgt. Jake Carter now working for a private security company after being honorably discharged from the USMC and has been assigned to protect a very high value package in the form of a beautiful woman. He stops at nothing to protect her after she tries to expose a corrupt military defense contractor. He is portrayed by Mike "The Miz" Mizanin and is the first character and actor to be featured in more than one Marine film.

The Marine 5: Battleground

- Now saving civilian lives stateside as an EMT, ex-Marine Jake Carter finds himself protecting an injured man from a ruthless biker gang. He stops at nothing to protect the man and utilizes his unique skills to stop the bikers’ rampage.

The Marine 6: Close Quarters

- EMT Jake Carter and another former Marine, Luke Trapper, join forces and stop at nothing to rescue a kidnapped girl from a gang of international criminals headed up by Maddy Hayes.

== Reception ==
Ratings collected from film review aggregation site Rotten Tomatoes.

| Film | Year | Rating |
|---|---|---|
| The Marine | 2006 | 17% |
| The Marine 2 | 2009 | —N/a |
| The Marine 3: Homefront | 2013 | —N/a |
| The Marine 4: Moving Target | 2015 | —N/a |
| The Marine 5: Battleground | 2017 | —N/a |
| The Marine 6: Close Quarters | 2018 | —N/a |
