= The Marine 5: Battleground =

2017 American action film

- DVD cover
- Directed by: James Nunn
- Screenplay by: Ed McHenry; Rory McHenry
- Produced by: Michael Luisi
- Starring: Mike "The Miz" Mizanin; Maryse Ouellet Mizanin; Curtis Axel; Heath Slater; Bo Dallas; Naomi
- Cinematography: Luke Bryant
- Edited by: Paul Harb
- Music by: Claude Foisy
- Production company: WWE Studios
- Distributed by: Sony Pictures Home Entertainment
- Release date: March 28, 2017
- Running time: 88 minutes

The Marine 5: Battleground is a 2017 American action film, directed by James Nunn. It is the fifth installment of The Marine film series and sees Mike "The Miz" Mizanin reprise his role from The Marine 3: Homefront and The Marine 4: Moving Target. This is the first film in the series to not be distributed by 20th Century Fox.

== Plot ==
Former convict Cole and his accomplice Taylor kill the gang leader Rodrigo in a drive-by shooting. The gang, hearing the shooting, rush out of the bar and shoots the truck, mortally wounding Taylor and injuring Cole as they drive away to the parking lot near the amusement park and makes an emergency call. Infuriated, the bikers begin to chase down the truck.

Meanwhile, former marine Jake Carter, now working as paramedic, with his partner Zoe, rescues a woman named Ana after a crane carrying bricks falls onto her car; she dies shortly due to loss of blood. As they depart, they receive a distress call coming from the parking lot.

They both arrive at the parking lot and find Cole and a dead Taylor, but three of the gang members arrive and intercept them. They attempt to escape in Cole's truck but the engine is destroyed by the gunshots and they escape. Another gang member, Alonzo, orders to surrender who shot Rodrigo or they will come to kill them. Deducing Cole to have lost a lot of blood, Zoe persuades Carter to stabilize his condition. As he heads back to the truck to retrieve the medical kit that was left behind, a gang member, Murphy intercepts him but Carter kills her, while Zoe creates a diversion to allow Cole to hide safely but she is knocked out and taken hostage by Deacon.

Two floors away, Alonzo holds Zoe at gunpoint, threatening to kill her if Carter doesn't surrender the man responsible. Carter uses Taylor's corpse as a decoy and presents him to Alonzo and Deacon, who release Zoe. After both gang members depart, thinking that the man solely responsible for Rodrigo's death is dead, Zoe calls out to Carter asking him to untie her hands. Alonzo and Deacon, anticipating that they could now get rid of both paramedics, shoot Zoe in the head, but Carter finds cover.

A leader figure Vincent arrives and Alonzo confirms the job as done but Vincent argues that there were two men. Alonzo then starts searching for the second man and calls for back-up. As Carter heads back to Cole, he is intercepted by Deacon. During the ensuing fight, Cole manages to inject him with morphine and Carter finishes him off with an axe and they hide in the elevator.

Carter interrogates Cole why the biker gang members are after him. Cole confesses that he did it in order to protect his five-year-old daughter and reveals that the motive was debt. The man who ordered the kill was one of the bikers.

After Carter kills another biker, they manage to escape from the parking lot. A shootout ensues at the park, apparently killing Carter. Cole gets traced down by Alonzo and he verbally tortures him. Cole points out that Vincent had forced him to kill Rodrigo and if not his family would be in danger. Vincent explains that Rodrigo was "weak" and made alliances with other gangs. A betrayed Alonzo brutally stabs Vincent, but Vincent's brother Cash stops him and himself stabs him multiple times to death, saying that he is doing it for the Lost Legion. Even then, he wanted to kill Cole. Recovering from his gunshot wounds, Carter rescues Cole in an ambulance, not before Carter and Cole kills the remaining bikers including Cash. They head to a construction site to call for medical assistance.

Alonzo locates them and brutally wounds Carter in a fist-fight while Cole makes it towards the rooftop. Alonzo confronts Cole but Carter appears and throws him off the building to his death. As they climb down the building, the medic teams arrive and treat Cole. Carter tells Cole that he will have to tell the police about the entire incident and that he will be going back to prison. Cole thanks Carter for saving his life and makes a statement that he can at least see his daughter grow up.

== Cast ==
- Mike "The Miz" Mizanin as Jake Carter
- Nathan Mitchell as Cole
- Anna Van Hooft as Zoe Williams
- Bo Dallas as Alonzo
- Curtis Axel as Deacon
- Heath Slater as Cash
- Naomi as Murphy
- Sandy Robson as Vincent
- Yusuf A. Ahmed as Taylor
- Mark Acheson as Rodrigo
- Maryse Ouellet Mizanin as Ana

== Production ==
Battleground was announced on May 27, 2016, with Mike "The Miz" Mizanin reprising his role as Jake Carter from previous installments of the franchise, and WWE talents Maryse is playing as Ana and Naomi as Murphy and Curtis Axel as Deacon, Heath Slater as Cash and Bo Dallas as Alonzo. The production began on May 31 in Vancouver, British Columbia.

== Release ==
=== Home media ===
The Marine 5: Battleground was released on DVD in 2015 in the UK. The film has not yet been released on Blu-ray.

== Sequel ==
The Marine 6: Close Quarters was announced on November 22, 2017, with Mizanin reprising his role as Jake Carter for the final time and fellow WWE superstars Becky Lynch and Shawn Michaels joining the cast.
