= The Marine 3: Homefront =

- Official DVD cover featuring Mike "The Miz" Mizanin
- Directed by: Scott Wiper
- Written by: Scott Wiper; Declan O'Brien
- Produced by: Michael Luisi
- Starring: Mike "The Miz" Mizanin; Neal McDonough; Michael Eklund; Ashley Bell; Camille Sullivan; Jared Keeso; Jeff C. Ballard
- Cinematography: Ron Stannett
- Edited by: Dallas Puett
- Music by: Robert Revell
- Production companies: WWE Studios (Homefront Productions, Inc.)
- Distributed by: 20th Century Fox Home Entertainment
- Release date: March 5, 2013
- Running time: 90 minutes
- Country: United States
- Language: English
- Budget: $1.5 million
- Box office: $5 million

The Marine 3: Homefront is a 2013 American action film starring Mike "The Miz" Mizanin and directed by Scott Wiper. The film was released on direct-to-DVD and Blu-ray in the United States on March 5, 2013. It is the third installment in The Marine film series and a sequel to The Marine, starring John Cena, and The Marine 2, starring Ted DiBiase Jr.

== Plot ==
Jake Carter, a Marine Corps Force Recon and MARSOC member, returns to his rural hometown of Bridgeton near Seattle, Washington. He reunites with his best friend Harkin, a police chief, and greets his sisters Lilly and Amanda, who throw him a homecoming party. Meanwhile, in Seattle, a regional bank is robbed by a syndicate led by Jonas Pope, who forces the bank manager to comply. They steal half the money and burn the rest. The syndicate resides in a junkyard outside of town, with plans for revenge through an explosion in the city.

Meanwhile, Jake talks to Amanda about her running the house, but they are interrupted by Lilly, who was about to leave with her boyfriend, Darren, in a bar. Jake, who dislikes Darren, follows them and later ends up in a fight with a redneck. Lilly sees the scene and leaves with Darren. Harkin, who also witnesses the fight, calls the police and gives Jake a warning ticket. Harkin warns him that he'll be arrested if he gets into a fight again. Moments later, Amanda arrives to pick him up and admits to Jake that she is in a relationship with Harkin. The next day, Lilly and Darren stop by the same junkyard in which the syndicate dwells, and the two later witness a commotion among Jonas Pope and a smuggler. Pope becomes furious and shoots the smuggler; he then orders his henchmen to seize the witnesses when he hears Lilly yell for help. Amanda, after hearing Lilly struggling over the phone, contacts Jake about Lilly's abduction, and Jake drives off to the junkyard, where he sneaks up on a henchman who dumps off the body of the smuggler. Jake hold him at gunpoint where the henchman reveals that the abductees were brought into an old ferry near the junkyard. When another henchman arrives, Jake physically overpowers them after they attempt to kill him. Jake then attacks another supposed henchman, who is revealed to be an FBI Agent before Special Agent Wells comes to his aid. Jake, joined by Harkin, is brought to the FBI and informs them that the syndicate does more than kidnapping but bombing the city with RDX (Research Department Explosive), a very capable explosive.

Jake is restricted by Wells when he plans to rescue the teens by himself; instead, Wells orders the SWAT team to storm the junkyard. Meanwhile, Lilly and Darren, struggling to escape, get help from a henchman who is actually an FBI Agent in disguise, Alec Simms; he leads them to a room and tells them to lock it until he returns. The SWAT team storms the base, but the syndicate overpowers them. Jake attempts to fight Wells, but Harkin stops him. Harkin dropped him off at the junkyard, and allowed him to fight the syndicate. Jake finishes them off one-by-one, but he gets a bone to pick with a henchman named Gabrie, whom he defeats.

The undercover FBI agent calling Wells is killed. Lilly and Darren separate while escaping, and Lilly is taken captive again. Wells receives a call from Pope saying an unarmed cop in a sedan must escort them downtown; if not, Lilly will die in 20 minutes. When the sedan arrives, Eckert, Pope's associate, kills the driver and wears his uniform. Jake meets Darren on the ferry; feeling guilty, Darren leads Jake to the sedan's location. Jake tries to rescue them but is stopped by Galen Jackson, Pope's ally, and the sedan speeds away. Pope warns Wells that he and Eckert should be alone, or Lilly dies. In the parking area, Jackson searches for Jake but is killed by Darren. After analyzing the map from Pope, Jake grabs a dirt bike to save the city, with Darren following him.

When Pope and Eckert reach the city, they are ambushed by the FBI. Pope activates the sedan bomb instead. Eckert is killed by an agent while Pope takes Lilly hostage, but Harkin and Jake corner him, leading to Pope's death. Lilly reveals the sedan bomb, prompting Jake to drive it to an abandoned site near the river to escape the explosion. Harkin, Lilly, and Amanda rescue him, and the two sisters hug him. Lilly is thrilled when Darren arrives, and they celebrate.

== Cast ==
- Mike "The Miz" Mizanin as Sergeant Jake Carter
- Neal McDonough as Jonas Pope who earned a Doctor of Philosophy from Seattle Pacific University and is an unusual extremist who hates bankers, insurers and fat cats.
- Michael Eklund as Eckert, Jonas's accomplice
- Ashley Bell as Lilly Carter, Jake's sister
- Camille Sullivan as Amanda Carter, Jake's sister
- Jared Keeso as Harkin, local police chief and Jake's friend
- Jeff C. Ballard as Darren Carlyle, Lily's boyfriend
- Steve Bacic as Agent Wells
- Ben Cotton as Galen Jackson, leader of a small militia group out of Billings, Montana
- Darren Shahlavi as Cazel, Jonas's accomplice
- Aleks Paunovic as Gabriel
- Nicola Anderson as Agent Thompson
- Sean Tyson as Murray/Agent Alec Simms

== Production ==
The Marine 3: Homefront is the sequel to The Marine starring John Cena and The Marine 2 starring Ted DiBiase, Jr. On February 25, 2012, WWE Studios announced a three film distribution deal with 20th Century Fox Home Entertainment and The Marine 3: Homefront was the first of that deal. 20th Century Fox handled the global distribution of the film on DVD, Video On Demand, and Online outlets. WWE Studios also used WWE's television and internet status to promote and market the film.

It was reported online that Randy Orton had been cast in the main role, Orton later tweeted to confirm it. A former Marine, Orton had already been cast in the lead role of The Marine 2 (2009), but after injuring his collarbone, he was replaced by Ted DiBiase. On April 3, 2012, it was reported that Randy Orton dropped out of the role because of his bad conduct discharge from the Marines in the late 1990s. Orton twice was absent without leave and disobeyed an order from a commanding officer. Orton's old Marine unit displayed public outrage of Randy being cast in the film due to his history. Orton later starred in the WWE Studios film The Condemned 2: Desert Prey.

On April 30, 2012, it was announced that Mike Mizanin would replace Orton as the lead in the film. On June 11, 2012, it was announced that Ashley Bell and Neal McDonough have joined the cast. Scott Wiper was in talks to direct the film and to write the script. Filming began in the June 2012 and was shot in Vancouver and Maple Ridge, British Columbia.

== Release ==
The Marine 3: Homefront was released on DVD and Blu-ray on March 5, 2013, where it grossed $3,384,892 on U.S. sales. It placed at #12 on the top DVD sales, and #15 on top Blu-ray sales.

== Reception ==
The Marine 3: Homefront gained mixed reviews from critics, a review from Pro Wrestling Torch.com stating, "although Marine 3 is not a good movie and Miz is miscast in the lead role, he did show some chops as an actor here and could definitely play a supporting role in future releases and not seem out of place. Unfortunately much like his current role in WWE, Miz is out of his element in Marine 3."

Another review from The Action Elite.com states: "The Miz is actually a very good and entertaining action star. I am surprised and impressed with his performance. The action is more grounded in reality than the original. The fights are brutal and fun to watch. If you need a nice change of pace, you will definitely enjoy The Marine 3. It is a very fast paced piece of action cinema that will get you pumped."

== Sequel ==
Filming for The Marine 4: Moving Target began in April 2014. The Miz was recast to reprise his role as Carter and was joined by WWE Diva Summer Rae as the first female wrestler to appear in a WWE Studios film.
