= The Marine 4: Moving Target =

- Official DVD cover
- Directed by: William Kaufman
- Written by: Alan B. McElroy
- Based on: Characters by: Scott Wiper; Declan O'Brien
- Produced by: Michael J. Luisi
- Starring: Mike "The Miz" Mizanin; Summer Rae; Melissa Roxburgh; Josh Blacker; Matthew MacCaull; Paul McGillion; Roark Critchlow; Craig Veroni
- Cinematography: Mark Rutledge
- Edited by: Paul Martin Smith
- Music by: Jeff Tymoschuk
- Production companies: WWE Studios (Marine 4 Films, Inc.)
- Distributed by: 20th Century Fox Home Entertainment
- Release date: April 21, 2015
- Running time: 90 minutes
- Country: United States
- Language: English
- Budget: $1.95 million

The Marine 4: Moving Target (also known as The Marine 4 and The Marine: Moving Target) is a 2015 American action film starring Mike "The Miz" Mizanin and Summer Rae. The film was directed by William Kaufman and it is the fourth installment in The Marine film series, and the second to star Mizanin. The film was released digitally on April 10, 2015 and released direct-to-DVD and Blu-ray on April 21, 2015.

== Plot ==
Jake Carter, a former U.S Marine, is now working at Hawthorne Global Security, a private security agency led by Robert Daniels. He and a few other men are waiting at the airport for the arrival of whistleblower Olivia "Liv" Tanis, an IT engineer who used to work for Genesis Defense Corporation, one of the largest defense contractors of the United States. Liv has intel on traitors inside Genesis, and they have been hired by the Department of Justice to protect Liv until she is taken into official custody.

While they are en route for Liv's custody, their convoy is ambushed by a group of mercenaries hired by the corrupt military on Genesis, led by South African mercenary Simon Vogel. The mercenaries kill Daniels and his men except for Jake, who takes Liv and escapes in the mercenaries' car. The duo head to a safe house.

Once there, Liv grabs Jake's gun and says she needs Jake's keys to go to the police station. Learning that one of the convoy might be a renegade, Jake is mistrusted because she doesn't know him but Jake asserts that if she goes alone, she will be ambushed. Jake convinces her that he is a former marine. Later, Nathan Miller and Ethan Smith, members of the Department of Justice, arrive at the safe house. Ethan suddenly shoots Nathan in the head after he tells the information of Simon Vogel and the incident. Ethan turns out to be working with Vogel. He then searches for Liv while putting Jake on gunpoint. Liv escapes the house as the alarm goes off, and Ethan is distracted, causing Jake and Ethan to fight. Whilst fighting, the group of mercenaries arrive at the house. Liv and Jake manage to outrun them using a boat.

After departing from the boat, they walk beside the stream, planning the next move. Liv still mistrusts Jake, so Jake states that the mercenaries will not stop until they manage to kill Liv. Still not convinced, Liv hits Jake on the head with a rock, knocking Jake out. Liv runs to the highway and hitchhikes a trailer truck to go to the nearest police station. Meanwhile, Jake recovers and follows the trail left by Liv. Jake sees a passing police car, which helps him locate the police station, where Liv is heading to.

At the police station, Liv complains that mercenaries are trying to kill her and is taken in custody. Shortly, Jake arrives at the police station and demands where she is. The police detective, Det. Paul Redman, who's trying to verify Jake's identity turns out to be talking to Ethan on the phone without knowledge of him working with the mercenaries, who tells him to keep Jake and Liv, both in custody till he arrives. The officers arrest both Jake and Liv. Ethan and the mercenaries arrive there. He goes inside the police station first, followed by an attack by the mercenaries, for which he was totally unprepared for. They then proceed to engage in a gunfight with the surviving officers. Jake and Liv obtain keys to the handcuffs from a dead officer. Jake then puts her somewhere safe and joins the gunfight. The four remaining officers including Redman are killed while trying to escape. The two manage to run from them but the mercenaries see them escape, ensuing a chase. The duo soon lose them, yet again.

Jake and Liv spend the night in the woods. The next morning, Jake calls Vogel on his phone upon their arriving at the woods. An extended shootout begins, killing all the mercenaries except Vogel. In the ensuing chaos, Ethan holds Liv captive but the latter breaks free, allowing Jake and Ethan to fight. As Ethan gains the upper hand, Liv shoots him in the head. Suddenly, Vogel shoots Jake in the shoulder, temporarily stunning him. Unbeknownst to Vogel, Liv was able to find enough signal and finishes uploading the information of the corrupt military team to a dozen of news sites. Vogel then hits her. Jake, now recovered, tackles Vogel, snaps his neck, and kills him.

A few days later, Liv states that six members of the Genesis Defense Corporation are being indicted for treason and conspiracy. Liv gives a brand new tuxedo to Jake due to Jake losing his previous one earlier. Liv kisses Jake and boards the plane nearby. Jake watches as the plane flies away.

== Cast ==
- Mike "The Miz" Mizanin as Jake Carter
- Melissa Roxburgh as Olivia Tanis, the whistleblower
- Josh Blacker as Simon Vogel, former South African Special Forces soldier and Mercenary Leader
- Matthew MacCaull as Ethan Smith, DOJ mole
- Summer Rae as Rachel Dawes, Vogel's accomplice
- Paul McGillion as Det. Redman
- Roark Critchlow as Nathan Miller, DOJ official
- Craig Veroni as Robert Daniels, team lead at Global Hawthorne Security

== Production ==
In February 2014, The Miz announced that he would reprise his role of Jake Carter in the third sequel to The Marine and would be co-starring with Summer Rae, who became the first ever WWE Diva to appear in a WWE Studios film. Filming started in April 2014 in Squamish, British Columbia and with principal photography ending in May 2014.

== Release ==
=== Home media ===
The Marine 4: Moving Target was only released on DVD in 2015 in the UK, and it has never been released on Blu-ray.

== Sequel ==
The fifth film The Marine 5: Battleground was announced with Mizanin reprising his role of Jake Carter. The cast features Mizanin's wife Maryse Ouellet, Heath Slater, Curtis Axel, Bo Dallas, and Naomi.
