= McHenry Brothers =

British film directors and screenwriters

The McHenry Brothers are Edward Alexander McHenry (born 25 August 1983) and Rory Patrick McHenry (born 14 July 1987), known professionally as the McHenry Brothers, are British film directors and screenwriters.

== Personal life ==
Edward and Rory are the eldest of four sons whose father, David McHenry is a production designer and mother, Maureen Bennett is an actress. Edward and Rory grew up in London and then Gloucestershire. They started collaborating on short films at a very young age and produced a trilogy of short films called A Baptism of Fire using action figures. Edward studied Fine Art at the Ruskin School of Drawing at Oxford University.

== Work ==
Their debut feature Jackboots on Whitehall, a World War II comedy with puppets starring Ewan McGregor, Rosamund Pike and Timothy Spall, premiered at the 64th Edinburgh International Film Festival in May 2010 and opened the 2010 London Raindance Film festival

In October 2010 the brothers completed The Commuter , a short film starring Dev Patel, Charles Dance, Ed Westwick and Pamela Anderson. The Commuter was shot in HD using the Nokia N8 smartphone

In 2016 they penned the action film The Marine 5: Battleground, for WWE Studios. It is the fifth installment of The Marine franchise and sees Mike "The Miz" Mizanin reprise his role as Jake Carter, now working as an EMT back stateside after fulfilling his duties in the Middle East. While responding to a call, Carter finds himself protecting a man from a biker gang ruthlessly trying to attack him. The film is set to be released in 2017.

== Awards and nominations ==
=== Won ===
- 2010 Sitges Film Festival 'Gertie' Award - "Best Animated Feature Film" - Jackboots On Whitehall

=== Nominated ===
- 2010 British Independent Film Awards - "Raindance Award" - Jackboots On Whitehall

=== Special mention ===
- 2010 Edinburgh International Film Festival - Best of British Category - Jackboots On Whitehall

== Filmography ==
- Jackboots on Whitehall (2010; a.k.a. Nazi Invasion: Team Europe)
- The Commuter (2010)
- The Marine 5: Battleground (2016)
