= The Condemned =

2007 action film by Scott Wiper

- Theatrical release poster
- Directed by: Scott Wiper
- Screenplay by: Scott Wiper; Rob Hedden
- Story by: Scott Wiper; Rob Hedden; Andrew Hedden
- Produced by: Joel Simon
- Starring: Steve Austin; Vinnie Jones; Robert Mammone; Tory Mussett; Manu Bennett; Madeleine West; Rick Hoffman
- Cinematography: Ross Emery
- Edited by: Derek Brechin
- Music by: Graeme Revell
- Production companies: WWE Films; Colossal Entertainment; New Wave Entertainment
- Distributed by: Lionsgate
- Release date: April 27, 2007 (United States)
- Running time: 113 minutes
- Countries: United States; Australia
- Language: English
- Budget: $20 million
- Box office: $8.6 million

The Condemned is a 2007 action film written and directed by Scott Wiper. The film stars Steve Austin, Vinnie Jones, Robert Mammone, Tory Mussett, Madeleine West and Rick Hoffman.

The film centers on ten convicts who are forced to fight each other to the death as part of an illegal game which is being broadcast to the public. The Condemned was filmed in Queensland, Australia. Fight choreography was coordinated by Richard Norton, who also stunt doubles for Jones on some scenes. A sequel titled The Condemned 2 starring Randy Orton was released in 2015.

The film was produced by WWE Films and distributed by Lionsgate on April 27, 2007. The film received negative reviews from critics and was a box office bomb, grossing $8.6 million against a $20 million budget.

== Plot ==
Jack Conrad awaits execution in a corrupt Salvadoran prison. He is "purchased" by a wealthy TV producer and transported to a deserted island in the South Pacific along with nine other condemned criminals from prisons around the world. They are "offered" the opportunity to avoid capital punishment by fighting to the death in an illegal game to be filmed and broadcast live over the Internet.

A bomb is placed on the ankle of every contestant, each featuring a 30-hour countdown timer, a failsafe that will set off the device, a tracking device, and a pin that will detonate the bomb after a 10-second delay. The winner will have the bomb removed and be given their freedom, along with a cash prize. Ian "Breck" Breckel, the TV show's creator and showrunner, is aiming for online ratings that equal or beat the latest Super Bowl reception of 40 million viewers.

As the broadcast progresses, FBI agents discover Conrad's real identity, Jack Riley, after a tip from one of Conrad's former classmates. Conrad is discovered to be a former Delta Force operative who was captured on a Black ops mission to El Salvador after bombing a building controlled by drug dealers. Conrad's girlfriend, Sarah, becomes aware of the situation and watches the show unfold at the local bar where she works.

As the contestants were dropped off on the island, there was a fatal mishap where Italian contestant Dominic Giangrasso fell on a dilapidated pier and was impaled by one of the beams. Ewan McStarley and Saiga team up to kill the competition, while Yasantwa uses her wiles to trick Bruggerman and Mackie into their deaths. Conrad manages to kill Raudsep and teams up with Paco, who was desperate to find his wife. After reuniting with Rosa, Paco is severely injured by McStarley and Saiga and is forced to watch them rape and kill Rosa. Conrad manages to pull Paco away, and after seeing the show's broadcast tower, he infiltrates it and calls Sarah, telling her the island's latitude before he is chased off by Baxter, Breckel's head of security.

McStarley and Saiga discover and kill Paco, then set him ablaze. Breckel's girlfriend, Julie, and his head of production, Goldman, begin to express disdain over the show. Yasantwa, discovered by McStarley and Saiga, is wounded as she sets off her own explosive inside a Japanese WW2 bunker, killing her. After seven contestants have already died, Conrad is left alone against McStarley and Saiga. He stabs Saiga, and McStarley flees. Eventually, a helicopter drops a shotgun down to McStarley, who uses it to hunt down Conrad. After Conrad falls into a stream, McStarley runs into the cameraman, and his armed guard dressed in ghillie suits while searching for Conrad, and kills them, picking up the guard's MP5 SMG.

When McStarley and Conrad meet again, Conrad ends up rolling over a cliff and into a stream to avoid being shot by McStarley's shotgun. Conrad is presumed dead, and McStarley is declared the winner. As McStarley is being driven to the control tower to collect his prize, Breckel hears that the FBI has sent SEALs to take him into custody. Goldman catches wind of it and threatens to blow the whistle, and Breck has Baxter kill him. After he meets McStarley and deactivates his bomb, he reneges on the cash prize while revealing that Breckel has fixed the game in McStarley's favor. Conrad is then discovered by Breck and Baxter, and Conrad kills Baxter as Breck flees.

McStarley takes an MP5 from a guard and kills the tech team in the building, one by one, despite not knowing that Breckel was abandoning them. When he corners Julie, Breckel's girlfriend, he is confronted by Conrad, who shoots him to death after McStarley talks briefly about his past in the military and how he was repeatedly raped whilst serving time in an African prison. Conrad grabs McStarley's two MP5s and chases down Breckel, who is fleeing the island in a helicopter. After emptying the two guns and firing at the helicopter, he is given McStarley's reactivated ankle bomb by Julie. Conrad throws it into the helicopter, and Breckel reaches for it; however, the helicopter explodes and crashes into a cliff, killing Breckel and bringing his vicious game to an end. Conrad then deactivates his own bomb.

Conrad is driven back to Sarah's home in Texas, a free man and reunited with her.

== Cast ==
- Steve Austin as Jack Conrad / Jack Riley, a highly trained Delta Force operative and contestant.
- Vinnie Jones as Ewan McStarley, a psychopathic British mercenary and contestant.
- Manu Bennett as Paco Pacheco, a Mexican criminal and contestant.
- Masa Yamaguchi as Go Saiga, a Japanese contestant.
- Emelia Burns as Yasantwa Adei, a Ghanaian contestant.
- Marcus Johnson as Kreston Mackie, an American drug dealer and contestant.
- Dasi Ruz as Rosa Pacheco, a Mexican criminal, contestant and Paco's wife.
- Andy McPhee as Helmut Bruggerman, a German contestant.
- Rai Fazio as Dominic Giangrasso, an Italian contestant.
- Rick Hoffman as "Goldie" Goldman, Breck's head production crewman.
- Robert Mammone as Ian "Breck" Breckel, a rogue Hollywood producer running the show.
- Tory Mussett as Julie, Breck's girlfriend and crew member.
- Sam Healy as Bella, a member of Breck's production crew.
- Madeleine West as Sarah Cavanaugh, Jack's girlfriend.
- Sullivan Stapleton as Brad Wilkins, a federal agent seeking to shut down Breck's show.
- Luke Pegler as Baxter, Breck's head of security.
- Angie Milliken as Donna Sereno, a television journalist.
- Christopher James Baker as Eddie C, a member of Breck's production crew.
- Neil Pigot as Wade Meranto, Wilkins' supervisor.
- Dominic Brancatisano as The Arab
- Nathan Jones as Petr Raudsep, an Estonian contestant.
- Lani Tupu as El Salvador warden.

== Soundtrack ==
The Condemned (Original Motion Picture Soundtrack)

Soundtrack album by Various artists
- Released: 24 April 2007
- Genre: Rock
- Length: 54:53
- Label: WWE Music Group

The Condemned (Original Motion Picture Soundtrack) was released on April 24, 2007. It was composed by Graeme Revell. It is exclusively available on the iTunes Store.

No.	Title	Artist	Length
1.	"Opening Titles (Score)"	Graeme Revell	3:33
2.	"Black Betty"	Spiderbait	3:27
3.	"Hands of Time"	Groove Armada	4:22
4.	"Umbrella"	Chymera	7:23
5.	"This Colorful World"	Eliot Morris	4:45
6.	"You Say"	Aya Peard	5:01
7.	"Casino (Solid State Remix)"	Tommi Eckhardt	5:44
8.	"To Be Young (Is to Be Sad, Is to Be High)"	Ryan Adams	3:04
9.	"The Island and Conrad (Score)"	Graeme Revell	3:58
10.	"Souljacker, Pt. 1"	Eels	3:15
11.	"Over & Under"	Egypt Central	3:01
12.	"Unbreakable"	Cage9	3:15
13.	"I Won't Do What You Tell Me (Josh Wink Remix)"	Josh Wink	3:55
Total length:			54:53

Additional tracks

Other songs featured in the film, but not included on the soundtrack:

- "You Don't Know" by Eminem, 50 Cent, Lloyd Banks & Cashis
- "Lonely Train" by Black Stone Cherry
- "In the Air Tonight" by Phil Collins
- "Out of Line" by Buckcherry
- "Backwoods Gold" by Black Stone Cherry
- "Driven" by Sevendust
- "Bullet with a Name" by Nonpoint
- "Shooting Star" by Black Stone Cherry
- "Soulcrusher" by Operator
- "Firestarter" by The Prodigy
- "Savin' Me" by Nickelback

== Release ==
=== Critical response ===
Reviews of The Condemned included complaints of plot holes, overly preachy tone, lack of plot progression, hypocritical morals and poor fight choreography. As of April 2020, Rotten Tomatoes listed the film with a 16% rating, based on 99 reviews. The site's consensus stated: "The Condemned is a morally ambiguous, exceedingly violent and mostly forgettable action film." As of April 2020, Metacritic gave the film a score of 23 Out of 100, indicating "generally unfavorable reviews". Audiences polled by CinemaScore gave the film an average grade of "C+" on an A+ to F scale.

V.A. Musetto of the New York Post gave the film zero stars out of four, describing it as a "sickeningly violent and inane movie" and complaining that it is a bad rip-off of Battle Royale and The Most Dangerous Game.

One of the few positive reviews came from Michael Booth of The Denver Post. He described the concept as "The Truman Show meets Con Air" and makes positive notes about the reality television aspects of the story, although he cautions readers not to expect "high art" based on the 3 star rating he gives the film.

=== Box office ===
The film debuted with a $3.8 million opening weekend in the US. The film lasted only 4 weeks in theaters and posted a big loss, closing with a total of $7,371,706. The movie fared worse internationally, taking only $1,271,152 in limited foreign markets, for a total of $8,642,858.

=== Home media ===
On September 18, 2007, The Condemned was released on DVD and Blu-ray. Opening at number four, The Condemned brought in $6.5 million in the first week. Overall, it has sold an estimated 1.185 million DVD units earning $22.7 million. The DVD made its release in the United Kingdom on March 24, 2008, with a rating of 18 (Contains Strong Violence and Language). This was a straight to DVD release in the United Kingdom.

== Sequel ==
A sequel titled The Condemned 2 starring Randy Orton was released on November 6, 2015.

== See also ==
- Cinema of Australia
