= The Marine 6: Close Quarters =

- DVD cover
- Directed by: James Nunn
- Screenplay by: Craig Walendziak
- Produced by: Michael Luisi
- Starring: Mike "The Miz" Mizanin; Shawn Michaels; Becky Lynch
- Cinematography: Luke Bryant
- Edited by: Charles Norris
- Music by: Christian Wibe
- Production company: WWE Studios
- Distributed by: Sony Pictures Home Entertainment
- Release date: November 13, 2018
- Running time: 85 minutes

The Marine 6: Close Quarters is a 2018 American action film produced by WWE Studios and directed by James Nunn. It is the sixth and final installment of The Marine film series. Mike "The Miz" Mizanin returned to star in the series for the fourth time, alongside fellow WWE wrestlers Shawn Michaels and Becky Lynch.

== Plot ==
In a park, a young girl named Sarah Dillon is kidnapped by Irish criminal Maddy Hayes. Maddy calls Sarah's father, Patrick, a juror, and she threatens to kill Sarah if Patrick doesn't force a mistrial on her father, Horace, who is on trial in a court case.

Meanwhile, former US Marines, Jake Carter and Luke Trapper, later meet up with a man named Graham at a disused brewery. They hear a scream inside and bust into the room where it came from, where they encounter Maddy and her henchmen holding Sarah hostage. Graham wanders in, and ends up getting killed by Maddy. Jake and Luke get into various fights with the henchmen throughout the brewery as they try to rescue Sarah, while Patrick struggles with settling on his verdict for Horace.

Jake, Luke and Sarah are later confronted by more henchmen in an underground tunnel system and are eventually pinned down. Jake is shot and fatally wounded in the chaos, while Maddy snatches Sarah back. Trusting Luke to rescue Sarah, Jake sacrifices himself by running toward the henchmen, killing as many as he can, taking many hits. Maddy bids Jake farewell and throws a knife into his heart, killing him.

Luke follows Maddy and her remaining men outside towards a boat. Maddy learns that the mistrial has been confirmed, which then makes Sarah a loose end. Luke kills the remaining henchmen on land, and jumps onto the boat, where he kills her last henchman. Luke and Maddy then engage in hand-to-hand combat, and Luke manages to overpower Maddy with a rope and throw her overboard. An anchor connected to the rope later falls into the water, forcing Maddy to become submerged in the water and drown. Police and paramedics show up and Sarah reunites with Patrick who guarantees that Horace will be put to justice. Luke says his final goodbyes to Jake; his corpse is escorted away by paramedics. The film ends with a tribute to Jake Carter, showing everything he did throughout the franchise.

== Cast ==
- Mike "The Miz" Mizanin as Jake Carter
- Shawn Michaels as Luke Trapper
- Becky Lynch as Maddy Hayes
- Louisa Connolly-Burnham as Sarah Dillon
- Terence Maynard as Shawn Taylor
- Tim Woodward as Tommy Walker
- Martyn Ford as Oscar Hayes
- Anna Demetriou as Katrina Rodriguez
- Michael Higgs as Graham Torrence
- Daniel Adegboyega as Lewis Rooney
- Alec Newman as Patrick Dillon
- Hester Ruoff as Kelly
- David William Bryan as Ben
- Ellie Goffe as Kind Juror
