= Frank Mannion =

Irish film producer, based in London

Frank Mannion is an Irish film producer, based in London.

Since 2002, he has run the film production company, Swipe Films.

He has produced or executive produced:

- Mad Cows starring Joanna Lumley, Anna Friel, Mohamed Al Fayed, Jodie Kidd & Sophie Dahl
- Divorcing Jack starring David Thewlis, Rachel Griffiths & Jason Isaacs
- Grand Theft Parsons starring Johnny Knoxville & Christina Applegate
- In Prison My Whole Life with Colin Firth, Mumia Abu Jamal, Mos Def, Noam Chomsky, Snoop Dogg & Steve Earle (international sales agent)
- Reverb (film) starring Leo Gregory and Eva Birthistle
- Flourish (film) starring Jennifer Morrison and Leighton Meester
- Jackboots on Whitehall starring Ewan McGregor, Richard E. Grant, Rosamund Pike & Tom Wilkinson

He has an LL.B. from Trinity College Dublin and an LL.M. from Trinity Hall Cambridge. In 2023, Mannion was awarded a PhD from Birmingham City University in Film Distribution and is currently a Senior Lecturer in entrepreneurship and film.
