= The Big Ugly (film) =

2020 drama action film

- Theatrical release poster
- Directed by: Scott Wiper
- Screenplay by: Scott Wiper
- Story by: Scott Wiper; Paul Tarantino
- Produced by: Scott Wiper; Vinnie Jones; Tarquin Pack; Karri O'Reilly; Michael Downey
- Starring: Vinnie Jones; Malcolm McDowell; Ron Perlman; Nicholas Braun; Leven Rambin; Lenora Crichlow; Brandon Sklenar; Elyse Levesque; Bruce McGill
- Cinematography: Jeremy Osbern
- Edited by: Jordan Downey
- Music by: Alex Heffes
- Production companies: Endeavor Content; 4G Vision
- Distributed by: Vertical Entertainment
- Release date: July 24, 2020
- Running time: 106 minutes
- Country: United States
- Language: English
- Budget: $6 million
- Box office: $515,399

The Big Ugly is a 2020 American crime action film directed by Scott Wiper, who wrote the screenplay with Paul Tarantino. The film story follows a London mob boss (Malcolm McDowell) who sends a henchman Neelyn (Vinnie Jones) to West Virginia to set up a money laundering operation with an oilman (Ron Perlman). But Neelyn's girlfriend (Lenora Crichlow) disappears, and Neelyn is out for revenge. The film was released on July 24, 2020, and received mixed reviews from critics.

== Plot ==
Harris is a London crime boss, with Neelyn as his main enforcer. They fly to West Virginia after Harris strikes a deal with an old and valued friend, an American oilman named Preston. Stakes are high with Preston genuinely concerned with keeping his operation environmentally clean. Contracts are signed and festivities are held. Preston’s son PJ is overconfident and behaves as though entitled to take a crack at any girl he sees. Late that night Neelyn's girlfriend of six years Fiona, disappears. Neelyn refuses to leave for England without her and finds her dead with PJ as the main suspect. Neelyn has to discard his ties with friends and family, risking the oil contract and the friendship between his boss and Preston, to find retribution and the truth.

== Cast ==
- Vinnie Jones as Neelyn, an enforcer for Harris
- Malcolm McDowell as Harris, a British crime boss
- Ron Perlman as Preston, a local oil baron
- Nicholas Braun as Will, Preston's foreman
- Leven Rambin as Kara
- Lenora Crichlow as Fiona, Neelyn's girlfriend
- Brandon Sklenar as Junior, Preston's son
- Elyse Levesque as Jackie
- Bruce McGill as Milt, Preston's right-hand man

== Production ==
Filming took place over six weeks in Morehead, Kentucky, Owingsville, Kentucky, and Olive Hill, Kentucky during the summer of 2018. Wiper originally intended to shoot the film in his home state of Ohio, but could not receive the proper tax incentives to convince the producers. Perlman said he knew he would be starring in the film by the time he reached page 11 of the script.

== Release ==
The Big Ugly was released in limited theaters (mostly drive-ins) in the United States on July 24, 2020, and then made available via video-on-demand on July 31.

The film made $152,468 from 68 theaters in its opening weekend.

== Reception ==
On review aggregator Rotten Tomatoes, the film holds an approval rating of 41% based on 22 reviews, with an average rating of 5.6/10. On Metacritic, the film has a weighted average score of 52 out of 100, based on seven critics, indicating "mixed or average" reviews.

Leslie Felperin of The Guardian gave the film 2 out of 5 stars, saying that it "plays like several plots, genres and mood boards all mashed together, which makes the end result interesting but not entirely successful." Writing for Time Out, Phil de Semlyen also gave the film 2 out of 5 and wrote: "You can tell roughly where The Big Ugly is going right from those opening exchanges: people are going to get punched, booze will be slugged back, and there will be some lads' mag philosophising about blood oaths and the bonds of brotherhood. Then more people will be punched. Amid all this, female characters will stand around wondering why they're so one-dimensional."
