= A Better Way to Die =

- Directed by: Scott Wiper
- Written by: Scott Wiper; Jack Conley; Carmen Argenziano
- Produced by: Scott Wiper
- Distributed by: Newmarket
- Release date: 2000
- Running time: 96 minutes
- Country: United States
- Language: English

A Better Way to Die is a 2000 action and thriller film. It was directed and produced by Scott Wiper. The film centers on a Chicago cop who quits the force and finds himself threatened by the Mafia.

== Cast ==
- Andre Braugher as Cleveland
- Natasha Henstridge as Kelly
- Scott Wiper as Boomer
- Jack Conley as Fletcher
- Carmen Argenziano as Carlos
- Richard Haje as The Mute
- Mo Gallini as Laslov (as Matt Gallini)
- Rolando Molina as Chach
- Kirk McKinney as Spaz
- Jefferson Moore as Harrison James
- Wayne Duvall as Rifkin
- Lou Diamond Phillips as William Dexter
