= The Marine 2 =

- Official DVD cover
- Directed by: Roel Reiné
- Written by: Christopher Borrelli; John Chapin Morgan
- Produced by: Michael Lake
- Starring: Ted DiBiase Jr.; Temuera Morrison; Lara Cox; Robert Coleby; Michael Rooker
- Cinematography: Joost van Starrenburg
- Edited by: Michael Trent
- Music by: Trevor Morris
- Production companies: WWE Studios (Marine 2 Productions, Inc.)
- Distributed by: 20th Century Fox Home Entertainment
- Release date: December 29, 2009
- Running time: 95 minutes
- Country: United States
- Language: English
- Budget: $1.5 million

The Marine 2 is a 2009 American action film directed by Roel Reiné, written by Christopher Borrelli and John Chapin Morgan, and produced by Michael Lake. The film stars Ted DiBiase Jr., Temuera Morrison, Lara Cox, Robert Coleby and Michael Rooker. It is a standalone sequel to The Marine, which starred John Cena, and the second installment in The Marine film series. This was Ted DiBiase's film debut. The film was released on DVD and Blu-ray in the United States on December 29, 2009.

The film was inspired by the Dos Palmas kidnappings.

The film was produced by the film division of WWE, called WWE Studios, and distributed in the United States by 20th Century Fox Home Entertainment.

== Plot ==
Joe Linwood of the US Marine Force Recon attempts to rescue his wife, Robin and other guests from a hotel that has been taken over by terrorists. The Linwoods are vacationing at a lavish Thailand resort when the terrorists invade during the hotel's grand opening. Joe escapes the initial onslaught and must find a way to save his wife and the other hostages.

== Cast ==
- Ted DiBiase Jr. as Joe Linwood
- Temuera Morrison as Damo, terrorist leader
- Lara Cox as Robin Linwood, Joe's wife
- Robert Coleby as Darren Conner, billionaire
- Michael Rooker as Church, US Army veteran
- Kelly B. Jones as Cynthia
- Sahajak Boonthanakit as Shoal, corrupt government official
- Dom Hetrakul as Calob
- Marina Ponomareva as Lexi
- Levern Gibbs as Spotter
- Tsyun Malherbe as Young Tourist
- Able Wanamakok as Reporter on TV
- Thienchai Jayasvasit as Thickset
- Kawee Sirikanaerut as Bantoc
- Pongsanart Vinsiri as Military Commander
- Supoj Khaowwong as Blondie

== Production ==
=== Casting ===
WWE wrestler and real-life former Marine Randy Orton was set to play the lead role. He had to decline due to a collarbone injury.

== Sequel ==
A sequel, The Marine 3: Homefront, was released on March 5, 2013. It stars WWE wrestler Mike "The Miz" Mizanin in the lead role. Randy Orton was initially cast in the lead role; however, due to his previous negative association with the Marine Corps, he was replaced by Mizanin.
