= Jackboots on Whitehall =

- UK theatrical release poster
- Directed by: The McHenry Brothers
- Written by: The McHenry Brothers
- Story by: The McHenry Brothers
- Produced by: Patrick Scoffin; Karl Richards; Frank Mannion
- Starring: Ewan McGregor; Rosamund Pike; Alan Cumming; Timothy Spall; Tom Wilkinson; Sanjeev Bhaskar; Richard E. Grant; Pam Ferris; Richard O'Brien; Richard Griffiths; Hugh Fraser; Tobias Menzies; Stephen Merchant; Dominic West
- Cinematography: Michael Connor
- Edited by: Chris Blunden
- Music by: Guy Michelmore
- Production companies: Vertigo Films; Matador Pictures; Entertainment Motion Pictures (E-MOTION); McHenry Pictures
- Distributed by: Vertigo Films
- Release dates: 20 June 2010 (EIFF); 8 October 2010
- Running time: 91 minutes
- Country: United Kingdom
- Language: English
- Budget: $6 million
- Box office: $20,776

Jackboots on Whitehall (a.k.a. Nazi Invasion: Team Europe) is a 2010 British adult animated/puppet satirical action comedy film set in an alternative history Second World War, in which Nazi Germany has seized London. The British must band together at Hadrian's Wall if they are to thwart the German invasion. Conceived by Edward and Rory McHenry, it is the first of its kind to feature animatronic puppets and the voices of well-known British actors including Ewan McGregor, Rosamund Pike, Richard E. Grant, Timothy Spall, Richard O'Brien and Richard Griffiths. The film was executive produced by Frank Mannion.

The film premiered at the Edinburgh International Film Festival on 20 June 2010 and was theatrically released in the United Kingdom on 8 October 2010 by Vertigo Films. It received mixed reviews from critics. The cast, set design and voice acting received praised but The Guardian described the film as "desperately weak in terms of script".

== Plot ==
In 1940, Nazi Germany invades Great Britain by drilling under the English Channel and up through the cobblestones on Whitehall, London. From his bunker under Downing Street, 200 yards (180 m) away, Prime Minister Winston Churchill issues a call to arms for all of Britain to band together to resist the invaders. In a small village, Chris, a young everyman, rallies the residents to fight back. Joining forces with Churchill's small group of soldiers, the resistance movement retreats to Hadrian's Wall, where the unlikely saviours of the country come from the Scottish Highlands. The Scots, lead by Braveheart, drive off the Nazis, sending them back across the channel, but carry on the occupation of London, claiming the british throne and proclaiming the Scottish Empire.

== Cast ==
As appearing in Jackboots on Whitehall, (main speaking roles and screen credits identified):

- Ewan McGregor as Chris
- Rosamund Pike as Daisy
- Richard E. Grant as The Vicar
- Timothy Spall as Winston Churchill
- Tom Wilkinson as Albert and Joseph Goebbels
- Dominic West as Billy Fiske
- Alan Cumming as Adolf Hitler and Braveheart
- Sanjeev Bhaskar as Major Rupee
- Richard Griffiths as Hermann Göring
- Richard O'Brien as Heinrich Himmler
- Stephen Merchant as Tom
- Pam Ferris as Matron Rutty
- Hugh Fraser as Gaston and the Newsreader
- Tobias Menzies as Captain English and Bernard Montgomery
- Martyn Ellis as Zeppelin Captain
- Alexander Armstrong as Red Leader
- Rory McHenry as Johnny
- Caroline Duff as F.A.N.Y Girl 1
- Charlotte Moore as F.A.N.Y Girl 2
- James Hicks as Igor / Joseph Kaplinsky / Farmer 1 / Skinny Guard / Scottish Savages
- Brian Conley as Zeppelin Crewman / Farmer 2 / Stupid Farmer / Erummel / Squire / Hereford Farmer
- Jimmy Boyle as Pinkypoo
- Edward McHenry as Charlie/Rat Catcher
- Benedick Blythe as German Soldiers
- Stephen Lord as Yorkshire Farmer
- Jonathan Barlow as Scottish Savages
- Jana Agnew as Nazi Girls
- Karl Richards as Camp Nazis
- Mark Taylor as Camp Nazis
- Neil Newbon as Tank Driver

In using real-life characters to embody a more accurate portrayal, some characters are easily recognizable. While Battle of Britain hero and American pilot Billy Fiske appears, he embodies the characteristics of screen legend Clark Gable. Spall had previously portrayed Churchill in The King's Speech (2010).

== Production ==
The characters were sculpted accurately to portray real historical figures and the models of military equipment and weapons were likewise realistic.

Writer-directors Edward and Rory McHenry created several supermarionation puppets that featured accurately rendered period uniforms, architecture and military equipment.

== Theatrical release and premiere ==
Jackboots on Whitehall was released in cinemas on 8 October 2010 in the United Kingdom by Vertigo Films and premiered on 20 June 2010 at the EIFF.

== Critical reception ==
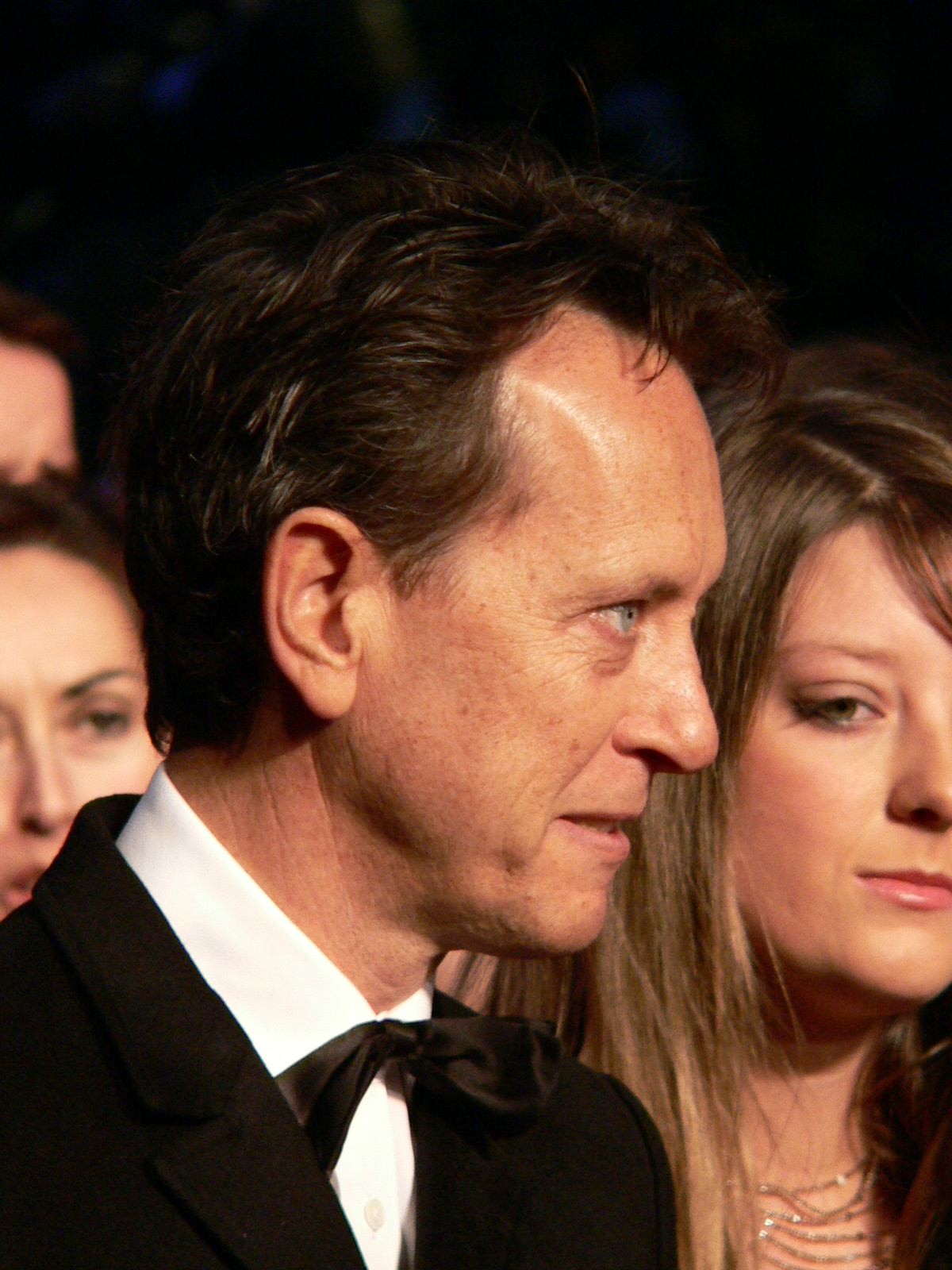
Richard E. Grant was praised for his performance.

Robbie Collin, of the News of the World, gave the film 4 stars summarising it as "Stupid, throwaway nonsense – and that's the whole idea".Total Film magazine also gave the film 4 stars stating "Jackboots wittily merges war flick iconography, Inglorious revisionism and Team America silliness to create a hilarious, endearing one-off".

The Guardian praised the "impressive all-star vocal cast" in Jackboots on Whitehall, and called it a "labour of love" by its writer-directors, but concluded it was "amiably intentioned but desperately weak in terms of script" comparing it unfavourably with Wallace and Gromit and Team America: World Police. Other reviews were of a similar nature; the review in The Telegraph characterized the film as "an enterprising comedy but ultimately a boorish overkill."

== Box office ==
The film grossed $20,776 worldwide.

== Home media ==
Jackboots on Whitehall was released on DVD and Blu-ray on 26 July 2011 by Sony Pictures Home Entertainment.

== Awards ==
List of awards and nominations
Award	Category	Nominee
British Independent Film Awards 2010	Raindance Award	Nominated

== Soundtrack ==
Jackboots on Whitehall

Soundtrack album by Guy Michelmore
- Released: 10 August 2010
- Recorded: 2010
- Genre: Film score
- Length: 64:45
- Label: MovieScore Media
- Producer: Mikael Carlsson

All music was composed by Guy Michelmore.

- Battle Of Britain
- Harvest And Village
- Nazi Airship Attack
- Punjabi's Last Stand
- Light The Beacons
- Last Of The Few
- Retreat To Scotland
- Battle Of Downing Street
- Chris To The Rescue
- Freedom
- Nazis In London
- Travelling North
- Punjabi's Escape From London
- Hadrian's Wall
- Aurora Borealis
- Where Is Herr Churchill?
- The Morning After
- A Highland Morning
- Chris' Mission
- Facing The Enemy
- Jerusalem - Performed by Rosamund Pike, Tom Wilkinson, Stephen Merchant, Sanjeev Bhaskar, Pam Ferris and Cast
- Defending The Wall
- The Battle
- Facing Defeat
- Scottish Attack
- You're A Scotsman
- The Fallen
- Rule Britannia
- Scots Revenge
- Whitehall March
- Scotland The Brave
- Jackboots Demo

== See also ==
- Hypothetical Axis victory in World War II
- Operation Sea Lion
- One Hundred Years of Evil
