= Scott Wiper =

American film director, writer and actor

- Born: July 22, 1970 (age 55); Granville, Ohio

Scott Wiper (born July 22, 1970) is an American writer, film director, and actor. He grew up in northeast Ohio and graduated from Wesleyan University in 1992, then moved to Los Angeles to start making his first movie.

He wrote, directed, and starred in A Better Way to Die. Wiper was also the co-writer and director of the action thriller, The Condemned, starring WWE's "Stone Cold" Steve Austin. Wiper wrote the screenplay for The Cold Light of Day, starring Henry Cavill, Bruce Willis and Sigourney Weaver. He also directed the WWE Film The Marine 3: Homefront starring WWE wrestler The Miz. In 2020, Wiper wrote and directed The Big Ugly, which was the first film to shoot using the RED Gemini camera.

== Filmography ==
- The Big Ugly (2020) - Director, writer, producer
- The Marine 4: Moving Target (2015) - characters
- The Marine 3: Homefront (2013) - writer, director
- The Cold Light of Day (2012) - writer
- The Condemned (2007) - writer, director
- Jolly Good Fellow (2006) - actor
- Landspeed (2002) - actor
- Pearl Harbor (2001) - actor
- A Better Way to Die (2000) - writer, director, actor
- The Last Marshal (1999) - writer
- Captain Jack (1996) - writer, director, producer, editor, actor
- The Return of Wes Lauren (1992) - writer, director, producer, editor, actor
