= David Eggby =

English cinematographer (born 1950)

David Eggby A.C.S.
- Born: 1950 (age 75–76); London, England
- Occupation: Cinematographer
- Years active: 1975–2019

David Eggby, A.C.S. (born 1950) is an English-born Australian cinematographer.

== Early life and career ==
Eggby was born in 1950 in London, but has lived in Melbourne since childhood.

Beginning his career as a photographer for the Royal Australian Navy, Eggby then moved on to work for Australian television production company Crawford Productions, working on such shows as Homicide and Matlock Police, until he broke into the industry with the low budget action film Mad Max.

== Filmography ==
=== Film ===
Year	Title	Director
1979	Mad Max	George Miller
1980	Dead Man's Float	Peter Sharp
1982	Early Frost	Brian McDuffie
1983	At Last... Bullamakanka: The Motion Picture	Simon Heath
1983	Buddies	Arch Nicholson
1984	The Slim Dusty Movie	Rob Stewart
1985	The Naked Country	Tim Burstall
1988	Kansas	David Stevens
1989	Warlock	Steve Miner
1989	The Blood of Heroes	David Peoples
1990	Quigley Down Under	Simon Wincer
1991	Harley Davidson and the Marlboro Man	Simon Wincer
1992	Fortress	Stuart Gordon
1993	Dragon: The Bruce Lee Story	Rob Cohen
1994	Lightning Jack	Simon Wincer
1996	Dragonheart	Rob Cohen
1996	Daylight	Rob Cohen
1999	Virus	John Bruno
1999	Blue Streak	Les Mayfield
2000	Pitch Black	David Twohy
2002	Scooby-Doo	Raja Gosnell
2003	Horseplay	Stavros Kazantzidis
2004	EuroTrip	Jeff Schaffer
2005	Racing Stripes	Frederik Du Chau
2006	The Marine	John Bonito
2007	Underdog	Frederik Du Chau
2008	The Secret of Moonacre	Gábor Csupó
2011	Ironclad	Jonathan English
2013	Riddick	David Twohy
2017	2:22	Paul Currie

Ref.:

=== Television ===
Year	Title	Director	Notes
1977	Bluey	George T. Miller	Episode "The Mooball Man"
1994	Halfway Across the Galaxy and Turn Left	Brendan Maher	Episodes "Strange Encounters" and "Growing Up Quick"
1995	Space: Above and Beyond	David Nutter	Episode "Pilot"

Miniseries

Year	Title	Director	Notes
1985	A Thousand Skies	David Stevens	
1986	Dream West	Dick Lowry	With Robert M. Baldwin and Jack Wallner
1993	The Tommyknockers	John Power	With Dan Burstall

TV movies

Year	Title	Director
1976	Me & Mr Thorne	Paul Eddey
1981	Homicide Squad	Bob Meillon
1986	Charley's Web	Simon Heath
1992	Survive the Savage Sea	Kevin James Dobson
1995	Kansas	Robert Mandel
1998	The Echo of Thunder	Simon Wincer
2000	Rip Girls	Joyce Chopra
2000	Stepsister from Planet Weird	Steve Boyum
2001	Crossfire Trail	Simon Wincer
2003	Monte Walsh	Simon Wincer
