= Lara Cox =

Australian actress

- Born: Lara Jane Cox; 6 March 1978 (age 48); Canberra, Australia
- Occupation: Actress
- Years active: 1996–present

Lara Jane Cox (born 1978) is an Australian actress, known for a variety of roles. Cox played the role of Anita Scheppers in Heartbreak High, Doctor Denman in H2O: Just Add Water, and has appeared in Voodoo Lagoon and Kangaroo Jack.

She guest-starred in Home and Away playing intern Dr. Marie during the "Hospital Stalker" storyline. She also starred as Finn in the final season of The Lost World. In 2009 she starred in the thriller The Dinner Party. In 2017, she took over the role of Quinn Jackson on Home and Away. The character returned after 22 years, being played by Danielle Spencer in 1995. Quinn is the daughter of Alf Stewart. She played Robin Linwood in action film The Marine 2.

She has done a television commercial for Lunesta (sleep aid drug) in the US, and is in an Australian television commercial for Hahn Super Dry.

== Early life ==
Cox was born in Canberra. She attended Daramalan College and Menai College. She was a model before she became an actress.

== Filmography ==
=== Film ===
Year	Title	Role	Type
2000	Angst	Heather	Feature film
2002	Diagnosis Narcolepsy	Farmer Jo-Ann	Short film
2003	Kangaroo Jack	Cute Girl on Plane	Feature film
2005	The Instructional Guide to Dating	Hostess	Short film
2006	Voodoo Lagoon	Carolina	Feature film
2007	Gravy	Angie	Short film
2007	Acting Out	Skye	Video
2008	Glass	Woman	Short film
2009	The Dinner Party	Angela King	Feature film
2009	The Makeover	Patricia Bartlett	Feature film
2009	The Marine 2	Robin Linwood	Feature film
2010	Little Leopold	Annabel	Short film
2012	Ryder Country	Madson Casey	Feature film
2012	The Boy Who'd Never Seen Rain	Rita Cobblin	Short film
2013	Stew	Mother	Short film
2015	Women He's Undressed	Ginger Rogers	Feature film
2023	13th Summer	Lisa	Feature film
	Jack & Layla	Layla	Short film

=== Television ===
Year	Title	Role	Type
1996–99	Heartbreak High	Anita Scheppers (main role)	TV series
1998	State Coroner	Kelly	TV series, episode: "Three's a Crowd"
1998–99	Home and Away	Bianca Zeboat (recurring role)	TV series
1999	All Saints	Cathy Maxwell	TV series, episode: "Endgame"
2000	Above the Law	Caitlin	TV series, 2 episodes: "Happy Families", "Daddy's Girl"
2000	The Lost World	Phoebe	TV series, episode: "Amazons"
2001	BeastMaster	Marika	TV series, epIsode: "Golgotha"
2001	Head Start	Posy (recurring role)	TV series
2002	The Lost World	Finn (main role)	TV series, 8 episodes
2003	Evil Never Dies	Maggie	TV film
2003	Balmain Boys	Fiona	TV film
2003	Mermaids	Cynthia	TV film
2004	DeMarco Affairs	Erika Liechtenstein	TV film
2004	BlackJack: Sweet Science	Claire	TV film
2005	Blue Water High	Erica	TV series, episode: "Timing Is Everything"
2006	Stepfather of the Bride	Natalie	TV film
2006	H2O: Just Add Water	Dr. Linda Denman	TV series, 3 episodes: "The Denman Affair", "Dr. Danger", "A Twist in the Tail"
2007–08	Home and Away	Marie Cashman (recurring role)	TV series
2008	All Saints	Phoebe Speight	TV series, episode: "Out of the Fire"
2009	The Jesters	Sarah	TV series, episode: "Going Corporate"
2017	Home and Away	Quinn Jackson (recurring role)	TV series
2018	Time & Place	Rebecca Woodruff	TV series, post-production
2024	Heartbreak High (2022 TV series)	Anita Scheppers	TV series, season 2 episode 3 "The Feelings Pit"
