= Naomi (wrestler) =

American professional wrestler and dancer (born 1987)

Naomì
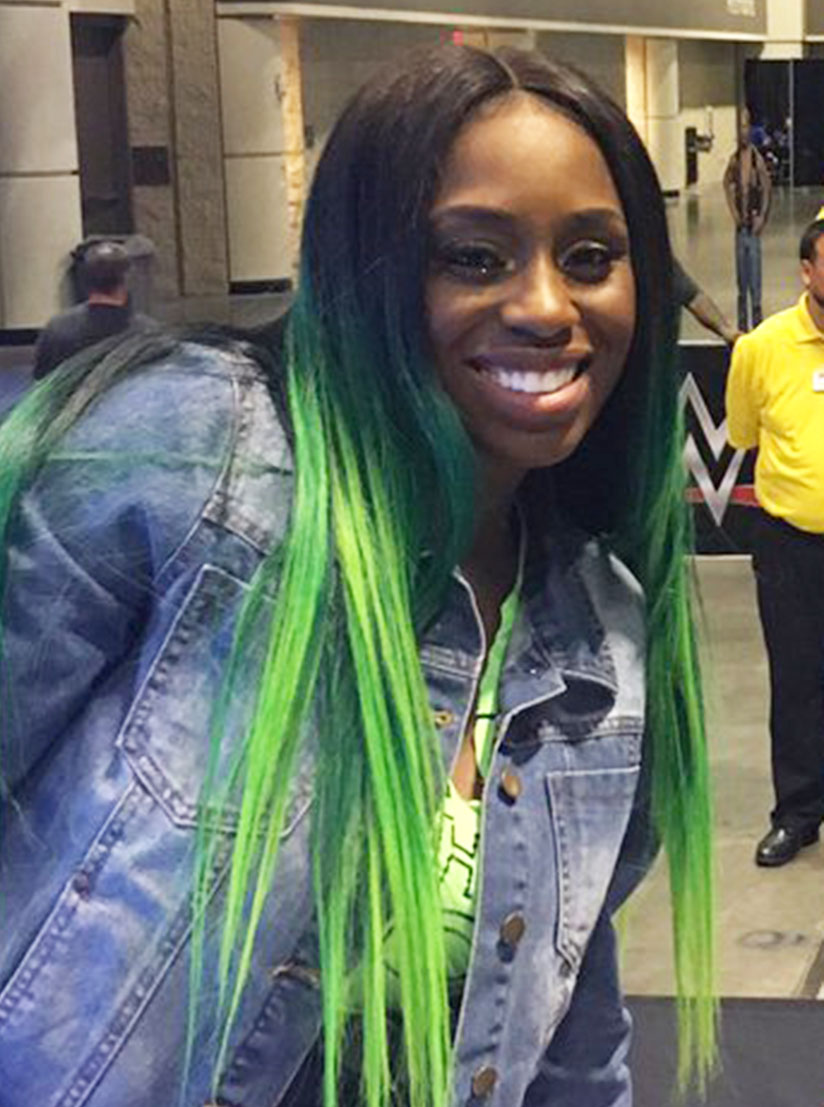
- Naomi in 2017

Personal information
- Born: Trinity LaShawn McCray; November 30, 1987 (age 38) Sanford, Florida, U.S.
- Spouse: Jimmy Uso (m. 2014)
- Family: Anoaʻi

Professional wrestling career
- Ring name(s): Ms. Florida; Naomi; Naomi Knight; Naomi Night; Trinity; Trinity McCray
- Billed height: 5 ft 5 in (165 cm)
- Billed from: "Planet Funk"; Orlando, Florida
- Debut: September 2009

Trinity LaShawn Fatu (née McCray; born November 30, 1987) is an American professional wrestler, dancer and actress. As of January 2024, she is signed to WWE, where she performs on the Raw brand under the ring name Naomi.

In August 2009, McCray signed with WWE. She was assigned to its former developmental territory, Florida Championship Wrestling (FCW), where she was the inaugural FCW Divas Champion. In August 2010, she competed in the all-female third season of NXT, where she finished in second place. She then made her main roster debut alongside Cameron as The Funkadactyls in January 2012. From 2014 to 2015, she was an on-screen manager for The Usos (Jey Uso and Jimmy Uso). As a solo competitor, Naomi held the WWE (SmackDown) Women's World Championship three times. With Sasha Banks, she obtained the WWE Women's Tag Team Championship in 2022. A month later, Naomi and Banks received indefinite suspensions from WWE after the two walked out due to a creative dispute. In 2023, Fatu stated she had departed the company and later performed as part of Total Nonstop Action (TNA) Wrestling, where she became TNA Knockouts World Champion. She returned to WWE in January 2024 at the Royal Rumble event.

Outside of wrestling, Naomi danced for the basketball team the Orlando Magic as well as rapper Flo Rida. She appeared as one of the main cast members of WWE's reality television series Total Divas from 2013 to 2019 and acted in the 2017 film The Marine 5: Battleground.

== Early life ==
Trinity LaShawn McCray was born in Sanford, Florida. She graduated from Oviedo High School. Before starting a career in wrestling, she was one of the dancers for the basketball team the Orlando Magic. She also performed as a background dancer for rapper Flo Rida. Her father, Shawn McCray, is a musician who performed Fatu's entrance music at SummerSlam 2025.

== Professional wrestling career ==
=== World Wrestling Entertainment/WWE (2009–2022) ===
==== Developmental territories (2009–2011) ====
In August 2009, McCray signed a contract with WWE, where she reported to their then-developmental territory Florida Championship Wrestling (FCW). On June 20, 2010, Naomi defeated Serena Deeb on FCW TV to become the inaugural FCW Divas Champion. On the August 29 episode of FCW TV, Naomi competed in a match against AJ Lee, where both the Queen of FCW title and the FCW Divas Championship were on the line, which ended in a double count-out. Naomi joined the all-female third season of NXT in 2010, with Kelly Kelly as her pro. She made her in-ring debut on the September 7 episode of NXT, where she teamed with Kelly to defeat Alicia Fox and fellow rookie Maxine after Naomi pinned Maxine. On the September 21 episode of NXT, she teamed with Kelly and Jamie Keyes, defeating Layla, Michelle McCool, and Kaitlyn. On the October 26 episode of NXT, Naomi defeated Maxine in a singles match. On November 30, Naomi lost the competition to Kaitlyn, placing second in the season. On the January 23, 2011 episode of FCW TV, Naomi lost the FCW Divas Championship to AJ Lee.

==== The Funkadactyls (2012–2014) ====
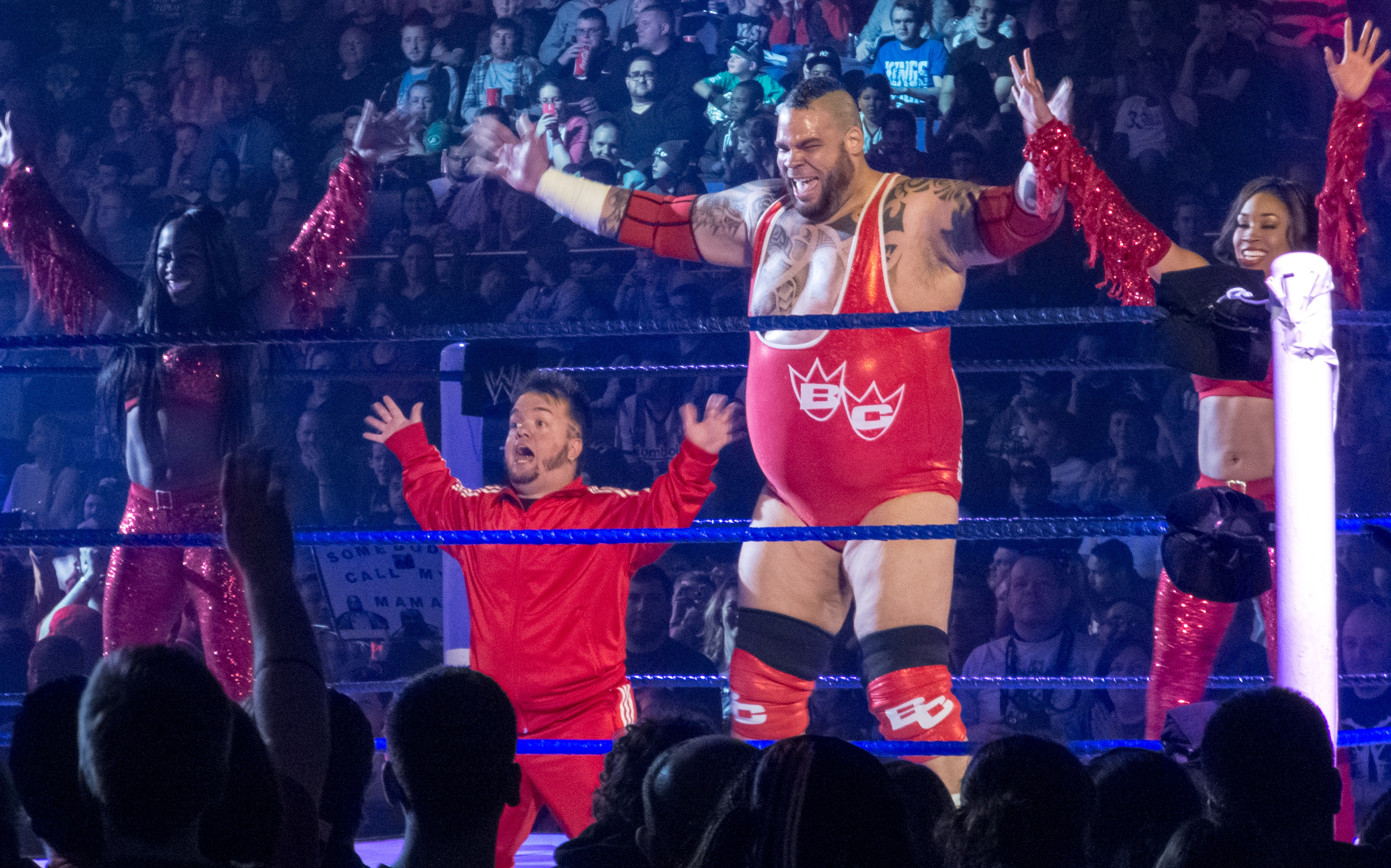
Naomi (left) at the ring along Brodus Clay, dance partner Cameron, and Hornswoggle (front) in April 2012

On January 9, 2012, Naomi made her main roster debut on Raw alongside Cameron as valets for Brodus Clay, with the duo dubbed The Funkadactyls. On the TLC pre-show on December 16, Naomi scored a victory in a Santa's Little Helpers battle royal, earning a match against Divas Champion Eve Torres later that night, where she lost. On the March 15, 2013, episode of SmackDown, The Funkadactyls were attacked backstage by The Bella Twins. The Funkadactyls, Clay, and Tensai, collectively known as Tons of Funk, were originally set to face Team Rhodes Scholars (Cody Rhodes and Damien Sandow) and the Bella Twins in an eight-person mixed tag team match at WrestleMania 29, but after the match was cut due to time constraints, it instead took place the following night on Raw, with Tons of Funk coming out victorious.

On the August 26 episode of Raw, Naomi was ringside for a match between Natalya and Brie Bella alongside the cast of Total Divas, also including Cameron, Nikki Bella, Eva Marie, and JoJo Offerman, which ended with Divas Champion AJ Lee coming out and cutting a worked shoot promo directed at the women. On the September 15, Naomi competed against Natalya, Brie Bella, and Lee in a fatal four-way match for the Divas Championship at Night of Champions, where Lee retained the title. The cast of Total Divas went on to defeat Lee, Alicia Fox, Aksana, Kaitlyn, Rosa Mendes, Tamina Snuka, and Summer Rae in a traditional elimination tag team match at Survivor Series. On December 15 at TLC: Tables, Ladders & Chairs, Naomi, Cameron and Tensai abandoned Clay due to his attitude.

In February 2014, Naomi suffered a legitimate displaced fracture of the orbital bone during a match against Aksana on Raw. She returned on the March 17 episode of Raw, teaming with Cameron to defeat Lee and Snuka in a tag team match. On April 6 at WrestleMania XXX, Naomi competed in the Vickie Guerrero Invitational match for the Lee's Divas Championship, where Lee successfully retained her title. At Money in the Bank, Naomi lost to the new Divas Champion Paige in a title match. On the July 7 episode of Raw, Naomi and Cameron lost to Lee and Paige in a tag team match, which caused a brawl to ensue between Cameron and Naomi. Naomi and Cameron faced off on the Battleground pre-show, during which the former lost. Naomi went on to secure a victory over Cameron on the September 15 episode of Raw. At Survivor Series, Naomi participated in a traditional elimination tag team match, where she eliminated Cameron and eventually Paige to get the win for her team in a clean sweep.

In December 2014, Naomi became involved with The Usos' feud with The Miz, which involved The Miz offering to help further Naomi's musical career, much to her husband Jimmy Uso's dismay. On the December 16 episode of Super SmackDown, Naomi competed against Nikki Bella for the Divas Championship, where she lost the match after Jimmy Uso caused a distraction due to his anger of The Miz being present. After Alicia Fox joined The Miz and Mizdow, Naomi and the Usos competed against the three in a series of mixed tag team matches, where Naomi's team repeatedly lost. On March 29, 2015, she accompanied The Usos during their match on the WrestleMania 31 pre-show, in which they unsuccessfully challenged Kidd and Cesaro for the WWE Tag Team Championship.

==== Team B.A.D. (2015–2016) ====
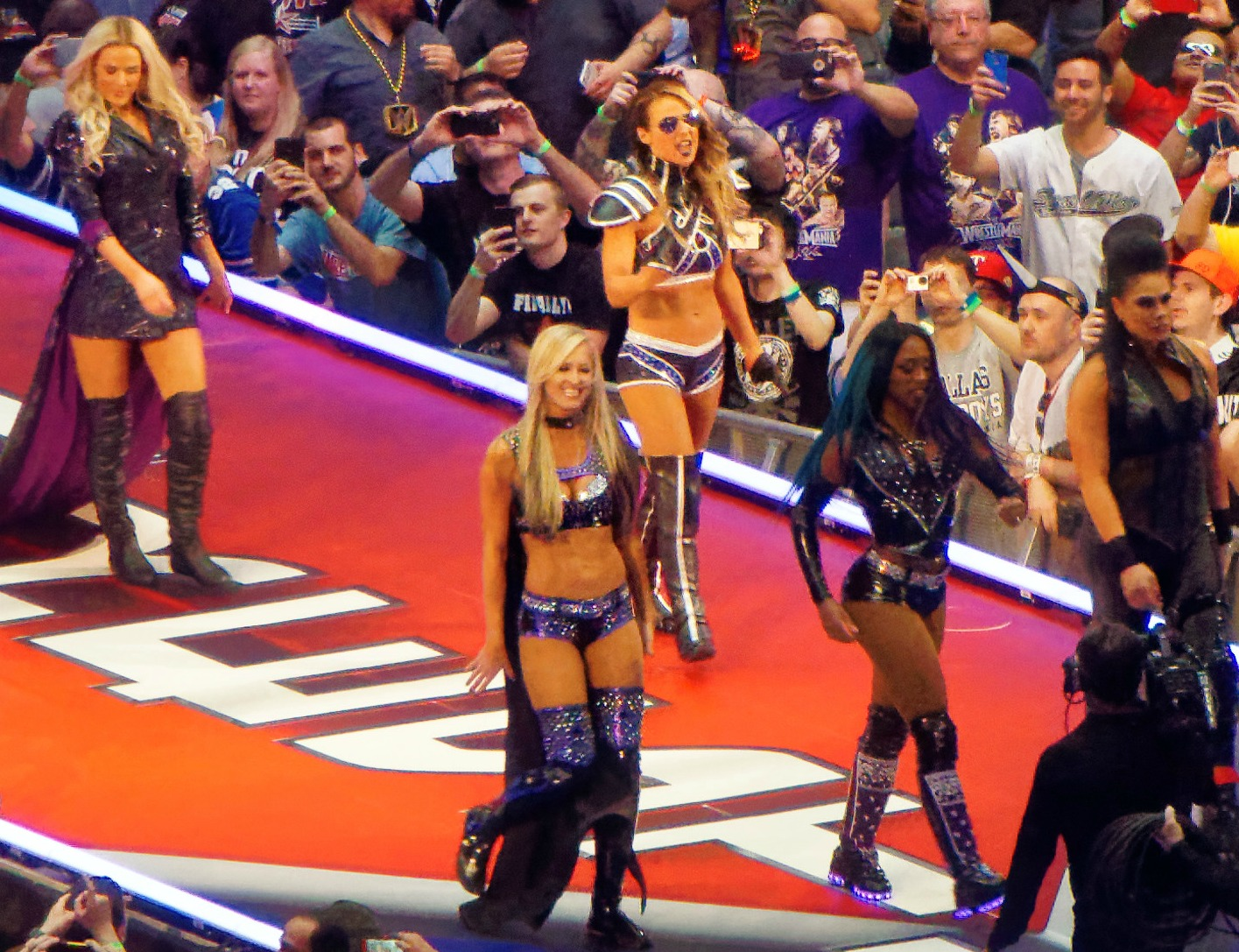
Naomi (front center) alongside fellow Team B.A.D. & Blonde members at WrestleMania 32 event in April 2016

On the April 13 episode of Raw, Naomi unsuccessfully competed in a battle royal to determine the number one contender to the Divas Championship. After the bout, Naomi attacked Paige for eliminating her to ultimately win the match, turning heel. As Paige had been injured by the attack, Naomi was granted a match against Bella for the title at Extreme Rules, where she failed to win after interference from Brie Bella. In May, Naomi attacked The Bella Twins alongside the returning Tamina. The duo went on to compete in a tag team match against The Bella Twins at Payback, during which Naomi and Tamina won. On the May 18 episode of Raw, Naomi competed in another championship match against Nikki Bella, where Bella retained the title after Tamina caused a disqualification, and was subsequently followed by Paige's return. Naomi then competed in a triple threat match against Paige and Nikki Bella at Elimination Chamber, however once again she failed to capture the title.

On the July 13 episode of Raw, after weeks of the Divas division being dominated by The Bella Twins and their ally Alicia Fox, Stephanie McMahon called for a "Divas Revolution", subsequently introducing the debuting NXT Women's Champion Sasha Banks to align with Naomi and Tamina, dubbed Team B.A.D., as well as Charlotte Flair and Becky Lynch to align with Paige, leading to a brawl between the three teams. The three teams faced off in a three team elimination match on August 23 at SummerSlam, which was won by Team PCB. At the 2015 Tribute to the Troops in December, Team B.A.D. and Paige defeated Brie Bella, Charlotte, Fox, and Lynch in an eight-woman tag team match. On the February 1, 2016, episode of Raw, Banks left the team, which caused Naomi and Tamina to attack her. Naomi and Tamina later lost to Banks and Lynch in a tag team match at Fastlane. On the WrestleMania 32 pre-show, Naomi and Tamina teamed up with Lana, Emma, and Summer Rae in a 10-Diva tag team match against Brie Bella, Paige, Fox, Eva Marie, and Natalya, where Naomi's team was defeated. In early May, Naomi became inactive due to a torn ankle tendon.

==== SmackDown Women's Champion (2016–2017) ====
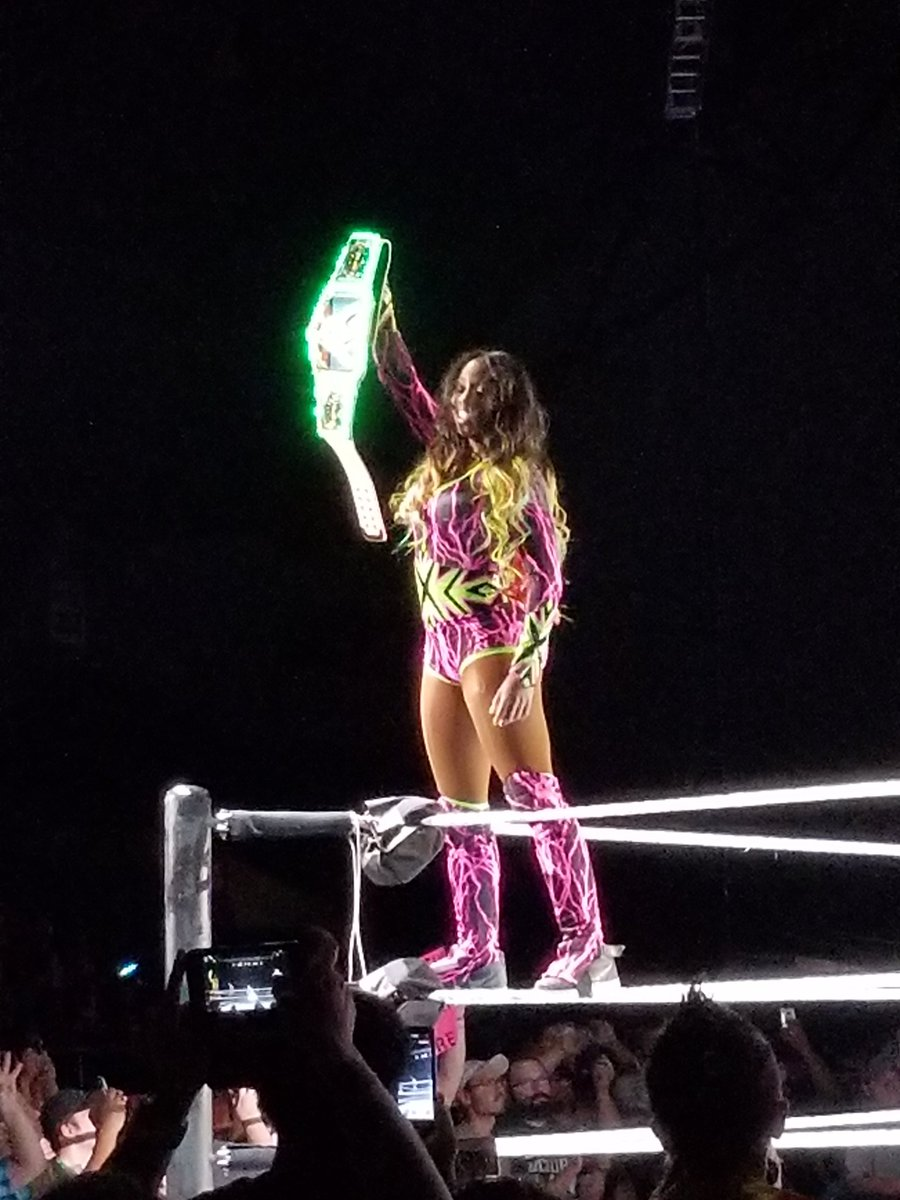
Naomi with her custom glowing SmackDown Women's Championship belt during her second reign in 2017

Naomi was drafted to the SmackDown brand on July 19 as part of the 2016 WWE draft. She then debuted a new gimmick, which included a new look and entrance, dubbed "The Glow", and became a face once again. On August 21 at SummerSlam, Naomi competed in a six-woman tag team match alongside Becky Lynch and Carmella against Natalya, Alexa Bliss, and Nikki Bella, where Naomi's team was defeated after Bella pinned Carmella. On September 11 at Backlash, Naomi competed in a six-pack elimination challenge to determine the inaugural SmackDown Women's Champion, where she eliminated Bliss before being eliminated herself by Natalya. On November 20, Naomi competed as part of the SmackDown women's team against the Raw women's team at the Survivor Series pay-per-view, where her team lost.

After two months of inactivity, Naomi returned to WWE and won the SmackDown Women’s championship at Elimination Chamber defeating Alexa Bliss, however the following week vacated the title due to a legitimate injury she sustained during the title match. She regained the title when she made her in-ring return at WrestleMania 33 in a six-pack challenge, where she made Bliss submit.

On June 18, Naomi defeated Lana to retain the SmackDown Women's Championship at Money in the Bank. She then went on to retain the title over Lana two more times on the June 27 and July 4 episodes of SmackDown, the latter of which involved a seven-second submission victory. In July, Naomi debuted a customized title belt with LED lights of various colors. On August 20 at SummerSlam, Naomi dropped the SmackDown Women's Championship to Natalya, ending her reign at 140 days. On November 19 at Survivor Series, Naomi competed in a five-on-five elimination tag team match, where she eliminated Raw team captain Alicia Fox, before being eliminated herself by Sasha Banks, with her team ultimately losing the match.

==== Various storylines and departure (2018–2022) ====
In 2018, Naomi competed in the inaugural women's Royal Rumble match at the namesake pay-per-view, won the inaugural WrestleMania Women's Battle Royal at WrestleMania 34, and participated in the first all-women's pay-per-view, Evolution, competing in a women's battle royal match, which was won by Jax. Naomi then entered a feud with Mandy Rose after Rose started flirting with her real-life husband, Jimmy Uso, to "ruin Naomi's life", which involved Rose hinting at kissing Uso as well as Naomi attacking Rose in a hotel room to which Rose invited Uso. At the Royal Rumble on January 27, 2019, Naomi and Rose eliminated each other during the women's Royal Rumble match. The two exchanged victories over each other in February. That same month, Naomi teamed up with Carmella in a six-team Elimination Chamber match for the inaugural WWE Women's Tag Team Championship at the namesake pay-per-view, where they were the first team eliminated. During the 2019 WWE Superstar Shake-up on April 15, Naomi was drafted to the Raw brand. She unsuccessfully competed in the women's Money in the Bank ladder match at the namesake pay-per-view the following month.

At Royal Rumble on January 26, 2020, Naomi returned from a hiatus by entering the Royal Rumble match at number 18, lasting 22 minutes before being eliminated by Shayna Baszler. She later attributed her time away to health issues and a relative's death. The following month, Naomi lost to Bayley in a match for the SmackDown Women's Championship at Super Showdown. In April at WrestleMania 36, Naomi competed in a five-way elimination match for the same title, during which she was eliminated by Sasha Banks. In September, she underwent surgery to remove a fibroid. As part of the 2020 WWE Draft in October, Naomi was drafted back to the Raw brand. She returned at Royal Rumble in January 2021 during the 30-woman Royal Rumble match, entering at number 2, where she was eliminated by Shayna Baszler and Nia Jax. She teamed with Lana to compete in a tag team turmoil match during the first night of WrestleMania 37 to determine the No. 1 contenders for the Women's Tag Team Championship, where the duo was defeated. In August 2021, Naomi became part of the SmackDown roster. She subsequently began a feud with Sonya Deville, who was an authority figure. The feud developed due to Naomi's persistence in asking for matches, irritating Deville. Naomi and Deville eliminated each other from the Royal Rumble match at the namesake event in January 2022. Naomi teamed up with Ronda Rousey to defeat Deville and Charlotte Flair at Elimination Chamber the next month.

On the second night of WrestleMania 38, Naomi teamed with Sasha Banks to compete in a four-way tag team match for the WWE Women's Tag Team Championship, in which they defeated the respective teams of Liv Morgan and Rhea Ripley, Natalya and Shayna Baszler, and titleholders Carmella and Queen Zelina to become the new WWE Women's Tag Team Champions. During the May 16 episode of Raw, Naomi and Banks legitimately walked out of the show's venue over a creative dispute after a meeting with CEO Vince McMahon. This caused a change to the show's main event that originally involved both women. Naomi and Banks consequently received indefinite suspensions, and the title was vacated. In March 2023, Naomi stated that she was no longer with WWE.

=== Impact Wrestling / Total Nonstop Action Wrestling (2023–2024) ===
On April 28, 2023, Fatu made her Impact Wrestling debut during the tapings of Impact!, which aired on tape delay on May 4, under the ring name Trinity. She appeared during a confrontation involving her, Impact Knockouts World Champion Deonna Purrazzo, and Jordynne Grace, during which she proclaimed her intention to win the title. On May 26 at Under Siege, Trinity competed in her first pay-per-view match since WrestleMania 38, defeating Gisele Shaw.

At Slammiversary in July 15, Trinity defeated Purrazzo via submission to win the Impact Knockouts World Championship. On August 27, during the main event of Emergence, Trinity had her first successful title defense by defeating Purrazzo. at Victory Road, Trinity successfully defended her title against Alisha Edwards. On October 21, at Bound for Glory, Trinity successfully defended her title against Mickie James, in what Trinity described as one of her all-time favorite moments in her career. On November 3 (taped October 27), at Turning Point, Trinity successfully defended her title against Deonna Purrazzo in a Last Chance match. On December 9, at Final Resolution, Trinity and Jordynne Grace defeated Deonna Purrazzo and Gisele Shaw. Following Bound for Glory, it was announced that Impact Wrestling would be rebranding back to Total Nonstop Action (TNA) Wrestling in 2024, therefore the title became the TNA Knockouts World Championship. After winning the Call Your Shot Gauntlet match, it was announced that Grace was to challenge Trinity for the title. On January 13, 2024, at Hard To Kill, Trinity lost the TNA Knockouts World Championship to Grace, thus ending her reign at 182 days and marking her first pinfall loss in TNA. On the January 25 episode of TNA Impact!, Trinity was unsuccessful in regaining the title in a rematch against Grace. Her last match with TNA was a pre-taped match that aired on the February 8 episode of Impact where she tagged with Grace to defeat Gisele Shaw and Savannah Evans.

=== Return to WWE (2024–present) ===
==== Teaming with Bianca Belair (2024–2025) ====
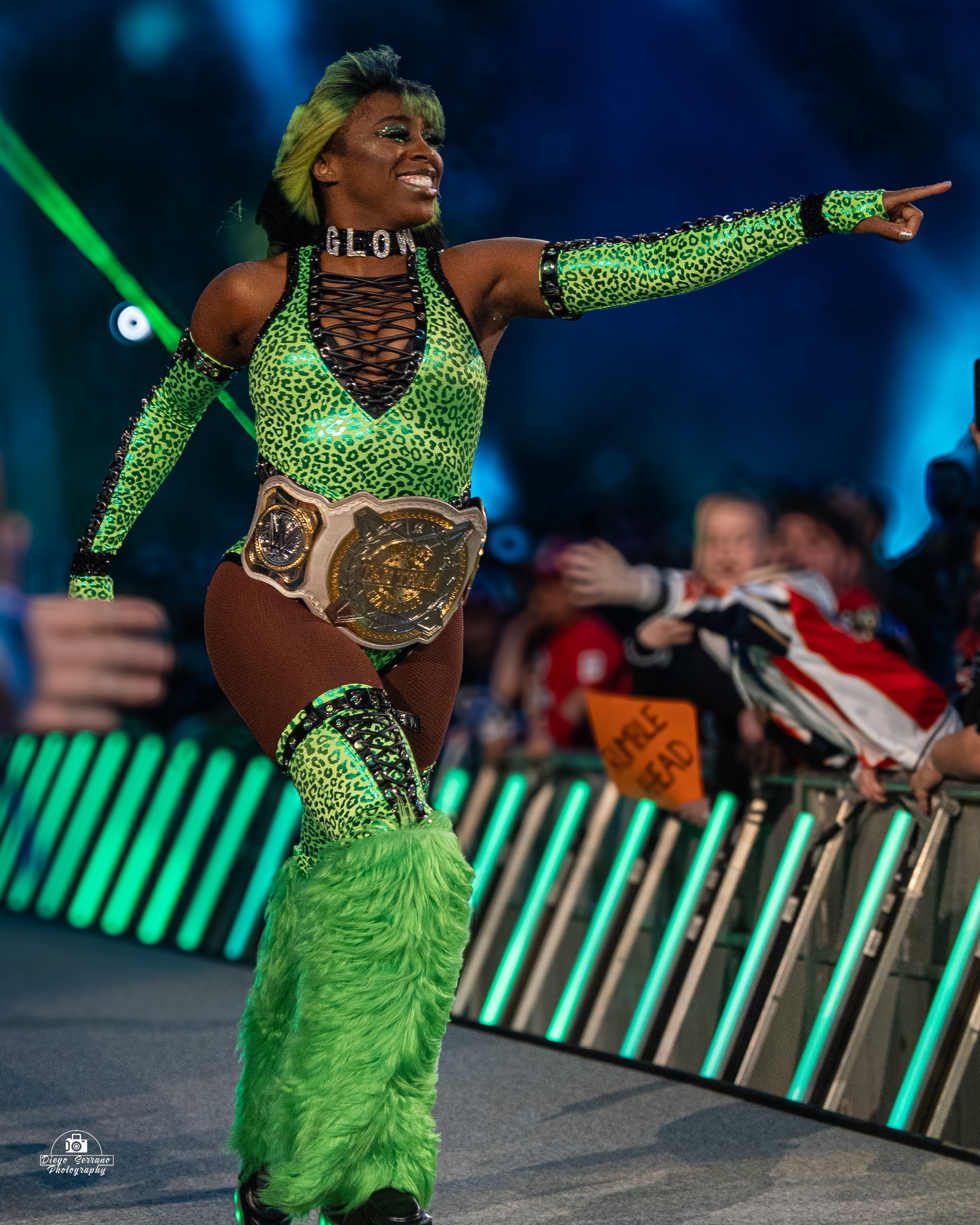
Naomi making her entrance at the 2025 Royal Rumble.

On January 27, 2024, at the Royal Rumble pay-per-view, Trinity, once again performing as Naomi, made her return to WWE marking her first appearance within the company in nearly two years as a surprise entrant in the women's Royal Rumble match, reprising her "Glow" character. Naomi entered the match at number 2 and lasted one hour and two minutes before being eliminated by the debuting Jade Cargill. On February 2, Naomi was officially assigned to the SmackDown brand. Two weeks later Naomi had her first singles match back in WWE, defeating Alba Fyre to qualify for the women's Elimination Chamber match. On February 24, at Elimination Chamber: Perth, Naomi was unsuccessful in the match, being eliminated by Tiffany Stratton. On Night 1 of WrestleMania XL, Naomi teamed with Cargill and Bianca Belair, where they defeated Damage CTRL in a six-woman tag team match.

After defeating Stratton to become number one contender, Naomi faced Bayley for the WWE Women's Championship on the April 19 episode of SmackDown, where Stratton interfered and caused a disqualification. This led to a triple threat match for the title at Backlash, where Naomi was unsuccessful. On the June 28 episode of SmackDown, Naomi defeated Blair Davenport and Indi Hartwell to qualify for the women's Money in the Bank ladder match, though she was unsuccessful at the namesake event. At Survivor Series WarGames on November 30, Naomi participated in her first WarGames match alongside Bayley, Belair, Iyo Sky, and Rhea Ripley against Tiffany Stratton, Candice LeRae, Nia Jax, and The Judgment Day (Liv Morgan and Raquel Rodriguez) in a winning effort.

On the December 20 episode of SmackDown, Naomi replaced Jade Cargill, who was found attacked (kayfabe) backstage, as Bianca Belair's tag team partner to defend the WWE Women's Tag Team Championship and became officially recognized as champion. At the Royal Rumble event on February 1, 2025, Naomi competed in the namesake match entering at #15, eliminating Zoey Stark before being eliminated by Nia Jax. On the February 24 episode of Raw, Naomi and Belair lost the titles to Liv Morgan and Raquel Rodriguez after interference from "Dirty" Dominik Mysterio, ending their reign at 73 days.

==== Proceed with Caution (2025–present) ====
On March 1 at Elimination Chamber: Toronto, Naomi was due to participate in the namesake match. At the beginning of the match, however, she was attacked by a returning Jade Cargill, seemingly confirming her as Cargill's attacker. On the March 7 episode of SmackDown, Naomi confessed to being Cargill's attacker, turning heel for the first time since 2016. During this time, Naomi underwent a character change which included the usage of caution tape in her entrance and ring attire, as well as adopting the phrase "proceed with caution" as a warning to her opponents. On the April 4 episode of SmackDown, General Manager Nick Aldis announced that Naomi was to face Cargill at WrestleMania 41, the first non-title women's singles match at a WrestleMania event since 2006 and the first without a stipulation. At Night 1 of the event on April 19, Naomi lost to Cargill.

On the May 30 episode of SmackDown, Naomi defeated Cargill and Jax in a triple threat match to qualify for the women's Money in the Bank ladder match. At the event on June 7, Naomi won the Money in the Bank contract. At Evolution on July 13, Naomi lost to Cargill in a No Holds Barred match with Belair as the special guest referee ending their feud. Later that night, Naomi successfully cashed in her Money in the Bank contract on Iyo Sky during her Women's World Championship defense against Rhea Ripley and pinned Sky to win the title for the third time. Following her title win, Naomi was subsequently moved to the Raw brand. At Night 2 of SummerSlam on August 3, Naomi successfully defended the title against Ripley and Sky in a triple threat match. On the August 18 episode of Raw, Naomi was forced to vacate the title due to her real-life pregnancy, ending her reign at 36 days.

== Other media ==
She made her in-game debut in WWE '13 as a non-player character along with her then-tag team partner Cameron, appearing during Brodus Clay's entrance and winning celebration, as well as in WWE 2K14. She later appeared as a playable character in WWE 2K15, WWE 2K16, WWE 2K17, WWE 2K18, WWE 2K19, WWE 2K20, WWE 2K Battlegrounds, WWE 2K22, WWE 2K25 and WWE 2K26.

Fatu was part of the main cast of the reality television series Total Divas, produced by WWE and E!, which premiered in July 2013. Fatu was not part of the second half of season three that aired January 2015 to March 2015 but returned as a main cast member for season four. She did not appear during the show's fifth season but once again returned as a main cast member for the sixth season. She then remained on the cast until the ninth and final season.

In May 2014, she released her first single song, entitled "Dance All Night". The accompanying music video was released on WWE's YouTube channel.

In 2017, she starred in the WWE Studios film The Marine 5: Battleground, playing the role of a gang member named Murphy.

Fatu modeled as part of New York Fashion Week alongside Mercedes Varnado in September 2022. In September 2025, Fatu returned to New York Fashion Week, attending the Christian Siriano and "The Bomb" fashion shows.

== Personal life ==
Trinity and longtime boyfriend Jonathan Fatu, better known by the ring name Jimmy Uso, were married in Maui on January 16, 2014. Through their marriage, she is a member of the Anoaʻi family, a Samoan-American wrestling dynasty. The couple resides in Pensacola, Florida. She is the stepmother to Fatu's two children. On August 18, 2025, Trinity announced she was expecting her first child with Fatu.

== Filmography ==
=== Film ===
Film
Year	Title	Role	Notes
2017	The Marine 5: Battleground	Murphy	
2025	Queen of the Ring	Ethel Johnson	

=== Television ===
Year	Title	Role	Notes
2013–2019	Total Divas	Herself	Main cast (seasons 1–4, 6–9); Guest (season 5)
2015	WWE Tough Enough	Herself	Guest (season 6)
2016–2018	Ride Along	Herself	2 episodes
2018	Ridiculousness	Herself	Season 11, episode 25
2019	The Misery Index	Herself	Season 1, episode 1
2026	WWE Unreal	Herself	2 episodes

== Championships and accomplishments ==
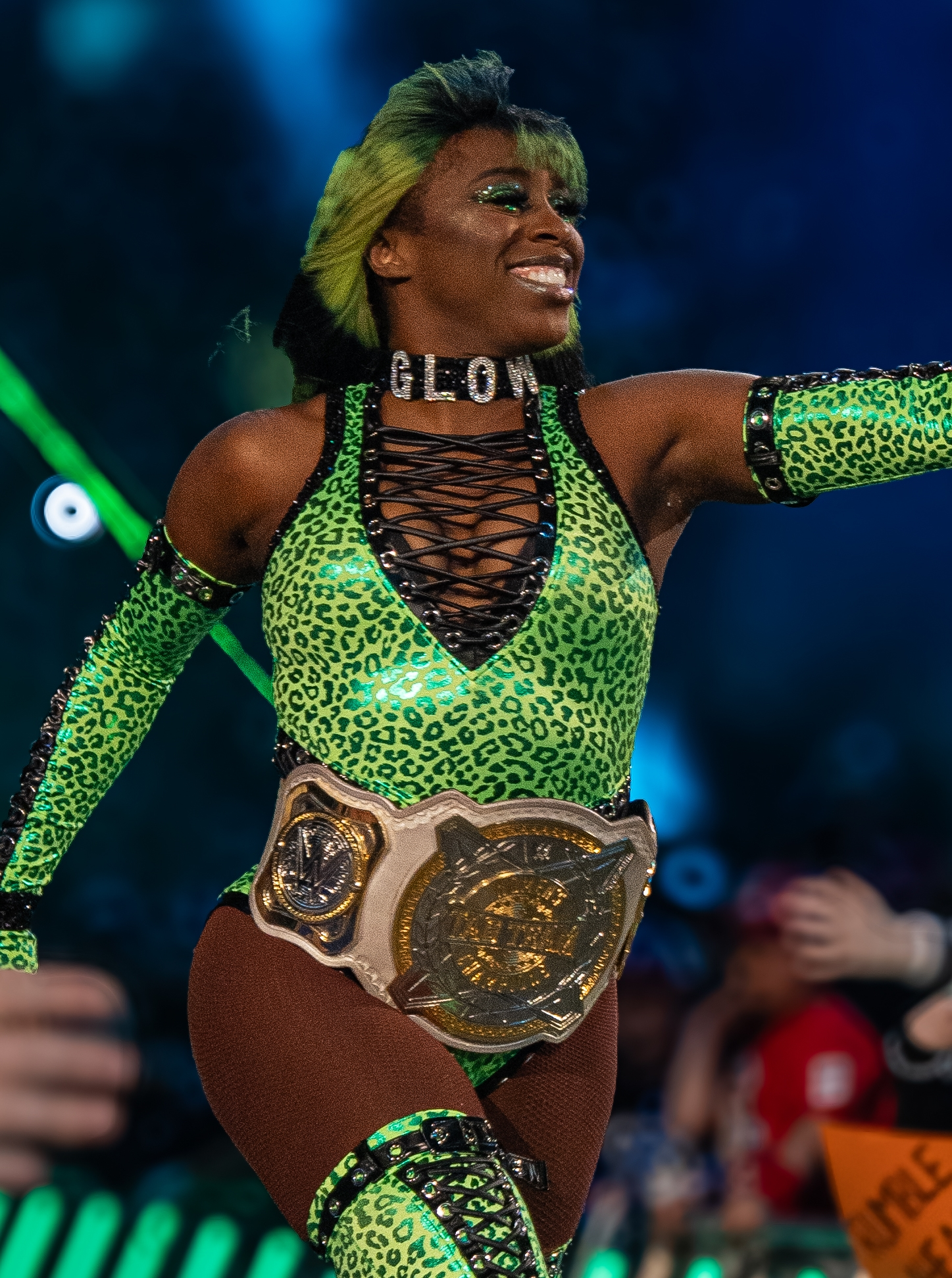
Naomi is a three-time Women's World Champion, a two-time WWE Women's Tag Team Champion....

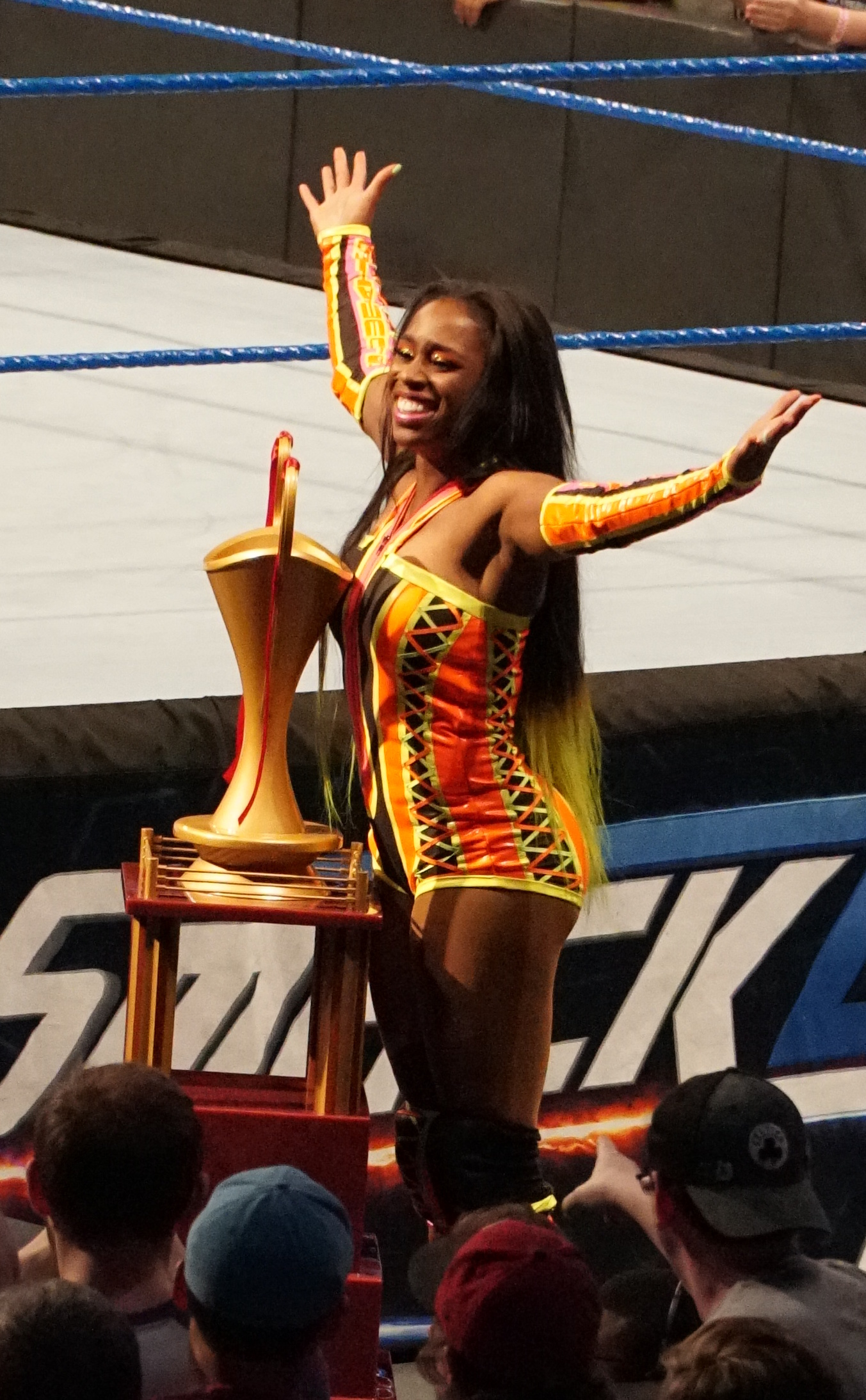
...and the 2018's WrestleMania Women's Battle Royal winner.

- Florida Championship Wrestling
  - FCW Divas Championship (1 time, inaugural)
  - FCW Divas Championship Tournament (2010)
- Impact Wrestling / Total Nonstop Action Wrestling
  - Impact Knockouts World Championship (1 time)
  - Impact Year End Awards (1 time)
    - Knockout of the Year (2023)
- Pro Wrestling Illustrated
  - Comeback of the Year (2023)
  - Ranked No. 7 of the top 50 female wrestlers in the PWI Female 50 in 2015
  - Ranked No. 9 of the top 50 female wrestlers in the PWI Female 50 in 2017
  - Ranked No. 9 of the top 250 female wrestlers in the PWI Female 250 in 2025
- Rolling Stone
  - Most Welcome Heel Turn (2015) tied with Sheamus
- Sports Illustrated
  - Ranked No. 4 of the top 10 wrestlers of 2023
  - Heel Turn of the Year (2025)
- Wrestling Observer Newsletter
  - Worst Feud of the Year (2015) Team PCB vs. Team B.A.D. vs. Team Bella
  - Worst Worked Match of the Year (2013) 14-woman elimination tag team match at Survivor Series
- Women's Wrestling Fan Awards
  - Most Underused (2020)
- WWE
  - Women's World Championship (3 times) (Note: Naomi's first two reigns occurred when the title was known as the SmackDown Women's Championship.)
  - WWE Women's Tag Team Championship (2 times) – with Sasha Banks (1) and Bianca Belair (1)
  - Women's Money in the Bank (2025)
  - WrestleMania Women's Battle Royal (2018)
  - Slammy Award (1 time)
    - Best Dance Moves of the Year (2013) – with Cameron as the Funkadactyls
  - WWE Year-End Award (1 time)
    - Most Underrated Superstar of the Year (2018)
