= WWE Studios =

American film studio

WWE Studios Inc.
- Formerly: WWE Films (2002–2008)
- Type: Subsidiary
- Industry: Film
- Predecessor: Shane Distribution Company
- Founded: July 31, 2002; 24 years ago
- Headquarters: Los Angeles, California, United States
- Area served: Worldwide
- Key people: Ben Zierten (VP, Unscripted Production and Development)
- Parent: WWE
- Divisions: WWE Studios Originals; WWE Studios Finance; WWE Films Development
- Website: WWE Studios

WWE Studios Inc. (formerly known as WWE Films) is an American film studio owned by the professional wrestling promotion WWE, a division of TKO Group Holdings, a majority-owned subsidiary of Endeavor Group Holdings. Founded on July 31, 2002, WWE Studios movies frequently mix well-known actors and actresses in lead roles with WWE wrestlers, and teams with existing production and distribution companies resulting in lower cost for both parties.

== History ==
Before the formation of WWE Studios, the WWF had produced the 1989 film No Holds Barred featuring Hulk Hogan under the Shane Distribution Company banner, a precursor to today's company. WWE Studios released the film on DVD in 2012.

WWE Studios was formed on July 31, 2002 as WWE Films, and was seen as "a natural extension of the entertainment business" that they already featured in the weekly Raw and SmackDown television programs. Joel Simon was named as President of the WWE Films and Jed Blaugrund as vice president.

WWE announced the first three film projects in January 2005; The Condemned, starring Steve Austin, The Marine, starring John Cena, and Goodnight, later retitled as See No Evil, starring Kane. Both of these independent film projects were genre films that cost $20 million.

In 2008, the name was changed to WWE Studios. On February 25, 2008, WWE had signed a deal with 20th Century Fox Home Entertainment where Fox communicated to WWE their entitlement to one theatrical film and four direct-to-DVD productions. The move was designed to expand into production of scripted television series and films for networks.

In February 2009, WWE Studios announced the first film which would not feature a WWE wrestler as the lead, with That's What I Am starring Ed Harris as a schoolteacher who's threatened to be outed as a homosexual by a conservative parent. In December 2009, it was announced that Patricia Clarkson and Danny Glover would star in the WWE Studios and Samuel Goldwyn Films co-production of Legendary along with WWE wrestler John Cena. Around the same time, it was announced that production had been completed on another co-production with Samuel Goldwyn Films, the comedy Knucklehead, which starred WWE wrestler Big Show. Further projects were announced in 2010 with WWE wrestlers in lead roles, with The Chaperone starring Triple H, which was released in February 2011, and Bending the Rules starring Edge, which was released in March 2012. These initial releases were largely unsuccessful financially.

In February 2012, WWE Studios agreed to a new three-film deal with 20th Century Fox Home Entertainment to produce, finance and market three straight-to-DVD titles, including The Marine 3: Homefront starring The Miz, having previously worked with 20th Century Fox Home Entertainment on the previous films in the franchise, The Marine and The Marine 2. The deal also included the release of 12 Rounds 2: Reloaded starring Randy Orton, having together previously released 12 Rounds starring John Cena. Also that year, WWE Studios had signed a deal with Lionsgate in order to work on upcoming projects, most notably a Leprechaun project via a two-picture deal between the two studios.

In April 2012, WWE Studios partnered with Warner Bros. Entertainment France and producer Thomas Langmann to distribute French film Les Reines Du Ring in the United States and Canada, as well as the rights to remake the film, which was announced in 2014.

WWE Studios also produced No One Lives with Pathe Pictures, starring Luke Evans and WWE wrestler Brodus Clay, and acquired the 2011 Toronto International Film Festival cult hit The Day, starring Shawn Ashmore and Dominic Monaghan. WWE Studios has also acquired Interrogation, a suspense thriller by Adam Rodin. WWE Studios then secured the rights to Bermuda, a found footage horror spec script by Bobby Lee Darby and Nathan Brookes, set in the Bermuda Triangle. WWE Studios further announced a partnership with producer Edward R. Pressman and Jason Blum's Blum-Hanson-Allen films to develop Cruisin' for a Brusin', an action comedy to be written and directed by Adam Bhala Lough. WWE Studios and Warner Bros. co-produced a Scooby-Doo animated feature that found Scooby and the gang solving a mystery at WrestleMania, which also starred an ensemble of WWE Superstars. The movie released on March 25, 2014. On May 29, 2013, it was announced that WWE studios and Warner Bros would again team up to co-produce a Flintstones animated movie to be released in early 2015.

WWE Studios most successful film to date is the 2013 release The Call, starring Halle Berry and Abigail Breslin, which made close to $70 million at the box office, despite a comparatively small budget of just $13m. The film opened at the US box office at No. 2 with 17 million in its first weekend. It was further reported that WWE was looking at a potential sequel following the success of The Call.

In 2013, WWE Studios and Hyde Park Entertainment announced a deal to work together on the film adaptation of the 1980s television series The Fall Guy. The film will star Dwayne Johnson, who made his name as The Rock in WWE from 1996 to 2004 before becoming an actor, in his second WWE Studios production, with the first being The Scorpion King. In August 2014, a second collaboration between WWE Studios and Hyde Park was announced, with Ken Jeong, David Hasselhoff and WWE Hall of Famer Hulk Hogan signed to star in a comedy Killing Hasselhoff.

In February 2014, WWE announced the sequel to the 1996 film Jingle All the Way, to star Larry the Cable Guy and WWE wrestler Santino Marella.

In May 2014, it was announced that WWE had extended their partnership with Lionsgate Entertainment to release a further six films together, with the first two announced as Vendetta, starring The Big Show and 12 Rounds 3: Lockdown starring Dean Ambrose. These group of six films have been referred as the Action Six-Pack Series.

In November 2014, WWE announced a new partnership deal with Warner Bros. Home Entertainment. In March 2015, they announced a partnership with newly founded Gene Simmons production company Erebus Pictures and in April 2015, WWE Studios teamed with British company Richwater Films to co-produce and co-finance action-thrillers Eliminators and Rampage.

In November 2017, WWE announced that WWE Studios will expand its mandate to include scripted, non-scripted, family, and animated television and digital content.

In February 2019, it was reported that WWE Studios and Netflix came to an agreement that would see WWE Studios produce new family-friendly movies for Netflix's platform.

In July 2019, it was announced that WWE Studios will be producing its first television show, Fight Like a Girl, for Quibi. It would later be moved to The Roku Channel following the closure of Quibi.

In 2021, WWE Studios announced a partnership with A+E Networks to produce factual- and documentary-style programming chronicling WWE's history and talent, primarily for its cable network A&E. The partnership began with WWE-oriented episodes of the network's long-running Biography franchise, as well as the docuseries WWE's Most Wanted Treasures. The partnership would later be expanded with additional series, including WWE Rivals, and the reality talent search WWE LFG.

== Filmography ==
=== Film ===
Year	Title	US release date	WWE Superstar(s) featured	Distributor	Notes
2002	The Scorpion King	April 19, 2002	The Rock	Universal Pictures	Released as WWF Entertainment
2003	The Rundown	September 26, 2003	The Rock	Universal Pictures	First theatrical film released as WWE Films
2004	Walking Tall	April 2, 2004	The Rock	Metro-Goldwyn-Mayer	
2006	See No Evil	May 19, 2006	Kane	Lionsgate	
2006	The Marine	October 13, 2006	John Cena	20th Century Fox	
2007	The Condemned	April 27, 2007	Steve Austin	Lionsgate	Last theatrical film released as WWE Films
2009	Behind Enemy Lines: Colombia	January 6, 2009	Mr. Kennedy	20th Century Fox	Straight-to-video
2009	12 Rounds	March 27, 2009	John Cena	20th Century Fox	First theatrical film released as WWE Studios
2009	The Marine 2	June 19, 2009	Ted DiBiase Jr.	20th Century Fox	Straight-to-video
2010	Legendary	September 10, 2010	John Cena	Samuel Goldwyn Films	
2010	Knucklehead	October 22, 2010	Big Show	Samuel Goldwyn Films	
2011	The Chaperone	February 18, 2011	Paul "Triple H" Levesque	Samuel Goldwyn Films	
2011	That's What I Am	April 29, 2011	Randy Orton	Samuel Goldwyn Films	
2011	Inside Out	September 9, 2011	Paul "Triple H" Levesque	Samuel Goldwyn Films	
2011	The Reunion	October 21, 2011	John Cena	Samuel Goldwyn Films	
2012	Bending the Rules	March 9, 2012	Edge	Entertainment One	
2012	The Day	August 29, 2012		Anchor Bay Films; WWE Studios	Distribution only
2012	Barricade	September 25, 2012		WWE Studios	
2012	The Marine 3: Homefront	November 14, 2012	The Miz	20th Century Fox	Straight-to-video
2013	Dead Man Down	March 8, 2013	Wade Barrett	FilmDistrict	
2013	The Call	March 15, 2013	David Otunga	TriStar Pictures	
2013	No One Lives	May 10, 2013	Brodus Clay	Anchor Bay Films	
2013	Queens of the Ring (Les reines du ring)	July 3, 2013 (France); July 25, 2014 (US)	Various cameos (Note: Cameos include: The Miz, CM Punk, Eve Torres.)	Image Entertainment	Theatrical Film (US)
2013	12 Rounds 2: Reloaded	March 1, 2013	Randy Orton	20th Century Fox	Straight-to-video
2013	Christmas Bounty	November 26, 2013	The Miz	Warner Bros.	TV movie
2014	Scooby-Doo! WrestleMania Mystery	March 25, 2014	Various voices (Note: Voices include: Brodus Clay, Michael Cole, Kane, AJ Lee, Santino Marella, The Miz, Paul "Triple H" Levesque, John Cena, and Vince McMahon.)	Warner Bros.	Straight-to-video, animated
2014	Oculus	April 11, 2014		Relativity Media	
2014	Road to Paloma	July 11, 2014		Anchor Bay Entertainment; WWE Studios	Distribution only
2014	Leprechaun: Origins	August 22, 2014	Hornswoggle	Lionsgate	
2014	See No Evil 2	May 23, 2014	Kane	Lionsgate	Straight-to-video
2014	Jingle All the Way 2	June 27, 2014	Santino Marella	20th Century Fox	Straight-to-video
2015	Vendetta	June 12, 2015	Big Show	Lionsgate	Straight-to-video, 1st installment in the Action Six-Pack series
2015	The Flintstones & WWE: Stone Age SmackDown!	March 10, 2015	Various voices (Note: Voices include: Brie Bella, The Undertaker, Nikki Bella, CM Punk, Vince McMahon, Rey Mysterio, Daniel Bryan, Mark Henry, and John Cena.)	Warner Bros.	Straight-to-video, animated
2015	The Marine 4: Moving Target	April 21, 2015	The Miz; Summer Rae	20th Century Fox	Straight-to-video
2015	12 Rounds 3: Lockdown	September 11, 2015	Dean Ambrose	Lionsgate	Straight-to-video, 2nd installment in the Action Six-Pack series
2015	The Condemned 2	November 6, 2015	Randy Orton	Lionsgate	Straight-to-video
2015	Santa's Little Helper	November 17, 2015	The Miz; Paige; Maryse Ouellet	20th Century Fox	Straight-to-video
2016	Countdown	November 30, 2016	Dolph Ziggler; Kane; Various cameos (Note: Cameos include: Lana, Rusev, Jimmy Uso, Jey Uso, Roman Reigns, Santino Marella, Dean Ambrose, Curtis Axel, Mark Henry, Big Show, Daniel Bryan, Heath Slater, Randy Orton, Charles Robinson, Big E, Kofi Kingston, Xavier Woods, Viktor, Konnor, Sin Cara, Kalisto, Brock Lesnar, and Paul Heyman.)	Lionsgate	Straight-to-video
2016	Term Life	April 29, 2016		Focus World	Limited release
2016	Interrogation	July 1, 2016	Edge; Lana	Lionsgate	3rd installment in the Action Six-Pack series
2016	Scooby-Doo! and WWE: Curse of the Speed Demon	July 26, 2016 (Digital HD); August 6, 2016 (Home video)	Various voices (Note: Voices include: The Undertaker, Paul "Triple H" Levesque, Stephanie McMahon, Vince McMahon, Michael Cole, Paige, Sheamus, Kofi Kingston, Dusty Rhodes, The Miz, Rusev, Lana, Goldust, Stardust, Diego, Fernando, and El Torito.)	Warner Bros.	Straight-to-video, animated
2016	Incarnate	December 2, 2016	Mark Henry	BH Tilt	
2016	Eliminators	June 24, 2016	Wade Barrett	Universal Pictures	
2017	Surf's Up 2: WaveMania	January 16, 2017	Various voices (Note: Voices include: The Undertaker, Paul "Triple H" Levesque, Paige, John Cena, Michael Cole and Vince McMahon.)	Sony Pictures Animation	Straight-to-video, animated
2017	The Resurrection of Gavin Stone	January 20, 2017	Shawn Michaels	BH Tilt	
2017	The Jetsons & WWE: Robo-WrestleMania!	February 28, 2017 (Digital HD); March 14, 2017 (Home video)	Various voices (Note: Voices include: Sheamus, Dolph Ziggler, Stardust, Michael Cole, Roman Reigns, Seth Rollins, Alicia Fox, Big Show, Vince McMahon, and The Usos.)	Warner Bros.	Straight-to-video, animated
2017	Sleight	April 28, 2017		Universal Pictures	Distribution only
2017	Pure Country: Pure Heart	August 1, 2017	Shawn Michaels	Warner Bros. Home Entertainment	Straight-to-video
2017	Armed Response	August 4, 2017	Seth Rollins	Erebus Pictures	Straight-to-video
2017	Birth of the Dragon	August 25, 2017		BH Tilt	
2017	Killing Hasselhoff	August 29, 2017	The Iron Sheik; Hulk Hogan	Image Nation	Straight-to-video
2017	The Marine 5: Battleground	December 14, 2017 (Digital HD); March 28, 2017 (Home Video)	The Miz; Maryse Ouellet; Heath Slater; Curtis Axel; Bo Dallas; Naomi	Sony Pictures Worldwide Acquisitions	Straight-to-video
2018	The Marine 6: Close Quarters	November 13, 2018	The Miz; Becky Lynch; Shawn Michaels	Sony Pictures Worldwide Acquisitions	Straight-to-video
2018	Blood Brother	November 30, 2018	R-Truth	CodeBlack Films	
2019	Fighting with My Family	February 14, 2019	The Rock; Big Show; Sheamus; The Miz; Zelina Vega	Metro-Goldwyn-Mayer (via Mirror Releasing) (United States); Lionsgate (United Kingdom and the Republic of Ireland); Universal Pictures (elsewhere)	
2020	Buddy Games	November 24, 2020	Sheamus	Saban Films	
2020	The Main Event	April 10, 2020	Sheamus; The Miz; Kofi Kingston; Beth Phoenix; Mauro Ranallo; Babatunde Aiyegbusi; Keith Lee; Mia Yim; Otis; Renee Young; Corey Graves	Netflix	
2021	Escape the Undertaker	October 5, 2021	The Undertaker; Kofi Kingston; Big E Xavier Woods	Netflix	
2021	Rumble	December 15, 2021	Becky Lynch; Roman Reigns	Paramount Pictures; Paramount Animation; Walden Media; Reel FX Animation Studios	

=== Television ===
Year	Title	US release date	WWE Superstar(s) featured	Distributor	Notes
2018	André the Giant	April 10, 2018	Various Hall of Famers and Legends	HBO	Co-produced with HBO Sports, JMH Films, and Ringer Films
2018	Miz & Mrs.	July 24, 2018 – July 25, 2022	The Miz; Maryse Mizanin	USA Network	Co-produced with Bunim/Murray Productions
2020	The Big Show Show	April 6, 2020 – December 9, 2020	Big Show	Netflix	Co-produced with Z+M Industrial Films and Northrock 6
2020	Fight Like a Girl	April 13, 2020	Alexa Bliss; Becky Lynch; Brie Bella; Charlotte Flair; Natalya; Nia Jax; Nikki Bella; Sasha Banks; Sonya Deville; Stephanie McMahon	Quibi (original); The Roku Channel (acquisition following the closure of Quibi)	
2021	Biography: WWE Legends	April 18, 2021 – present	Numerous Legends and Hall of Famers	A&E Network	
2021	WWE's Most Wanted Treasures	April 18, 2021 – present	Stephanie McMahon; Paul "Triple H" Levesque; AJ Francis; Numerous Legends and Hall of Famers	A&E Network	
2022	Corey & Carmella	February 28, 2022	Corey Graves; Carmella	YouTube	
2022	WWE Evil	March 24, 2022	Various WWE Superstars	Peacock	
2022	WWE Rivals	July 10, 2022 – present	Various WWE Superstars, Legends, and Hall of Famers	A&E Network	
2022	WWE Smack Talk	July 10, 2022 – September 4, 2022	Booker T Jackie Redmond	A&E Network	
2024	Love & WWE: Bianca & Montez	February 2, 2024	Montez Ford; Bianca Belair	Hulu	Co-produced with Hulu
2024	WWE: Next Gen	April 1, 2024	John Cena	The Roku Channel	Co-produced with A. Smith & Co. Productions and Hard Nocks South Productions
2024	Bray Wyatt: Becoming Immortal	April 1, 2024	Various WWE Superstars, Legends, and Hall of Famers	Peacock	
2025	WWE LFG	February 16, 2025 – present	Various Hall of Famers and Legends	A&E Network	
2025	Everything on the Menu With Braun Strowman	October 24, 2025 – present	Braun Strowman	USA Network	Executive producer: Triple H
2026	Agent of Shadows	October 23, 2026	Drew McIntyre, Michael Hayes, Hank Walker, Tank Ledger, Jacob Fatu, Booker T, Nikkita Lyons, Royce Keys, Joe Hendry	ReelShort	
