= The Marine =

2006 action film by John Bonito

- Theatrical release poster
- Directed by: John Bonito
- Screenplay by: Michelle Gallagher; Alan B. McElroy
- Story by: Michelle Gallagher
- Produced by: Joel Simon; Kathryn Sommer-Parry; Jonathan Winfrey
- Starring: John Cena; Kelly Carlson; Robert Patrick
- Cinematography: David Eggby
- Edited by: Dallas Puett
- Music by: Don Davis
- Production company: WWE Films
- Distributed by: 20th Century Fox
- Release date: October 13, 2006
- Running time: 91 minutes
- Country: United States
- Language: English
- Budget: $15 million
- Box office: $22.2 million

The Marine is a 2006 American action film directed by John Bonito from a story written by Alan B. McElroy and Michelle Gallagher. It stars professional wrestler John Cena, in his acting debut. It was executive produced by Vince McMahon through the film production division of WWE called WWE Films and distributed in the United States by 20th Century Fox. In the film, a recently discharged U.S. Marine goes after a group of diamond thieves after they kidnapped his wife.

The Marine was released theatrically on October 13, 2006, to negative reviews and grossed $22 million against a production budget of $15 million. It is the first installment in The Marine film series, spawning five direct-to-video sequels.

== Plot ==
In Iraq, John Triton, a U.S. Marine, arrives at an al-Qaeda hideout, where a group of terrorists are preparing to behead several hostages. Disregarding direct orders to wait for reinforcements, Triton attacks the extremists and rescues the hostages. The next morning, his colonel informs Triton that he is being honorably discharged for disobeying direct orders.

Now retired, Triton finds it hard to settle back into normal life. He is fired from his job as a security guard for using excessive force on an employee's ex-boyfriend and his bodyguards. Triton's wife, Kate, decides the two need a vacation to help Triton adjust to his new life. Meanwhile, criminal Rome robs a jewelry store with his gang: girlfriend Angela, Morgan, Vescera, and Bennett. Rome is in collusion with an anonymous partner, with whom he plans to share the profits from the diamonds. On the run, the gang stops at a gas station where Triton and Kate have stopped. When two policemen arrive to buy gas, Morgan shoots and kills one of the officers, causing Rome to shoot the other officer, while Angela kills the gas station attendant. When Triton reacts to Kate being kidnapped, Bennett knocks him out. Triton regains consciousness and gives chase in the policemen's car. The chase leads to a lake, where Triton falls out of the patrol car and into the lake, seemingly to his death.

Rome and his gang walk through a swamp to avoid the police. Kate tries to escape several times. Triton emerges from the lake to find Detective Van Buren pursuing the gang. Van Buren denies Triton permission to pursue the gang, but Triton heads into the swamp anyway. After an altercation between Morgan and Vescera, Rome decides to kill Vescera. Rome receives a call from his anonymous partner and tells him he intends to cut the partner out of the deal.

The gang arrives at a lodge and decides to rest there for the time being. Meanwhile, Triton is kidnapped by two fugitives who believe he is a police officer looking for them. He subdues them and tracks the gang to the lodge. He kills Morgan and Bennett, then drags the bodies under the lodge, where he again meets Detective Van Buren.

Kate rushes out of the lodge, but Angela attacks and recaptures her. Meanwhile, Triton enters the lodge and finds himself face-to-face with Rome and his gun. Van Buren enters the room but points his gun at Triton, revealing himself to be the anonymous partner. Rome opens fire on Triton, who uses Van Buren as a human shield, killing him. Rome makes his escape and joins up with Angela and Kate before firing at a gasoline tank and blowing up the lodge. Triton makes a narrow escape, having been blown into the swamp.

Rome escapes in Van Buren's car but abandons it after a police tracking device is activated. Angela seduces and kills a truck driver for his truck. Triton is arrested by a marine patrol officer, but steals the officer's vessel after handcuffing him. He races to the marina that is Rome's destination and jumps on Rome's truck, throwing Angela into the windshield of an oncoming bus, killing her and spilling the diamonds. Rome scrapes Triton off the truck by careening through a warehouse, then leaps out just before the truck crashes into a lake. Triton engages Rome in hand-to-hand combat and knocks him out before he leaves Rome in the burning warehouse to rescue Kate, who is drowning in the truck. A badly-burned Rome returns and tries to choke Triton with a chain, but Triton kills Rome by breaking his neck with the chain. Triton and Kate kiss as the police arrive.

== Cast ==
- John Cena as Sergeant John Triton
- Robert Patrick as Rome, Gang Leader
- Kelly Carlson as Kate Triton, John's Wife
- Anthony Ray Parker as Morgan, Rome's Crew
- Abigail Bianca as Angela, Rome's Lover & Crew
- Damon Gibson as Vescera, Rome's Crew
- Manu Bennett as Bennett, Rome's Crew
- Jerome Ehlers as Detective Van Buren, Rome's Accomplice
- Drew Powell as Joe Linwood
- Firass Dirani as Rebel Leader
- Frank Carlopio as Frank
- Jeff Chase as Billy
- Jamal Duff as Paul
- Laurence Breuls as Fran
- Lincoln Kennedy as L.K.

== Production ==
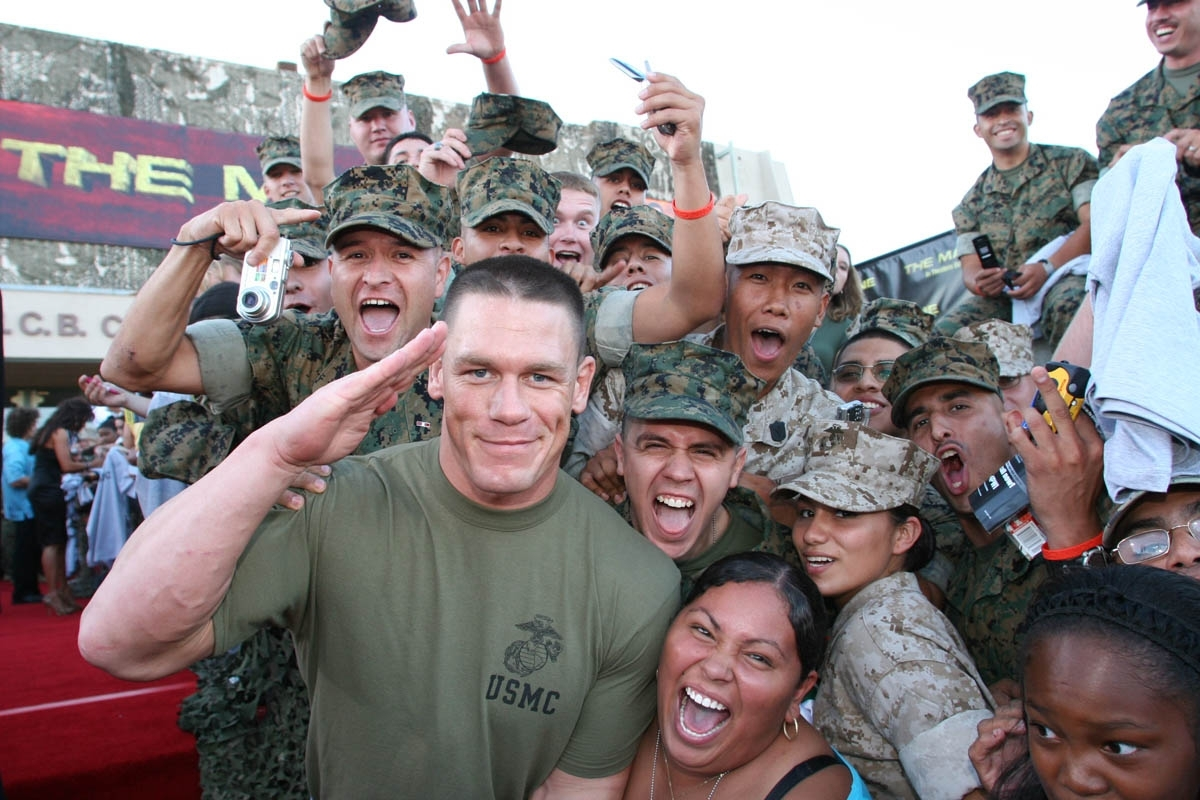
Cena promotes the film at the Camp Pendleton premiere.

The Marine was originally written with Al Pacino in mind for the part of criminal Rome, with Stone Cold Steve Austin as hero Triton. After Austin and WWE parted ways in 2004, Randy Orton was set to be the main character. Orton turned down the role because of his bad conduct discharge from the Marines in the late 1990s, and was replaced by John Cena. Pacino turned down the role of Rome due to the low salary offered. After Pacino turned it down, Ray Liotta was considered for the role of Rome, but Robert Patrick got the part instead.

Principal photography for the film was actually shot and completed in 2004. In order to cover for John Cena's absence from WWE events, a storyline was written after Carlito beat Cena for the WWE United States Championship, saying that he was stabbed by Carlito's bodyguard, Jesús, and was taking time off to recover.

Filming was done at Movie World Studios in Gold Coast, Queensland, Australia. The Marine Base was filmed at Bond University. The part in which skyscrapers are shown is the downtown area of Brisbane, Queensland, Australia. Other footage was shot in bush land surrounding Brisbane. The opening segment of the downtown scenes was filmed in Calgary, Alberta, Canada. Cena was approached by Vince McMahon to do the movie, which he accepted for outside fame. On making the movie he said "I enjoyed the business plan, I didn't enjoy the experience".

== Release ==
=== Home media ===
The film was released on DVD on January 30, 2007, which featured the "rated" version and the "unrated" version. The Blu-ray version was released on February 13, 2007, with a DTS-HD Lossless Master Audio 5.1 track and a 1080p HD transfer. The DVD grossed $27.3 million in domestic video sales.

== Reception ==
=== Box office ===
In its first weekend, the film made approximately $7.1 million at the United States box office. In its first weekend, it placed #6 domestically. After a total of ten weeks in theaters, the film grossed $18.8 million domestically.

=== Critical response ===
On the review aggregator website Rotten Tomatoes, 17% of 46 critics' reviews are positive, with an average rating of 3.9/10. The website's consensus reads: "Overblown in every possible way, The Marine is either so bad it's good or just really, really bad." Metacritic, which uses a weighted average, assigned the film a score of 45 out of 100, based on 14 critics, indicating "mixed or average" reviews. Audiences polled by CinemaScore gave the film an average grade of "B+" on an A+ to F scale.

== Sequels ==
The film has spawned five direct-to-video sequels:

- The Marine 2, featuring Ted DiBiase Jr. in the main role, released on December 29, 2009
- The Marine 3: Homefront, released on March 5, 2013
- The Marine 4: Moving Target, released on April 21, 2015
- The Marine 5: Battleground, released on April 25, 2017
- The Marine 6: Close Quarters, released on November 13, 2018,

The last four sequels have starred professional wrestler Mike "The Miz" Mizanin in the role of Jake Carter.
