= Cannonball (British game show) =

- Genre: Game show
- Presented by: Andrew Flintoff
- Starring: Frankie Bridge; Radzi Chinyanganya; Ryan Hand; Maya Jama
- Country of origin: United Kingdom
- Original language: English
- No. of series: 1
- No. of episodes: 8

Production
- Running time: 60 minutes (inc. adverts)
- Production companies: Potato and Talpa

Original release
- Network: ITV
- Release: 2 September – 31 December 2017

Related
- Australian version American version

Cannonball is a British game show, hosted by Andrew "Freddie" Flintoff with Frankie Bridge, Radzi Chinyanganya, Ryan Hand and Maya Jama as poolside reporters, which first aired on 2 September 2017 on ITV. The show features 24 contestants of all ages taking on four games in a bid to win gold, silver and bronze medals. The top three contestants with the most medals go through to the final to play for the Cannonball Cup. Flintoff is the main presenter and narrator, whilst Bridge, Chinyanganya, Hand and Jama are down by the games speaking to the contestants.

== Format ==
The format for the show is a franchise that originated in the Netherlands by Talpa, which has also been produced in Australia. The British version started filming in Valletta, Malta from late April 2017.

=== Qualifying rounds ===
- Blob: One or two people weighing two and a half times the person's body weight jumps from a tower onto an inflatable blob. The aim is to get as high as possible.
- Knockout: Contestants roll down a ramp wearing an inflatable ball suit, and they must knock over as many bowling pins as they can.
- Skimmer: Two contestants at a time go down a 14-meter slide on body boards. The aim is to get the finish line the quickest.
- Jump: Two contestants at a time go down a 14-meter ramp on body boards. The aim is to achieve the greatest distance in the air.

=== The Final: Swing to Win ===
The final is split into three rounds:

- Round 1: Swing from a 9-meter high podium into a target made up of 150,000 table tennis balls coloured by lights. There are five colours, with each colour getting smaller but representing more points. Purple is worth 1 point, white is worth 2, green is worth 3, blue is worth 4 and yellow is worth 5 points.
- Round 2: It's the same as before, but this time the bullseye (yellow) is moving across the target.
- Round 3: It's the same as before, but this time all the coloured circles move around and the yellow bullseye is worth 10 points.

== Broadcast history ==
=== Series ===
Series	Start date	End date	Episodes
1	2 September 2017	31 December 2017	10

=== Specials ===
Date	Title
24 December 2017	Christmas Special
31 December 2017	Splash Hits

== U.S. version ==
An American version of Cannonball, simulcast on the USA Network and NBC, premiered on June 29, 2020. It is hosted by WWE wrestler The Miz and former Entertainment Tonight correspondent Rocsi Diaz, with comedian Simon Gibson as the sideline reporter.

== Reception ==
Sam Wollaston for The Guardian gave it a positive review saying "ITV's new water-park show may lack the sophistication of BBC's Total Wipeout – but when it comes to stripping people of their dignity, it wins hands down."
