= Cannonball (American game show) =

American game show

- Genre: Game show
- Presented by: Mike Mizanin; Rocsi Diaz; Simon Gibson
- Country of origin: United States
- Original language: English
- No. of series: 2
- No. of episodes: 10

Production
- Executive producers: John de Mol; Bernie Schaeffer; Keith Geller; Shye Sutherland; Stijn Bakkers
- Production companies: ITV Entertainment; Talpa Media USA

Original release
- Network: USA Network
- Release: July 9 – September 3, 2020

Related
- British version Australian version

Cannonball is an American game show that aired on the USA Network from July 9 to September 3, 2020. Inspired by the British series of the same name, it featured 16 contestants from across America facing off in a series of water-based obstacle courses to win a cash prize of $10,000.

The series premiered on NBC as a special preview on June 29, 2020. The simulcast was made permanent shortly after, albeit in the form of a slightly edited broadcast television version, after receiving satisfactory response from audience.

== Episodes ==
No.	Title	Original release date	Prod. code	U.S. viewers (millions)
1	"I Need to Pay My Bills!"	July 9, 2020	101	0.771
2	"The Human Dart"	July 16, 2020	102	0.592
3	"Dare to Cannonball"	July 23, 2020	103	0.561
4	"Cannonballs and Mullets"	July 30, 2020	104	0.565
5	"Thrills, Spills and A Cat Daddy"	August 6, 2020	105	0.570
6	"Swimming with Socks"	August 13, 2020	106	0.434
7	"Viva el Mustache!"	August 13, 2020	107	0.434
8	"Tiny Weenie Mankini"	August 20, 2020	108	0.576
9	"Cannonballed"	August 27, 2020	109	0.526
10	"When Ducks Attack"	September 3, 2020	110	0.554
11	"Sink or Swim"	September 10, 2020	111	0.554
12	"Cannonball into Cannonball Bay"	September 10, 2020	112	0.863

== Production ==
The series was ordered at the USA network on July 17, 2019, with a 10 episode order. On January 14, 2020, it was announced that The Miz would promulgate the play-by-play, Rocsi Diaz would provide color commentary, and that comedian Simon Gibson would act as the sideline reporter.

Filming on the series took place at the Hansen Dam Recreation Park in Los Angeles, California. All events took place in Cannonball Bay.

== Reception ==
=== NBC ratings ===
Viewership and ratings per episode of Cannonball
No.	Title	Air date	Rating/share (18–49)	Viewers (millions)	DVR (18–49)	DVR viewers (millions)	Total (18–49)	Total viewers (millions)
1	"Cannonballs and Mullets: Network Cut"	June 29, 2020	0.6/4	2.65	0.1	0.28	0.7	2.94
2	"Viva El Moustache!: Network Cut"	July 12, 2020	0.4/3	1.83	0.0	0.17	0.4	2.00
3	"When Ducks Attack: Network Cut"	July 19, 2020	0.3/2	2.09	0.1	0.15	0.4	2.24
4	"The Human Dart: Network Cut"	July 26, 2020	0.3/2	1.74	0.0	0.07	0.3	1.81
5	"Dare to Cannonball: Network Cut"	August 2, 2020	0.4/3	2.07	0.0	0.12	0.4	2.19
6	"Thrills, Spills and A Cat Daddy: Network Cut"	August 16, 2020	0.4/3	1.88	0.0	0.09	0.4	1.97
7	"Swimming with Socks: Network Cut"	August 23, 2020	0.4/3	1.93	0.0	0.08	0.4	2.00
8	"Tiny Weenie Mankini: Network Cut"	August 30, 2020	0.4/3	1.62	0.0	0.07	0.4	1.69
9	"Cannonballed: Network Cut"	September 6, 2020	0.3/3	1.52	0.0	0.08	0.3	1.60
