= Safe House (Supernatural) =

- Supernatural episode
- Episode no.: Season 11; Episode 16
- Directed by: Stefan Pleszczynski
- Written by: Robbie Thompson
- Cinematography by: Serge Ladouceur
- Editing by: Donald L. Koch
- Production code: 4X6266
- Original air date: March 23, 2016
- Running time: 42 minutes

Guest appearances
- Jim Beaver as Bobby Singer (special guest star); Steven Williams as Rufus Turner

Episode chronology
← Previous "Beyond the Mat"	Next → "Red Meat"
- Supernatural season 11

"Safe House" is the sixteenth episode of the paranormal drama television series Supernatural's season 11, and the 234th overall. The episode was written by co-executive producer Robbie Thompson and directed by Stefan Pleszczynski. It was first broadcast on March 23, 2016, on The CW.

== Plot ==
A woman, Naoki Himura, is scraping old wallpaper in her new house when she hears a scream and runs up to her daughter's bedroom. The girl, Kat, tells her mother that there is something bad in the house, and complains about how cold her room is. After the mother leaves to get her a glass of water, the lights in Kat's room go out and her door slams shut. Kat hides under her bed, watching the shadow of someone walking in front of her door. The door is suddenly opened, followed by a pale hand snatching Kat away.

After getting no information on Castiel or Amara, Sam and Dean decide to take up the case of a little girl who went into coma and the only sign of any trauma is a handprint on her ankle.

On reaching Grand Rapids, Michigan, Sam and Dean realize that Rufus Turner and Bobby Singer worked the same case a couple of years ago and consult Bobby's journal but it doesn't contain any information about what they were hunting.

In the past, Rufus and Bobby argue over the case. Bobby believes it's a simple ghost case while Rufus now thinks it's a baku. They bet a bottle of Johnnie Walker Blue Label Whisky on it, then head off to dig up some bones. On two separate nights, two pairs of hunters are digging up the same graves. Sam and Dean open the first casket and find that the bones have already been burned. They dig up the second grave and find that the bones have been burned as well. They come to the conclusion that they're not hunting a ghost after all.

After the mother is also attacked and goes into a coma, the brothers, after consulting the lore find that they are dealing with a soul eater. Bobby and Rufus figure it out too. While Bobby and Rufus can't find a way to kill the creature, Bobby had previously worked a case in Tennessee where he fought what he now realizes is a soul eater and he was able to trap it. In the present, the Winchesters realize that Naoki broke Bobby and Rufus' sigil while redecorating and accidentally released the soul eater. In the Men of Letters archives, Sam finds a second sigil that can kill the soul eater, but one of them must enter the soul eater's nest to paint the sigil there at the same time it is painted in the house.

In the past, Bobby and Rufus begin painting the sigil, only for Bobby to come under attack and get dragged to the nest where he has visions of the Winchesters dead and meets the young boy taken by the soul eater at the beginning of his case. He is soon possessed by the soul eater and used to attack Rufus. Rufus manages to subdue the possessed Bobby and finish the sigil, trapping the soul eater and sealing its nest.

In the present, as Sam works on his own sigil, Dean purposefully goads the soul eater into dragging him into its nest where he meets Kat. Dean completes his sigil, but is possessed by the soul eater to attack Sam. The soul eater shows knowledge of the Darkness and warns Sam that Dean is driven to go to the Darkness. Sam subdues the possessed Dean and completes his sigil, killing the soul eater. Inside of the nest, the souls of all of its victims are released to their final rest or their bodies if they are still alive. Watching the souls disappear, Dean and Bobby briefly encounter each other before being returned to their own bodies in their respective time periods.

In the past, Bobby puts up wallpaper to cover the trap sigil while Rufus check on the family to discover that they are now okay. Bobby is left worried by the implications of his encounter with Dean and how everything seems to have ended too neatly. In his car, Bobby finds a bottle of Johnny Walker Blue from Rufus (later discovered by Sam and Jody Mills in season 7's Time after Time) and begins to write about the case in his journal before being interrupted by a call from Dean. At Dean's request, Bobby heads off to check on a lead on Lilith.

In the present, the Winchesters find that Naoki and Kat are awake as well while Dean speculates on whether or not he actually saw Bobby in the nest, a place that exists outside of time and space, making it theoretically possible. Departing, Sam and Dean decide to revisit Bobby's old soul eater case in Tennessee and finish it for him by killing the soul eater that he had trapped there.

== Reception ==
=== Viewers ===
The episode was watched by 1.69 million viewers with a 0.6/2 share among adults aged 18 to 49. This was an 8% decrease in viewership from the previous episode, which was watched by 1.85 million viewers. 0.6 percent of all households with televisions watched the episode, while 2 percent of all households watching television at that time watched it. Supernatural ranked as the second most watched program on The CW in the day, behind Arrow.

=== Critical reviews ===
Professional ratings
Review scores
Source	Rating
IGN	8
TV Fanatic	4.8/5 stars
TV Overmind	3.8/5 stars

"Safe House" received positive reviews. Matt Fowler of IGN gave the episode a "great" 8 out of 10 and wrote in his verdict," "Safe House" gave us a nice Bobby story. One where he was allowed to stay dead and not come back in a cheap way to saddle up next to Sam and Dean. Where he could be a hunter and crack wise with Rufus while still lending the episode a nice emotional lift. Sam and Dean are more or less alone these days, but this story made them feel connected to one of their past partners. In a way that made this regular style monster mash feel a bit elevated.""

MaryAnn Sleasman of TV.com wrote, "Okay, so "Safe House" might have been filler—and by "might" I mean "definitely"—but it was such good filler that I'm willing to let that one slide. Sam and Dean even mocked their avoidance of this latest version of the apocalypse. The way to my heart, other than being ridiculously attractive, is through self-deprecation and, on TV, self-awareness and the occasional parody. "Safe House" featured some genuinely funny moments, a welcome reappearance of two of Supernatural's most dearly departed elder statesmen, and some really swell directorial decisions with those seamless parallels and throwbacks."

Hunter Bishop of TV Overmind wrote, "This was a fun, exciting, and clever episode of Supernatural. It’s almost unfair, really; time travel and dealing with being outside of reality are two things that I think about often. This is the kind of story that I come to fantasy shows for. Unfortunately, that doesn’t leave me with a lot to say. This was an interesting, engaging episode of both Supernatural and television. There are a lot worse things you could be doing or watching than this.""

Sean McKenna of "TV Fanatic" wrote, "This was an enjoyable hour, especially because of Rufus and Bobby, but it was the mix of past and present cases while incorporating the parallels (with some excellent editing) that made it far more than just a typical one-off episode.""
