= Beyond the Mat (Supernatural) =

- Supernatural episode
- Episode no.: Season 11; Episode 15
- Directed by: Jerry Wanek
- Written by: John Bring; Andrew Dabb
- Cinematography by: Serge Ladouceur
- Editing by: James Pickel
- Production code: 4X6265
- Original air date: February 24, 2016
- Running time: 42 minutes

Guest appearances
- Aleks Paunovic as Gunner Lawless; Jackie Debatin as Rio; Mike 'The Miz' Mizanin as Shawn Harley; Aiden Kahn as Duke

Episode chronology
← Previous "The Vessel"	Next → "Safe House"
- Supernatural season 11

"Beyond the Mat" is the 15th episode of the paranormal drama television series Supernatural's season 11, and the 233rd overall. The episode was written by John Bring and co-executive producer Andrew Dabb and directed by Jerry Wanek. It was first broadcast on February 24, 2016 on The CW. In the episode, Sam and Dean investigate the case of the death of one of their favorite wrestlers, which may involve another wrestler.

The episode received generally positive reviews with critics praising the humor and the guest stars.

== Plot ==
After one of their favorite wrestlers apparently commits suicide, Sam (Jared Padalecki) and Dean (Jensen Ackles) go to pay their respects only for a man at the wrestling show to get murdered with a strange symbol etched into his body. The two quickly figure out that they are dealing with a demon who is collecting souls, but find that none of the wrestlers are possessed.

One of the wrestlers, Harley (Mike "The Miz" Mizanin), is kidnapped by one of his fellow wrestlers, Gunner Lawless (Aleks Paunovic), who is working for a crossroads demon who is collecting souls to create his own "nest egg" with the appearance of the Darkness and the return of Lucifer. The demon overpowers the Winchesters and orders Lawless to kill Dean. Lawless explains that he had made a deal ten years before and the demon had promised to spare his life if he did its bidding.

Dean is able to convince Lawless to help and Lawless frees Dean and kills the demon. Sam and Dean leave as Lawless faces the hellhounds now after him and Dean is now more determined than ever to stop Lucifer and Amara and save Castiel. At the same time, Lucifer (Misha Collins) searches for another Hand of God with no luck. Crowley (Mark A. Sheppard) escapes with the help of another demon and leads her to where he has stashed the Rod of Aaron. The demon turns out to be working for Lucifer, but Crowley expends the Rod's power trying to kill Lucifer and is forced to flee.

== Reception ==
=== Viewers ===
The episode was watched by 1.85 million viewers with a 0.7/2 share among adults aged 18 to 49. This was a 7% decrease in viewership from the previous episode, which was watched by 1.98 million viewers from a 0.8/2 share in the 18-49 demographics. 0.7 percent of all households with televisions watched the episode, while 2 percent of all households watching television at that time watched it. Supernatural ranked as the second most watched program on The CW in the day, behind Arrow.

=== Critical reviews ===
Professional ratings
Review scores
Source	Rating
IGN	8.0
TV Fanatic	3.0/5
TV Overmind	2.5/5.0 stars

"Beyond the Mat" received generally positive reviews from critics. Matt Fowler of IGN gave the episode a "great" 8.0 out of 10 and wrote in her verdict, "'Beyond the Mat' was sort of awkwardly forced on us (the brothers once again had to go do something - anything - due to dead ends and cabin fever), but it still managed to make its own fun. The demon murder plot sort of fizzled, but the Winchester's shared love of wrestling was enough to save it. And The Miz was a good hand too."

Hunter Bishop of TV Overmind gave the episode a 2.5-star rating out of 5 and wrote, "Jared and Jensen were the best parts, and they made an unremarkable episode bearable. The look Sam gives as a tequila-sloshwed Dean struggles to his feet is priceless. Jensen killed it with his child-like desires at the wrestling match. Jared's line read about Dean describing their jobs was absolutely perfect. This is the most functional episode of TV ever made. It marches towards its conclusion with inevitability, and gets there in a believable fashion. But that’s about at all it did. It's a long season. They can’t all be home runs."

Samantha Highfill of EW stated: "Well, if you were hoping for more of Casifer, you got it. And if you were hoping to watch Sam and Dean fanboy out... you got that, too. Specifically, Casifer said 'phallic,' and Sam and Dean got to remember a time in their childhood when they did something fun with their father. So I'm going to call this week a win."

Sean McKenna from TV Fanatic, gave a 3-star rating out of 5, stating: "This was a fair episode, but there wasn't really anything that had me overly excited. If anything, I'm pleased to see the Hand of God story continue and glad that Sam and Dean got to have a little fun."

MaryAnn Sleasman of TV.com wrote, "Nope, nope, nope. 'Beyond the Mat' may have given us fanboy Winchesters, and it may have busted Crowley out of his kennel, but with an awkward ending and a plot that literally went nowhere, I can't say that this was the note Supernatural needed to go out on for its mini-hiatus. It's true that we can't get enough nuggets of Winchester childhood trauma, and the realization that their's [sic] was a nauseating cross between Here Comes Honey Boo Boo, Doomsday Preppers, and Ghost Adventures (or, as I like to call it, Ghost Hunting for Brahs) is both heartbreaking and hilarious, but Sam and Dean's strolls down memory lane have been done before—and done better—with enough frequency that not even our favorite form of filler could save this... this this."

Becky Lea of Den of Geek wrote, "An episode of two halves, Beyond The Mat manages to succeed more than it fails, but the feeling that the season has been stalling somewhat (Love Hurts was especially guilty of this) continues. Still, it's probably worth it for the sight of Dean trying out his wrestling moves."
