= Cannonball (Australian game show) =

- Created by: Talpa Media
- Presented by: Tim Ross; Ben Mingay; Rachael Finch
- Country of origin: Australia
- Original language: English
- No. of seasons: 1
- No. of episodes: 4

Production
- Production location: Sydney International Regatta Centre, Penrith
- Production company: ITV Studios Australia

Original release
- Network: Seven Network
- Release: 27 September 2017 – 2017

Related
- Cannonball (United Kingdom)

Cannonball is an Australian reality television game show that premiered on the Seven Network on 27 September 2017. It is hosted by Tim Ross and Ben Mingay, along with Rachael Finch and features contestants competing with celebrities. The water-based game show involves 15 couples competing on a lake attempting to jump the highest, slide the furthest and fly the highest.

The format for the show is a franchise that originated in the Netherlands by Talpa. The four-episode series is produced by ITV Studios Australia and filmed at the Sydney International Regatta Centre in Penrith, New South Wales, in Sydney's western suburbs.

== Format ==
The competition involves a total of 36 teams of two competing in high level water games for a chance to win two new Suzuki Vitaras and over $35,000 in cash. The top two team in each episode will go to the finals with the best team of the day getting a prize of $5,000

Several celebrity participants competed including former My Kitchen Rules contestants Ash Pollard, Luciano Ippoliti, Alex Ebert and Gareth Cochran. Two celebrities appear on each episode doing the same challenges, and what ever team there score get the close to that team get $500.

== Ratings ==
The premiere episode was met with disappointing ratings. As a result, the second episode of the series was rescheduled to late Friday night. It is unknown if the final two episodes made it to air.

| No. | Title | Air date | Timeslot | Overnight ratings | | Ref(s) |
| No. | Title | Air date | Timeslot | Viewers | Rank | Ref(s) |
|---|---|---|---|---|---|---|
| 1 | Episode 1 | 27 September 2017 | Wednesday 7:30pm | 513,000 | 16 | |
| 2 | Episode 2 | 29 September 2017 | Friday 10:45pm | Unknown | —N/a | |
| 3 | Episode 3 | Unknown | Unknown | Unknown | —N/a | |
| 4 | Episode 4 | Unknown | Unknown | Unknown | —N/a | |

== See also ==
- Wipeout
- It's a Knockout
- Celebrity Splash!
