= The Miz =

American wrestler and media personality (born 1980)

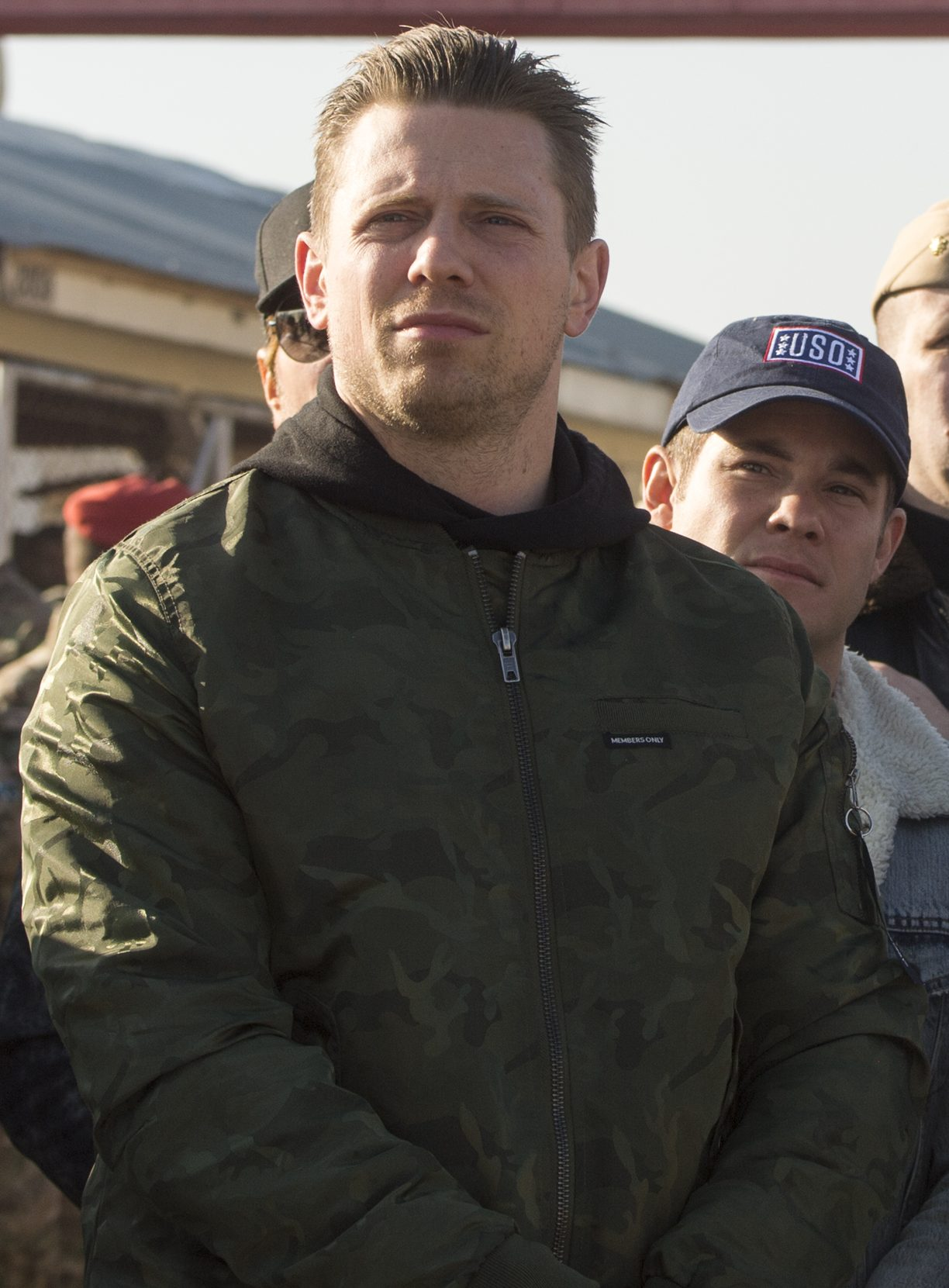
- The Miz in 2017
- Born: Michael Gregory Mizanin; October 8, 1980 (age 46); Parma, Ohio, U.S.
- Occupations: Professional wrestler; television personality; actor
- Years active: 2001–present
- Spouse: Maryse Ouellet (m. 2014)
- Children: 2
- Professional wrestling career
- Ring name(s): Calgary Kid; Mike Mizanin; The Miz; Mike The Miz
- Billed height: 6 ft 2 in (188 cm)
- Billed weight: 221 lb (100 kg)
- Billed from: Calgary, Alberta, Canada; Cleveland, Ohio; Hollywood, California
- Trained by: Al Snow; Bill DeMott; Ultimate Pro Wrestling
- Debut: August 1, 2003

Michael Gregory Mizanin (born October 8, 1980), better known by his ring name the Miz, is an American professional wrestler, actor, and television personality. As a wrestler, he has been signed to WWE since 2004, where he performs on the SmackDown brand.

Mizanin first gained fame as a reality television participant, appearing on The Real World: Back to New York in 2001 and its spin-off, Real World/Road Rules Challenge, from 2002 to 2005. He won Battle of the Seasons and The Inferno II. He reached the final of Battle of the Network Reality Stars, and won a Reality Stars-themed episode of Fear Factor in 2006. After finishing as runner-up in the fourth season of Tough Enough and subsequently launching his wrestling career, Mizanin appeared on Diva Search, Total Divas, Tough Enough, and hosted several seasons of The Challenge. He also starred in the reality television series Miz & Mrs. alongside his wife, Maryse Ouellet, and has starred in films produced by WWE Studios, namely The Marine franchise, Christmas Bounty (2013), and Santa's Little Helper (2015).

Mizanin signed with WWE in 2004 and has been on the main roster full time since 2006. He has won numerous championships, including the WWE Championship twice and the Intercontinental Championship eight times. He is WWE's 25th Triple Crown Champion and 14th Grand Slam Champion, as well as the first wrestler to accomplish the latter twice under the revised 2015 format. He is the first, and to date only, WWE wrestler to simultaneously hold three championships in WWE, holding the United States Championship, the WWE Tag Team Championship, and the World Tag Team Championship (the latter two as part of the Unified WWE Tag Team Championship) in 2010. He also won the 2010 Money in the Bank ladder match. Among WWE's most prolific pay-per-view event performers, Mizanin headlined WrestleMania XXVII in 2011, and was ranked No. 1 on Pro Wrestling Illustrated's annual PWI 500 list that same year.

== Early life ==
Michael Gregory Mizanin was born in Parma, Ohio, on October 8, 1980. His parents are divorced; he has a step-father and two half-siblings. He attended Normandy High School, where he was the captain of the basketball and cross country teams, participated in swimming, was a member of the student government, and edited the yearbook. He then attended Miami University, where he was a member of the Theta Chi fraternity and studied business at the Richard T. Farmer School of Business before being chosen as a cast member on The Real World (2001).

== Television career ==
=== Reality television ===
==== Rise to fame ====
Mizanin dropped out of college, where he was pursuing a degree in business, in order to appear on the 10th season of MTV's reality television program The Real World in 2001. He went on to appear in multiple seasons of its spin-off series, Real World/Road Rules Challenge, along with contestants from both Road Rules and The Real World, including Battle of the Seasons, The Gauntlet, The Inferno, Battle of the Sexes 2 and The Inferno 2. Except for Battle of the Sexes 2, Mizanin made it to the end of all the Challenges on which he competed and won both Battle of the Seasons and The Inferno 2.

It was during an episode of The Real World that Mizanin first displayed an alter ego known as the Miz. In contrast to Mizanin's usually placid demeanor, the Miz was angry, combative and headstrong. Mizanin later realized that the Miz would make an excellent professional wrestling gimmick.

In 2004, he appeared on the Bravo reality show Battle of the Network Reality Stars, in which his team finished second. Mizanin was also a contestant in the "Reality Stars" episode of Fear Factor. His partner was his former girlfriend and castmate, Trishelle Cannatella, and the two won the competition. In April 2007, he appeared on the game show Identity, where he appeared as a stranger, and contestant John Kim correctly identified his identity as a professional wrestler by the odd way he added "Miz-" before most words. On October 5, 2011, Miz starred in an episode of H8R.

==== Return to MTV ====
After a seven-year-long absence from The Challenge, Mizanin returned to the reality show on April 4, 2012, as the host of The Battle of the Exes season finale event and reunion special. It marked the first time he appeared on the series since becoming a main-event WWE Superstar. Since then, he had become a mainstay reunion host as well as the host of The Challenge: Champs vs. Stars mini-series.

==== USA Network ====
In 2018, Mizanin and his wife Maryse began starring in a USA Network reality television series titled Miz & Mrs.. In 2020, he starred on a second show on USA, serving as host of the reality game show Cannonball.

=== Other television appearances ===
In 2008, Mizanin appeared on the Sci Fi reality series Ghost Hunters Live as a guest investigator. In 2009, Mizanin appeared on two episodes of Are You Smarter than a 5th Grader?, which were both aired on September 29. He appeared on an episode of Destroy Build Destroy on March 3, 2010. He also appeared as a guest star in a March 2012 episode of Psych. On March 31, Mizanin appeared in the first ever Slime Wrestling World Championship at the Nickelodeon Kids' Choice Awards, losing to Big Show and therefore being thrown into a tub of slime. In 2012, Mizanin appeared on the Disney XD show Pair of Kings as a guest star. In 2013, Miz along with Francia Raisa, were in a movie together called Christmas Bounty.

In September 2021, Mizanin was announced as one of the celebrities competing on the thirtieth season of Dancing with the Stars. He and his partner Witney Carson were the seventh couple to be eliminated, ultimately placing 9th. In 2022, Mizanin was briefly featured in archival footage in the Netflix docuseries Trainwreck: Woodstock '99.

On May 1, 2023, Mizanan appeared as part of a team with Alexa Bliss on the American show That's My Jam on NBC hosted by Jimmy Fallon. They won the final round, therefore the game and the money was donated to children's charities.

== Professional wrestling career ==
=== Ultimate Pro Wrestling (2003–2004) ===
Pursuing the goal of becoming a professional wrestler, Mizanin joined Ultimate Pro Wrestling (UPW), where he trained in the Ultimate University. He made his in-ring debut in 2003 as the Miz. During his time with UPW, the Miz competed in UPW's Mat War's tournament, making it to the finals before losing to Tony Stradlin.

=== World Wrestling Entertainment/WWE (2004–present) ===
==== Tough Enough and developmental territories (2004–2006) ====
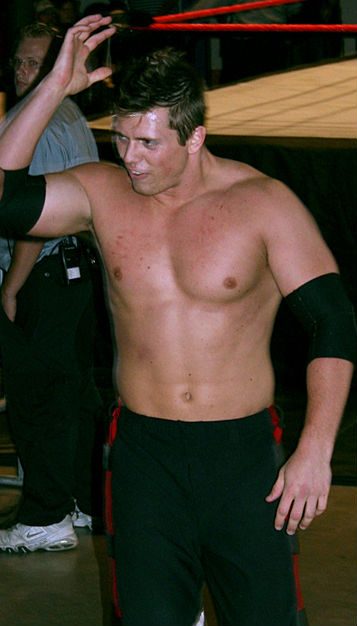
The Miz debuted in WWE as a participant of the 2004 Tough Enough

In October 2004, Mike Mizanin entered the fourth season of Tough Enough, a televised competition which awarded the winner a World Wrestling Entertainment (WWE) contract and US$1,000,000. Despite coming last in an arm wrestling tournament on November 25, Mizanin outlasted six other wrestlers and reached the final round. At Armageddon on December 12, Mizanin faced the other remaining entrant, Daniel Puder, in a three-round "Dixie Dogfight" (boxing match). Neither man achieved a knockout, and the contest was awarded to Puder on the basis of crowd reaction. On the December 16 episode of SmackDown!, Puder was declared as the winner of Tough Enough by head trainer Al Snow. Despite coming up short on Tough Enough, Mizanin had piqued the interest of WWE and he was eventually offered a developmental contract.

Mizanin was sent to Deep South Wrestling (DSW) to train under Bill DeMott, relocating to McDonough, Georgia in the process. In July 2005, he wrestled two dark matches for WWE, teaming with former Tough Enough champion Matt Cappotelli to face The Highlanders (Robbie and Rory McAllister). On December 1, Mizanin defeated Mike Knox in the finals of a tournament to determine the inaugural Deep South Heavyweight Champion. He continued his partnership with Matt Cappotelli throughout the second half of 2005 in WWE dark matches and house shows until Cappotelli, nominally of Ohio Valley Wrestling (OVW), was diagnosed with a brain tumor after an injury at a taping in December 2005. After Cappotelli's death from brain cancer in June 2018, Miz revealed they were to be called up to the SmackDown roster as a tag team known as Reality Check in 2005, but these plans were halted due to Cappotelli's cancer diagnosis.

On January 3, 2006, it was reported that Mizanin had been transferred to OVW. On the January 18, 2006 OVW TV show, Mizanin made his debut as Miz with a Miz TV segment, where he was shown talking backstage. On the January 28 episode of the OVW television show, the Miz wrestled his first singles match against René Duprée, but lost by countout.

At the February 8 OVW TV taping, Miz and Chris Cage captured the OVW Southern Tag Team Championship, defeating Chet the Jett and Seth Skyfire. On March 19, Deuce Shade defeated Miz in a singles contest to win the championship for his team The Untouchables (Deuce Shade and Domino).

==== Main roster beginnings (2006–2007) ====
From March 7 onwards, a video on WWE's website and vignettes on SmackDown! heralded the Miz debuting on the SmackDown! brand. When Mizanin actually attempted to make his debut on the April 21 episode of SmackDown!, he was in storyline banned from entering the arena by network executive Palmer Canon who told him that he had been "cancelled" before having security escort him from the premises.

The Miz debuted as the host of SmackDown! on June 2, hyping up the crowd at the top of the show. Other duties included backstage interviews and hosting a bikini contest. Starting in July, the Miz, along with Ashley Massaro, hosted the annual Diva Search competition.

After the end of the Diva Search competition, the Miz began wrestling as a villain, making his in-ring debut with a win over Tatanka on the September 1 episode of SmackDown!. Over the next three months, the Miz remained undefeated, defeating such wrestlers as Matt Hardy, Funaki and Scotty 2 Hotty. At the same time, he began a feud with Diva Search winner Layla El, who spurned his advances on more than one occasion, leading to the Miz helping Kristal defeat her in various competitions. However, the Miz and Kristal soon found themselves being stalked by The Boogeyman. This began a feud in which the Boogeyman ended the Miz's winning streak on December 17 at Armageddon.

At Royal Rumble on January 28, 2007, the Miz entered in the Royal Rumble match as the 29th entrant, but only lasted seven seconds before being eliminated by The Great Khali. On the February 2 episode of SmackDown!, the Miz defeated Matt Hardy once again with assistance from Joey Mercury. Following a brief absence from television, the Miz returned on the March 9 episode of SmackDown! to host an interview segment named Miz TV. After the unsuccessful segment, the Miz returned to in-ring competition with a more intense style and began to pick up wins once again.

The Miz was drafted to the ECW brand on June 17 as part of the 2007 supplemental draft. He was absent from the first few weeks of ECW, though he was the subject of backstage mentions between matches and had several short Miz TV Crashes ECW video segments. He made his debut on the July 10 episode of ECW in a match against Nunzio, which he won.

Soon after, the Miz found new managers in Kelly Kelly, Layla El and Brooke Adams. He then began a feud with Balls Mahoney after Kelly Kelly began to fall in love with Mahoney on screen. On the October 2 episode of ECW, it was revealed that the Miz owned the contracts of Kelly Kelly, Layla and Brooke Adams; and he used this excuse to stop Kelly from going out with Mahoney. He was nominated at Cyber Sunday on October 28 to face CM Punk for the ECW Championship. He won the vote, but lost the match. Later that month, he formed a tag team with John Morrison.

==== Teaming with John Morrison (2007–2009) ====
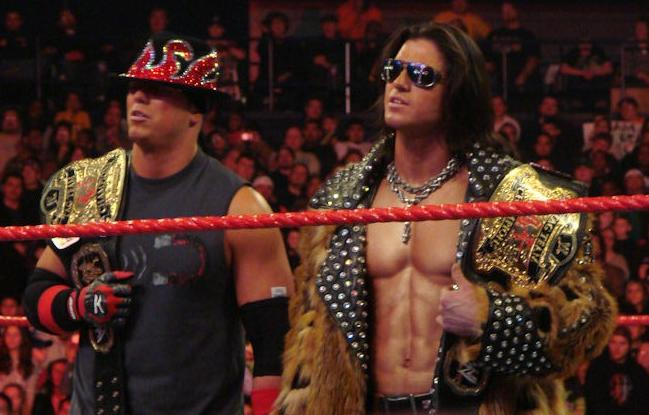
From 2007 to 2009, the Miz spent the majority of that time as either WWE or World Tag Team Champion, teaming with John Morrison

On the November 16 episode of SmackDown!, the Miz became one half of the WWE Tag Team Champions with John Morrison (the former Johnny Nitro) when they defeated Matt Hardy and Montel Vontavious Porter (MVP), giving the Miz his first championship within the company. At Survivor Series two days later, the Miz and Morrison competed in a triple threat match for the ECW Championship, with the champion CM Punk retaining. The team of Morrison and Miz was successful, with WWE giving them a streaming segment on the WWE website named The Dirt Sheet, showing off their promo skills. Morrison and the Miz co-wrote each episode of The Dirt Sheet each week. They dropping the championship to Curt Hawkins and Zack Ryder at the Great American Bash on July 20 in a fatal four-way match, ending their reign at 250 days. Neither the Miz nor Morrison were pinned as Hawkins pinned Jesse to win the titles. The Miz competed in the Championship Scramble for the ECW Championship on September 7 at Unforgiven, which was won by Matt Hardy. The Miz and Morrison soon followed a feud with Cryme Tyme (Shad Gaspard and JTG) as a battle of their webshows, Word Up and The Dirt Sheet. They were voted into a match with, and defeated Cryme Tyme on October 26 at Cyber Sunday. The team also feuded with D-Generation X (DX) (Triple H and Shawn Michaels). On the 800th episode of Raw, the Miz and Morrison competed in a match against DX, and were defeated. The duo joined John "Bradshaw" Layfield (JBL)'s team (which also included Kane and Montel Vontavious Porter) in a losing effort against Shawn Michaels' team (also including Shad Gaspard, JTG, Rey Mysterio and The Great Khali) at Survivor Series on November 23. On December 13, the Miz and Morrison defeated Kofi Kingston and CM Punk to win the World Tag Team Championship during a WWE house show in Hamilton, Ontario, Canada.

In February, the team engaged themselves in a feud with The Colóns (Carlito and Primo). In a dark match at WrestleMania 25 on April 5, they lost the World Tag Team Championship to The Colóns in a lumberjack match to unify the World Tag Team and the WWE Tag Team titles. On the April 13 episode of Raw, the Miz lost a match to Kofi Kingston, which gave the Raw brand a draft pick in the 2009 WWE draft. The pick was then revealed to be the Miz and attacked Morrison, ending their partnership and thus turning John Morrison into a fan favorite.

==== United States Champion (2009–2010) ====
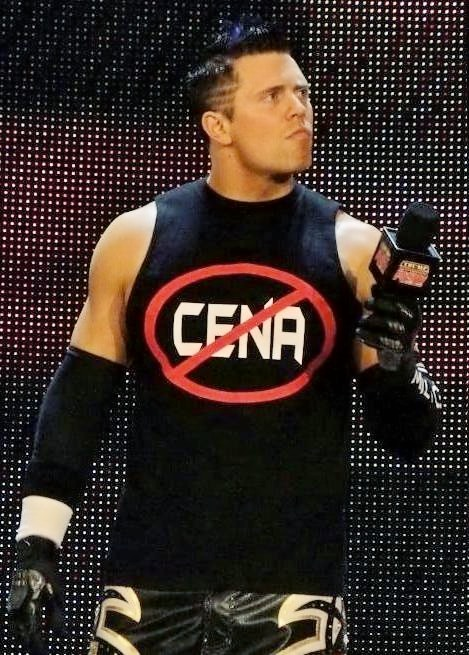
After his split from Morrison, Miz's first singles feud was against John Cena

The Miz challenged John Cena to a match on the April 27 episode of Raw, but as Cena was out due to injury, the Miz claimed an unofficial win via forfeit and continued to do this over the following weeks, until Cena returned and defeated him in a singles match at The Bash in June. Around this time, he developed his new finisher, the Skull-Crushing Finale, and catchphrase: "Because I'm the Miz... and I'm awesome!" On the August 3 episode of Raw, the Miz lost to Cena in a lumberjack match, which meant that, in storyline, he was banned from the Staples Center, the Raw brand and SummerSlam. The following week on August 10, the Miz competed under a mask as The Calgary Kid and won a Contract on Pole match against Eugene, earning a contract in storyline, and revealing himself by removing his mask afterwards.

After changing his in-ring attire from shorts to trunks, the Miz then set his sights on the United States Championship, held by Kofi Kingston. He unsuccessfully challenged for the championship at the Night of Champions (July 26), Breaking Point (September 13) and Hell in a Cell (October 4) pay-per-views, before he won the championship on the October 5 episode of Raw, becoming his first singles championship in WWE. At Bragging Rights on October 25, the Miz was inserted into an interpromotional match against SmackDown's Intercontinental Champion and the Miz's former tag team partner John Morrison, whom he defeated. On November 22 at Survivor Series, the Miz captained a team of five wrestlers which consisted of himself, Dolph Ziggler, Drew McIntyre, Jack Swagger and Sheamus against Team Morrison (captain John Morrison, Evan Bourne, Finlay, Matt Hardy and Shelton Benjamin) in a five-on-five Survivor Series elimination match and once again bested his former partner surviving with McIntyre and Sheamus.

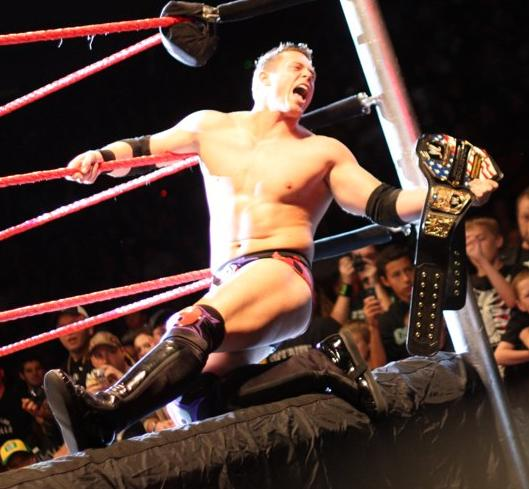
The Miz with the United States Championship, which he held twice during this period

During this time, he gained a new entrance theme "I Came to Play", performed by the band Downstait. The Miz soon began a rivalry with MVP that began with a critically well-received verbal exchange between the two. The two met in an unadvertised match for the United States Championship at the Royal Rumble on January 31, 2010, with the Miz retaining his title, but in the Royal Rumble match itself MVP eliminated both himself and the Miz. Also around this time, the Miz formed a tag team with Big Show — later dubbed "ShoMiz" — and on the February 8 episode of Raw the two defeated D-Generation X (DX) (Shawn Michaels and Triple H) and The Straight Edge Society (CM Punk and Luke Gallows) to become the Unified Tag Team Champions, making the Miz the first wrestler in WWE history to hold three championships at the same time (United States, World Tag Team and WWE Tag Team Championships). At Elimination Chamber on February 21, the Miz again successfully defended his United States Championship against MVP after interference from Big Show, ending their feud. At WrestleMania XXVI on March 28, ShoMiz defeated John Morrison and R-Truth to retain the title again. At Extreme Rules on April 25, ShoMiz took part in a tag team gauntlet match, and made it to the final two teams, but were eliminated by The Hart Dynasty (David Hart Smith and Tyson Kidd). The next night on Raw, ShoMiz lost the Unified Tag Team Championship to The Hart Dynasty, resulting in Big Show turning face by attacking the Miz after the match, bringing an end to the team.

On the May 17 episode of Raw, the Miz lost the United States Championship to Bret Hart, despite Chris Jericho, William Regal and Vladimir Kozlov all attempting to interfere on the Miz's behalf, ending his seven-month reign as champion. At Over the Limit on May 23, the Miz and Jericho challenged The Hart Dynasty for the Unified WWE Tag Team Championship, but lost. On the June 14 episode of Raw, the Miz defeated R-Truth, John Morrison and Zack Ryder in a fatal four-way match to win back the United States Championship for the second time. He retained the championship against R-Truth on June 20 at the Fatal 4-Way pay-per-view.

==== WWE Champion (2010–2011) ====
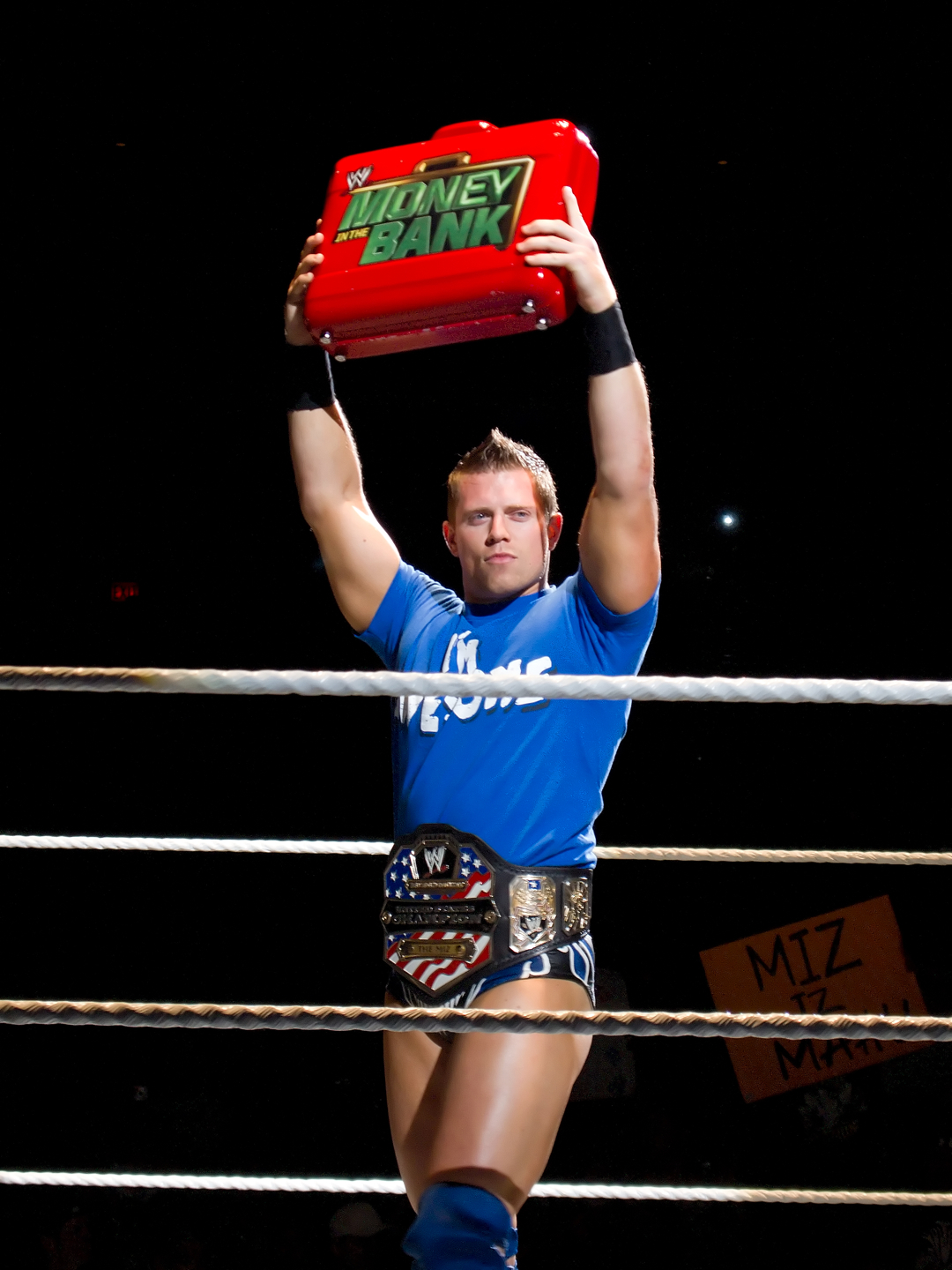
The Miz as United States Champion and Money in the Bank contract holder in August 2010. Miz later cashed in his Money in the Bank contract to win the WWE Championship

On July 18 at Money in the Bank, the Miz won Raw's Money in the Bank ladder match to win a contract for a WWE Championship match that he could utilize at any time. Over the next few weeks, the Miz made various, unsuccessful attempts at cashing in his Money in the Bank contract on the WWE Champion Sheamus. At SummerSlam on August 15, the Miz began a rivalry with his NXT rookie Daniel Bryan, which resulted in a United States Championship match between the two at the Night of Champions event on September 19, in which the Miz dropped the title to Bryan. At Hell in a Cell on October 3, the Miz failed to regain the championship in a triple threat submissions count anywhere match also including John Morrison. At Bragging Rights on October 24, the Miz led Team Raw (which also included R-Truth, Morrison, Santino Marella, Sheamus, CM Punk and Ezekiel Jackson), but they were defeated by Team SmackDown (Alberto Del Rio, Big Show, Edge, Jack Swagger, Kofi Kingston, Rey Mysterio and Tyler Reks).

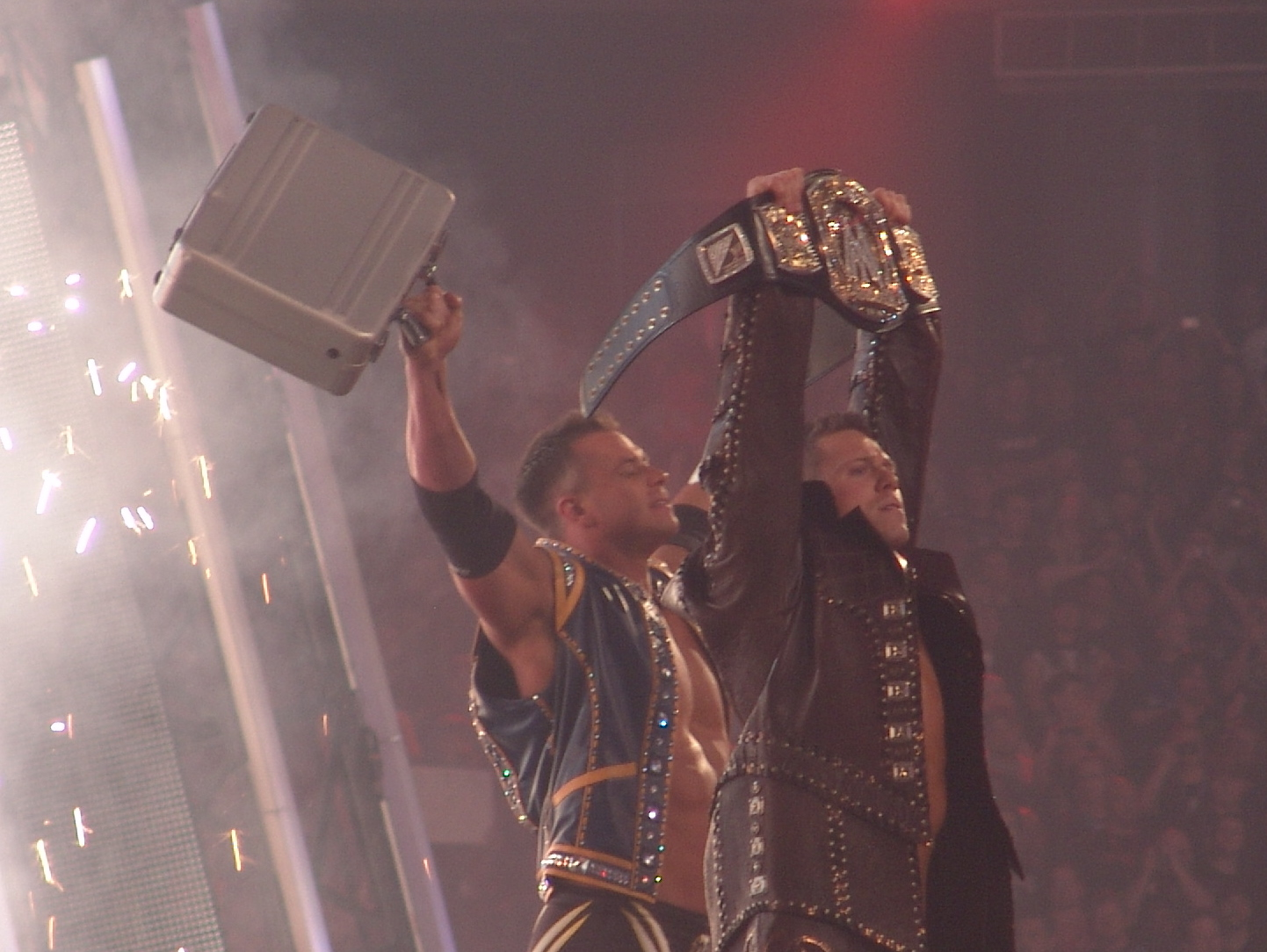
The Miz (right) successfully defended the WWE Championship in the main event of WrestleMania XXVII in April 2011

On the November 22 episode of Raw, the Miz cashed in his Money in the Bank contract following a successful WWE Championship defense by Randy Orton against Wade Barrett and defeated Orton to win his first WWE Championship. The following week, the Miz made his first successful title defense, defeating Jerry "The King" Lawler in a Tables, Ladders and Chairs match after interference from Michael Cole. He successfully defended the championship at the TLC: Tables, Ladders & Chairs pay-per-view on December 19 by defeating Orton in a tables match following interference from Alex Riley. The Miz retained the championship against John Morrison in a falls count anywhere match on the January 3, 2011 episode of Raw, Orton again at Royal Rumble on January 30, (after interference from CM Punk) and Lawler on February 20 at Elimination Chamber. On the Raw after Elimination Chamber, the Miz and John Cena were paired together by the Anonymous Raw General Manager to challenge The Corre (Justin Gabriel and Heath Slater) for the WWE Tag Team Championship. The Miz and Cena were successful in winning the titles, but lost them back to Corre immediately afterward in a rematch after the Miz turned on Cena. This made their 9-minute reign the shortest in the championship's history. The following week, the Miz lost Riley as his apprentice after Cena defeated Riley in a steel cage match with the stipulation that if Cena won, Riley was fired from his job. However, Riley was re-hired in mid-March, this time as the Miz's "Vice President of Corporate Communications". In the main event of WrestleMania XXVII on April 3, the Miz successfully defended the WWE Championship against Cena, following interference from the Rock, who then attacked the Miz afterwards.

At Extreme Rules on May 1, the Miz lost the WWE Championship to Cena in a triple threat steel cage match, also involving John Morrison, ending his reign at 160 days. He had rematches against Cena for the WWE Championship on the May 2 episode of Raw, and in an "I Quit" match at Over the Limit on May 22, but failed to regain the title. The following night on Raw, the Anonymous Raw General Manager denied the Miz's request for another WWE Championship match; the Miz blamed Riley for being unable to regain the championship. Riley then attacked him, turning Riley into a fan favorite. At Capitol Punishment on June 19, the Miz lost to Riley. The Miz also failed to win Raw's Money in the Bank ladder match at the titular event on July 17. After the WWE Championship was declared vacant by Vince McMahon, the Miz entered into a tournament to crown a new champion, defeating Riley and Kofi Kingston to advance to the finals, where he lost to Rey Mysterio. At SummerSlam on August 14, the Miz, R-Truth, and Alberto Del Rio lost to Mysterio, Kingston and Morrison.

==== Awesome Truth (2011–2012) ====
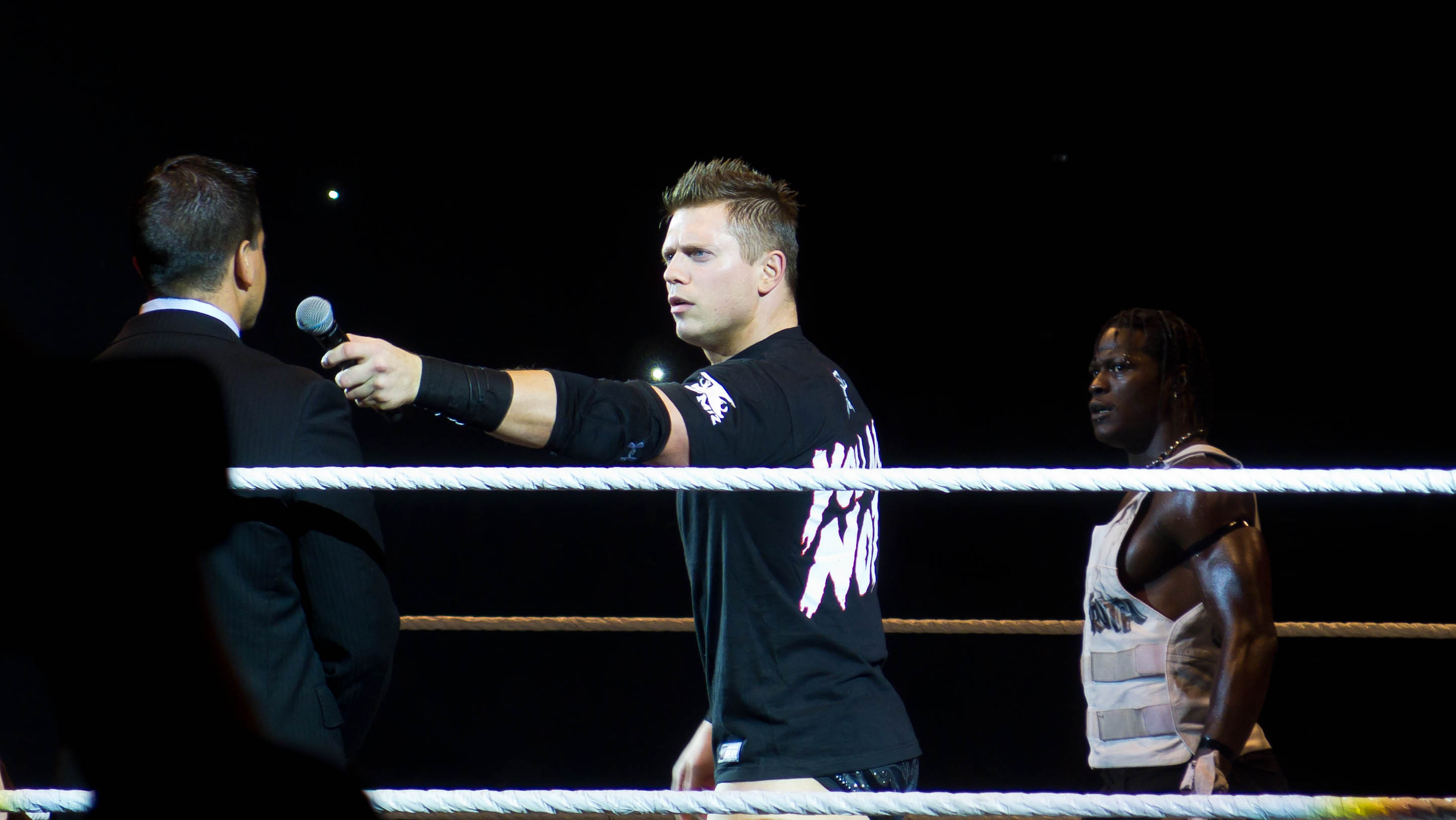
In 2011, Miz was involved in a short-lived tag team with R-Truth (right) known as The Awesome Truth

On the August 22 episode of Raw, the Miz and R-Truth attacked Santino Marella before his match. They then cut a promo agreeing there was a conspiracy in the WWE keeping both of them out of the main event picture, and declared they would, together, seize any future opportunity. They began referring to themselves as "The Awesome Truth". At Night of Champions on September 18, after the referee was distracted while the Miz attempted a pin, the Miz assaulted him, causing Awesome Truth to lose a WWE Tag Team Championship match to Air Boom (Kofi Kingston and Evan Bourne) by disqualification. Seeking retribution, the Miz and R-Truth later attacked both Triple H and CM Punk during their No Disqualification match in the main event. Because of their actions from the previous night, R-Truth and the Miz were fired by Triple H on the September 19 episode of Raw SuperShow. After this, the Miz and R-Truth attacked Triple H, but were thrown out of the building. At the conclusion of the main event match on October 2 at Hell in a Cell, R-Truth and the Miz jumped the barricade wearing black hooded sweatshirts and entered the Hell in a Cell structure as it was being raised. They then used weapons to attack Alberto Del Rio, Punk, John Cena, the WWE officials and camera men while the cell was again lowered. After this, the entire WWE roster led by Triple H came out to find a way into the cell, before New Orleans Police Department officers were able to get the door open and arrest them. The two later posted a video on YouTube apologizing to the fans for their actions. The Miz and R-Truth were reinstated by John Laurinaitis on the October 10 episode of Raw SuperShow. At Vengeance on October 23, the Miz and R-Truth defeated CM Punk and Triple H after interference from Triple H's long time friend Kevin Nash. Later that night they assaulted John Cena during his WWE Championship match with Alberto Del Rio. At Survivor Series on November 20, The Awesome Truth lost to Cena and the Rock. On the November 21 episode of Raw SuperShow, Cena instigated an argument between R-Truth and the Miz, which resulted in the Miz performing a Skull Crushing Finale on the stage on R-Truth. This was a pretext to explain R-Truth's absence during his suspension as a result of his violating of the Wellness Policy.

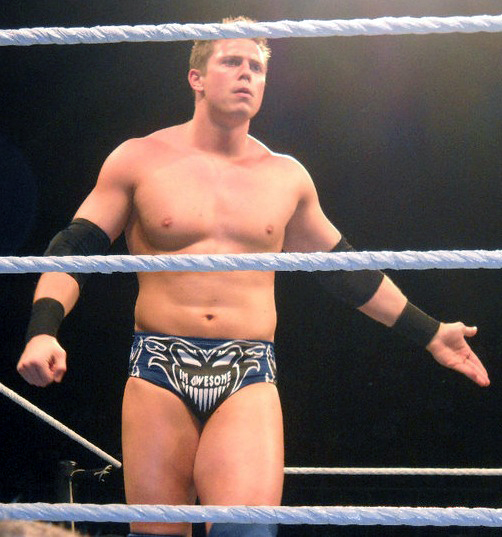
The Miz at a WWE live event in 2011

On the November 28 episode of Raw SuperShow, the Miz defeated John Morrison in a Falls Count Anywhere match after a Skull Crushing Finale on the stage. On the December 5 episode of Raw SuperShow, the Miz qualified for a triple threat Tables, Ladders and Chairs match against Alberto Del Rio and CM Punk at the TLC: Tables, Ladders & Chairs pay-per-view for the WWE Championship on December 18 after a win over Randy Orton via countout, but Punk retained the title. The Miz was the first entrant in the 2012 Royal Rumble match on January 29, eliminating Alex Riley and R-Truth and lasting over 45 minutes before he was eliminated by Big Show. At Elimination Chamber on February 19, the Miz competed for the WWE Championship in the titular match, and lasted until the end of the match before being eliminated by CM Punk.

Desperate for a spot on the card for the upcoming WrestleMania XXVIII event on April 1, he later joined John Laurinaitis' team for the 12-man tag team match after saving Laurinaitis from Santino Marella on the March 26 episode of Raw SuperShow. The Miz picked up the win for Team Johnny after pinning Zack Ryder with the help of Eve, ending his twenty-match losing streak dating back to December 2011. At the Extreme Rules pre-show on April 29, the Miz lost a United States Championship match against Santino Marella. He followed this up by losing a battle royal and a match against Brodus Clay on May 20 at Over the Limit.

==== Intercontinental Champion (2012–2013) ====
After a two-month absence, the Miz returned at Money in the Bank on July 15 as a last-minute participant in the WWE Championship Money in the Bank ladder match, won by John Cena. At Raw 1000, the Miz defeated Christian to win his first Intercontinental Championship, becoming the 25th Triple Crown Champion and a Grand Slam Champion in the process. The Miz successfully defended his championship against Rey Mysterio at SummerSlam on August 19, and in a fatal four-way match against Cody Rhodes, Mysterio, and Sin Cara at Night of Champions on September 16, before losing the championship to Kofi Kingston on the October 17 episode of Main Event ending his reign at 85 days. The Miz failed to regain the title from Kingston in two rematches at Hell in a Cell on October 28 and on the November 6 episode of SmackDown.

On the November 12 episode of Raw, the Miz turned face for the first time since 2006 when he quit CM Punk's team and joined Mick Foley's team at Survivor Series after confronting Paul Heyman. At Survivor Series on November 18, he eliminated Wade Barrett before he was eliminated by Alberto Del Rio; his team went on to lose the match. The Miz teamed up with Alberto Del Rio and The Brooklyn Brawler to defeat 3MB (Drew McIntyre, Heath Slater and Jinder Mahal) at TLC: Tables, Ladders & Chairs on December 16. The Miz then began a feud with United States Champion Antonio Cesaro. During this feud, Ric Flair became his mentor and the Miz adopted the figure-four leglock from Flair as a new finisher. The Miz challenged for Cesaro's United States Championship at the Royal Rumble pre-show on January 27, on February 17 at Elimination Chamber and on the March 1, 2013 episode of SmackDown, but was unsuccessful each time.

The Miz next sought Wade Barrett's Intercontinental Championship. He lost a triple threat match against Barrett and Chris Jericho on the March 18 episode of Raw, but defeated Barrett in a non-title match the following week to earn another shot at the title. He captured the title by defeating Barrett at the WrestleMania 29 pre-show on April 7, only to lose the title back to him the following night on Raw. The Miz was victorious against Cody Rhodes in the Extreme Rules pre-show. The Miz failed to recapture the Intercontinental Championship on June 16 at Payback and Money in the Bank on July 14.

==== Hollywood A-Lister (2013–2016) ====
On August 18, he was the host of SummerSlam, during which he had a run-in with Fandango, beginning a feud between the two. The Miz defeated Fandango on the September 2 episode of Raw and on September 15 at Night of Champions. The following night on Raw, the Miz was assaulted by Randy Orton in front of his parents, resulting in a storyline injury. When the Miz returned in October, he quickly lost to Orton. The Miz started a feud with Kofi Kingston, defeating him on the Survivor Series pre-show on November 24, but losing a no-disqualification match at TLC: Tables, Ladders & Chairs on December 15 to end their feud. At Royal Rumble on January 26, 2014, the Miz entered the Royal Rumble match at number 18, lasting 12 minutes before being eliminated by Luke Harper. At WrestleMania XXX on April 6, he participated in the André the Giant Memorial Battle Royal, but was eliminated by Santino Marella.

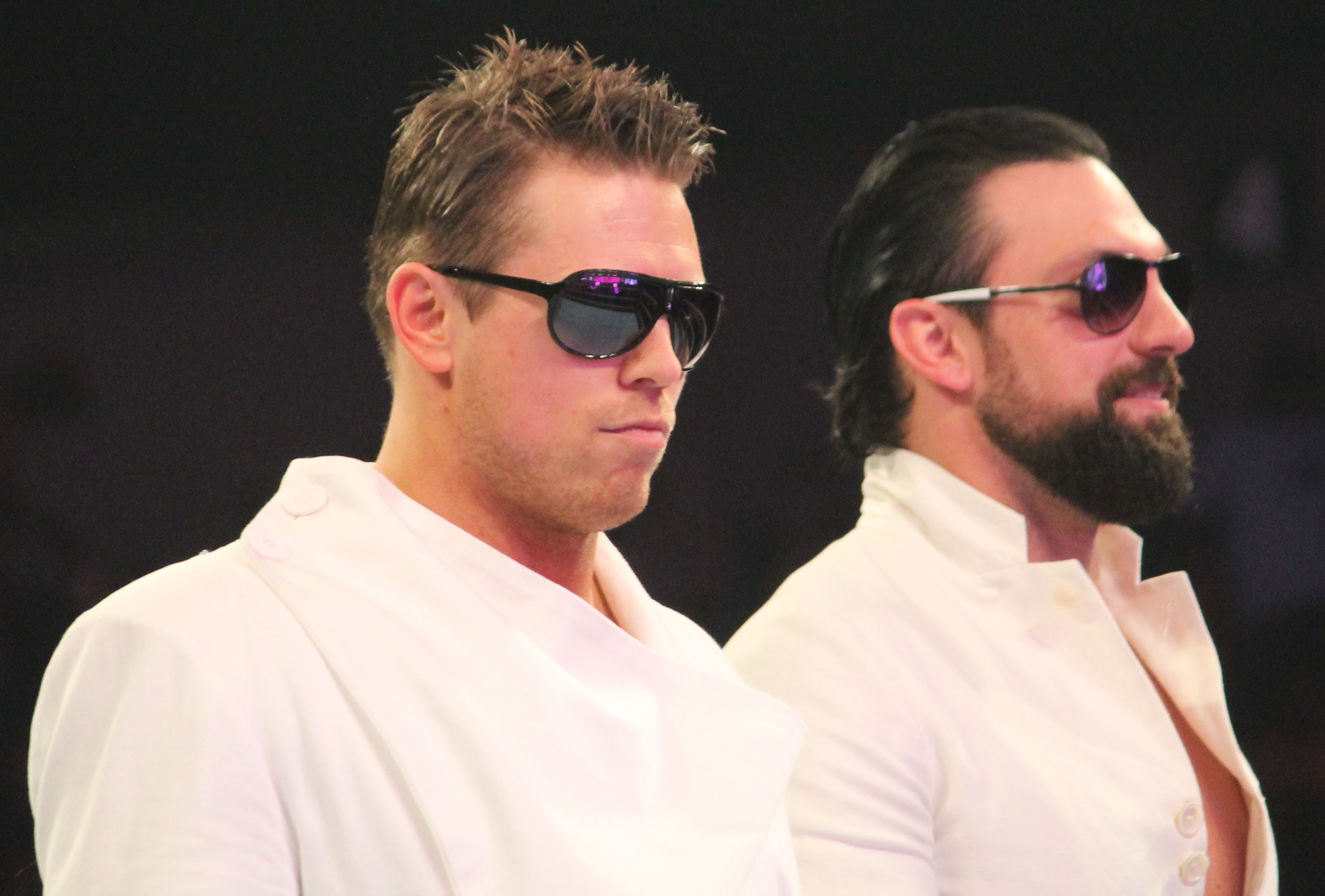
In June 2014, the Miz adopted a movie star persona, bringing in Damien Sandow as his "stunt double" (known as Damien Mizdow)

After a two-month hiatus filming The Marine 4: Moving Target, the Miz returned on the June 30 episode of Raw and immediately began to insult the crowd and taking on the gimmick of a movie star, turning heel in the process. At Battleground on July 20, the Miz won a battle royal by lastly eliminating Dolph Ziggler to win the Intercontinental Championship for the third time. At SummerSlam on August 17, Ziggler defeated the Miz to recapture the title. Later that month, Damien Sandow began appearing with the Miz as his "stunt double" (mimicking all of the Miz's moves and mannerisms) and was subsequently billed as Damien Mizdow. At Night of Champions on September 21, the Miz defeated Ziggler to regain the Intercontinental Championship, only to lose the title to Ziggler in a rematch the following night. After defeating Sheamus several times with the help of Mizdow, the Miz challenged him for the United States Championship at Hell in a Cell on October 26, but he was unsuccessful.

At Survivor Series on November 23, the Miz and Mizdow won the WWE Tag Team Championship by winning a fatal four-way match against defending champions Gold and Stardust, The Usos and Los Matadores. At TLC: Tables, Ladders & Chairs on December 14, the Miz and Mizdow lost by disqualification against The Usos after Miz hit Jimmy Uso with a Slammy Award, resulting in the pair retaining the titles. On the December 29 episode of Raw, the Miz and Mizdow lost the titles to The Usos. The Miz and Mizdow were unsuccessful in regaining the championships at the Royal Rumble on January 25, 2015. The Miz was the first entrant in the Royal Rumble match later that night but was eliminated by Bubba Ray Dudley, in just four minutes. After Mizdow began to get more attention from the audience, the Miz relegated Mizdow to his personal assistant out of spite. The Miz and Mizdow then competed in the André the Giant Memorial Battle Royal at WrestleMania 31 on March 29, which the Miz failed to win after being eliminated by Mizdow, dissolving their partnership. On the April 20 episode of Raw, the Miz defeated Mizdow in a match where the winner retained the Miz brand, with help from Summer Rae.

At SummerSlam on August 23, the Miz competed for the Intercontinental Championship in a triple threat match also involving Big Show and Ryback, but lost. At Survivor Series on November 22, The Miz competed in a traditional five-on-five elimination tag-team match alongside The Cosmic Wasteland (Stardust and The Ascension) and Bo Dallas in a losing effort against The Dudley Boyz, Goldust, Neville and Titus O'Neil. At Royal Rumble on January 24, 2016, the Miz competed in the 2016 Royal Rumble match, entering at number 25 and lasting nearly 9 minutes before being eliminated by Roman Reigns. On April 3, at WrestleMania 32, the Miz wrestled in a seven-man ladder match for the Intercontinental Championship, which was won by Zack Ryder.

==== Multiple championship reigns (2016–2018) ====
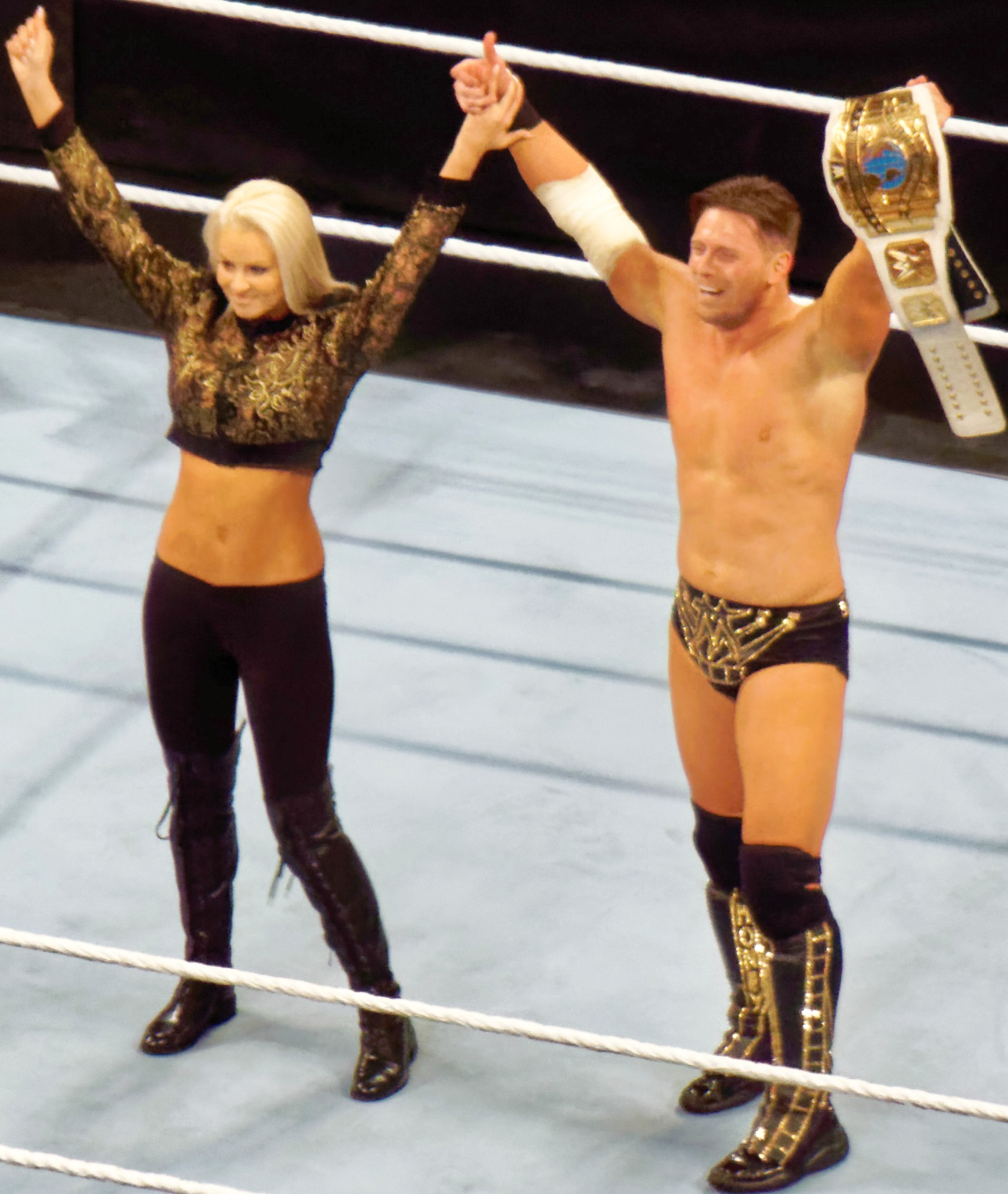
The Miz celebrating along his wife Maryse after winning his fifth Intercontinental Championship in April 2016

On the Raw episode post-WrestleMania 32, the Miz won the Intercontinental Championship for the fifth time, after his wife Maryse made her return to WWE and distracted Zack Ryder by slapping his father, thus becoming his manager in the process, where the two then became an on-screen power couple. In the weeks following, the Miz and Maryse then began to cut various promos during the Miz TV segments, while calling themselves the "it" couple. At Payback on May 1, the Miz defeated Cesaro to retain his championship after Cesaro was distracted by Kevin Owens and Sami Zayn brawling on the apron, leading to a feud over the Intercontinental Championship between the four men. At Extreme Rules on May 22, the Miz successfully retained the championship against Cesaro, Zayn and Owens in a highly acclaimed fatal four-way match, when Miz pinned Cesaro. The following night on Raw, the Miz failed to qualify for the 2016 Money in the Bank ladder match when he was defeated by Cesaro, setting up another championship match between the two set for the week's SmackDown, which the Miz won. Following this, he and Maryse began filming The Marine 5: Battleground, taking them out of action. Both returned on the June 27 episode of Raw, where he lost to Kane in a championship match via countout. At Battleground on July 24, the Intercontinental Championship match between the Miz and Darren Young ended in a double disqualification after the Miz pushed Bob Backlund (Darren Young's mentor) and Young attacked him. On July 19 at the 2016 WWE draft, the Miz, along with Maryse was drafted to the SmackDown brand, with the Intercontinental Championship becoming exclusive to that brand. At SummerSlam on August 21, the Miz successfully defended the championship against Apollo Crews.

As soon as she got hired, it gave me a whole new confidence in everything -- in my ability to do promos, in my ability to be in the ring..." [...] When your wife is sitting there watching you ringside, you are kind of showing off, and you don't want to look stupid -- ever. [...] I'm not in one of those relationships where I'm like, "Ugh, I'm with her all the time, and it sucks" [...] I'm like, "This is what I want." I want to be around her all the time because she's my best friend, and we talk about everything. It brings a whole new light to my life. To be away from her kind of puts you in a down mood.

— The Miz on ESPN about his relationship with Maryse

On the August 23 episode of Talking Smack, the Miz went on a critically acclaimed tirade against SmackDown General Manager Daniel Bryan for calling him a coward, with the Miz calling Bryan a "coward" for not returning to the ring when he promised the fans he would, before telling him to "go back to the bingo halls with your indie friends". The Miz then restarted his feud with Dolph Ziggler, successfully defending the Intercontinental Championship against him at Backlash on September 11, after Maryse sprayed an unknown substance at Ziggler while the referee was distracted. Afterwards, the Miz continued to blame Bryan and vowed not to defend his Intercontinental Championship on any show until he was granted a contract "renegotiation". At No Mercy on October 9, the Miz lost the Intercontinental Championship to Ziggler in a title vs career match after Maryse and The Spirit Squad (Kenny and Mikey), were ejected from ringside, ending the Miz's reign at 188 days. On the 900th episode of SmackDown Live on November 15, Maryse helped the Miz to win the championship for the sixth time. The Miz successfully defended the title against Raw's Sami Zayn at Survivor Series on November 20, after Maryse prematurely rang the bell, causing a distraction. The Miz faced Ziggler once more in a ladder match at TLC: Tables, Ladders & Chairs on December 4, which The Miz won to end their feud.

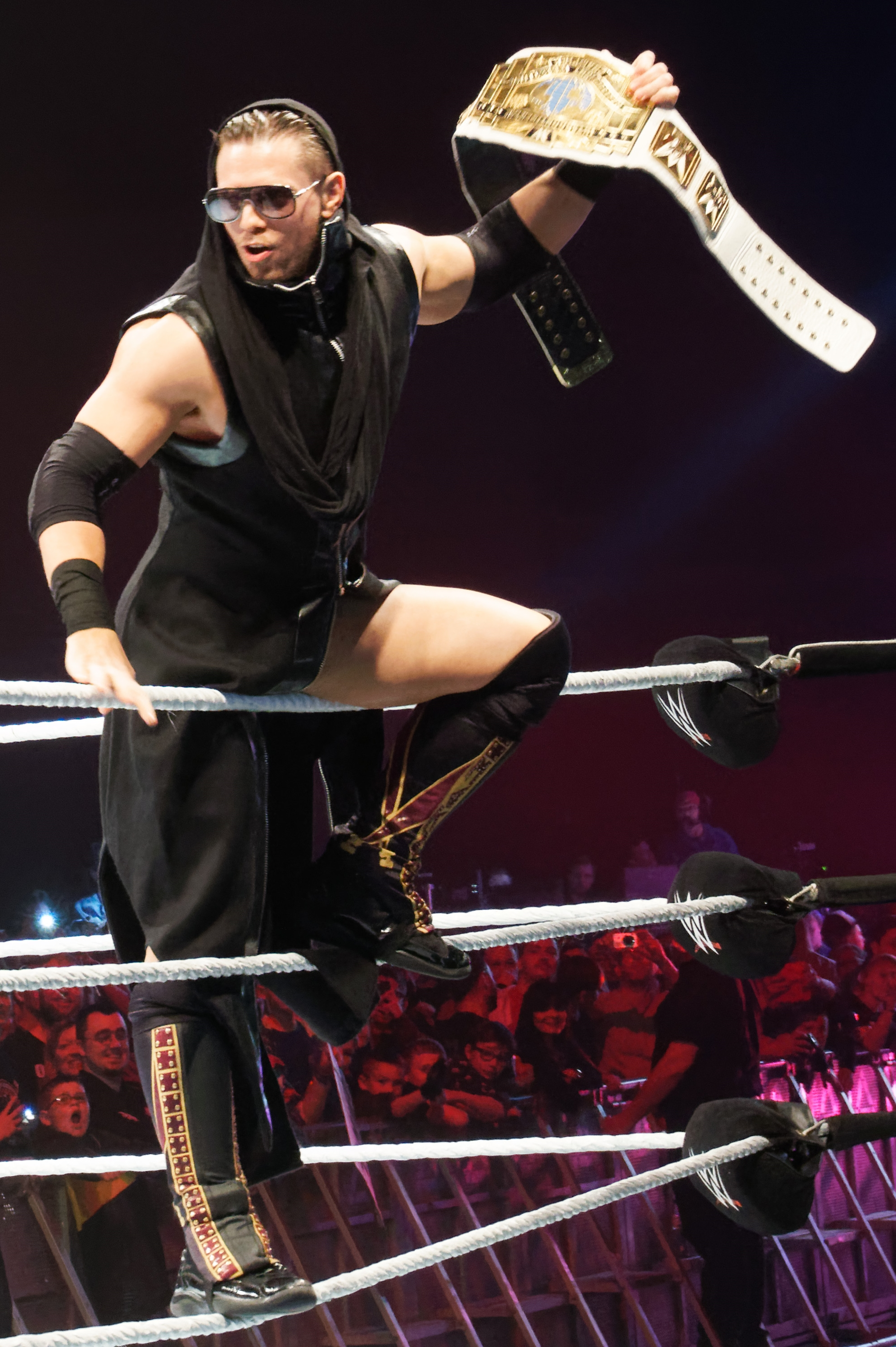
The Miz as Intercontinental Champion in April 2016

On the December 6 episode of SmackDown Live, the Miz successfully defended the title against Dean Ambrose after interference from Maryse and distraction from James Ellsworth. Two weeks later on SmackDown Live, the Miz successfully defended the championship against Apollo Crews. After the match, the Miz was interviewed by Renee Young, where the Miz sarcastically responded by revealing Young and Ambrose's real life relationship, prompting her to slap the Miz. On the January 3, 2017 episode of SmackDown Live, the Miz lost the Intercontinental Championship to Ambrose despite interference from Maryse. On January 29, the Miz entered the 2017 Royal Rumble match at number 15 and lasted 32 minutes until he was eliminated by the Undertaker.

On the January 31 episode of SmackDown Live, the Miz was revealed as one of the participants of the Elimination Chamber match for the WWE Championship which took place on February 12, where the Miz eliminated Dean Ambrose, but was eliminated by John Cena. On the February 21 episode of SmackDown Live, the Miz participated in a ten-man battle royal to determine the challenger for the Bray Wyatt's WWE Championship, but was eliminated by Cena. After he was eliminated, he returned to the match to eliminate Cena. On the February 28 episode of SmackDown Live, the Miz and Maryse made a special edition of Miz TV to critique Cena's powers on the backstage environment before Maryse slapped Cena and Nikki Bella—Cena's girlfriend—came to save him. On the March 14 episode of SmackDown Live, after a showdown between the Miz and Maryse against Cena and Nikki, SmackDown General Manager Daniel Bryan scheduled a mixed tag team match at WrestleMania 33 on April 2, which the Miz and Maryse lost.

On April 10, the Miz was drafted to the Raw brand along with Maryse as part of the Superstar Shake Up, where they made their debut on the same night dressed as Cena and Nikki, before being confronted by the Intercontinental Champion Dean Ambrose, who was also drafted to Raw in the Superstar Shake-up. At Extreme Rules on June 4, the Miz defeated Ambrose to win the Intercontinental Championship for the seventh time.

On the June 19 episode of Raw, the Miz allied himself with Bo Dallas and Curtis Axel, a team which was later dubbed "the Miztourage". The Miz successfully defended the Intercontinental Championship against Dean Ambrose at Great Balls of Fire on July 9, due to interference from the Miztourage. At the SummerSlam pre-show on August 20, the Miz and the Miztourage defeated Jason Jordan and The Hardy Boyz (Jeff Hardy and Matt Hardy) in a six-man tag-team match. In September, the Miz began a feud with Jordan after he was declared number one contender to the Miz's championship. At No Mercy on September 25, the Miz successfully retained the championship against Jordan.

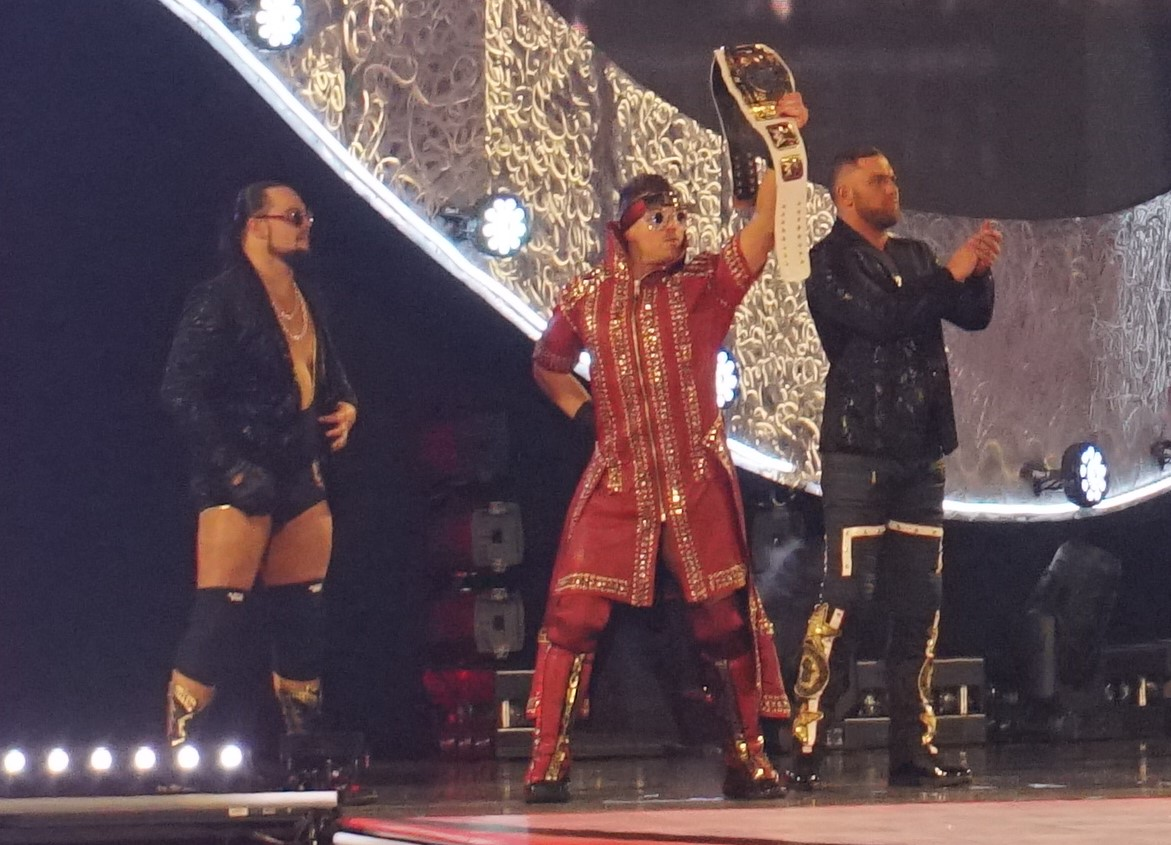
Miz (center) with The Miztourage (Bo Dallas (left) and Curtis Axel (right)) as Intercontinental Champion at WrestleMania 34

The following month, he allied himself with the Bar (Cesaro and Sheamus) in order to take on the reformed Shield faction (Ambrose, Seth Rollins and Roman Reigns). The Miz teamed with Cesaro, Sheamus, Kane and Braun Strowman against Ambrose, Rollins and Kurt Angle (who replaced Reigns after he was not medically cleared to compete) in a 5-on-3 handicap Tables, Ladders and Chairs match at TLC: Tables, Ladders & Chairs on October 22 in a losing effort. On November 19, the Miz faced SmackDown's United States Champion Baron Corbin at Survivor Series in an interbrand champion vs. champion match, which he lost. The following night on Raw, the Miz lost the Intercontinental Championship to Roman Reigns, ending his title reign at 169 days.

After taking a hiatus, the Miz returned in January 2018, and won the Intercontinental Championship back from Roman Reigns during the 25th Anniversary of Raw, beginning his eighth reign with the championship. The Miz then participated in the 2018 Royal Rumble match on January 28, but he failed to win the match after being eliminated by the combined effort of Reigns and Seth Rollins. At the Elimination Chamber event on February 25, the Miz competed in an Elimination Chamber match to determine the number one contender for Brock Lesnar's Universal Championship, but he was the first participant eliminated, by Braun Strowman. Also around this time, the Miz took part in the Mixed Match Challenge tournament, with Asuka as his partner. They defeated the teams of Big E and Carmella, Finn Bálor and Sasha Banks and Braun Strowman and Alexa Bliss, before defeating Bobby Roode and Charlotte Flair in the finals to win the tournament and earn $100,000 for the charity of their choice. At WrestleMania 34 on April 8, the Miz lost the Intercontinental Championship to Seth Rollins in a triple threat match also involving Finn Bálor, suffering his first pinfall loss at WrestleMania.

==== Feuds with Daniel Bryan and Shane McMahon (2018–2020) ====
On April 16, during the Superstar Shake-up, the Miz was traded to the SmackDown brand and was separated from the Miztourage. Throughout July and August, the Miz taunted and goaded long-time rival Daniel Bryan, facing him at SummerSlam where the Miz won. They wrestled again in a mixed tag team match also involving Maryse and Brie Bella at Hell in a Cell, where Miz won again. In their third match, Bryan defeated Miz at Super Show-Down.

At Crown Jewel, after advancing to the final round of the WWE World Cup tournament, Miz was ruled unable to compete. Shane McMahon replaced Miz to win the World Cup. Miz and McMahon began a tag team, turning Miz into a face for the first time since 2014. They won the WWE SmackDown Tag Team Championship at the 2019 Royal Rumble when they defeated The Bar (Cesaro and Sheamus) but lost it 21 days later at Elimination Chamber to The Usos. The duo failed to regain the titles from the Usos at Fastlane on March 10. After the loss, McMahon turned on the Miz by attacking both him and his father at ringside, turning McMahon into a villain. They wrestled in a falls count anywhere match at WrestleMania 35 and a steel cage match at Money in the Bank, but Miz lost both times.

On April 15, the Miz was drafted to Raw as part of the 2019 WWE Superstar Shake-up and restarted his feud with Dolph Ziggler after a confrontation on Miz TV. A match between the two was arranged for SummerSlam, however during the contract signing on the August 5 episode of Raw, the Miz revealed that he was not Ziggler's opponent, instead it was the returning Goldberg who took the Miz's place in the match. He stated in an interview: “I'll have many other opportunities at SummerSlam, but this might be Goldberg's last.” On the Raw after SummerSlam, the Miz defeated Ziggler to end their feud. The Miz then competed in the 2019 King of the Ring, but was eliminated in the first round by Baron Corbin. The Miz then unsuccessfully challenged for Shinsuke Nakamura's Intercontinental Championship at Clash of Champions on September 15, after interference from Nakamura's manager Sami Zayn.

As part of the 2019 draft, the Miz was drafted to the SmackDown brand. During the November 1 episode of SmackDown, NXT wrestler Tommaso Ciampa disrupted an edition of Miz TV to air his grievances towards the Miz, accusing him of being self-centered. He subsequently challenged Ciampa to a match, which he lost via pinfall. The following month, the Miz began a feud with Universal Champion Bray Wyatt, who, under his sinister alter ego "The Fiend", proclaimed he wanted to become part of The Miz's family. He later attacked the Miz backstage. Subsequently, a non-title match between the Miz and Wyatt was arranged for the TLC pay-per-view on December 15, which The Miz lost.

==== Reunion with John Morrison (2020–2021) ====
On the January 3, 2020 episode of SmackDown, The Miz blindsided Kofi Kingston after being defeated in a match against him and subsequently lashed out at the audience after being booed, turning heel for the first time since 2018. Later that night, he reunited with his former tag team partner John Morrison, who made his return to WWE. The Miz participated in the 2020 Royal Rumble match but was eliminated by the eventual winner Drew McIntyre in 30 seconds. After winning a title shot on the January 31, episode of SmackDown, The Miz and Morrison won the SmackDown Tag Team Championship from The New Day at Super ShowDown. At Elimination Chamber on March 8, the Miz and Morrison retained the championship over The New Day, The Usos, Heavy Machinery (Otis and Tucker), Lucha House Party (Gran Metalik and Lince Dorado) and Dolph Ziggler and Robert Roode in a tag team Elimination Chamber match. The Miz and Morrison were originally set to defend the championship in a triple threat tag team ladder match against The New Day and The Usos at WrestleMania 36, but the Miz pulled out of the event due to concerns arising from the COVID-19 pandemic. Instead, Morrison individually defended the championship in a triple threat ladder match against Kofi Kingston of The New Day and Jimmy Uso of The Usos, which Morrison won. On the April 17 episode of SmackDown, the duo lost the titles back to The New Day after the Miz unsuccessfully defended the titles by himself in a triple threat match against Big E and Jey Uso ending their reign at 50 days. At Money in the Bank on May 10, the Miz and Morrison unsuccessfully attempted to regain the championship in a fatal four-way tag team match also involving Lucha House Party (Gran Metalik and Lince Dorado) and The Forgotten Sons (Steve Cutler and Wesley Blake). Next, the Miz and Morrison started a rivalry with Universal Champion Braun Strowman. At Backlash on June 14, the duo competed for Strowman's title in a two-on-one handicap match, but lost.

The Miz and Morrison then began feuding with Otis and Tucker in pursuit of Otis' Money in the Bank contract. During the 2020 WWE Draft in October, the Miz and Morrison were drafted to the Raw brand. At Hell in a Cell on October 25, the Miz defeated Otis to win the Money in the Bank contract, becoming the second person not to do so in the Money in the Bank ladder match, and the third person to hold the contract more than once. The Miz cashed in his Money in the Bank contract on December 20 at the TLC: Tables, Ladders & Chairs event during a TLC match between AJ Styles and the WWE Champion Drew McIntyre, making the match a triple threat in the process, but was unsuccessful as McIntyre retained his title. However, on the December 28 episode of Raw, the Miz had the contract returned to him as the cash-in at TLC was ruled invalid due to Morrison cashing in the contract on his behalf (as only the contract holder himself can cash it in). The Miz entered the Royal Rumble match on January 31, 2021, but he was quickly eliminated by the debuting Damian Priest. At Elimination Chamber on February 21, the Miz successfully cashed his Money in the Bank contract on WWE Champion Drew McIntyre, after McIntyre was assaulted by Bobby Lashley, starting his second reign with the WWE Championship which made him the first ever two-time WWE Grand Slam champion. The Miz went on to lose the championship to Lashley on the March 1 episode of Raw, ending his reign at only eight days.

After this, the Miz and Morrison feuded with Damian Priest and rapper Bad Bunny. On the first night of WrestleMania 37 on April 10, the Miz and Morrison were defeated by Bad Bunny and Priest. At WrestleMania Backlash on May 16, the Miz lost to Priest. After the match, the Miz was seemingly "eaten" by zombies as a way to cross-promote Army of the Dead. During the match, the Miz suffered the first legitimate injury in his WWE career after tearing his ACL, taking him out of action indefinitely. Despite his injury, the Miz continued appearing television in a wheelchair accompanying Morrison in his matches. The Miz returned from injury on the August 16 episode of Raw, losing to Damian Priest. The next week on Raw, the Miz attacked Morrison, ending their partnership. Afterwards, the Miz took time off to compete on the thirtieth season of Dancing with the Stars.

==== Various feuds and alliances (2022–present) ====
The Miz feuded with Edge, being defeated by him at Day 1, in a singles match and at Royal Rumble in a mixed tag team match including Maryse and Beth Phoenix. On the first night of WrestleMania 38 on April 2, the Miz and Logan Paul defeated The Mysterios (composed of Rey and Dominik Mysterio). After the match, the Miz performed his finishing maneuver, the Skull Crushing Finale, on Logan Paul, subsequently turning on him. This led to a match between the two at SummerSlam, which Paul won. In 2023, the Miz was the host of WrestleMania 39. At the event, the Miz lost impromptu matches against Pat McAfee and Snoop Dogg, the latter replacing a legitimately injured Shane McMahon early in the bout. At SummerSlam, the Miz entered into Slim Jim SummerSlam Battle Royal, but was eliminated by LA Knight. The Miz then entered into a brief feud with LA Knight, leading to a match at Payback with John Cena serving as special guest referee, which the Miz lost. On the September 15 episode of SmackDown, the Miz was defeated by Knight once again to end their feud.

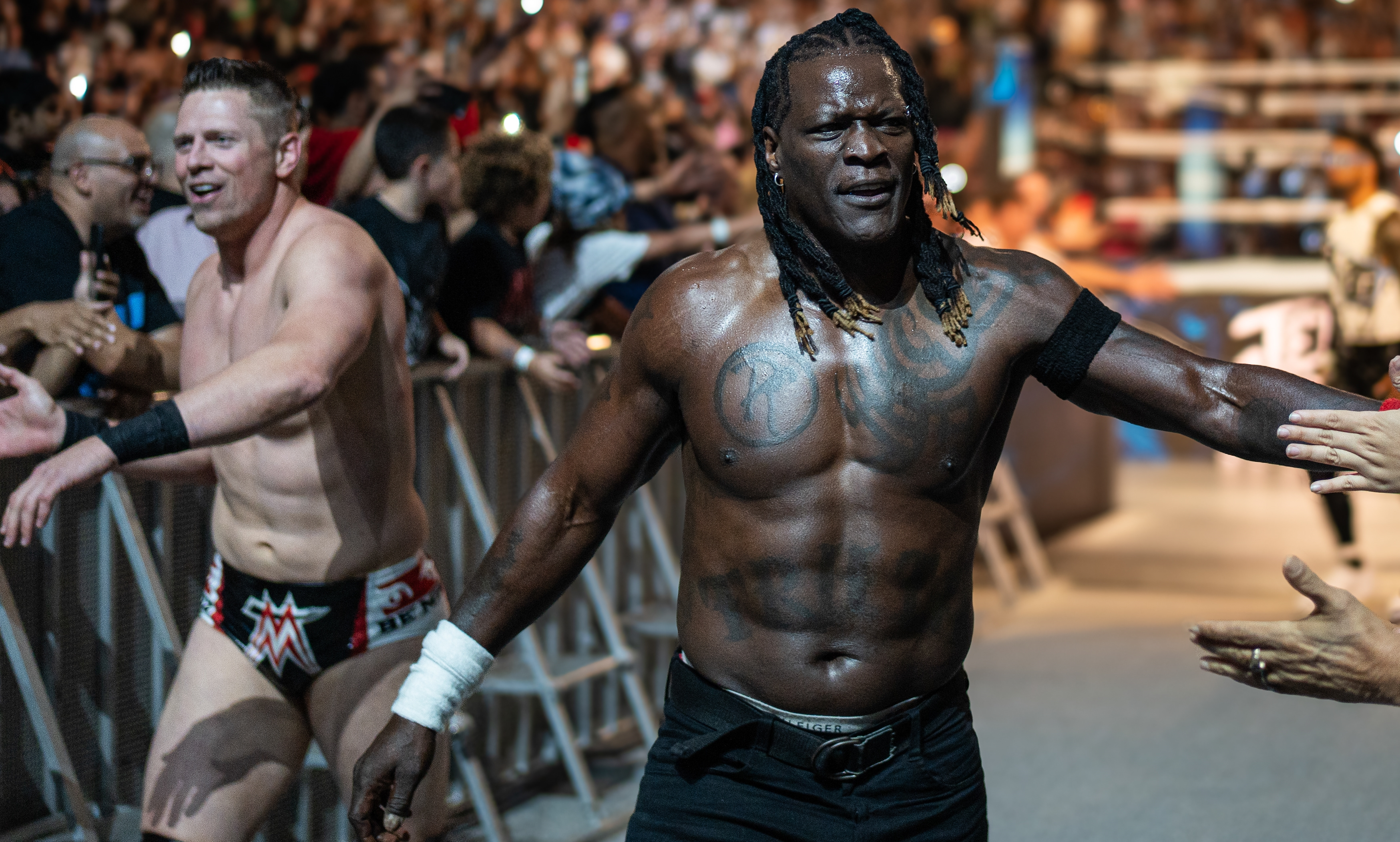
Awesome Truth reunited in 2024

On the October 30 episode of Raw, the Miz confronted Intercontinental Champion Gunther on Miz TV before being attacked by his stablemates, turning face for the first time since January 2020. The following week, the Miz won a fatal four-way match to earn a title match against Gunther at Survivor Series: WarGames. At Survivor Series: WarGames on November 25, the Miz failed to win the title from Gunther. The Miz challenged Gunther for the title again on the December 18 episode of Raw in a losing effort and, per the stipulation, could not challenge for the title again as long as Gunther remained champion.

In 2024, the Miz reunited with former tag team partner R-Truth, winning the Raw Tag Team Championship at WrestleMania XL. On the April 15 edition of Raw, the Raw Tag Team Championship was renamed to the World Tag Team Championship and the team were presented new championship belts by chief content officer Triple H and Raw General Manager Adam Pearce. They hold the titles until June 24 episode of Raw, when they lost it to Bálor and McDonagh. On the July 29 episode of Raw, Miz was announced as the official host of SummerSlam in his hometown of Cleveland, Ohio. On the September 30 episode of Raw, Miz kicked R-Truth and walked out on him causing the team to lose against The Authors of Pain, turning heel once again in the process. This followed several weeks of Karrion Kross subtlety manipulating the Miz to turn against his tag team partner. Two weeks later, on the October 14 episode of Raw, Miz was defeated by R-Truth in a match, which was followed by the winner being beaten down by the Final Testament, after which Miz performed the Skull-Crushing Finale on R-Truth.

On the January 24, 2025 episode of SmackDown, it was announced that Miz had been transferred to the SmackDown brand. On the February 21 episode of SmackDown, Miz formed a partnership with Carmelo Hayes as Melo Don't Miz, where they defeated R-Truth and LA Knight in their first match together. On the September 26 episode of SmackDown, during a tag team match against The Street Profits (Angelo Dawkins and Montez Ford), after Miz tried to take the glory and tag himself in, Hayes cut him off, causing them to lose the match. The following week on SmackDown, Miz attacked Hayes as Hayes was about to accept United States Champion Sami Zayn's open challenge for the title, disbanding Melo Don't Miz. At the Royal Rumble on January 31, 2026, Miz entered the match at #23 being eliminated by eventual winner Roman Reigns.

== Professional wrestling style and persona ==
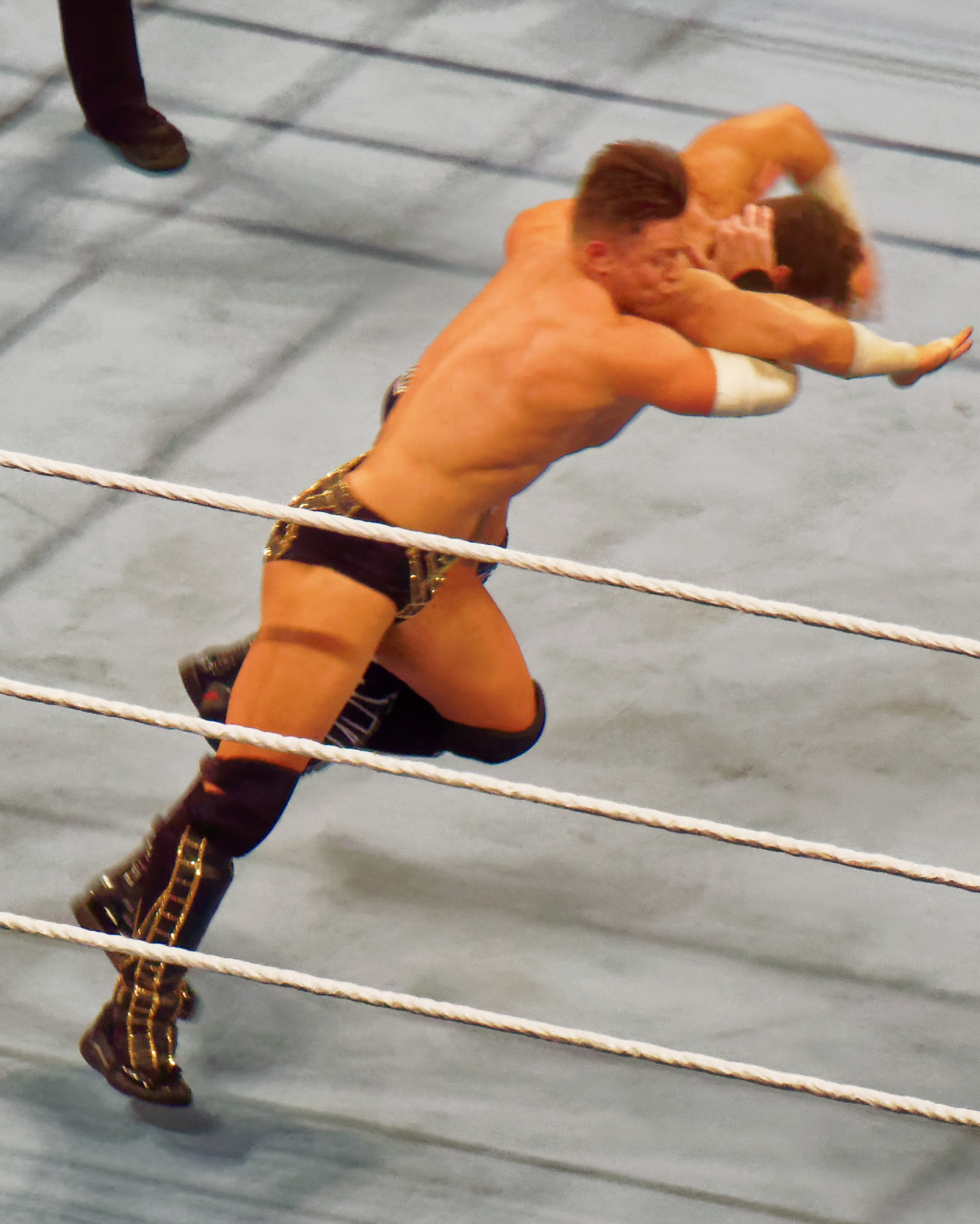
Miz performing the Skull Crushing Finale on Zack Ryder in April 2016

The Miz's finisher, per the reality television and Hollywood tie-ins to his character, is a full nelson facebuster dubbed the Skull Crushing Finale. He originally performed a swinging inverted DDT dubbed Mizard of Oz that he developed into a running knee lift followed by a neckbreaker slam, named the Reality Check, before abandoning them both and adopting his new finisher in mid-2009.

Having been associated with Ric Flair, the Miz occasionally performs Flair's submission hold, the figure-four leg lock. Since his storyline with Daniel Bryan, the Miz incorporated several of Bryan's moves, like the Yes! Kicks, which he nicknames the It Kicks.

Criticism has been focused on the booking of the Miz's character. When he became a heroic character in late-2012, his turn was not well received by critics, who commented that Miz as a fan favorite was too similar to his villainous character because he was "still cocky, arrogant, and egotistical" while "pivoted toward calling out established heels" (villains). Other criticisms were that Miz was "juvenile", lacking of depth, "grating and not endearing to the audience" and that "there was not that moment when he officially turned and aligned his values with the audience's". After the Miz won the WWE Championship for the second time in February 2021, Zack Heydorn for Pro Wrestling Torch questioned the decision to give him the championship, writing that he had not been presented as "a credible professional wrestler in the ring", and complained his recent booking had not made him believable contender for a world championship. He then concluded by saying that he "should be far away from the WWE Championship picture." Ryan Byers of 411Mania considered Miz to be a poor world champion, stating that he was "booked ridiculously weakly". Despite this disapproval towards his character, Miz has received praise for his promos and speaking ability. Rhea Ripley cites watching The Miz as an inspiration growing up.

== Other media ==
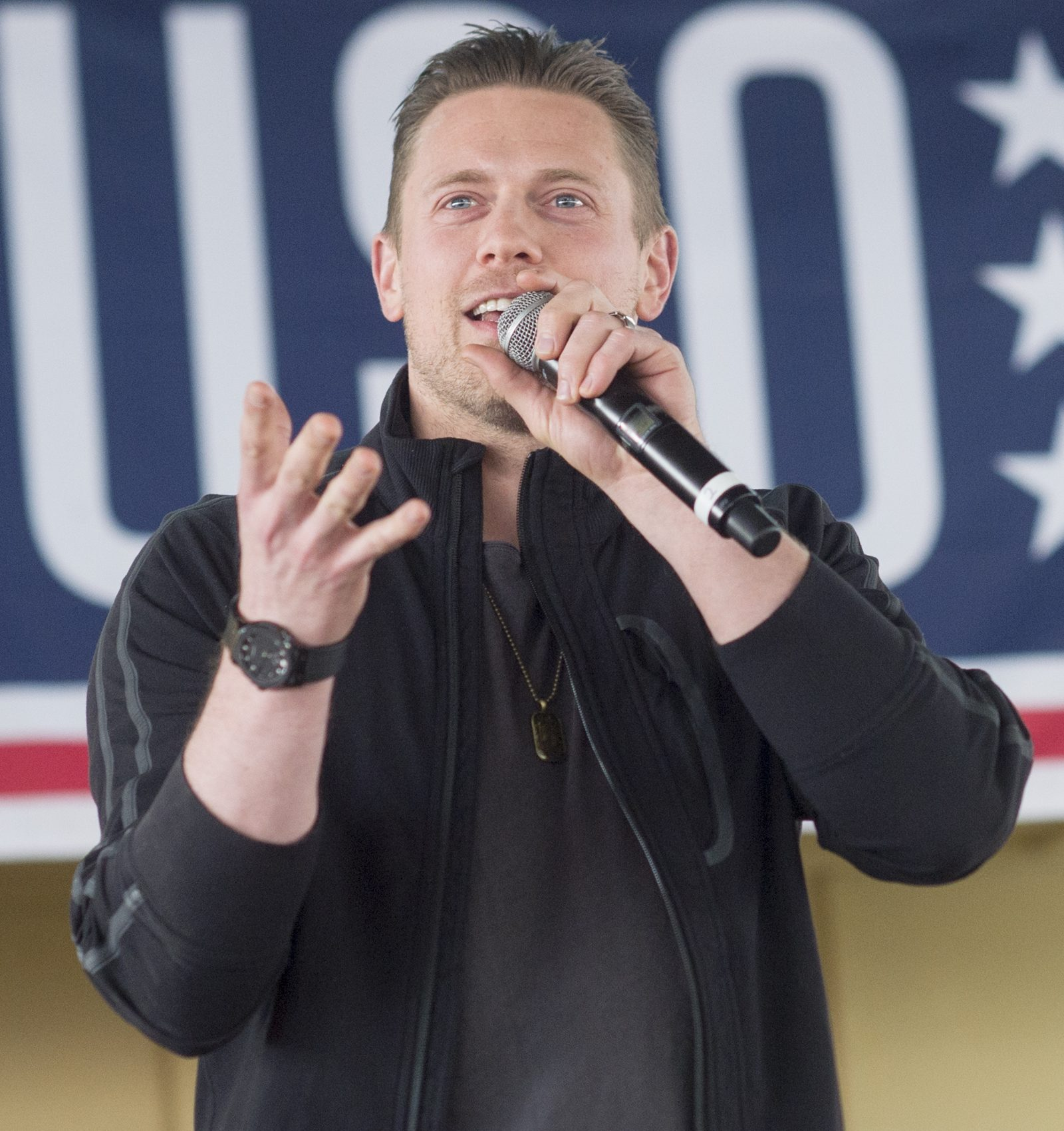
Mizanin speaking at a United Service Organizations event in 2017

In 2008, the Miz made his first WWE video game appearance in WWE SmackDown vs. Raw 2009 and appears in every WWE video game since, with his latest appearance being WWE 2K26. In 2012, the Miz also appeared in the WWE Studios and Kare Prod project Les reines du ring (Queens of the Ring), alongside Eve Torres and CM Punk, and on MDA Show of Strength with Maryse and other celebrities. In March 2013, he attended the Kids Choice Awards with Maryse and The Rock.

Mizanin played a small role in the film The Campaign in 2012. In 2013, the Miz starred in WWE Studios film The Marine 3: Homefront, replacing fellow wrestler Randy Orton, who was dropped from the role due to his bad conduct discharge from the Marine Corps. He reprised his role as Jake Carter to star in the follow up films The Marine 4: Moving Target (2015), The Marine 5: Battleground (2017) and The Marine 6: Close Quarters (2018).

Mizanin starred in the ABC Family television film Christmas Bounty, which premiered in December 2013. In 2015, he starred in the WWE Studios Christmas film Santa's Little Helper.

In 2016, Mizanin guest-starred in Supernatural as a wrestler named Shawn Harley in an organization targeted by a demon. In 2018, Mizanin and his wife Maryse starred in a USA Network reality television series titled Miz & Mrs. The show ran for 3 seasons from 2018–2022. In 2020, he starred on a second show on USA, serving as host of the game show Cannonball. On July 14, 2024, Mizanin was the subject in an episode of Biography: WWE Legends.

In March 2026, it was announced Mizanin would host the reboot of the competition series American Gladiators, which premiered in April 2026.

== Personal life ==
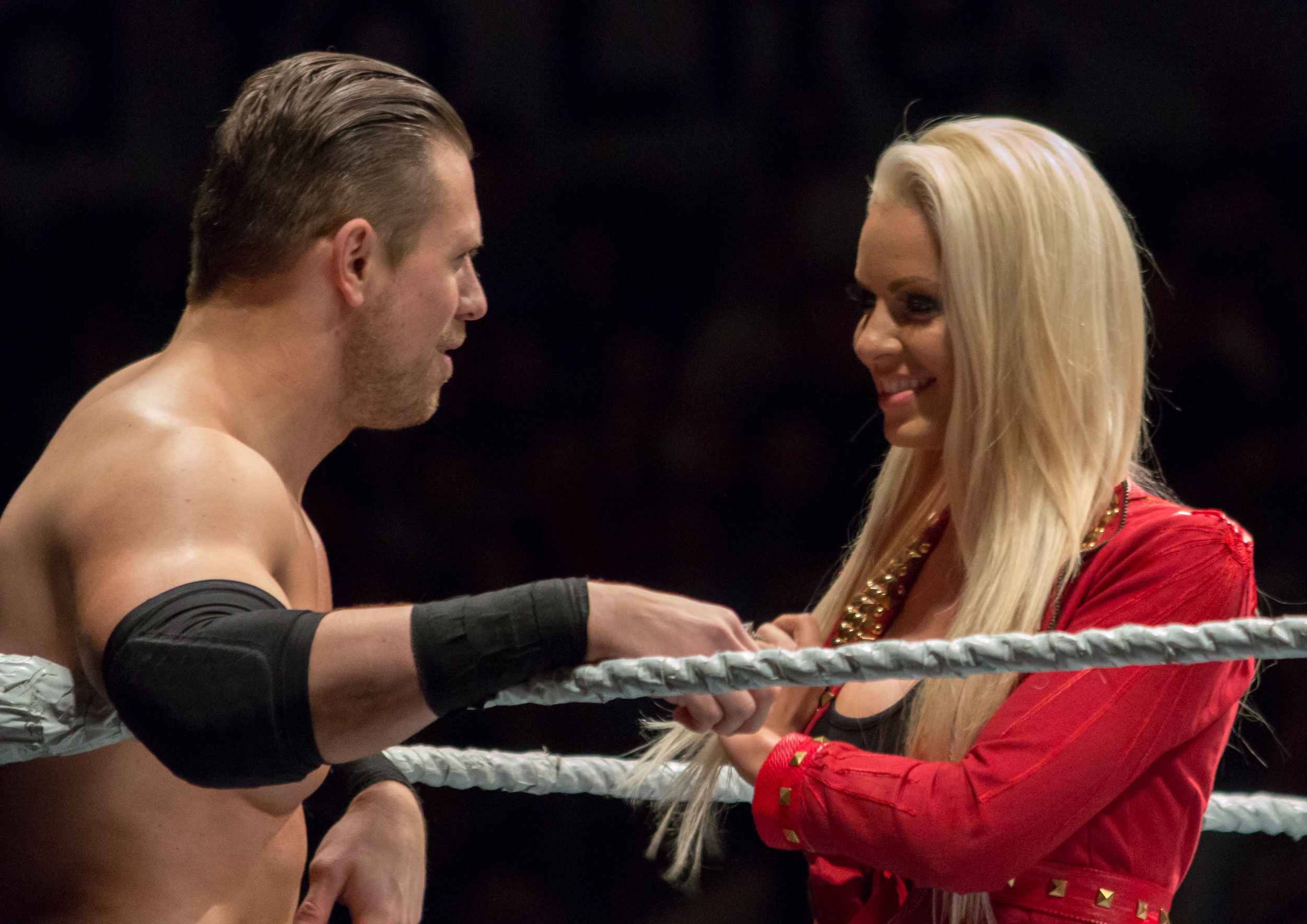
Mizanin and his wife Maryse Ouellet in July 2016

Mizanin married his longtime girlfriend, Canadian fellow WWE wrestler Maryse Ouellet, in The Bahamas on February 20, 2014. Their first daughter, Monroe Sky Mizanin, was born on March 27, 2018. Shortly thereafter, the family moved to Austin, Texas. During WWE's Elimination Chamber event in February 2019, the couple announced that they were expecting their second child in September. In August 2019, they moved permanently to Thousand Oaks, California. Their second daughter, Madison Jade Mizanin, was born on September 20, 2019.

An avid golfer Mizanin has competed in multiple celebrity golf tournaments, including the 2025 American Century Championship. He is a supporter of the Cleveland Browns.

== Filmography ==
=== Film ===
Year	Title	Role	Notes	Ref(s)
2012	The Campaign	Himself	Cameo	
2013	The Marine 3: Homefront	Jake Carter	Direct-to-video	
2013	Queens of the Ring	Himself	Cameo	
2013	Christmas Bounty	Mike "Mikey Muscles"	Television film	
2014	Scooby-Doo! WrestleMania Mystery	Himself	Voice, direct-to-video	
2015	The Marine 4: Moving Target	Jake Carter	Direct-to-video	
2015	Santa's Little Helper	Dax	Direct-to-video	
2016	Scooby-Doo! and WWE: Curse of the Speed Demon	Himself	Voice, direct-to-video	
2017	The Marine 5: Battleground	Jake Carter	Direct-to-video	
2018	The Marine 6: Close Quarters	Jake Carter	Direct-to-video	
2019	Fighting with My Family	Himself	Cameo	
2020	The Main Event	Himself	Cameo	

=== Television ===
Year	Title	Role	Notes	Ref(s)
2001	The Real World: Back to New York	Himself		
2002–05; 2012; 2017–19	The Challenge	Himself	As participant: Battle of the Seasons (2002, winner); The Gauntlet (2003–04); The Inferno (2004); Battle of the Sexes 2 (2004–05); The Inferno II (2005, winner); As host: Battle of the Exes (2012, reunion show); Invasion of the Champions (2017, reunion show); XXX: Dirty 30 (2017, reunion show); Champs vs. Stars (2017–18); Vendettas (2018, reunion show); War of the Worlds (2019, reunion show)	
2004; 2011; 2015	WWE Tough Enough	Himself	2004: participant 2011: coach 2015: talk host (ep. 1–5), judge (ep. 6–10)	
2005	Battle of the Network Reality Stars	Himself	Winner	
2006	Fear Factor	Himself	Winner	
2007	Identity	Himself	Episode 11	
2008	Ghost Hunters	Himself		
2009	Are You Smarter than a 5th Grader?	Himself		
2009	Dinner: Impossible	Himself		
2010	Destroy Build Destroy	Himself		
2011	H8R	Himself	Episode 4	
2012	Psych	Mario	Episode 91 ("Shawn and the Real Girl")	
2012	Pair of Kings	Damone	Episode 56 ("I'm Gonna Git You, Sponge Sucka")	
2014	Deal With It	Himself	Episode 18	
2014	Oh My English!	Himself	Season 3, episode 22	
2014	Family Game Night	Himself	Guest celebrity	
2015	Sirens	Lance	Episode 9 ("Transcendual")	
2016-2018	Ride Along	Himself	3 episodes	
2016	Supernatural	Shawn Harley	Episode 233 ("Beyond the Mat")	
2016	Celebs React	Himself	1 episode	
2016	Hell's Kitchen	Himself	Uncredited guest diner; Episode: "Let the Catfights Begin"	
2016–2019	Total Divas	Himself	Recurring (seasons 6–7); Guest (seasons 8–9): 21 episodes	
2016–2019	WWE Playback	Himself		
2018	Total Bellas	Himself	Episode: "What Comes Up, Must Go Down"	
2018–2022	Miz & Mrs.	Himself		
2020	Cannonball	Himself	Host	
2020	WWE Story Time	Himself		
2020	WWE Superstar Gaming Series	Himself	Contestant	
2021	Dancing with the Stars	Himself	Contestant	
2021	Side Hustle	Clint Kickwood	Episode: "Room for Munchy"	
2022	Trainwreck: Woodstock '99	Himself	Uncredited; archival footage	
2022	The Challenge: Untold History	Himself	Documentary series	
2022	WWE Evil	Himself	Documentary series	
2022	Celebrity Family Feud	Himself	Contestant	
2023	That Is My Jam	Himself	Episode: "Mike "The Miz" & Alexa Bliss vs. Diallo Riddle & Bashir Salahuddin"	
2023	Hamster & Gretel	Steve	Episode: "The Litigator vs. The Luchador"	
2024	Biography: WWE Legends	Himself	Episode: "The Miz"	
2026	Baki-Dou	Sam Atlas	English dub; Episode: "The Unstoppable Yawn"	
2026	American Gladiators	Himself	Host	

=== Video games ===
Year	Title	Role	Notes
2008	WWE SmackDown vs. Raw 2009	Himself	Playable character; video game debut
2009	WWE Legends of WrestleMania	Himself	Playable character
2009	WWE SmackDown vs. Raw 2010	Himself	Playable character
2010	WWE SmackDown vs. Raw 2011	Himself	Playable character; cover athlete
2011	WWE All Stars	Himself	Playable character
2011	WWE '12	Himself	Playable character
2012	WWE WrestleFest	Himself	Playable character
2012	WWE '13	Himself	Playable character
2013	WWE 2K14	Himself	Playable character
2014	WWE SuperCard	Himself	Playable character
2014	WWE 2K15	Himself	Playable character
2015	WWE Immortals	Himself	Playable character
2015	WWE 2K16	Himself	Playable character
2016	WWE 2K17	Himself	Playable character
2017	WWE 2K18	Himself	Playable character
2018	WWE 2K19	Himself	Playable character
2019	WWE 2K20	Himself	Playable character
2020	WWE 2K Battlegrounds	Himself	Playable character
2022	WWE 2K22	Himself	Playable character
2023	WWE 2K23	Himself	Playable character
2024	WWE 2K24	Himself	Playable character
2025	WWE 2K25	Himself	Playable character
2026	WWE 2K26	Himself	Playable character

== Honors ==
On July 3, 2019, Mizanin‘s hometown of Parma, Ohio declared "Mike The Miz Day" a formal ceremony in his honor was held at his alma mater Normandy High School.

== Championships and accomplishments ==
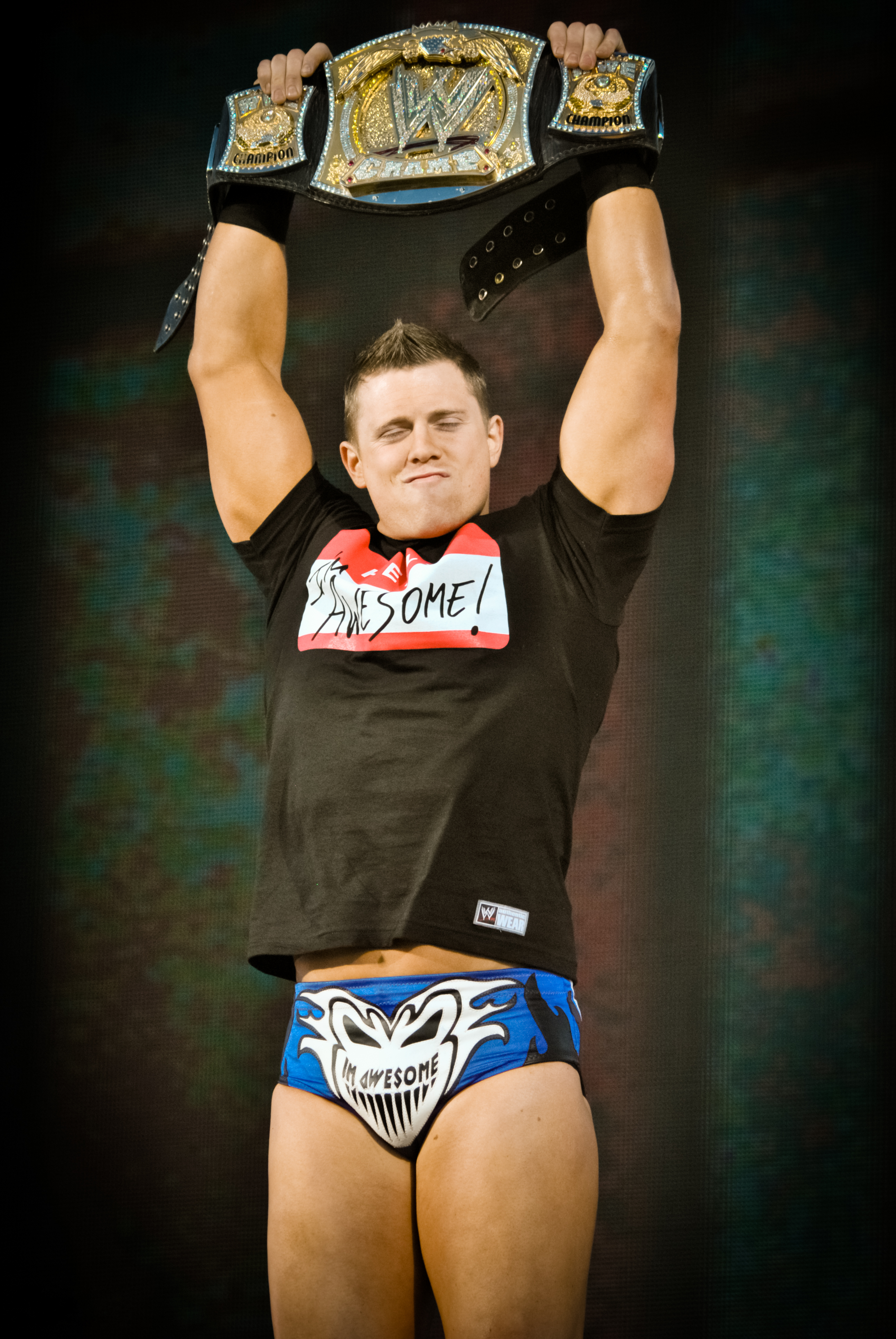
The Miz is a two-time WWE Champion...

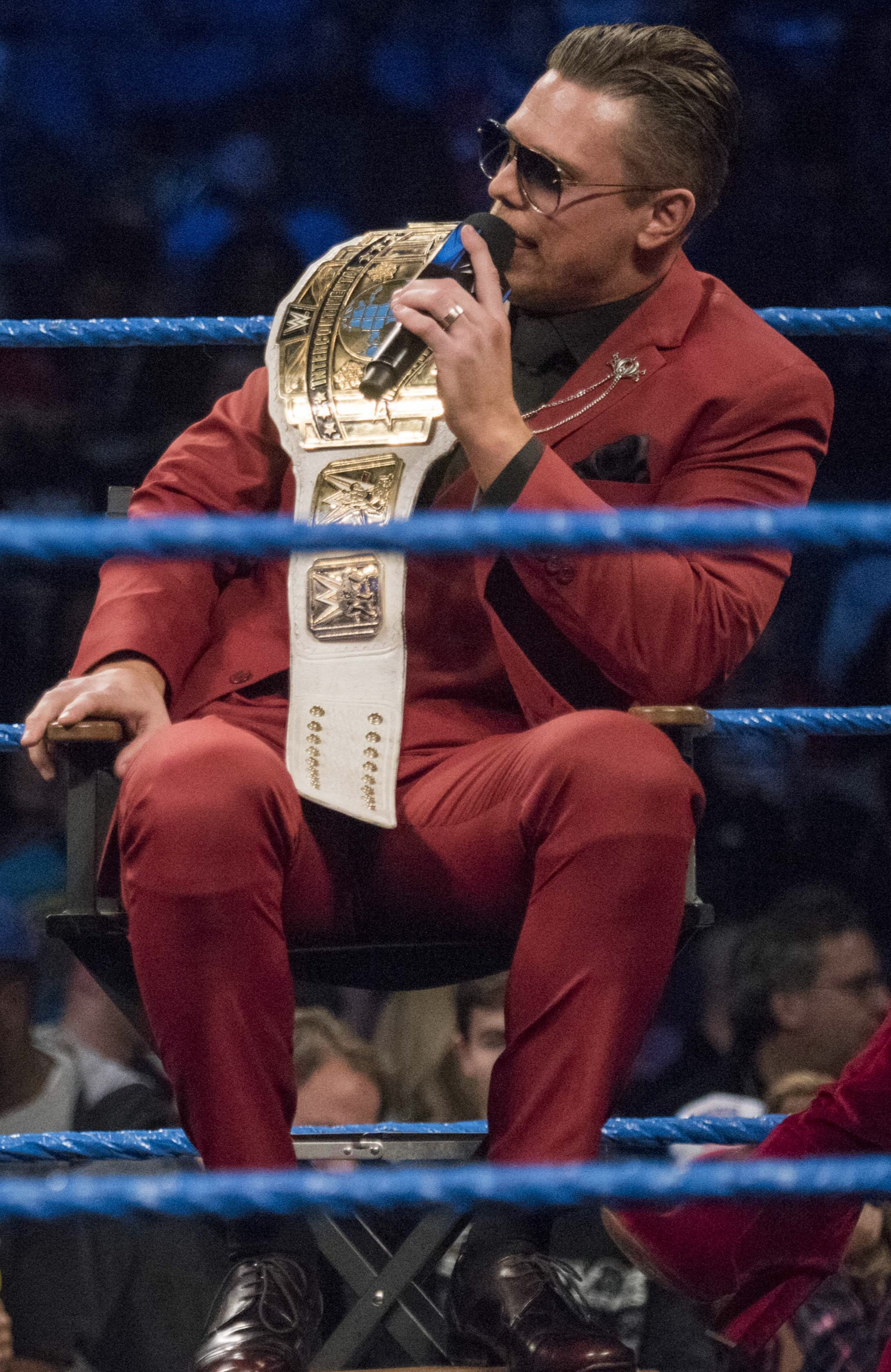
...an eight-time Intercontinental Champion...

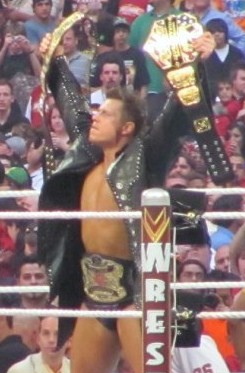
...a two-time United States Champion, and an overall nine-time tag team champion. At one point he held the U.S. Title concurrently with the World Tag Team Championship (which he has held twice) and is a five-time WWE (Raw, later World) Tag Team Champion

- The Baltimore Sun
  - Most Improved Wrestler of the Year (2009)
  - Tag Team of the Year (2008) – with John Morrison
- Cleveland Magazine
  - Most interesting people of 2022
- Deep South Wrestling
  - DSW Heavyweight Championship (1 time)
- Ohio Valley Wrestling
  - OVW Southern Tag Team Championship (1 time) – with Chris Cage
- Pro Wrestling Illustrated
  - Most Hated Wrestler of the Year (2011)
  - Most Improved Wrestler of the Year (2016)
  - Ranked No. 1 of the top 500 singles wrestlers in the PWI 500 in 2011
- Rolling Stone
  - Ranked No. 8 of the 10 best WWE wrestlers of 2016
  - WWE Wrestler of the Year (2017)
- World Wrestling Entertainment/WWE
  - WWE Championship (2 times)
  - WWE Intercontinental Championship (8 times)
  - WWE United States Championship (2 times)
  - World/WWE (Raw) Tag Team Championship (5 times) – with John Morrison (1), Big Show (1), John Cena (1), Damien Mizdow (1), and R-Truth (1)
  - WWE SmackDown Tag Team Championship (2 times) – with Shane McMahon (1) and John Morrison (1)
  - World Tag Team Championship (1971–2010) (2 times) – with John Morrison (1) and Big Show (1)
  - Mixed Match Challenge (Season 1) – with Asuka
  - Mr Money in the Bank (2 times) (Raw 2010) (Men's 2020)
  - 25th Triple Crown Champion
  - Fifth Grand Slam Champion (under the existing format, 14th overall)
  - First two-time Grand Slam Champion
  - Slammy Award (2 times)
    - Best WWE.com Exclusive (2008) The Dirt-Sheet – with John Morrison
    - Tag Team of the Year (2008) – with John Morrison
- Wrestling Observer Newsletter
  - Most Improved (2008, 2009)
  - Tag Team of the Year (2008) – with John Morrison
  - Worst Feud of the Year (2022) vs. Dexter Lumis
  - Worst Match of the Year (2021) vs. Damian Priest at WrestleMania Backlash
