= SummerSlam (2013) =

WWE pay-per-view event

- Promotional poster featuring various WWE wrestlers
- Promotion: WWE
- Date: August 18, 2013
- City: Los Angeles, California
- Venue: Staples Center
- Attendance: 17,739
- Buy rate: 296,900

Pay-per-view chronology
| ← Previous; Money in the Bank | Next → Night of Champions |

SummerSlam chronology
| ← Previous; 2012 | Next → 2014 |

The 2013 SummerSlam was a professional wrestling pay-per-view (PPV) event produced by WWE. It was the 26th annual SummerSlam and took place on August 18, 2013, at the Staples Center in Los Angeles, California. This was the fifth of six consecutive SummerSlam events to take place at the arena.

Nine matches were contested at the event, including one on the Kickoff pre-show. In the main event, Daniel Bryan defeated John Cena to win the WWE Championship, with Triple H as the special guest referee, only to be attacked by Triple H and lose it minutes later to Randy Orton, who cashed in his Money in the Bank contract. In other prominent matches, Alberto Del Rio defeated Christian to retain the World Heavyweight Championship and Brock Lesnar defeated CM Punk in a No Disqualification match.

The event received 296,900 pay-per-view buys, down from previous year's event of 358,000. This was the final SummerSlam to broadcast exclusively via traditional PPV outlets due to the launch of the WWE Network streaming service in February 2014. It was also the last to feature the previous version of the World Heavyweight Championship, which was unified with the WWE Championship in December.

== Production ==
=== Background ===
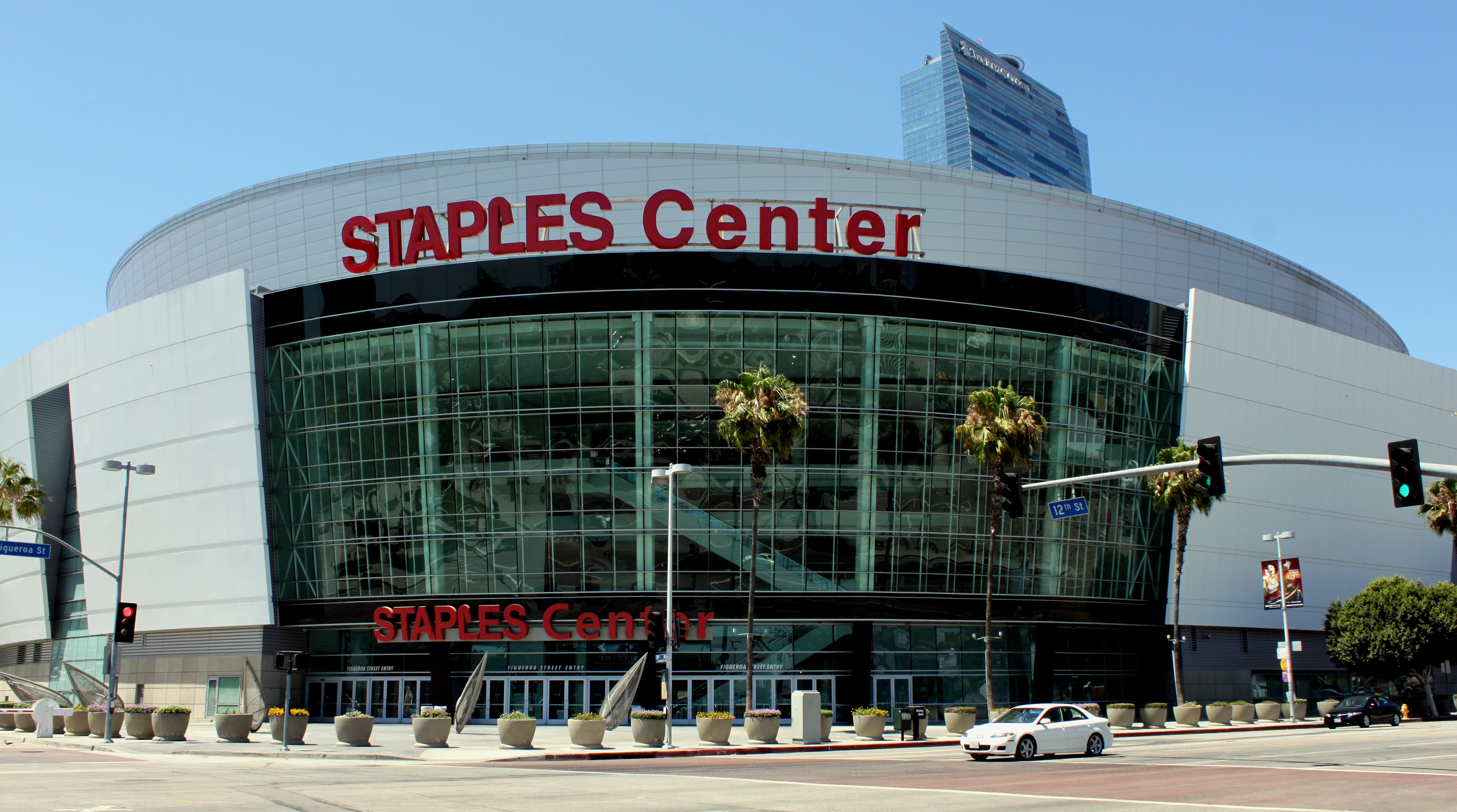
The 26th annual SummerSlam was the fifth of six consecutive years for the event to be held at the Staples Center in Los Angeles, California.

SummerSlam is an annual professional wrestling pay-per-view (PPV) event produced every August by WWE since 1988. Dubbed "The Biggest Party of the Summer", it is one of the promotion's original four pay-per-views, along with WrestleMania, Royal Rumble, and Survivor Series, referred to as the "Big Four". It has since been considered WWE's second biggest event of the year behind WrestleMania. The 26th SummerSlam was scheduled to be held on August 18, 2013, at Staples Center in Los Angeles, California for the fifth consecutive year.

=== Storylines ===
The event comprised nine matches, including one on the Kickoff pre-show, that resulted from scripted storylines. Results were predetermined by WWE's writers, while storylines were produced on WWE's weekly television shows, Raw and SmackDown.

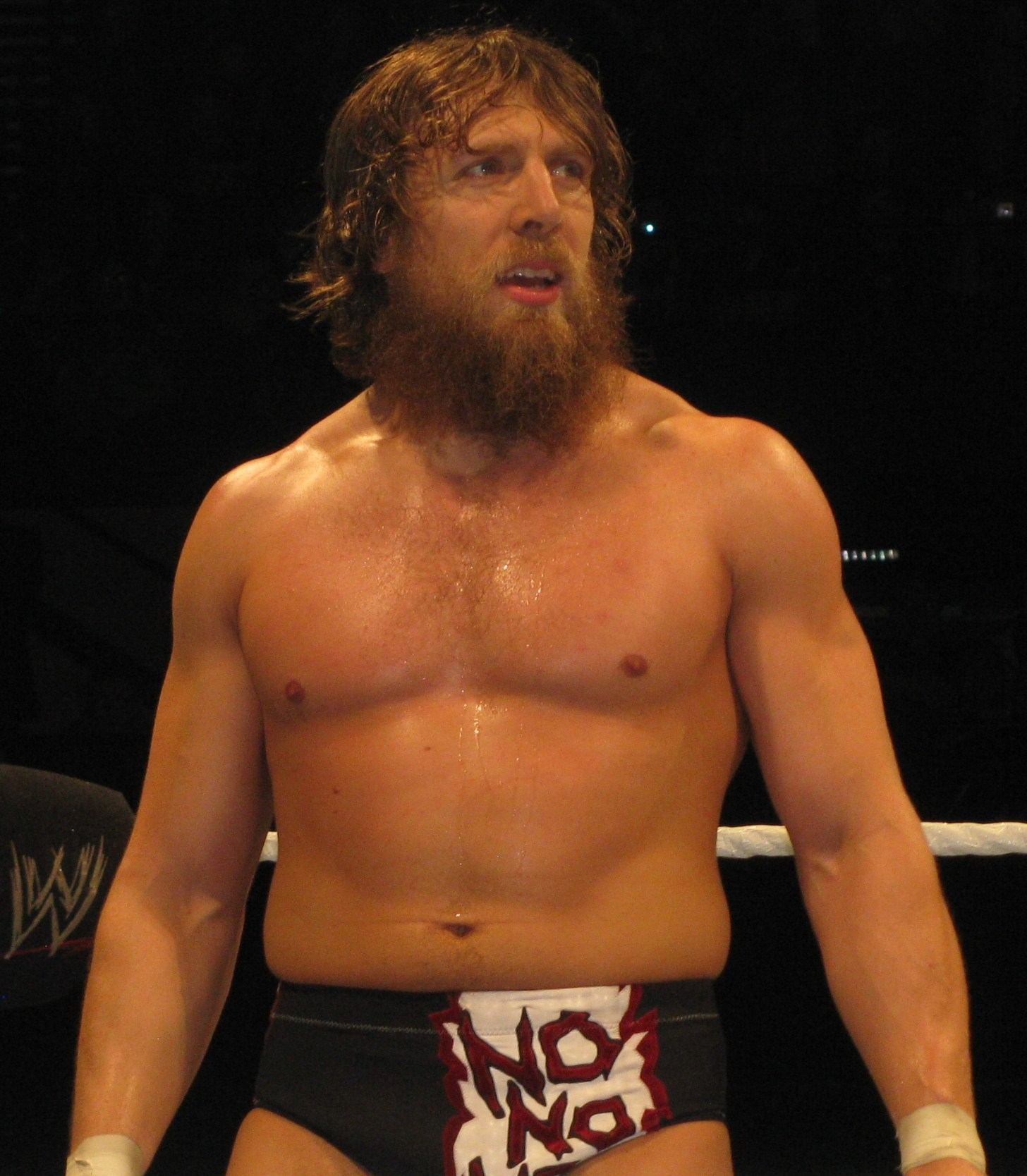
Daniel Bryan won the WWE Championship after defeating John Cena, only to immediately lose the title to Randy Orton, who successfully cashed in his Money in the Bank contract.

On the July 15 episode of Raw, new Raw General Manager Brad Maddox announced that WWE Champion John Cena could choose his own SummerSlam opponent. Later that night, after taking an informal poll of the live audience, he chose Daniel Bryan. In the weeks before SummerSlam, Vince McMahon would berate Daniel Bryan by trying to make him shave his beard, putting him into a gauntlet match against his former friend Kane. On the August 12 episode of Raw, Maddox served as special guest referee in a match with Bryan facing Wade Barrett. After making a quick count to let Barrett win the match, Maddox offered his services as the guest referee for the Cena vs. Bryan match at SummerSlam when Triple H interceded, and announced he'd serve as referee instead (punctuated by a Pedigree to Maddox).

After AJ Lee retained her Divas Championship against Kaitlyn at Money in the Bank and later cost Dolph Ziggler his attempt at winning the World Heavyweight Championship, Ziggler broke up with AJ the next night on Raw, causing her to distract Ziggler in his non-title rematch against Del Rio and leaving Big E Langston to attack him. On the July 29 episode of Raw, Kaitlyn defeated AJ in a non-title match to stay in contention for the Divas Championship, but four days later on SmackDown, AJ defeated Kaitlyn to retain the championship after Layla interfered and protected AJ. A week later on SmackDown, The Miz (the host of SummerSlam) announced that Kaitlyn and Ziggler would face AJ and Langston in a mixed tag team match at SummerSlam.

At Payback, CM Punk defeated Chris Jericho in his return in his hometown. The next night on Raw, he challenged World Heavyweight Champion Alberto Del Rio to a match, turning face. He won by countout, but a returning Brock Lesnar attacked him. Over the next few weeks, tension rose between Punk and Paul Heyman, who cost Punk the WWE Championship Money in the Bank Ladder Match at Money in the Bank. The next night on Raw, Lesnar again attacked Punk. The next week, Punk challenged Lesnar to a match at SummerSlam. Heyman accepted on Lesnar's behalf. During the SummerSlam kickoff show, Heyman announced that both Lesnar and Punk had agreed to make the match no disqualification.

On the July 19 episode of SmackDown, Randy Orton defeated World Heavyweight Champion Alberto Del Rio in a non-title match. However, on the July 29 Raw, Christian also defeated Del Rio in a non-title match. To determine the next challenger for Del Rio's championship, new SmackDown General Manager Vickie Guerrero decided to make a triple threat match between Christian, Orton, and the returning Rob Van Dam. The match ended with Christian reversing Orton's attempt of an RKO into a backslide pin, winning the match and becoming the new #1 contender for the title before being attacked by Del Rio. On the August 9 episode of SmackDown, Christian defeated Del Rio in another non-title match.

At the Money in the Bank pay-per-view on July 14, Damien Sandow won the Money in the Bank briefcase for a future World Heavyweight Championship shot, betraying his former tag team partner Cody Rhodes in the process. Rhodes attacked Sandow after the latter's loss to Christian the following night on Raw. On the July 26 episode of SmackDown, while Sandow was facing Randy Orton in a singles match, Rhodes took his briefcase, causing Sandow to lose the match and search for it. Rhodes threw it into the Gulf of Mexico and Sandow was unable to retrieve it because he couldn't swim It was announced on the August 5 Raw that Rhodes would face Sandow at SummerSlam. Four days later on SmackDown, Sandow debuted his new, brown Money in the Bank briefcase with a new World Heavyweight Championship contract. Later on, after Christian defeated Del Rio in a non-title match, Sandow attempted to cash in his contract, but his effort was thwarted by Rhodes.

On the July 8 episode of Raw, after Kane defeated Christian, The Wyatt Family (Bray Wyatt, Luke Harper, and Erick Rowan) attacked Kane, removing him from competing at the Money in the Bank ladder match for the WWE Championship contract. The Wyatt Family attacked Kane again three weeks later on Raw, after losing to Daniel Bryan. A week later on Raw, after Harper and Rowan defeated Tons of Funk (Brodus Clay and Tensai), Kane announced that he would face Bray Wyatt in a Ring of Fire match at SummerSlam.

On the August 12 episode of Raw, as a result of their feud stemming from starring on Total Divas, Natalya challenged Brie Bella to a match at the pay-per-view, which she accepted by slapping Natalya's face. Natalya also announced that The Funkadactyls (Naomi and Cameron) will be in her corner because Eva Marie has aligned herself with The Bella Twins (Brie and Nikki Bella).

Also on the August 12 episode of Raw, Rob Van Dam won a 20-man battle royal (lastly eliminating Mark Henry) to challenge Dean Ambrose for the United States Championship at the SummerSlam Kickoff Show, one hour before the pay-per-view broadcast.

== Event ==
Other on-screen personnel
| Role: | Name: |
|---|---|
| English Commentators | Michael Cole |
| English Commentators | Jerry Lawler |
| English Commentators | John "Bradshaw" Layfield |
| Spanish Commentators | Carlos Cabrera |
| Spanish Commentators | Marcelo Rodriguez |
| Backstage interviewer | Tony Dawson |
| Ring announcers | Lilian Garcia |
| Ring announcers | Justin Roberts |
| Referees | Charles Robinson |
| Referees | Mike Chioda |
| Referees | John Cone |
| Referees | Rod Zapata |
| Referees | Chad Patton |
| Referees | Triple H (Bryan vs. Cena) |
| Pre-show panel | Josh Mathews |
| Pre-show panel | Booker T |
| Pre-show panel | Shawn Michaels |
| Pre-show panel | Vickie Guerrero |

=== Pre-show ===
During the SummerSlam Kickoff pre-show, Dean Ambrose defended the United States Championship against Rob Van Dam. The match was streamed live on WWE.com, the WWE app, and various social sites. In the end, Van Dam executed a Five Star Frog Splash on Ambrose, but Roman Reigns interfered and attacked Van Dam with a Spear, meaning Van Dam won by disqualification.

=== Preliminary matches ===
The show opened with The Miz welcoming to SummerSlam, with JoJo singing the national anthem after the opening pyro.

The first match pitted Kane against Bray Wyatt in a Ring of Fire match. Following three chokeslams, Kane gestured for a Tombstone Piledriver, but Luke Harper and Erick Rowan overcame the flames using an asbestos blanket and were able to attack Kane, who was attempting to fight them off. Wyatt executed Sister Abigail on Kane for the win. Following the match, Wyatt retreated to his rocking chair and watched Harper and Rowan use two sets of steel steps to smash Kane's skull.

The next match was between Cody Rhodes and Damien Sandow. In the end, Rhodes performed the Cross Rhodes to win the match.

In the third match, Alberto Del Rio faced Christian for the World Heavyweight Championship. Del Rio immediately began targeting Christian's shoulder. The match ended when Christian performed a Spear on Del Rio but his injured shoulder prevented him from covering Del Rio. Del Rio forced Christian to submit to the Cross Armbreaker to retain the title. After the match, Del Rio declared himself (in both English and Spanish) a true role model for WWE's fans.

In the fourth match, Natalya faced Brie Bella. When Eva Marie and Nikki Bella tried to intervene, Cameron and Naomi stepped in on Natalya's behalf, attacking Eva and Nikki. After an Alabama Slam, Natalya forced Brie to submit to the Sharpshooter to win the match.

=== Main event matches ===
In the fifth match, Brock Lesnar faced CM Punk in a no-disqualification match. After some 25 minutes of back and forth fighting involving chair shots, submission holds, aerial maneuvers and outside brawling, Punk executed the Go to Sleep on Lesnar but Paul Heyman broke up the pinfall. Moments later, Punk applied the Anaconda Vice on Lesnar but Heyman interfered. Punk punched Heyman and applied the Anaconda Vise on Heyman but Lesnar broke the hold by hitting Punk with a chair. Lesnar executed an F-5 onto a chair for the victory. Following the match, the crowd loudly chanted Punk's name as he limped back up the ramp.

In the next match, Dolph Ziggler and Kaitlyn fought Big E Langston and AJ Lee. In the end, Kaitlyn executed a Spear on AJ outside the ring. Big E executed a Clothesline on Ziggler for a near-fall. Ziggler executed a Zig-Zag on Big E for the victory.

In the main event, John Cena defended the WWE Championship against Daniel Bryan, with Triple H as the Special Guest Referee. The match was extremely back and forth between the two. After Bryan hit the Yes kicks, Cena got back the upper hand and went for the Five Knuckle Shuffle, but Bryan countered and kicked him. Cena got Bryan down again and this time hit the Five Knuckle Shuffle. Cena went for an Attitude Adjustment but Bryan countered. Bryan hit a missile dropkick for a nearfall. Later on, Bryan locked Cena into an STF but Cena got out, only to get suplexed numerous times before being put in the Yes! lock. Cena escaped the hold and hit the Attitude Adjustment for a two-count. Bryan hit a flying head-butt on Cena for a near-fall, and when he dived to the outside of the ring, Cena countered and regained control. Cena locked Bryan into the STF, but Bryan countered it into the Yes! lock, but Cena reached the ropes. The two continued to go back and forth with a series of moves that culminated after Bryan hit Cena with a kick to the head, followed by a running knee on Cena to win his first WWE Championship. As Bryan celebrated, Cena shook Bryan's hand and offered him advice. Cena shook Triple H's hand before departing. The match would later be named Match of the Year by Pro Wrestling Illustrated.

Bryan continued to celebrate as pyrotechnics were set off and confetti fell into the Staples Center. Randy Orton then appeared with his Money in the Bank contract, walking to ringside and raising the briefcase. Bryan challenged Orton to enter the ring, but Orton turned around and started back up the runway before stopping partway up. Bryan began celebrating again, leading more "Yes!" chants, at which point Orton turned back to face the ring again. Locking eyes with Orton, Triple H turned Bryan to face him, kicked him low and hit Bryan with a Pedigree, turning heel for the first time since 2006. Orton cashed in the contract and pinned Bryan to win the title.

== Aftermath ==
This was the last SummerSlam to feature the World Heavyweight Championship, as the title was unified with the WWE Championship at December's TLC: Tables, Ladders & Chairs event, with the latter being renamed to WWE World Heavyweight Championship. This was also the final SummerSlam to broadcast exclusively via traditional PPV outlets due to the launch of the WWE Network streaming service in February 2014.

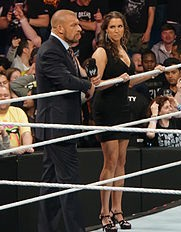
Triple H and Stephanie McMahon created The Authority.

On the August 19 episode on Raw, John Cena addressed the audience, informing them he was temporally leaving WWE due to a triceps surgery. He returned at the Hell in a Cell pay-per-view against Alberto Del Rio for the World Heavyweight Championship. The same day, The Shield (Roman Reigns, Seth Rollins, and Dean Ambrose) and Randy Orton formed an alliance with WWE COO Triple H and Stephanie McMahon, The Authority, which was created to stop Daniel Bryan from regaining the WWE Championship. The storyline between Bryan and The Authority culminated at WrestleMania XXX, where Bryan defeated Triple H to be added in the WWE World Heavyweight Championship main event, thus making it a triple threat match, which Bryan won. The Authority angle would continue, feuding with anyone they felt like, much to the outrage of the fans until WrestleMania 32, where it finally disbanded for good.

Alberto Del Rio's former ring announcer Ricardo Rodriguez began working with Rob Van Dam. On the September 13 episode of SmackDown, he was defeated by Del Rio and was assaulted by him afterwards. Van Dam challenged Del Rio twice for the World Heavyweight Championship at Night of Champions and Battleground, both in losing efforts.

After SummerSlam, AJ Lee ended her partnership with Big E and at Night of Champions, she faced Natalya, Naomi, and Brie Bella for the Divas Championship in a fatal four-way match. During that time, Lee started a feud with the cast of E!'s television series Total Divas by cutting a worked shoot promo criticizing them.

CM Punk continued to feud with Paul Heyman after his loss to Brock Lesnar at SummerSlam by defeating the Intercontinental Champion Curtis Axel on the August 26 episode of Raw.

On the September 2 episode of Raw, Big Show fought Daniel Bryan and attempted to exit the ring before Stephanie McMahon told him to return and knock out Bryan. That same night, Cody Rhodes was fired after losing to Randy Orton. Then, on the September 9 episode, Rhodes' brother Goldust returned in an attempt to earn his brother's job back, but failed to do so. The Authority then invited Cody Rhodes' and Goldust's father Dusty Rhodes on Raw, but after an argument Stephanie McMahon ordered Big Show to knockout the American Dream. At Battleground, Cody Rhodes and Goldust got their jobs back after defeating The Shield's Seth Rollins and Roman Reigns and on the October 14 episode of Raw, they defeated Rollins and Reigns to win the WWE Tag Team Championship in a No Disqualification match due to interference by Big Show, who knocked out all three members of The Shield.

== Results ==
| No. | Results | Stipulations | Times |
|---|---|---|---|
| 1^{P} | Rob Van Dam defeated Dean Ambrose (c) by disqualification | Singles match for the WWE United States Championship | 13:38 |
| 2 | Bray Wyatt (with Luke Harper and Erick Rowan) defeated Kane by pinfall | Ring of Fire match | 7:49 |
| 3 | Cody Rhodes defeated Damien Sandow by pinfall | Singles match | 6:40 |
| 4 | Alberto Del Rio (c) defeated Christian by submission | Singles match for the World Heavyweight Championship | 12:30 |
| 5 | Natalya (with Cameron and Naomi) defeated Brie Bella (with Nikki Bella and Eva Marie) by submission | Singles match | 5:19 |
| 6 | Brock Lesnar (with Paul Heyman) defeated CM Punk by pinfall | No Disqualification match | 25:16 |
| 7 | Dolph Ziggler and Kaitlyn defeated Big E Langston and AJ Lee by pinfall | Mixed tag team match | 6:45 |
| 8 | Daniel Bryan defeated John Cena (c) by pinfall | Singles match for the WWE Championship; Triple H served as the special guest referee. | 26:55 |
| 9 | Randy Orton defeated Daniel Bryan (c) by pinfall | Singles match for the WWE Championship with Triple H as special guest referee This was Orton's Money in the Bank cash-in match. | 0:08 |
(c) / – the champion(s) heading into the match; P / – the match was broadcast on the pre-show
