= Survivor Series (2013) =

WWE pay-per-view event

- Promotional poster featuring The Wyatt Family (Erick Rowan, Luke Harper, and Bray Wyatt)
- Promotion: WWE
- Date: November 24, 2013
- City: Boston, Massachusetts
- Venue: TD Garden
- Attendance: 13,500
- Buy rate: 179,000

Pay-per-view chronology
← Previous; Hell in a Cell	Next → TLC: Tables, Ladders & Chairs

Survivor Series chronology
← Previous; 2012	Next → 2014

The 2013 Survivor Series was a professional wrestling pay-per-view (PPV) event produced by WWE. It was the 27th annual Survivor Series and took place on Sunday, November 24, 2013, at the TD Garden in Boston, Massachusetts. This was the second Survivor Series at the venue, after 2008 when it was known as the TD Banknorth Garden. The event was highlighted by the titular Survivor Series match, a tag team elimination match that pits teams of multiple wrestlers against each other.

Eight matches were contested at the event, including one on the Kickoff pre-show, as well as two Survivor Series matches on the main card. The main event saw Randy Orton defeat Big Show to retain the WWE Championship. In other prominent matches, John Cena defeated Alberto Del Rio to retain the World Heavyweight Championship and CM Punk and Daniel Bryan defeated The Wyatt Family (Luke Harper and Erick Rowan).

The pay-per-view was the worst-selling edition of Survivor Series since the event's inception in 1987; this was attributed to a weak buildup. It received 179,000 PPV buys, down from 212,000 for the previous year's event; and attracted more than 100,000 fewer orders than the 2011 event, which generated 281,000 buys. This was the final Survivor Series to broadcast exclusively via traditional PPV outlets due to the launch of the WWE Network streaming service in February 2014. This was also the final to feature the previous version of the World Heavyweight Championship, which was unified with the WWE Championship at the following month's TLC: Tables, Ladders & Chairs event.

== Production ==
=== Background ===
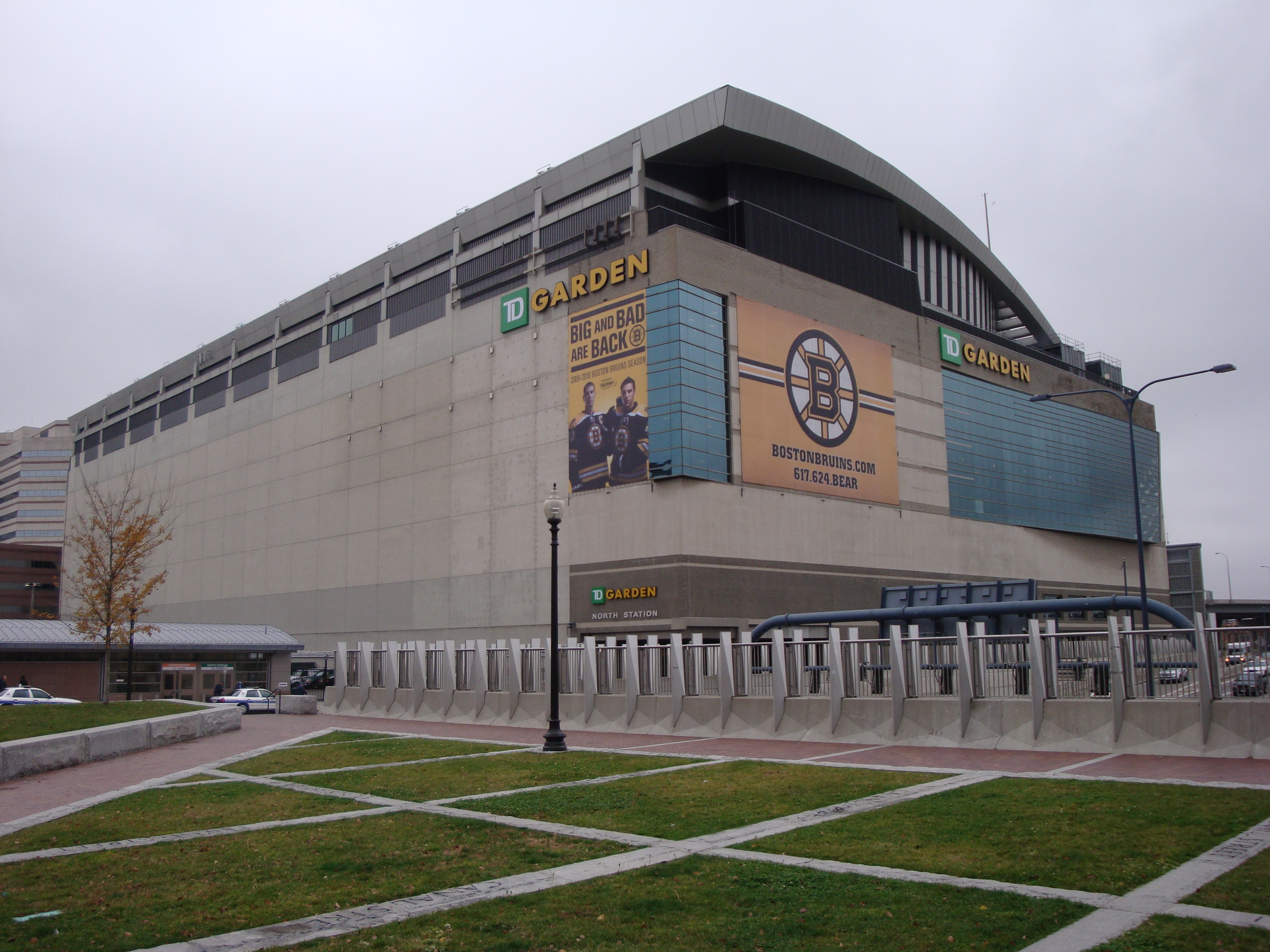
The 27th annual Survivor Series was the second time the event was held at the TD Garden in Boston, Massachusetts, after 2008 when it was known as the TD Banknorth Garden.

Survivor Series is an annual professional wrestling pay-per-view (PPV) event, produced every November by WWE since 1987, generally held around Thanksgiving in the United States. In what has become the second longest-running pay-per-view event in history (behind WWE's WrestleMania), it is one of the promotion's original four pay-per-views, along with WrestleMania, SummerSlam, and Royal Rumble, referred to as the "Big Four". The event is traditionally characterized by having Survivor Series matches, which are tag team elimination matches that typically pits teams of four or five wrestlers against each other. The 27th Survivor Series event was scheduled to be held on November 24, 2013, at the TD Garden in Boston, Massachusetts. This was the second Survivor Series at the venue, after 2008 when it was known as the TD Banknorth Garden (renamed in 2009). Tickets went on sale on September 7 via Ticketmaster.

=== Storylines ===
The event comprised eight matches, including one on the Kickoff pre-show, that resulted from scripted storylines. Results were predetermined by WWE's writers, while storylines were produced on WWE's weekly television shows, Raw and SmackDown.

The main feud heading into Survivor Series featured Randy Orton and Big Show over the former's WWE Championship. Since returning from an injury in mid-August, Big Show had been speaking out against COO and the on-screen regime of Triple H and Stephanie McMahon and their mistreatment of several Superstars, especially Daniel Bryan. This put him at odds with "The Authority", and as a result, Big Show was continuously humiliated by Triple H and McMahon throughout September, and was obliged to knock out several other rebellious wrestlers, owing to a threat of being fired. At Battleground on October 6, Big Show interfered in a match between Orton and Bryan for the vacant WWE Championship, and knocked both competitors out, ruling out the match a no contest. The next night on Raw, he was fired from WWE by McMahon in storyline, but returned later that night to knock out Triple H in defiance. Big Show continued to "illegally" appear over the next several weeks on Raw, assisting Bryan, knocking out Raw general manager Brad Maddox, and costing The Shield's Seth Rollins and Roman Reigns their WWE Tag Team Championship. On the October 21 episode of Raw, Big Show announced he was filing a lawsuit against WWE for wrongful termination from his contract, and two weeks later won an "out-of-court negotiation" with Triple H and Stephanie over his lawsuit, and was rehired by WWE on the condition he promised not to sue them further and received a match against Orton for the WWE Championship at Survivor Series.

The event included two traditional Survivor Series elimination matches, the first of which saw the five-man team of The Shield (Dean Ambrose, Seth Rollins, and Roman Reigns) and The Real Americans (Antonio Cesaro and Jack Swagger with manager Zeb Colter) face off against WWE Tag Team Champions Cody Rhodes and Goldust, The Usos (Jey Uso and Jimmy Uso), and Rey Mysterio, who made a surprise return on the November 18 episode of Raw. The second elimination match pitted Natalya, The Bella Twins (Nikki Bella and Brie Bella), The Funkadactyls (Naomi and Cameron), Eva Marie, and JoJo against Divas Champion AJ Lee, Tamina Snuka, Kaitlyn, Alicia Fox, Rosa Mendes, Aksana, and Summer Rae. This match stems from AJ insulting Natalya and the rest for taking part in the Total Divas reality show.

The other world title in the company was also on the line at Survivor Series, as John Cena defended his World Heavyweight Championship against Alberto Del Rio. After suffering an elbow injury in August, Cena was to be sidelined from action for a minimum of four months. Despite this, SmackDown general manager Vickie Guerrero surprised then-World Heavyweight Champion Del Rio on the October 7 episode of Raw, by naming Cena as his opponent at the Hell in a Cell pay-per-view. At the event, Cena defeated Del Rio to win his third World Heavyweight title, and his fourteenth World title overall. A rematch between the pair was announced for Survivor Series in early November.

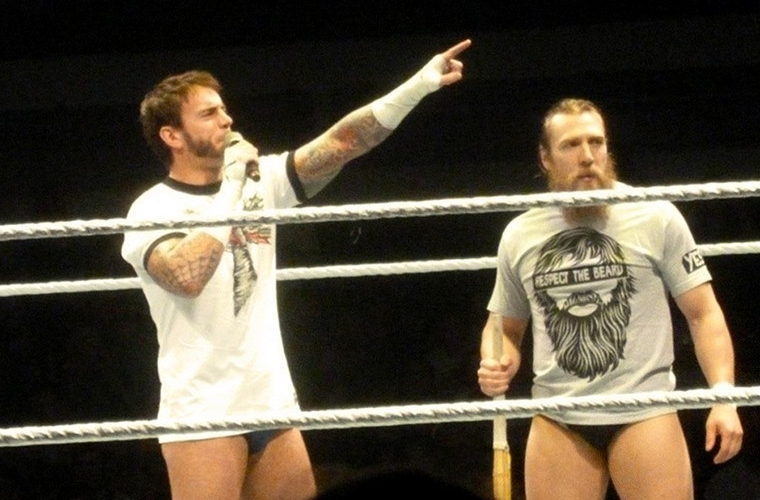
CM Punk (left) and Daniel Bryan allied together to feud with The Wyatt Family heading into Survivor Series.

Another major rivalry pitted CM Punk and Daniel Bryan against The Wyatt Family, an enigmatic backwoods cult composed of Luke Harper and Erick Rowan, led by the faction's namesake, Bray Wyatt. Since their debut in July, The Wyatt Family had been targeting and attacking several wrestlers, including Kane, Kofi Kingston, and The Miz, all in cause of Bray Wyatt exalting his character's preachings and ideals. On the October 28 episode of Raw, the Wyatt Family attacked Bryan backstage, and later attacked Punk in the ring. With Punk and Bryan aiding each other and showing resistance, their altercations with The Wyatts continued over the next several weeks on Raw and SmackDown, until an official match between the teams was announced for Survivor Series.

Also confirmed prior to the event was a match between Kofi Kingston and The Miz for the Survivor Series Kickoff pre-show. On the November 18 episode of Raw, during a match with The Real Americans (Antonio Cesaro and Jack Swagger), The Miz turned against his tag team partner, Kofi Kingston, and walked out of the match. This action allowed Swagger to apply the Ankle Lock on Kingston which he tapped out of giving the win to the Real Americans.

Also on the November 18 episode of Raw, Big E Langston defeated Curtis Axel to win the Intercontinental Championship, and a rematch was later confirmed for the pay-per-view.

== Event ==
Other on-screen personnel
Role:	Name:
English commentators	Michael Cole
English commentators	Jerry Lawler
English commentators	John "Bradshaw" Layfield
Spanish commentators	Carlos Cabrera
Spanish commentators	Marcelo Rodriguez
Spanish commentators	Ricardo Rodriguez
Backstage interviewer	Renee Young
Ring announcers	Lilian Garcia
Ring announcers	Justin Roberts
Referees	Charles Robinson
Referees	John Cone
Referees	Chad Patton
Referees	Ryan Tran
Referees	Marc Harris
Referees	Jason Ayers
Pre-show panel	Josh Mathews
Pre-show panel	Booker T
Pre-show panel	Mick Foley
Pre-show panel	Bret Hart

=== Pre-show ===
The Survivor Series Kickoff pre-show included the panel of Josh Mathews, Bret Hart, Booker T, and Mick Foley previewing the matches. Also on the pre-show, The Miz defeated Kofi Kingston after a Roll-up.

=== Preliminary matches ===
The pay-per-view began with Triple H and Stephanie McMahon coming to the stage, with the two declaring they were allowing no interference in any match tonight.

In the first match, Cody Rhodes, Goldust, The Usos (Jey Uso and Jimmy Uso) and Rey Mysterio faced The Shield (Dean Ambrose, Roman Reigns, and Seth Rollins) and The Real Americans (Antonio Cesaro and Jack Swagger) in a traditional Survivor Series elimination match. Ambrose was eliminated by Rhodes with a roll up. Swagger was eliminated by Jey after a 619 by Mysterio, a Superkick by Jimmy and a Samoan Splash by Jey. Cesaro was eliminated by Rhodes with a roll up. Jimmy was eliminated by Reigns after a Spear. Rhodes was eliminated by Reigns after a Spear. Jey was eliminated by Rollins after a Curb Stomp. Rollins was eliminated by Mysterio with a Roll Up. Goldust was eliminated by Reigns after a Spear. Mysterio was eliminated by Reigns after a Spear, leaving Reigns as the sole survivor.

Next, Big E Langston defended the WWE Intercontinental Championship against Curtis Axel. Big E pinned Axel after a Big Ending to retain the title.

After that, Team Total Divas (Natalya, Nikki Bella, Brie Bella, Cameron, Naomi, JoJo, and Eva Marie) faced Team True Divas (AJ Lee, Tamina Snuka, Kaitlyn, Alicia Fox, Aksana, Rosa Mendes, and Summer Rae) in a traditional Survivor Series elimination match. Fox was eliminated by Naomi after a Split-Legged Moonsault. Cameron was eliminated by Mendes after Mendes tripped Cameron into a Turnbuckle. Mendes was eliminated by Nikki after a Bella Buster. Rae was eliminated by Nikki after a Running Single Leg Dropkick. Marie was eliminated by Kaitlyn after a Fireman's Carry Gutbuster. Naomi was eliminated by Kaitlyn after a Fireman's Carry Gutbuster. Kaitlyn was eliminated by Brie after a Missile Dropkick. Brie was eliminated by Aksana after a Divo Drop. Aksana was eliminated by Nikki after a Rack Attack. JoJo was eliminated by AJ after a Samoan Drop by Tamina. Tamina was eliminated by Natalya after submitting to the Sharpshooter. AJ was eliminated by Natalya after submitting to the Sharpshooter, leaving Natalya and Nikki as the survivors. Despite this, it was announced that Natalya was the sole survivor after commentator JBL said that Nikki had been eliminated.

Ryback came to the ring issuing an open-challenge, with Mark Henry answering the challenge. Henry pinned Ryback after a World's Strongest Slam to win the match.

In the fifth match, John Cena defended the World Heavyweight Championship against Alberto Del Rio. During the match, Cena attempted a Five Knuckle Shuffle on Del Rio but Del Rio performed a DDT on Cena for a near-fall. Cena attempted an Attitude Adjustment on Del Rio but Del Rio countered the move and performed a Bridging German Suplex on Cena for a near-fall. The match ended when Del Rio applied the Cross Armbreaker on Cena but Cena escaped the hold and pinned Del Rio after an Attitude Adjustment to retain the title.

After that, CM Punk and Daniel Bryan faced Luke Harper and Erick Rowan. During the match, Punk and Bryan performed a double Belly to Back Suplex on Rowan for a near-fall. Punk and Bryan performed a Hart Attack on Harper for a nearfall. Rowan performed a Running Splash on Bryan for a nearfall. Punk performed a Diving Elbow Drop on Harper for a nearfall. In the end, Bryan performed a Running Knee on Rowan and Punk pinned Harper after a GTS to win the match.

=== Main event ===
In the main event, Randy Orton defended the WWE Championship against Big Show. During the match, Orton attempted an RKO but Big Show countered and performed a Chokeslam on Orton for a nearfall. After the referee was knocked down, Big Show performed a KO Punch on Orton. The Authority distracted Big Show, allowing Orton to perform an RKO on Big Show. Orton pinned Big Show after a Punt Kick to retain the title. After the match, John Cena confronted Orton. Cena raised the World Heavyweight Championship while Orton raised the WWE Championship as the event ended.

== Aftermath ==
The following night on Raw, WWE Champion Randy Orton came out to talk to The Authority (Triple H and Stephanie McMahon) about causing a distraction in his title defense against Big Show when he was interrupted by World Heavyweight Champion John Cena, who proposed a match against Orton to unify both world titles to determine WWE's undisputed world champion. Triple H agreed and made it a Tables, Ladders, and Chairs match at the TLC: Tables, Ladders & Chairs event on December 15. Orton won the match to unify the titles as the WWE World Heavyweight Championship, which continued the lineage of the WWE Championship while the World Heavyweight Championship was retired with Orton recognized as its final holder. As a result, this was the final Survivor Series to feature the previous version of the World Heavyweight Championship.

Also later that night, The Shield (United States Champion Dean Ambrose, Seth Rollins, and Roman Reigns) faced three members of the opposing survivor series team members in Rey Mysterio and the WWE Tag Team Champions The Rhodes Brothers and were victorious after Ambrose pinned Cody Rhodes. Later that night, The Shield attacked CM Punk after Punk and Daniel Bryan won a match by disqualification against all three members of The Wyatt Family (Bray Wyatt, Luke Harper, and Erick Rowan), who would drag Bryan off before Punk was attacked by The Shield. As a result, two 3-on-1 handicap matches were set at TLC. Punk defeated The Shield while Bryan lost to The Wyatt Family.

On the December 2 episode of Raw, Natalya pinned AJ Lee, to secure a victory for her team in a six-Diva tag team match. After this string of non-title wins, Natalya was officially announced to challenge Lee for the Divas Championship at the TLC event.

Another rematch was the 7-on-7 Divas Survivor Series Elimination Tag Team match would happen.

This was the last Survivor Series to air exclusively via traditional PPV outlets due to the launch of the WWE Network streaming service in February 2014.

== Results ==
No.	Results	Stipulations	Times
1^{P}	The Miz defeated Kofi Kingston by pinfall	Singles match	8:39
2	The Shield (Dean Ambrose, Roman Reigns, and Seth Rollins) and The Real Americans (Antonio Cesaro and Jack Swagger) (with Zeb Colter) defeated Cody Rhodes, Goldust, Rey Mysterio, and The Usos (Jey Uso and Jimmy Uso)^{1}	5-on-5 Survivor Series match	23:23
3	Big E Langston (c) defeated Curtis Axel by pinfall	Singles match for the WWE Intercontinental Championship	5:56
4	Total Divas (Brie Bella, Nikki Bella, Eva Marie, Cameron, Naomi, JoJo, and Natalya) defeated True Divas (AJ Lee, Aksana, Alicia Fox, Kaitlyn, Rosa Mendes, Summer Rae, and Tamina Snuka)^{2}	7-on-7 Survivor Series match	11:29
5	Mark Henry defeated Ryback by pinfall	Singles match	4:46
6	John Cena (c) defeated Alberto Del Rio by pinfall	Singles match for the World Heavyweight Championship	18:49
7	CM Punk and Daniel Bryan defeated The Wyatt Family (Erick Rowan and Luke Harper) (with Bray Wyatt) by pinfall	Tag team match	16:51
8	Randy Orton (c) defeated Big Show by pinfall	Singles match for the WWE Championship	11:10
(c) / – the champion(s) heading into the match; P / – the match was broadcast on the pre-show

=== Survivor Series matches ===
^1

Eliminated	Wrestler	Eliminated by	Method	Time
1	Dean Ambrose	Cody Rhodes	Pinfall	02:13
2	Jack Swagger	Jey Uso	Pinfall	08:13
3	Antonio Cesaro	Cody Rhodes	Pinfall	09:58
4	Jimmy Uso	Roman Reigns	Pinfall	14:33
5	Cody Rhodes	Roman Reigns	Pinfall	15:43
6	Jey Uso	Seth Rollins	Pinfall	16:47
7	Seth Rollins	Rey Mysterio	Pinfall	19:43
8	Goldust	Roman Reigns	Pinfall	22:58
9	Rey Mysterio	Roman Reigns	Pinfall	23:23
Sole Survivor:	Roman Reigns (Team Shield & Real Americans)			23:23

^2

Eliminated	Wrestler	Eliminated by	Method	Time
1	Alicia Fox	Naomi	Pinfall	01:24
2	Cameron	Rosa Mendes	Pinfall	02:28
3	Rosa Mendes	Nikki Bella	Pinfall	02:45
4	Summer Rae	Nikki Bella	Pinfall	03:27
5	Eva Marie	Kaitlyn	Pinfall	04:01
6	Naomi	Kaitlyn	Pinfall	04:34
7	Kaitlyn	Brie Bella	Pinfall	05:12
8	Brie Bella	Aksana	Pinfall	05:42
9	Aksana	Nikki Bella	Pinfall	06:04
10	JoJo	AJ Lee	Pinfall	09:28
11	Tamina Snuka	Natalya	Submission	10:51
12	AJ Lee	Natalya	Submission	11:29
Survivor(s):	Natalya and Nikki Bella (Total Divas)			11:29
