= JoJo (wrestling) =

American ring announcer, professional wrestler, and singer (born 1994)

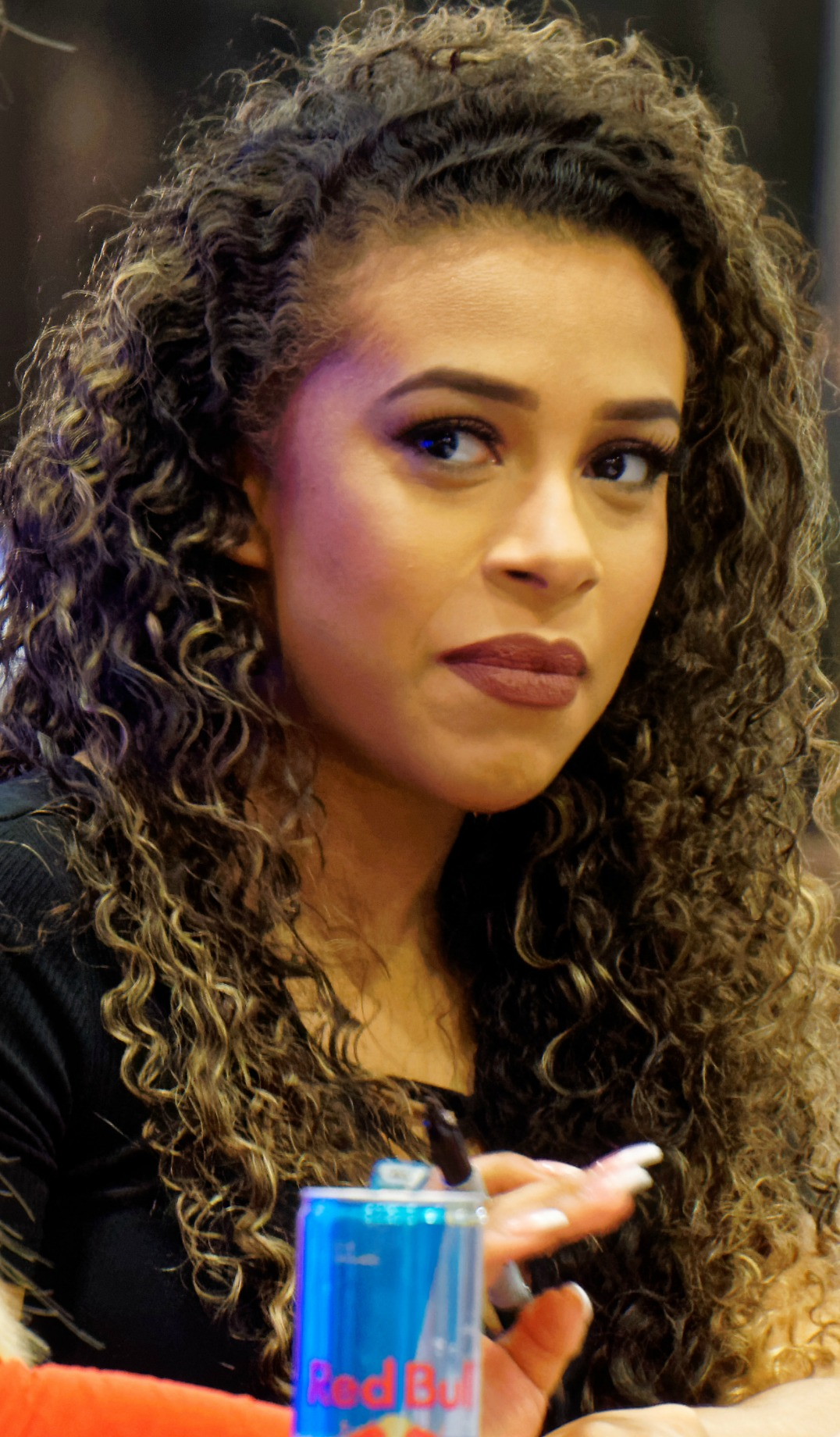
- JoJo in 2016

Personal information
- Born: Joseann Alexie Offerman; March 10, 1994 (age 32) Los Angeles, California, U.S.
- Life partner: Bray Wyatt (2017–2023; his death)
- Children: 2
- Parent: José Offerman (father)

Professional wrestling career
- Ring name: JoJo
- Billed from: Toluca Lake, California
- Trained by: Bill DeMott; Natalya Neidhart; Sara Del Rey; WWE Performance Center
- Debut: June 26, 2013

Joseann Alexie Offerman (born March 10, 1994) is a Dominican-American ring announcer, professional wrestler, and singer. She is best known for her tenure with WWE, where she performed under the ring name JoJo as a ring announcer. She was also a part of the E! Network reality television show Total Divas during the first season, which aired in 2013.

== Early life ==
Joseann Alexie Offerman was born in Los Angeles on March 10, 1994, and is the daughter of Dominican professional star baseball player José Offerman, and was born in the city when her father was a member of the Los Angeles Dodgers. She is of Dominican and Mexican descent.

== Professional wrestling career ==
=== World Wrestling Entertainment / WWE (2013–2021) ===
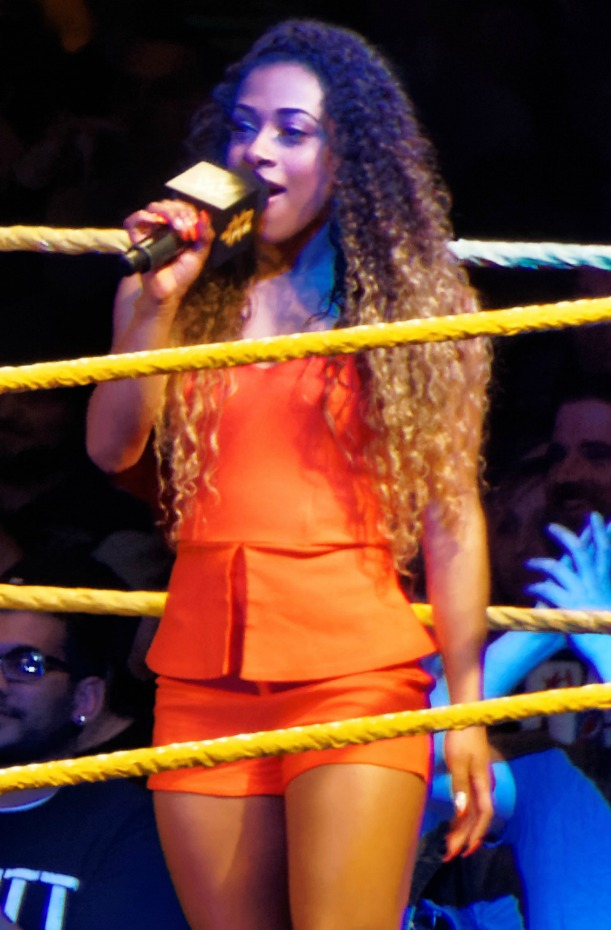
JoJo working as ring announcer during an NXT house show in March 2015

In May 2013, Offerman joined WWE and E! Network's reality show Total Divas, which shows behind the scenes footage of select WWE Divas and a look into their personal lives.

At just 19 years old, Offerman made her main roster debut under the ring name "JoJo" on the June 26, 2013, episode of WWE Main Event, singing the entrance theme for Tons of Funk alongside The Funkadactyls (Cameron and Naomi). Her version of the song was later released on iTunes. The following week on Raw, JoJo appeared in a backstage segment also involving The Bella Twins, Natalya, The Funkadactyls, and Eva Marie. On the July 22 episode of Raw, JoJo along with the cast of Total Divas appeared on Miz TV, where she introduced herself to the crowd. JoJo sang the United States national anthem at SummerSlam on August 18.

On the August 26 episode of Raw, JoJo served as the special guest ring announcer during a singles match between Natalya and Brie Bella. After the match, WWE Divas Champion, AJ Lee interrupted Brie Bella's victory celebration by cutting a worked shoot promo on the cast of Total Divas. Following this, JoJo appeared at ringside to show support for her Total Divas co-stars during their matches. JoJo was booked in her first match on Raw on October 7, teaming with Natalya and Eva Marie in a winning effort against Alicia Fox, Rosa Mendes, and Aksana in a six diva tag-team match, however she was never tagged into the match. The Total Divas defeated The True Divas (Fox, Aksana, Divas Champion AJ, Kaitlyn, Mendes, Tamina Snuka and Summer Rae) in an elimination tag-team match at the Survivor Series pay-per-view, and the following night on Raw in a rematch, where she achieved her first in-ring victory after pinning and eliminating Tamina Snuka.

JoJo later moved to WWE's developmental territory NXT in late 2013, after it was confirmed she would not be returning to Total Divas for its second season. She subsequently became the ring announcer for NXT.

In April 2015, JoJo was promoted to the main roster and began serving as the regular ring announcer on Main Event, SmackDown, Raw and pay-per-views as well as a backstage interviewer. She served primarily as the ring announcer for the Raw brand from 2016 to 2018 and remained under contract until she quietly departed WWE in early 2021, ending her 8-year tenure with the company.

=== All Elite Wrestling (2025–) ===
Offerman made her return to ring announcing with All Elite Wrestling (AEW) on the January 4, 2025 episode of Collision. On July 12, 2025, Offerman made an appearance at AEW’s All In, performing Ain't Nobody during Swerve Strickland’s entrance.

== Other media ==
Offerman was part of the main cast for the first season of the reality television show Total Divas produced by WWE and E!. The show began airing in July 2013. Offerman was replaced by Summer Rae for the second season.

== Personal life ==
Offerman was in a relationship with former WWE wrestler Windham Rotunda, better known as Bray Wyatt. They had two children together. Rotunda and Offerman became engaged on April 28, 2022; however, Rotunda died of a heart attack on August 24, 2023.

== Awards and accomplishments ==
- Pro Wrestling Illustrated
  - Best Ring Announcer (2015)
- Wrestling Observer Newsletter
  - Worst Worked Match of the Year (2013) – with Brie Bella, Cameron, Eva Marie, Naomi, Natalya, and Nikki Bella vs. AJ Lee, Aksana, Alicia Fox, Kaitlyn, Rosa Mendes, Summer Rae, and Tamina Snuka at Survivor Series

== Filmography ==
=== Television ===
| Year | Title | Role | Notes |
|---|---|---|---|
| 2013, 2015–2019 | Total Divas | Herself | Main cast (season 1); Guest (seasons 3–9): 29 episodes |
| 2015 | Swerved | Herself | 1 episode |
| 2016 | WWE Game Night | Herself | 1 episode |
| 2024 | Bray Wyatt: Becoming Immortal | Herself | Documentary of her late fiance, Bray Wyatt. |

== Discography ==
=== Singles ===
| Year | Single | Album |
|---|---|---|
| 2013 | "Somebody Call My Momma" | Non album single |
