= Hell in a Cell (2013) =

WWE pay-per-view event

- Promotional poster featuring R-Truth
- Promotion: WWE
- Date: October 27, 2013
- City: Miami, Florida
- Venue: American Airlines Arena
- Attendance: 9,000
- Buy rate: 212,000

Pay-per-view chronology
← Previous; Battleground	Next → Survivor Series

Hell in a Cell chronology
← Previous; 2012	Next → 2014

The 2013 Hell in a Cell was a professional wrestling pay-per-view (PPV) event produced by WWE. It was the fifth annual Hell in a Cell and took place on October 27, 2013, at the American Airlines Arena in Miami, Florida. The event centered on the men's Hell in a Cell match, a 20-foot-high roofed steel cage that surrounds the ring and ringside area with no countouts or disqualifications and the only way to win is by pinfall or submission in the ring.

The card comprised nine matches, including one on the Kickoff pre-show. Two Hell in a Cell matches were held, including the main event which saw Randy Orton defeat Daniel Bryan to win the vacant WWE Championship with Shawn Michaels as the special guest referee. The other was a Handicap Hell in a Cell match in which CM Punk defeated Ryback and Paul Heyman. In other prominent matches, John Cena defeated Alberto Del Rio to win the World Heavyweight Championship, Big E Langston defeated defending champion Dean Ambrose by countout, thus Ambrose retained the United States Championship as titles do not change hands by countout unless stipulated, Los Matadores (Diego and Fernando) defeated Antonio Cesaro and Jack Swagger, and AJ Lee defeated Brie Bella to retain the WWE Divas Championship.

The event received 212,000 pay-per-view buys, which was up from last year's event of 199,000. This was the final Hell in a Cell to broadcast exclusively via traditional PPV outlets due to the launch of the WWE Network streaming service in February 2014. This was also the final Hell in a Cell to feature the previous version of the World Heavyweight Championship, which was unified with the WWE Championship in December.

== Production ==
=== Background ===
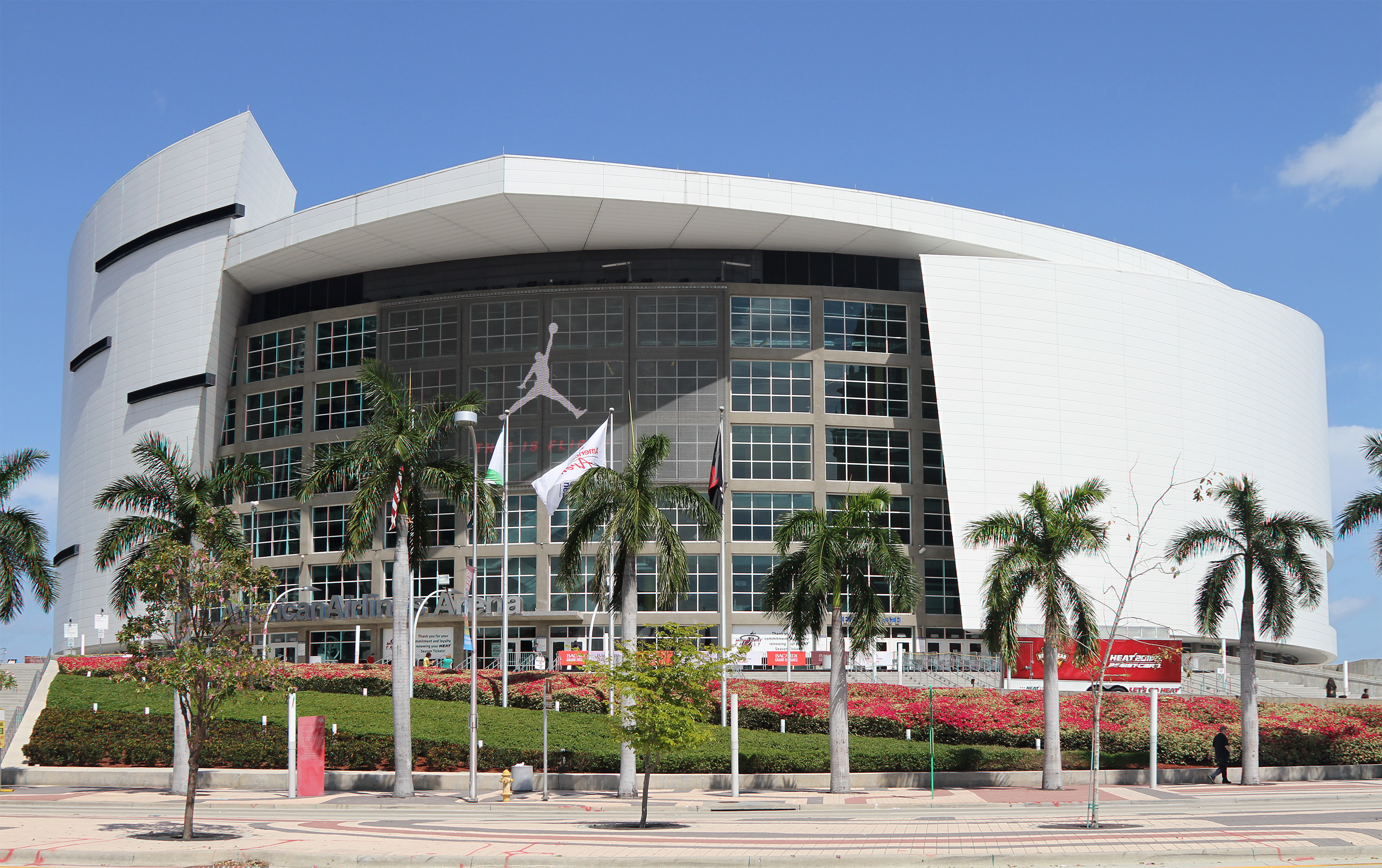
The fifth annual Hell in a Cell event was held at the American Airlines Arena in Miami, Florida.

Hell in a Cell was an annual professional wrestling pay-per-view (PPV) event produced every October by WWE since 2009. The concept of the event came from WWE's established Hell in a Cell match, in which competitors fought inside a 20-foot-high roofed cell structure surrounding the ring and ringside area. The main event match of the card was contested under the Hell in a Cell stipulation. The fifth Hell in a Cell event was held on October 27, 2013, at the American Airlines Arena in Miami, Florida.

=== Storylines ===
The event comprised nine matches, including one on the Kickoff pre-show, that resulted from scripted storylines. Results were predetermined by WWE's writers, while storylines were produced on WWE's weekly television shows, Raw and SmackDown.

The main feud heading into Hell in a Cell was between Daniel Bryan and Randy Orton over the vacant WWE Championship. After defeating John Cena to win the WWE title at SummerSlam in August, Bryan was betrayed by the special referee of that match, Triple H, which allowed Orton to cash-in his Money in the Bank contract and win the championship. In their rematch at Night of Champions in September, Bryan defeated Orton to win back the title, albeit with the referee Scott Armstrong deciding the pinfall with a very fast count. This controversial ending to the match resulted in Armstrong's (kayfabe) firing and Bryan being stripped of the WWE Championship by Triple H the next night on Raw. Bryan and Orton's next scheduled encounter for the now-vacant title on pay-per-view at Battleground on October 6 ended in a no contest after Big Show interfered and attacked both wrestlers and the referees, including a returning Scott Armstrong. With still no WWE Champion yet, on the October 7 edition of Raw, general manager Brad Maddox announced that Bryan and Orton would again compete against each other for the vacant WWE title inside Hell in a Cell and with a special referee for the audience to choose from amongst WWE Hall of Famers Booker T, Bob Backlund and Shawn Michaels; Michaels won the vote.

At Night of Champions, AJ Lee defeated Brie Bella, Natalya, and Naomi to retain the Divas Championship when she made Natalya submit. At Battleground, Brie Bella received a rematch against Lee, but lost when Tamina Snuka attacked Brie's sister Nikki, causing a distraction for AJ to win the match. On the October 18 episode of SmackDown, Brie defeated Lee in a non-title match. The following week, on the October 21 episode of Raw, Brie pinned AJ during a tag team match and earned another opportunity for the Divas Championship.

After defeating Rob Van Dam in a Hardcore Rules match at Battleground to retain the World Heavyweight Championship, Alberto Del Rio tried to coerce SmackDown general manager Vickie Guerrero on the October 7 edition of Raw to formally announce him as the "face of the WWE", making his case saying he was the only World Champion in the company at the moment (the WWE Championship being vacant) and without any new challenger in sight. Later in the evening, during his match with his formal personal ring announcer, Ricardo Rodriguez, Vickie announced that Del Rio would defend his World Heavyweight Championship against a returning John Cena - who had been out of action since SummerSlam due to an elbow injury - at Hell in a Cell.

Another major feud playing out in WWE pitted CM Punk against Paul Heyman and his wrestler clients, whom he dubs "Paul Heyman guys". At the Money in the Bank pay-per-view in July, while still posing as his supporter, Heyman turned on Punk and cost him the Money in the Bank ladder match for a future WWE Championship match. This started a rivalry that soon brought Heyman's client, Brock Lesnar, into the fray, leading to a No Disqualification match between Lesnar and Punk at SummerSlam, which the former won with Heyman's help. At Night of Champions the next month, in a 2-on-1 handicap elimination no disqualification match, Punk eliminated Curtis Axel (another Heyman's client), before beating down Heyman himself. However, Ryback interfered in the match and put Punk through a table, allowing Heyman to pin him and win the match. As the newest "Paul Heyman guy", Ryback faced Punk at Battleground, but lost the match, when Punk pinned him after hitting a low blow behind the referee's back. This loss irked both Heyman and Ryback, and it was officially announced on WWE.com on October 9, that Punk will face off against Ryback in a rematch at Hell in a Cell. On the October 14 episode of Raw, Heyman attempted to convince Maddox to turn the encounter into a 2-on-1 handicap match, with Axel teaming with Ryback. Instead, Maddox set up a "beat the clock" contest in two matches featuring Punk and Ryback individually, with the wrestler to win his match in shorter time than the other to pick the stipulation for their match at Hell in a Cell. Though Ryback defeated R-Truth in a time of 5:44, Punk defeated Axel with 11 seconds to spare, thus "beating the clock". As result of this victory, Punk himself added Heyman to the match as Ryback's partner, additionally making it a Hell in a Cell match, at the Hell in a Cell pay-per-view.

On the October 14 episode of Raw, Cody Rhodes and Goldust defeated Seth Rollins and Roman Reigns of The Shield to win the WWE Tag Team Championship. The next week, Rollins and Reigns fought The Usos (the previous number one contenders) for the next title shot, which ended in a no contest due to Rhodes and Goldust (who was on commentary during this match) attacking a taunting Dean Ambrose. Triple H then announced that all three teams would compete in a triple threat match for the titles.

Another match confirmed for the event featured Los Matadores (Diego and Fernando) taking on The Real Americans (Antonio Cesaro and Jack Swagger).

On the October 18 episode of SmackDown, Big E Langston helped CM Punk fend off an attack by Ryback and Curtis Axel. On the October 21 episode of Raw, Langston pinned Axel in a tag team match. He was then granted a shot at Axel's Intercontinental Championship on the Hell in a Cell Kickoff. Before the Kick-off show began, it was announced that the match between Langston and Axel for the Intercontinental Championship was cancelled due to Axel suffering a hip injury. The replacement match for the Kickoff, announced by WWE on Twitter, would be Kofi Kingston vs. Damien Sandow. Also during the Kick-off, Langston was part of the "expert panel" and was interrupted by The Shield. Dean Ambrose then said that he would defend his United States Championship against Langston later on during the pay-per-view.

== Event ==
Other on-screen personnel
Role:	Name:
English commentators	Michael Cole
English commentators	Jerry Lawler
English commentators	John "Bradshaw" Layfield
Spanish commentators	Carlos Cabrera
Spanish commentators	Marcelo Rodriguez
Spanish commentators	Rey Mysterio
Interviewer	Renee Young
Ring announcers	Lilian Garcia
Ring announcers	Justin Roberts
Referees	Charles Robinson
Referees	Mike Chioda
Referees	John Cone
Referees	Ryan Tran
Referees	Marc Harris
Referees	Rod Zapata
Referees	Chad Patton
Referees	Rudy Charles
Referees	Shawn Michaels (Bryan vs. Orton)
Pre-show panel	Josh Mathews
Pre-show panel	R-Truth
Pre-show panel	Dolph Ziggler
Pre-show panel	Kaitlyn

The Hell in a Cell Kickoff pre-show included the panel of Josh Mathews, Dolph Ziggler, R-Truth and Kaitlyn previewing the matches.

Also on the Kickoff show, Damien Sandow faced Kofi Kingston. Sandow pinned Kingston after a You're Welcome to win the match.

=== Miscellaneous ===
The English commentators were Michael Cole, Jerry Lawler and John "Bradshaw" Layfield while there were also Spanish and German commentators ringside. Lilian Garcia and Justin Roberts were ring announcers.

=== Preliminary matches ===
The actual pay-per-view opened with Cody Rhodes and Goldust defending the WWE Tag Team Championship in a triple threat tag team match against The Usos (Jey Uso and Jimmy Uso) and The Shield (Seth Rollins and Roman Reigns). Rhodes pinned Rollins after executing the Cross Rhodes to retain the titles.

The Miz entered the ring, addressing The Wyatt Family. Miz challenged Bray Wyatt, leading to Luke Harper and Erick Rowan attacking Miz. Kane returned, attacking Rowan and Harper. After the two retreated, Kane Chokeslammed Miz.

Next, The Great Khali and Natalya faced Fandango and Summer Rae in a mixed tag team match. Rae pinned Natalya with a roll up to win the match.

After that, Dean Ambrose defended the WWE United States Championship against Big E Langston. In the end, Big E performed a Spear on Ambrose, who was standing on the apron. Big E re-entered the ring but Ambrose was intentionally counted out, meaning he retained the title. After the match, Big E performed the Big Ending on Ambrose.

In the fourth match, CM Punk faced Paul Heyman and Ryback in a Handicap Hell in a Cell match. Before the match, Heyman entered on a scissors lift and was dropped on top of the cell. The match ended when Punk performed a Diving Elbow Drop on Ryback through a table, hit Ryback with a kendo stick and executed a GTS on Ryback to win the match. After the match, Punk climbed the cell, hit Heyman with a kendo stick and executed a GTS on Heyman.

Next, Los Matadores faced The Real Americans (Jack Swagger and Antonio Cesaro). Los Matadores pinned Swagger to win the match.

After that, Alberto Del Rio faced John Cena, who returned after an arm injury, for the World Heavyweight Championship. Del Rio targeted Cena's arm. Cena attempted an Attitude Adjustment but Del Rio countered into a Backstabber on Cena for a near-fall. Del Rio performed a Step Up Enziguri on Cena, who was on the top rope, for a near-fall. Cena attempted an Attitude Adjustment on Del Rio but Del Rio countered into a Tilt-A-Whirl Backbreaker on Cena for a near-fall. In the end, Del Rio applied the Cross Armbreaker on Cena but Cena performed a Powerbomb on Del Rio to break the hold. Cena pinned Del Rio after an Attitude Adjustment to win the title.

In the seventh match, AJ Lee defended the WWE Divas Championship against Brie Bella. AJ forced Brie to submit to the Black Widow to retain the title.

=== Main event ===
In the main event, Daniel Bryan faced Randy Orton for the vacant WWE Championship inside Hell in a Cell, with Shawn Michaels as the special guest referee. Bryan performed two Suicide Dives on Orton and attempted a third but Orton avoided the move and Bryan collided with the cell wall. Bryan performed a Diving Headbutt on Orton for a near-fall. Bryan applied the Yes! Lock on Orton, who escaped the hold. Orton performed a Superplex onto a pile of steel chairs on Bryan for a near-fall. Triple H argued with Michaels, distracting him from the match. Orton attempted an RKO but Bryan countered, knocking Orton into Michaels. Triple H and a trainer entered the cell to check on Michaels, with Triple H pushing Bryan. Bryan executed a Running Knee on Triple H but Michaels performed Sweet Chin Music on Bryan. Orton pinned Bryan to win the title.

== Aftermath ==
The next night on Raw, John Cena would address the fans about being back for good when he was interrupted by Damien Sandow who unsuccessfully cashed in his Money in the Bank briefcase. Later that night, Alberto Del Rio announced that he still had a rematch clause in his contract, which he used at Survivor Series. Cena defeated Del Rio at the pay-per-view.

After beating Ryback in the Hell in a Cell match and attacking Paul Heyman with a kendo stick and a GTS on top of the cell, CM Punk would face Ryback again in a street fight, which Punk won. As Punk was celebrating the win he was attacked by The Wyatt Family, with Bray Wyatt hitting his finisher and saying the devil made him do it.

After Randy Orton won the WWE Championship for the eighth time after guest referee Shawn Michaels super kicked Daniel Bryan, Michaels would address the fans on why he cost Bryan the match. Bryan would then be invited by Michaels to come down to the ring and Michaels said he interfered in the match because Bryan attacked his best friend, Triple H. Michaels would then ask Bryan to shake his hand and forgive him, but Bryan refused. After Michaels insulted him, Bryan then applied the Yes! Lock to Michaels. During a backstage interview on how he felt about Michaels betraying him, Bryan was attacked by The Wyatt Family.

With both CM Punk and Daniel Bryan being attacked by the Wyatt Family, Punk and Bryan faced and defeated Luke Harper and Erick Rowan at Survivor Series.

Later that night, Orton, Triple H, and Stephanie McMahon held a celebration for Orton winning the WWE Championship. Big Show would then interrupt and told Triple H about the lawsuit he was filing. To prevent the lawsuit, Triple H gave Show his job back, a match against Orton at Survivor Series for the WWE Championship and made Show compete in a 4-on-1 handicap match against Orton and The Shield. At Survivor Series, Orton defeated Big Show and retained the title.

Originally at this pay-per-view, Big E Langston was scheduled to face Curtis Axel for the Intercontinental Championship on the Kickoff, but was postponed due to Axel suffering an injury. However, on the November 18 episode of Raw, Langston defeated Axel, who was medically cleared to compete, to win the Intercontinental Championship.

This was the final Hell in a Cell event to broadcast exclusively via traditional PPV outlets due to the launch of the WWE Network streaming service in February 2014. It was also the last to feature the previous version of the World Heavyweight Championship, which was unified with the WWE Championship in December at TLC: Tables, Ladders & Chairs; the World Heavyweight Championship was immediately retired while the WWE Championship became known as the WWE World Heavyweight Championship.

== Results ==
No.	Results	Stipulations	Times
1^{P}	Damien Sandow defeated Kofi Kingston by pinfall	Singles match	07:01
2	Cody Rhodes and Goldust (c) defeated The Usos (Jimmy Uso and Jey Uso) and The Shield (Seth Rollins and Roman Reigns) by pinfall	Triple threat tag team match for the WWE Tag Team Championship	14:38
3	Fandango and Summer Rae defeated The Great Khali and Natalya (with Hornswoggle) by pinfall	Mixed tag team match	04:50
4	Big E Langston defeated Dean Ambrose (c) by countout	Singles match for the WWE United States Championship	08:43
5	CM Punk defeated Ryback and Paul Heyman by pinfall	Handicap Hell in a Cell match	13:49
6	Los Matadores (Diego and Fernando) (with El Torito) defeated The Real Americans (Jack Swagger and Antonio Cesaro) (with Zeb Colter) by pinfall	Tag team match	05:52
7	John Cena defeated Alberto Del Rio (c) by pinfall	Singles match for the World Heavyweight Championship	15:17
8	AJ Lee (c) (with Tamina Snuka) defeated Brie Bella (with Nikki Bella) by submission	Singles match for the WWE Divas Championship	05:40
9	Randy Orton defeated Daniel Bryan by pinfall	Hell in a Cell match for the vacant WWE Championship with Shawn Michaels as special guest referee	22:04
(c) / – the champion(s) heading into the match; P / – the match was broadcast on the pre-show
