= Cody Rhodes and Goldust =

Professional wrestling tag team

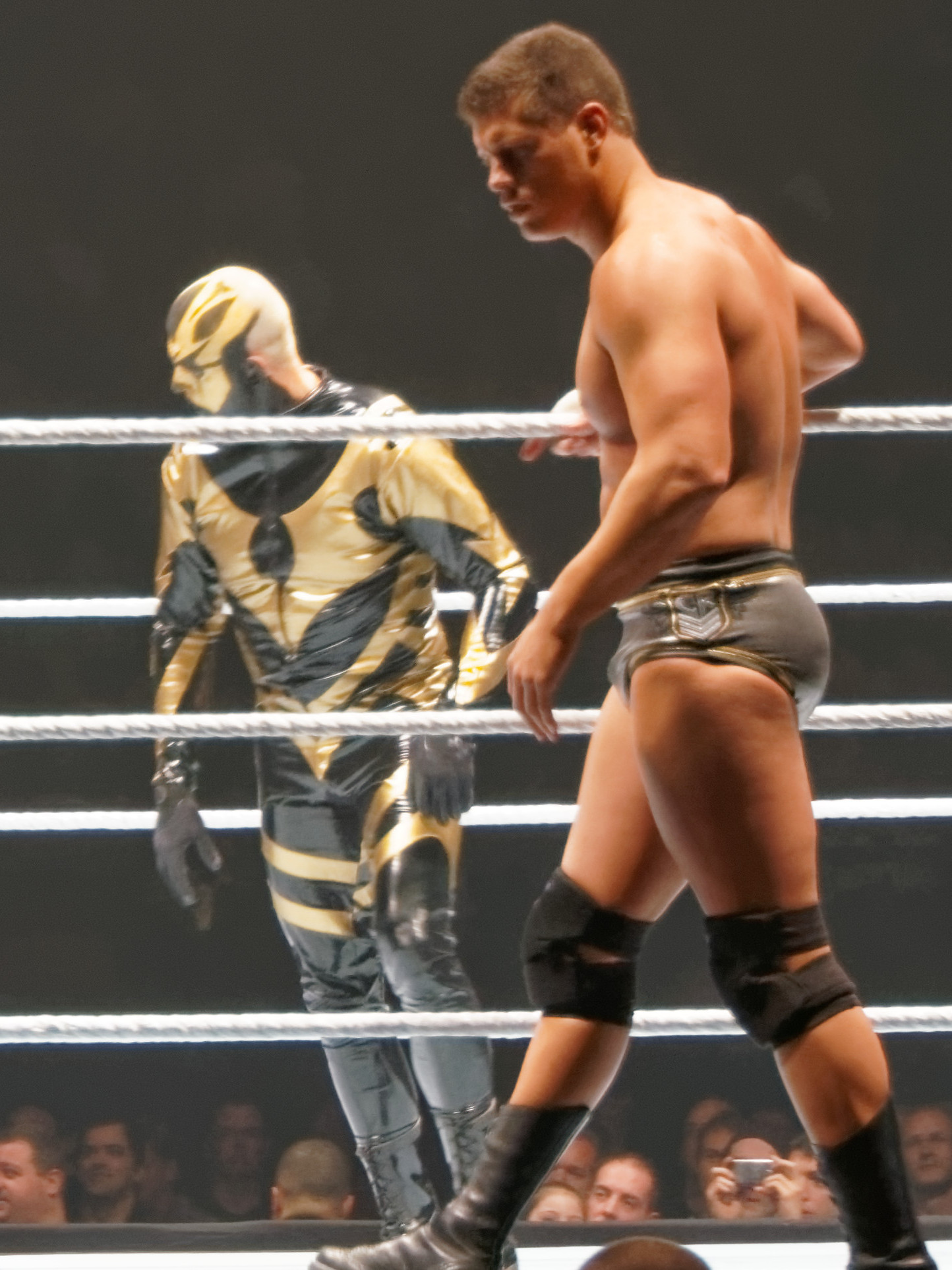
- Cody Rhodes (foreground) and Goldust (background) in November 2013

Tag team
- Members: Cody Rhodes / Stardust / Cody; Goldust / Dustin Rhodes
- Name(s): The Brotherhood; Cody Rhodes and Goldust; Gold and Stardust; The Rhodes Brothers; Cody and Dustin Rhodes
- Billed heights: Cody: 6 ft 2 in (1.88 m); Dustin: 6 ft 6 in (1.98 m)
- Combined billed weight: 452 lb (205 kg)
- Debut: October 6, 2013
- Disbanded: January 8, 2020
- Years active: 2013–2015; 2019–2020

Cody Rhodes and Goldust (also known as Cody and Dustin Rhodes, The Brotherhood, The Rhodes Brothers, and Gold and Stardust) were an American professional wrestling tag team consisting of Cody Rhodes and Dustin Rhodes. They are best known for tenure in WWE and All Elite Wrestling (AEW). Cody and Dustin are real life half-brothers and were once managed by their father, wrestling legend Dusty Rhodes. They were a sub-group of The Elite.

The tag team was formed when Cody was fired (Note: The action was scripted. In real life, Cody took the time off to marry his fiancée, wrestler Brandi Reed.) from the WWE after losing to Randy Orton in a match prompted by Cody's questioning of the company's chief operating officer Triple H's authority. The following week, Goldust fought Orton in an attempt to have Cody rehired, but was also fired after he lost. Dusty attempted to convince The Authority to rehire his sons. Eventually, Triple H and his wife Stephanie McMahon decided that the half-brothers would face the two members of The Shield, Roman Reigns and Seth Rollins, at Battleground, but stipulated that if Cody and Goldust lost, they would never work in the WWE again and Dusty would lose his job as a trainer at the Performance Center. This match marked the debut of Cody and Goldust as a tag team and their victory over Reigns and Rollins led to an immediate return of their jobs. However, after almost eight months, they were disbanded at Payback due to the number of times Cody and Goldust lost. Cody suddenly returned to revive the tag team in June 2014 on Raw under his new gimmick as "Stardust".

They became two-time WWE Tag Team Champions. The first being in October 2013 after they captured the title in a no disqualification match against The Shield (Reigns and Rollins) with help from Big Show on Raw as Cody Rhodes and Goldust, and on 21 September 2014 when they defeated The Usos at the Night of Champions event as Gold and Stardust.

Following the creation of the promotion All Elite Wrestling, where Cody and Dustin serve as in-ring talent (and Cody as a founder and an executive vice president), the Rhodes brothers continued to stay associated and expanded their group to include Cody's real life wife Brandi, WWE Hall of Famers Arn Anderson and Diamond Dallas Page, and close friend Q. T. Marshall, and are collectively known as Nightmare Family (taken from Cody's nickname, "The American Nightmare"). On October 30, 2020, Cody announced on Twitter that Billy and Austin Gunn had joined the group, as well as Lee Johnson. On February 8, 2021, Cody announced on Twitter that Aaron Solow and Nick Comoroto had joined the group.

== History ==
=== WWE ===
==== Early years and confrontations (2009–2010) ====
In 1995, Dustin Runnels, the son of WWE Hall of Famer Virgil Runnels (better known as Dusty Rhodes), was re-signed by the World Wrestling Federation (WWF), as it was then known. (Note: Dustin Runnels (before the Goldust character) made his debut in the World Wrestling Federation with his ring name Dustin Rhodes in 1990.) He was then given the character of Goldust, a somewhat spooky and mysterious persona with sexually suggestive mannerisms, later nicknamed "The Bizarre One". Vince McMahon, the promotion's chairman, described it as "androgynous". In his period of time with the WWF, Goldust went on to become a three-time Intercontinental Champion, a nine-time Hardcore Champion, and a one-time World Tag Team Champion with Booker T. However, his contract expired in World Wrestling Entertainment (WWE), as it is now known, and he refused to renew it in December 2003. In 2008, Runnels returned to WWE as Goldust at Cyber Sunday. After a four-year stint in WWE, he was released in 2012.

His half-brother Cody Rhodes is also fathered by Dusty Rhodes. Cody began wrestling in WWE's developmental territory Ohio Valley Wrestling (OVW) in June 2006. On 2 July 2007, Cody made his television debut in a backstage segment with his father Dusty and Randy Orton, where Orton introduced himself to Cody and disrespectfully slapped Dusty. On 9 July, Rhodes slapped Orton in return and, the following week, Cody faced Orton in his debut WWE match, but lost. In the following years, he would become a two-time Intercontinental Champion and a four-time Tag Team Champion (three World Tag Team Championships and one WWE Tag Team Championship) with Hardcore Holly, Ted DiBiase Jr. (as part of the Legacy group), and Drew McIntyre.

In January 2009, Goldust participated in the annual Royal Rumble match and stared down Cody who ultimately eliminated him. Goldust married (Note: The action was scripted.) Aksana on 2 November 2010 on NXT, with Dusty and Cody in attendance. In 2013, Goldust was a surprise entrant for the Royal Rumble match on 26 January and was once again eliminated by his half-brother. Although he hinted at a possible feud with Cody, he later confirmed in an interview that his return was a one night only deal.

==== The Brotherhood (2013–2014) ====
Renee, it's no secret that I have been the screw-up of the family ... I've got second, third, fourth chances here, I've messed them all up. Cody getting fired is ridiculous, all because of Triple H ... embarrassing my family's name, the Rhodes' name, that's not cool! So tonight, Cody has a second chance, he gets it 'cause I mean business.

— Renee Young interviewing Goldust backstage on Raw.

On the September 2, 2013 episode of Raw, Cody Rhodes was fired from WWE after losing to WWE Champion Randy Orton in a non-title match, which Rhodes was forced into after he questioned the company's chief operating officer Triple H's authoritarian rule. Goldust returned the following week and similarly lost to Orton in a non-title match, thus failing to get his half-brother rehired. Eventually, their father Dusty Rhodes returned to Raw in an attempt to convince Stephanie McMahon to give his sons their jobs back. Instead, McMahon propositioned that Dusty could choose either one of his sons to receive a job, but not both. Dusty refused and Big Show knocked out Dusty as per McMahon's orders. In return, the Rhodes Brothers ambushed Triple H's henchmen the Shield on Raw. The next week, Triple H and Stephanie McMahon (later known as the Authority) offered the brothers their jobs back if they could defeat The Shield's Seth Rollins and Roman Reigns (the WWE Tag Team Championship) at Battleground. If they lost, they would never work in WWE again and Dusty would lose his job as a trainer at the WWE Performance Center. All three members of the Rhodes family were then attacked by The Shield, including United States Champion Dean Ambrose. On 6 October at Battleground, the Rhodes Brothers made their debut match as a tag team with Dusty in the corner and defeated Rollins and Reigns to earn their jobs back. Various WWE wrestlers and agents came out to celebrate with the Rhodes family, including Arn Anderson, Dean Malenko, and Dave Finlay.

On 11 October on SmackDown, the Rhodes Brothers gave The Wyatt Family their first-ever main roster loss. The Rhodes Brothers heaped more misery on The Shield as they defeated Reigns and Rollins in a No Disqualification match to win the WWE Tag Team Championship on October 14 on Raw after interference from Big Show. This was Goldust's first championship in WWE in nearly 11 years.

On the following Raw, The Shield faced the Usos in a number one contender's match, which ended in a no contest after Ambrose provoked the Rhodes Brothers into interfering. As a result, the Rhodes Brothers faced both the Shield and the Usos in a triple threat tag team match for the titles at Hell in a Cell and successfully retained them. The night after the pay-per-view event, the brothers experienced their first loss as champions to The Real Americans (Antonio Cesaro and Jack Swagger) in a non-title match.

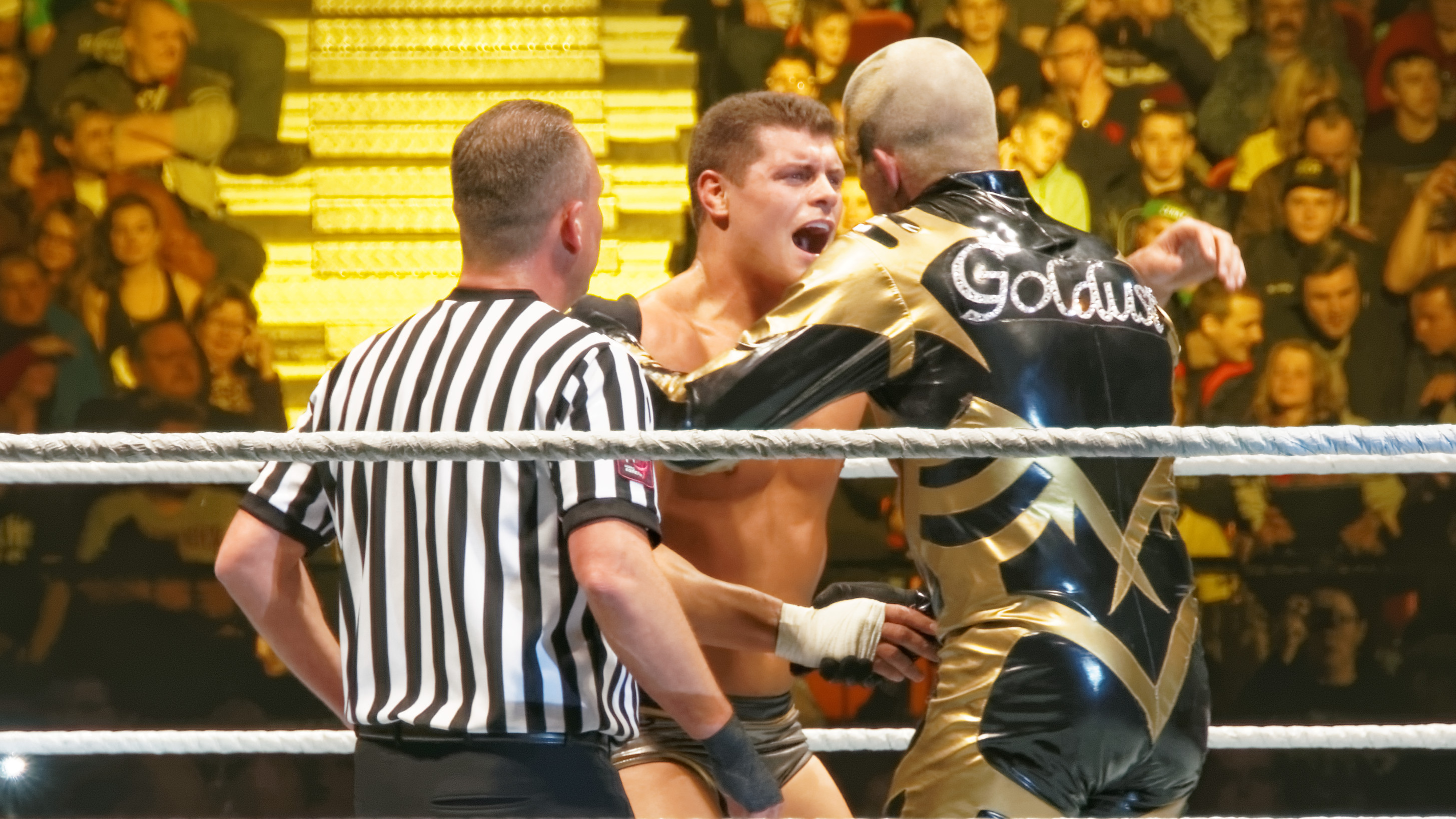
Cody Rhodes & Goldust after a match

In a continuation of their feud against the Authority, on 11 November on Raw, the half-brothers defeated Randy Orton in a handicap match. It was announced the following week that at Survivor Series, the Rhodes Brothers would team up with the Usos and Rey Mysterio against the Shield and the Real Americans in the traditional Survivor Series elimination match, but they lost after both were eliminated by Reigns, who was the sole survivor. On 22 November on SmackDown, the half-brothers defeated the Real Americans to retain their WWE Tag Team Championship. The Rhodes Brothers were scheduled to face the team of Ryback and Curtis Axel, the team of Rey Mysterio and Big Show, and The Real Americans at Tables, Ladders & Chairs, as they had recently been defeated by each of these teams. Once again, they successfully defended their titles.

On 3 January 2014 on SmackDown, the Rhodes Brothers defeated Luke Harper and Erick Rowan of The Wyatt Family to retain the championships and marked their first win of the year. They once again retained the gold on the special Old School Raw episode when they again defeated The Real Americans. However, on the 17 January episode of SmackDown, the half-brothers were defeated in a non-title match by The New Age Outlaws (Road Dogg and Billy Gunn) after a distraction from the General Manager of SmackDown Vickie Guerrero. As a result, The Outlaws were named the number one contenders for the titles. At the Royal Rumble pre-show on January 26, The Outlaws defeated the Brotherhood to end their championship reign. Later that day on the Royal Rumble main show, the Rhodes Brothers participated in the Rumble match; Goldust accidentally eliminated Cody, but was then quickly eliminated. The following day on Raw, their rematch for the tag team titles was inconclusive when the Brotherhood were attacked by Brock Lesnar. Thus, the Brotherhood received a rematch but in a steel cage; they ended up losing to the Outlaws.

In the following weeks, the Brotherhood feuded with different tag teams and stables. On 10 February on Raw, they teamed with Rey Mysterio and challenged the Wyatt Family, but The Rhodes Brothers yielded. On Friday, with the Usos on their team, they won against Ryback, Curtis Axel, and the Outlaws. This led to a victorious tag team match between the Brotherhood and RybAxel (with Larry Hennig) at the Elimination Chamber Kickoff. At WrestleMania XXX, the half-brothers participated in the 31-man battle royal for the André the Giant Memorial Trophy, and were both eliminated by Alberto Del Rio.

The Brotherhood then returned for tag team action with consecutive losses to RybAxel and the Usos; after the latter loss on 21 April, dissension was teased between the brothers when Cody shoved Goldust and left by himself. After that, more tension was built up when Cody began frequently losing singles matches while Goldust frequently won; Goldust notably scored wins over Alberto Del Rio and Curtis Axel, two opponents which Cody lost to. When Cody managed a win over Damien Sandow in May, it was only because he resorted to cheating. The team disbanded at Payback on 1 June when they lost to RybAxel, with Cody telling Goldust to look for a new partner, after he felt he was the weak link in the team. Cody then attempted to find a new tag team partner for Goldust, such as Sin Cara or R-Truth, but the new teams still lost their tag matches.

==== Gold and Stardust (2014–2015) ====
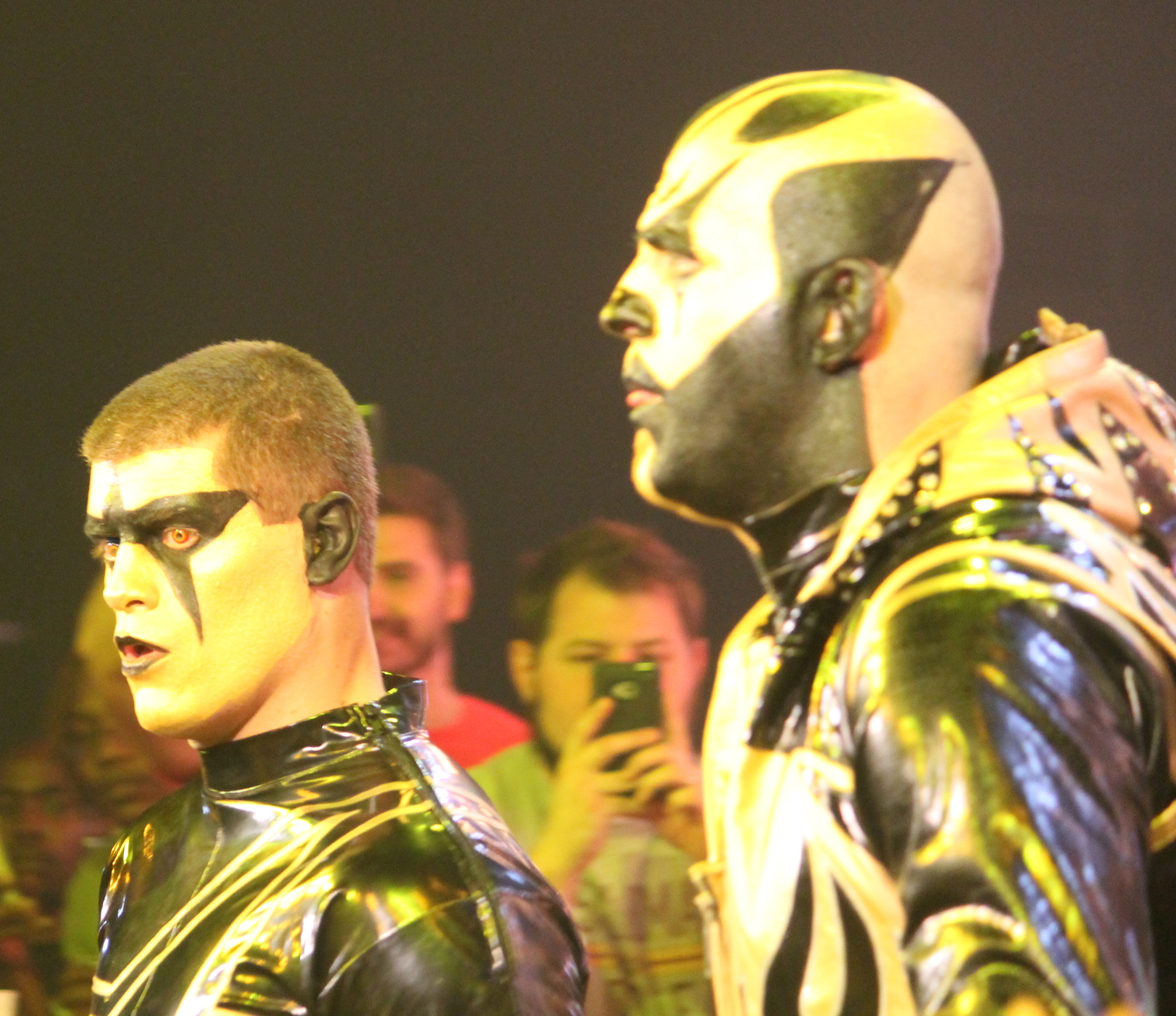
Gold and Stardust in September 2014

On the 16 June episode of Raw, Cody announced that he had found the perfect tag partner for Goldust. This turned out to be himself, appearing under the ring name Stardust while wearing a jumpsuit and face paint similar to Goldust. The two quickly defeated RybAxel on that night, and also at the Money in the Bank.

After weeks of primarily appearing in vignettes cryptically expressing their desires to acquire "The Cosmic Key" (their name for the WWE Tag Team Championships) that The Usos now have, they successfully defeated The Usos in a non-title match on the 18 August episode of Raw. On the 25 August episode of Raw, they challenged The Usos for the Tag Team Championships and won by countout, thus not winning the championships. They would accuse the Usos of a purposeful countout to retain the titles, and then attacked them, turning heel in the process.

At Night of Champions, Goldust and Stardust, now referred to simply as Gold and Stardust, defeated The Usos for their second WWE Tag Team Championship, and successfully retained them against the Usos in a rematch at Hell in a Cell. They also successfully retained their titles the following night on Raw; after Mark Henry turned on his partner Big Show to give Stardust the pin. After trading wins throughout the tag division over the next few weeks; Gold and Stardust lost the WWE Tag Team Championship to The Miz and Damien Mizdow in a Fatal 4-Way match in Survivor Series that also included the Usos and Los Matadores, ending their second title reign at 63 days. After failing in regaining their titles the next night on Raw, the following SmackDown, the duo cut a more sinister promo than usual on their loss of the Cosmic Key, claiming that "science" had failed them and adding that "darkness would fall on the New Day", possibly referring to a stable that had debuted on the same episode. After being hastily defeated in a number one contender Tag Team Turmoil on the 1 December edition of Raw by Kofi Kingston and Big E; Gold and Stardust returned later on in the match and attacked their manager, Xavier Woods, distracting them enough to cost them the match, thus setting up a feud. A match between the two teams was scheduled for the Kick-Off show of TLC: Tables, Ladders and Chairs on 14 December, where Big E and Kingston defeated Gold and Stardust.

==== Disbandment and feud (2015) ====
In early 2015, the two again began showing signs of tension between them as Stardust became further entrenched in his gimmick, leaving Goldust to try and communicate with his brother through his new persona. Stardust would respond to this by walking out on Goldust on the February 5 episode of SmackDown before their match had concluded. On the February 16 edition of Raw, Dusty Rhodes returned to speak to his sons for the first time since their debut in an attempt to smooth out the problems they were having. While Cody seemed to be in agreement with his family at first, Stardust hit his old finisher Cross-Rhodes on Goldust after he took the loss for their team in a match against The New Day, dissolving their partnership entirely. When Dusty approached Stardust backstage afterward, Stardust claimed that it was Dusty and Goldust that were responsible for the intense pressure Cody was subjected to from a young age. He then stated that Cody, and now his own family, were dead to him. A match between Goldust and Stardust was set for Fastlane, with Goldust promising to vanquish Stardust, reclaim his brother, and rekindle their partnership. Due to their father asking Goldust not to cause any real harm to Cody, Goldust won their first encounter via roll-up. Backstage, Stardust viciously assaulted Goldust and again proclaimed that his mental decline was his family's fault.

On November 22 at Survivor Series, Goldust returned to team up with The Dudley Boyz, Neville, and Titus O'Neil to face his half-brother Stardust, The Ascension, The Miz, and Bo Dallas in a ten-man tag team match, where Goldust's team emerged victorious. The following night on Raw, Goldust teamed up with The Prime Time Players to take on his brother Stardust and The Ascension in another match, which Goldust's team won also after O'Neil hit Konnor with his move Clash of the Titus. Cody Rhodes was released by WWE in 2016, bringing an end to their storied rivalry and chances of a reunion in that company.

=== All Elite Wrestling (2019–2020) ===
After facing each other in a grueling match at AEW Double or Nothing, Cody asked his brother, now going by his original ring name Dustin Rhodes, to team up with him at Fight for the Fallen to go up against The Young Bucks. On the January 8, 2020 episode of AEW Dynamite, Rhodes Brothers teamed up to take on Lucha Brothers.

Throughout 2020, The Nightmare Family would become a stable who mostly supports Cody Rhodes in big matches while also teaming amongst themselves, the group consists firmly by Cody Rhodes, his wife Brandi Rhodes, his brother Dustin Rhodes, his manager/coach Arn Anderson, Q. T. Marshall, Lee Johnson and The Gunn Club. Diamond Dallas Page is also a part-time member.

== Championships and accomplishments ==
- WWE
  - WWE Tag Team Championship (2 times)
  - Slammy Award
    - Tag Team of the Year (2013)

== See also ==
- The Nightmare Family
