= TLC: Tables, Ladders & Chairs (2013) =

WWE pay-per-view event

- Promotional poster depicting tables, ladders and chairs and a rose bouquet split in half.
- Promotion: WWE
- Date: December 15, 2013
- City: Houston, Texas
- Venue: Toyota Center
- Attendance: 14,120
- Buy rate: 181,000
- Tagline: It's Not Tender, Loving Care...It's Tables, Ladders and Chairs

Pay-per-view chronology
← Previous; Survivor Series	Next → Royal Rumble

TLC: Tables, Ladders & Chairs chronology
← Previous; 2012	Next → 2014

The 2013 TLC: Tables, Ladders & Chairs was a professional wrestling pay-per-view (PPV) event produced by WWE. It was the fifth annual TLC: Tables, Ladders & Chairs and took place on December 15, 2013, at the Toyota Center in Houston, Texas. The concept of the show was based around the primary matches of the card each utilizing tables, ladders, and chairs as legal weapons.

Nine matches were contested at the event, including one on the Kickoff pre-show. In the main event, WWE Champion Randy Orton defeated World Heavyweight Champion John Cena in a Winner Takes All Tables, Ladders, and Chairs match to unify the titles as the WWE World Heavyweight Championship. The unified title continued the lineage of the WWE Championship while the World Heavyweight Championship was immediately retired with Orton recognized as its final holder. In other prominent matches, Cody Rhodes and Goldust retained the WWE Tag Team Championship in a fatal four-way tag team elimination match against Big Show and Rey Mysterio, The Real Americans (Jack Swagger and Antonio Cesaro), and RybAxel (Ryback and Curtis Axel), The Wyatt Family (Bray Wyatt, Luke Harper, and Erick Rowan) defeated Daniel Bryan in a 3-on-1 handicap match, and in the opening bout, CM Punk defeated The Shield (Roman Reigns, Seth Rollins, and Dean Ambrose) in a 3-on-1 handicap match.

This was the last TLC event to air exclusively via traditional PPV outlets due to the launch of the WWE Network streaming service in February 2014.

== Production ==
=== Background ===
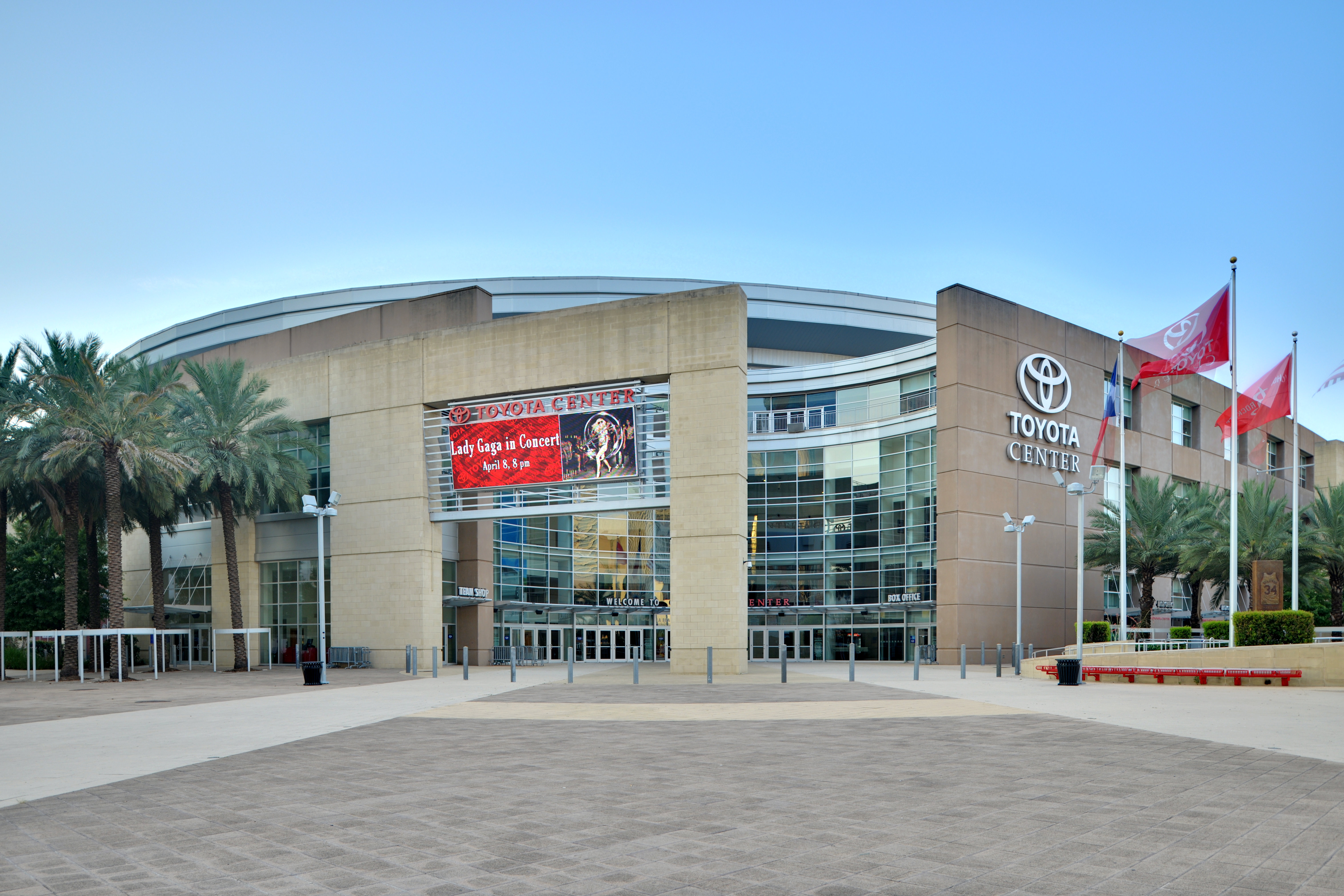
The fifth annual TLC: Tables, Ladders & Chairs was held at the Toyota Center in Houston, Texas.

TLC: Tables, Ladders & Chairs was an annual professional wrestling pay-per-view (PPV) event produced every December by WWE since 2009. The concept of the event was based on the primary matches of the card each containing a stipulation using tables, ladders, and chairs as legal weapons, with the main event generally being a Tables, Ladders, and Chairs match. The fifth TLC event was scheduled to take place on December 15, 2013, at the Toyota Center in Houston, Texas. Tickets went on sale on September 21.

In December 2014, CM Punk revealed in his podcast interview with Colt Cabana that he requested the day of the event off to attend C. J. Wilson's wedding; however, the company failed to fulfill his request. As a result, he and his girlfriend at the time (now wife) AJ Lee's matches went first and second so they could leave on time and attend the wedding in California the same day.

=== Storylines ===
The event comprised nine matches, including one on the Kickoff pre-show, that resulted from scripted storylines. Results were predetermined by WWE's writers, while storylines were produced on WWE's weekly television shows, Raw and SmackDown.

The main rivalry heading into TLC featured the World Heavyweight Champion John Cena, and the WWE Champion Randy Orton, over who was the proverbial "face of the WWE". Ever since SummerSlam in August, Orton had been engaged in a feud with Daniel Bryan over the WWE Championship, and owing to his alliance with The Authority (Triple H and Stephanie McMahon), finally settled his rivalry with Bryan at the Hell in a Cell event, defeating him in a Hell in a Cell match to win the WWE title for the eighth time. However, over time, The Authority started showing doubt over Orton's ability to win matches on his own accord. To prove he still was their chosen "face of the WWE", Orton was made to defend his championship against the anti-Authority Big Show at Survivor Series in November, who Orton defeated to retain his title, but only after Big Show was distracted by Triple H. Concurrently, Cena defeated Alberto Del Rio at Survivor Series to retain his World Heavyweight Championship in a rematch from the Hell in a Cell event, where Cena returned from an elbow injury seemingly before schedule, yet still defeated Del Rio to win the title for the third time. After Orton's victory at Survivor Series, Cena came down to the ring with his title, and celebrated with the crowd as The Authority looked on, much to Orton's chagrin. The next night, on the November 25 episode of Raw, after another confrontation between the two world champions, Triple H announced that Orton would face Cena in a Tables, Ladders, and Chairs match, with both the WWE Championship and the World Heavyweight Championship on the line, at the TLC pay-per-view, with the winner becoming the "Champion of Champions".

Another championship match at the TLC pay-per-view saw AJ Lee defending the WWE Divas Championship against Natalya. At Survivor Series, Natalya, along with Nikki Bella, were the "Survivors" after making AJ submit in a seven-on-seven Survivor Series elimination match between the "True Divas" and the Total Divas. On the December 2 episode of Raw, Natalya pinned AJ to secure a victory for her team in a six-Diva tag team match. After this string of non-title wins, Natalya was officially announced to challenge AJ for the Divas Championship at the TLC event.

Since late October, both CM Punk and Daniel Bryan had been assaulted by the Wyatt Family (Bray Wyatt, Luke Harper, and Erick Rowan), which led to a tag team match at Survivor Series in November with Punk and Bryan going up against - and defeating - Harper and Rowan. The next night, on the November 25 episode of Raw, Bryan was (kayfabe) "abducted" by the Wyatt Family, while Punk was ambushed by The Shield, another notorious three-man faction consisting of Dean Ambrose, Seth Rollins, and Roman Reigns. On the December 2 episode of Raw, Punk tried tracing back the reason for the attack on him to Triple H, believing he called for Punk to be taken out for the latter's rebellious comments against The Authority. After these allegations were rebuked by Triple H's wife, Stephanie McMahon, WWE's (kayfabe) Director of Operations, Kane, also came out to support The Authority, and after being insulted by Punk, announced a three-on-one handicap match at the TLC event, pitting Punk against all three members of The Shield. Also, on the same night, after defeating Erick Rowan, Bryan too was put in a three-on-one handicap match by Kane - much like Punk - to face all three members of the Wyatt Family at the TLC pay-per-view.

Also, on the December 9 episode of Raw, Damien Sandow defeated Santino Marella to earn the right to face Big E Langston for the WWE Intercontinental Championship at the TLC event.

Also, on the December 13 episode of SmackDown, it was announced that Cody Rhodes and Goldust would defend the WWE Tag Team Championship against The Real Americans (Jack Swagger and Antonio Cesaro), RybAxel (Ryback and Curtis Axel), and Big Show and Rey Mysterio in a fatal four-way tag team match at the pay-per-view.

The TLC Kickoff pre-show featured Fandango squaring off against Dolph Ziggler. This match was announced at the 2013 Slammy Awards edition of Raw on December 9, 2013.

Kofi Kingston and The Miz teamed together to face The Real Americans on the October 21 episode of Raw, but at the end of the match, Miz turned on Kingston. This led to a match on the Survivor Series Kickoff pre-show, which Miz won. The feud continued and culminated in a no disqualifications match between Kofi Kingston and the Miz at the TLC event.

== Event ==
Other on-screen personnel
Role:	Name:
English commentators	Michael Cole
English commentators	Jerry Lawler
English commentators	John "Bradshaw" Layfield
Spanish commentators	Carlos Cabrera
Spanish commentators	Marcelo Rodriguez
Spanish commentators	Ricardo Rodriguez
Interviewer	Renee Young
Ring announcers	Lilian Garcia
Ring announcers	Justin Roberts
Referees	Charles Robinson
Referees	John Cone
Referees	Mike Chioda
Referees	Ryan Tran
Referees	Rod Zapata
Referees	Chad Patton
Pre-show Panel	Josh Mathews
Pre-show Panel	Mick Foley
Pre-show Panel	Booker T
Pre-show Panel	The Miz

=== Pre-show ===
The TLC: Tables, Ladders & Chairs Kickoff pre-show included the Kickoff panel of Josh Mathews, Mick Foley, Booker T, and The Miz previewing the matches. Later on the Kickoff show, Kofi Kingston attacked The Miz in the panel, setting a No Disqualification match later at the event. Before the pay per view started, Fandango defeated Dolph Ziggler after a Diving Leg Drop.

=== Preliminary matches ===
In the first match, The Shield (Dean Ambrose, Seth Rollins and Roman Reigns) faced CM Punk in a 3-on-1 Handicap match. In the end, Punk performed a Go To Sleep on Rollins before attempting another one on Ambrose, who countered. Reigns then attempted a spear on Punk, but Punk moved out of the way and Ambrose was hit instead. Punk threw Reigns out of the ring and pinned Ambrose to win the match.

Next, AJ Lee defended the WWE Divas Championship against Natalya. The match ended when Natalya attempted to apply the Sharpshooter but AJ pulled Natalya's hair and pinned Natalya with a Roll Up to retain the title.

After that, Big E Langston defended the Intercontinental Championship against Damien Sandow. Langston pinned Sandow after a Big Ending to retain the title.

In the fourth match, Cody Rhodes and Goldust defended the WWE Tag Team Championship against Big Show and Rey Mysterio, Rybaxel (Ryback and Curtis Axel), and The Real Americans (Jack Swagger and Antonio Cesaro). RybAxel were eliminated after Goldust pinned Ryback with a Roll Up. The Real Americans were eliminated after Big Show pinned Cesaro following a KO Punch. Big Show and Mysterio were eliminated after Rhodes pinned Mysterio following Cross Rhodes, resulting in Rhodes and Goldust retaining the titles.

Next, R-Truth faced Brodus Clay. R-Truth pinned Clay with a rollup to win the match.

After that, Kofi Kingston faced The Miz in a no-disqualification match. In the end, Miz collided with an exposed turnbuckle and Kingston pinned Miz after Trouble in Paradise to win the match.

In the penultimate match, Daniel Bryan faced The Wyatt Family (Bray Wyatt, Luke Harper, and Erick Rowan). Wyatt pinned Bryan after Sister Abigail to win the match.

=== Main event ===
In the main event, WWE Champion Randy Orton faced World Heavyweight Champion John Cena in a Tables, Ladders, and Chairs match to unify the titles as the WWE World Heavyweight Championship. During the match, both competitors used various weapons on each other including ladders and chairs, and attempted to retrieve the belts several times. Orton countered a Five Knuckle Shuffle attempt from Cena and threw him into a chair wedged in the corner but Cena instead performed a Five Knuckle Shuffle off a ladder on Orton. Cena then hit Orton off the apron with a ladder which sent him through a table set up at ringside. As Cena attempted to retrieve the belts, Orton pushed Cena off the ladder and performed an RKO on him. After the two brawled outside the ring, Orton hit Cena with a microphone before setting up for a Punt Kick, but Cena avoided the move and sent Orton through the Spanish announce table with an Attitude Adjustment.

Cena attempted to retrieve the belts but Orton pushed the ladder over, leaving Cena hanging from the belts. Orton then hit Cena with a chair, knocking him down. Orton continued to hit Cena with a chair until Cena countered and drove Orton through a table set up in the corner. Orton retrieved a pair of handcuffs hidden under the floor and handcuffed Cena to the bottom rope before throwing the key away into the crowd. Cena tried to use a ladder and a chair to try and break the handcuffs as Orton set up another ladder and began to climb up. Cena eventually freed himself by unscrewing the turnbuckle and used the handcuffs to knock Orton off the ladder. Cena attempted to unhook the belts with one hand, but was unable to. Orton grabbed the loose rope and used it to pull Cena off the ladder, sending him head first through a table set up in the corner. Orton retrieved the belts, unifying the titles and becoming the WWE World Heavyweight Champion, which continued the lineage of the WWE Championship while the World Heavyweight Championship was retired with Orton recognized as its final holder.

== Aftermath ==
The next night on Raw, The Authority celebrated Randy Orton's unification of the championships inside the ring, with the entire WWE locker room standing on the entrance ramp. John Cena proclaimed that since Orton won, his first title defense should be against Daniel Bryan, insisting that was the right thing to do. Orton refused, but The Authority said that Orton would, in fact, face Bryan in a non-title match later that night. Bryan went on to win that match via disqualification, which was caused by a blatant low-blow from Orton - right in front of the referee. Orton then continued to attack Bryan until Cena came out to aid Bryan. Orton scattered, but when Cena went to check on Bryan's condition, Orton reemerged, striking Cena with an RKO. The show ended with Orton standing triumphantly over his fallen foes with both titles raised overhead. On the December 30 episode, Stephanie McMahon announced that Cena would get his rematch against Orton at the Royal Rumble with no outside interference or added stipulations, which Orton won.

Big Show and Rey Mysterio would face WWE Tag Team Champions Cody Rhodes and Goldust in a non-title tag team match with Show and Mysterio emerging victorious.

Fandango would face Dolph Ziggler in a rematch with Ziggler winning due to a Roll-up.

This was the last pay-per-view event that the previous version of the World Heavyweight Championship was defended before its unification with the WWE Championship at the event. The Big Gold Belt, however, continued to be used in tandem with the WWE Championship belt to represent the WWE World Heavyweight Championship until the August 18, 2014, episode of Raw, when both belts were replaced by the original Network Logo belt. In April 2023, a new World Heavyweight Championship was created with a new lineage that does not follow the lineage of the original World Heavyweight Championship but is considered its successor.

This was the last TLC event to air exclusively via traditional PPV outlets due to the launch of the WWE Network streaming service in February 2014.

== Results ==
No.	Results	Stipulations	Times
1^{P}	Fandango (with Summer Rae) defeated Dolph Ziggler by pinfall	Singles match	4:21
2	CM Punk defeated The Shield (Dean Ambrose, Seth Rollins, and Roman Reigns) by pinfall	Handicap match	13:42
3	AJ Lee (c) (with Tamina Snuka) defeated Natalya by pinfall	Singles match for the WWE Divas Championship	6:35
4	Big E Langston (c) defeated Damien Sandow by pinfall	Singles match for the WWE Intercontinental Championship	6:28
5	Cody Rhodes and Goldust (c) defeated Big Show and Rey Mysterio, The Real Americans (Jack Swagger and Antonio Cesaro) (with Zeb Colter), and RybAxel (Ryback and Curtis Axel)	Fatal four-way tag team elimination match for the WWE Tag Team Championship	21:05
6	R-Truth (with Xavier Woods) defeated Brodus Clay (with Cameron, Naomi, and Tensai) by pinfall	Singles match	6:02
7	Kofi Kingston defeated The Miz by pinfall	No Disqualification match	8:02
8	The Wyatt Family (Bray Wyatt, Luke Harper, and Erick Rowan) defeated Daniel Bryan by pinfall	Handicap match	12:24
9	Randy Orton (WWE) defeated John Cena (World)	Tables, Ladders, and Chairs match to unify the WWE Championship and World Heavyweight Championship as the WWE World Heavyweight Championship	24:36
(c) / – the champion(s) heading into the match; P / – the match was broadcast on the pre-show

=== Fatal four-way tag team elimination match ===
Elimination	Wrestler	Team	Eliminated by	Elimination move	Times
1	Ryback	RybAxel	Goldust	Pinned with a roll-up	06:11
2	Antonio Cesaro	The Real Americans	Big Show	Pinned after a K.O. Punch	14:40
3	Rey Mysterio	Big Show and Rey Mysterio	Cody Rhodes	Pinned after a Cross Rhodes	21:05
Winners:	Cody Rhodes and Goldust (c)		—N/a		21:05
