= Cameron (wrestler) =

American professional wrestler (born 1987)

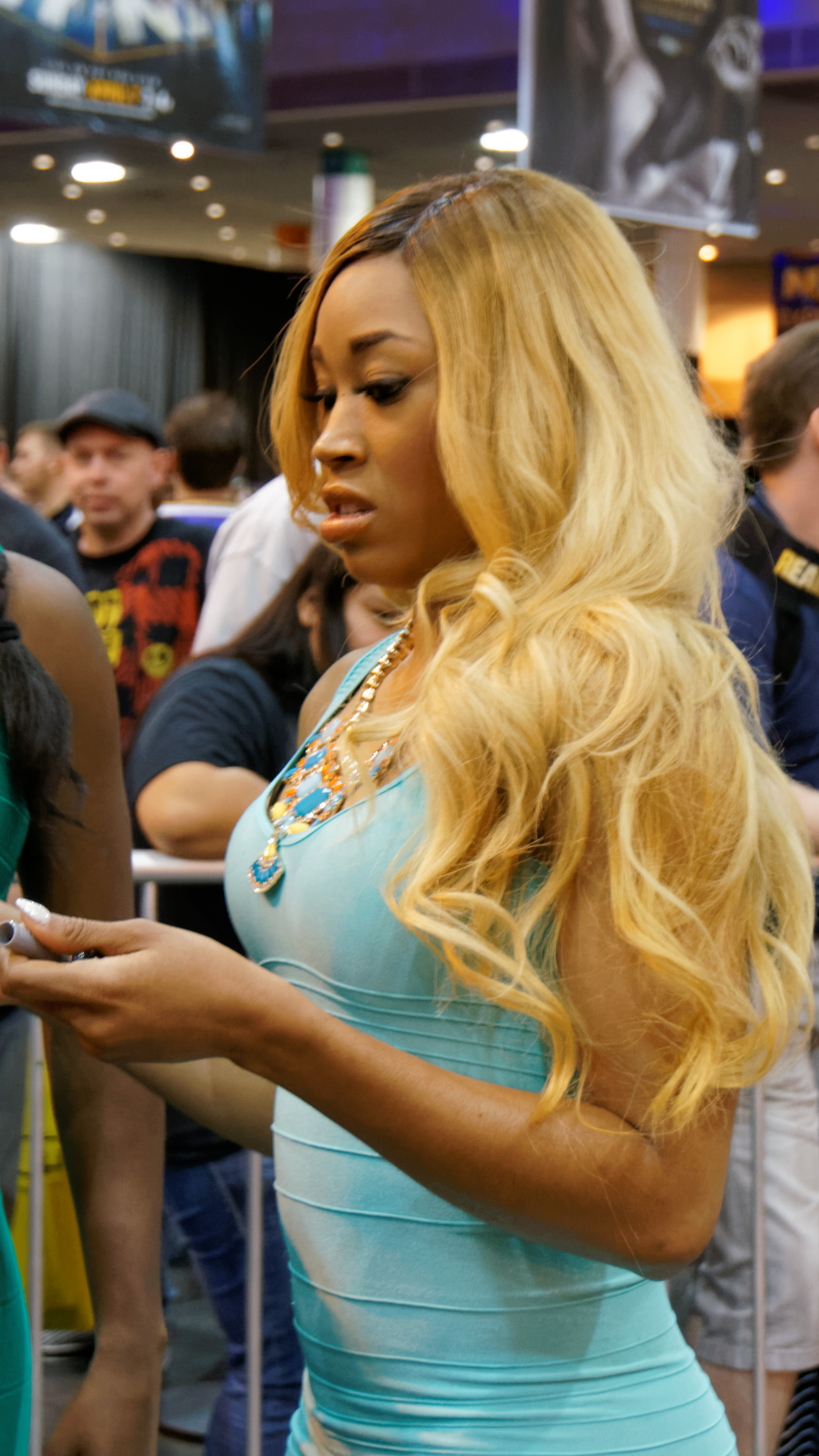
- Cameron in 2014

Personal information
- Born: Ariane Andrew; November 3, 1987 (age 38) Atlanta, Georgia, U.S.
- Website: arianeandrew.com

Professional wrestling career
- Ring name(s): Ariane Andrew; Cameron; Cameron Lynn
- Billed height: 5 ft 6 in (168 cm)
- Billed weight: 119 lb (54 kg)
- Billed from: Northridge, California; Orlando, Florida "Planet Funk"
- Trained by: Florida Championship Wrestling; Norman Smiley; Sara Del Rey
- Debut: July 7, 2011

Ariane Andrew (born November 3, 1987) is an American professional wrestler, singer, and dancer. She is best known for her tenure in WWE, where she performed under the ring name Cameron.

Andrew participated in the 2011 season of WWE Tough Enough, where she was the first competitor eliminated. She later signed with WWE and joined Naomi in forming The Funkadactyls. From July 2013 to March 2015, Andrew was one of the first cast members of the reality television show Total Divas.

== Early life ==
Ariane Andrew was born on November 3, 1987 . She is African American. She later graduated from California State University, Northridge with a Bachelor of Arts in business marketing and a Bachelor of Science in psychology. After graduating, she moved to North Hollywood, where she worked as a behavior therapist for autistic children.

== Professional wrestling career ==
=== World Wrestling Entertainment/WWE (2011–2016) ===
==== Tough Enough and Florida Championship Wrestling (2011–2012) ====
In 2011, Andrew competed in a non-televised Diva Search with World Wrestling Entertainment (WWE). Later that year, Andrew was one of fourteen contestants on the revival of Tough Enough, where she was the first eliminated. During her only appearance on the show, she was criticised for naming her favourite wrestling match of all time as being Melina vs. Alicia Fox.

Immediately after being eliminated from Tough Enough, Andrew confirmed on her Twitter account that WWE had signed her to a contract. She was then assigned to WWE's then-developmental territory, Florida Championship Wrestling (FCW), and made her debut on July 7, 2011, as a ring announcer at an FCW house show. On July 9, she made her in-ring debut, under the ring name Cameron Lynn, in a Divas battle royal, which consisted of Audrey Marie, Caylee Turner, Kaitlyn, Maxine, Raquel Diaz, Sonia, and Aksana, in which Lynn was eliminated first. On the October 9, 2011, episode of FCW TV, she made her televised debut with Byron Saxton, accompanying Naomi Knight to ringside during her match against Leah West, which Knight won. On the October 23 episode of FCW TV, Lynn teamed with Knight in a winning effort against Caylee Turner and Kaitlyn.

==== The Funkadactyls (2012–2014) ====
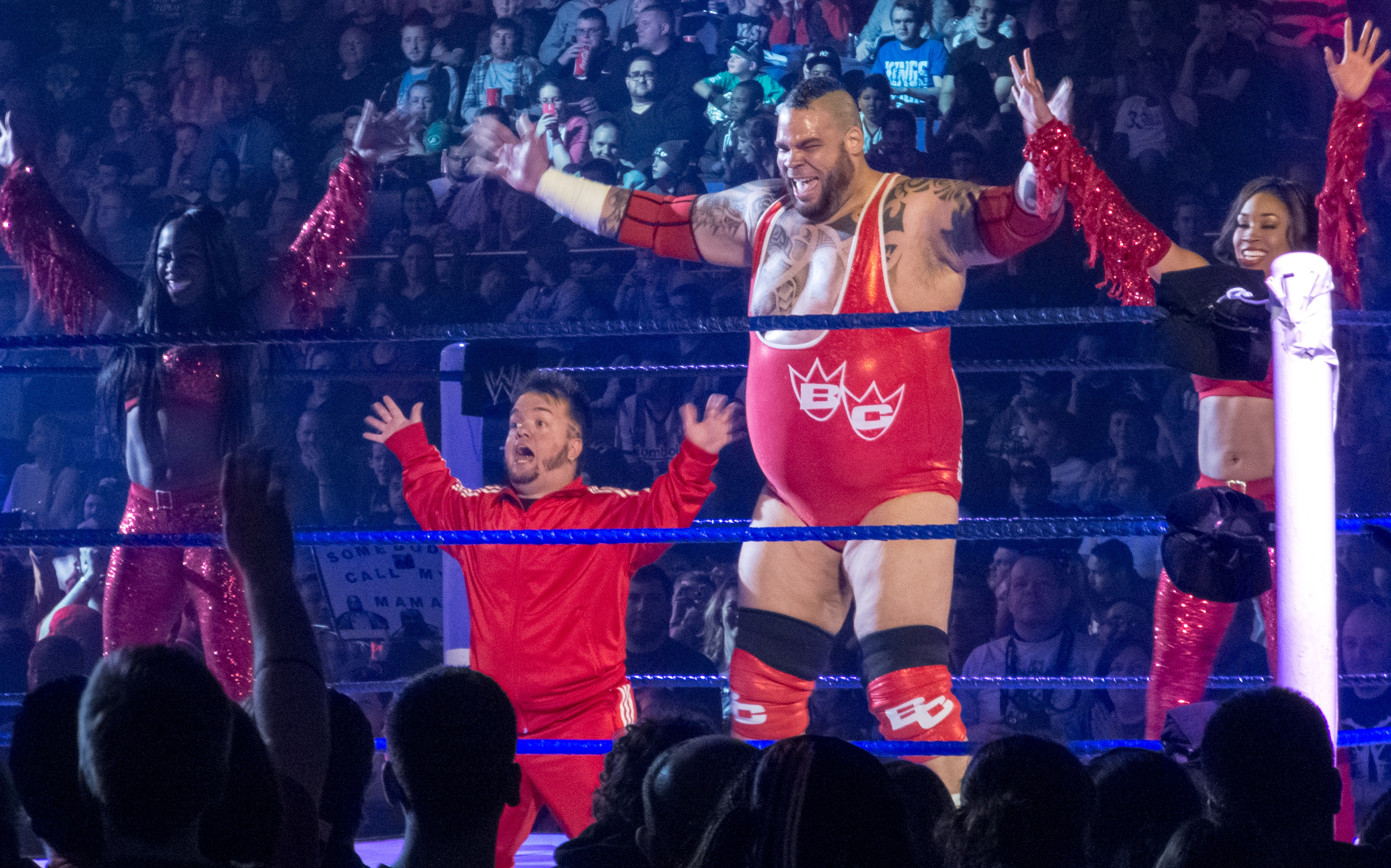
Cameron (right) at the ring along Brodus Clay, dance partner Naomi, and Hornswoggle (front) in April 2012

On the January 9, 2012 episode of Raw, she (billed simply as Cameron) made her WWE main roster debut as one of the dancers and valets, along with Naomi, for the returning Brodus Clay. She made her WrestleMania debut at WrestleMania XXVIII alongside Naomi in a segment with Clay. On the TLC: Tables, Ladders & Chairs pre-show on December 16, 2012, Cameron participated in her first televised match on the main roster, which was a "Santa's Little Helpers" battle royal which was won by her fellow Funkadactyl Naomi, who would go on to face Eve Torres later that night for the Divas Championship.

On the February 6, 2013 episode of Main Event, the Funkadactyls got into a backstage altercation with Tamina Snuka and Aksana, after Snuka and Aksana began to persuade Brodus Clay to fire the Funkadactyls and hire them as his backup dancers instead. This led to Cameron and Naomi's first match as a team, in which they defeated Snuka and Aksana.

On the March 15 episode of SmackDown, the Funkadactyls were attacked by the returning Bella Twins in a backstage segment. On the March 22 episode of SmackDown and March 25 episode of Raw, the Funkadactyls attacked the twins after they interfered both times in Tons of Funk (Brodus Clay and Tensai)'s match against Team Rhodes Scholars (Cody Rhodes and Damien Sandow). The four women eventually faced off in a tag team match on the March 27 episode of Main Event, where the Bella Twins emerged victorious when Nikki Bella pinned Naomi after an interference by Rhodes. Cameron and Naomi were set to team up with Brodus Clay and Tensai against Team Rhodes Scholars and the Bella Twins at WrestleMania 29 in an eight-person mixed tag team match, however the match was cancelled due to time restraints. The match instead took place the following night on Raw, where Tons of Funk and the Funkadactyls emerged victorious.

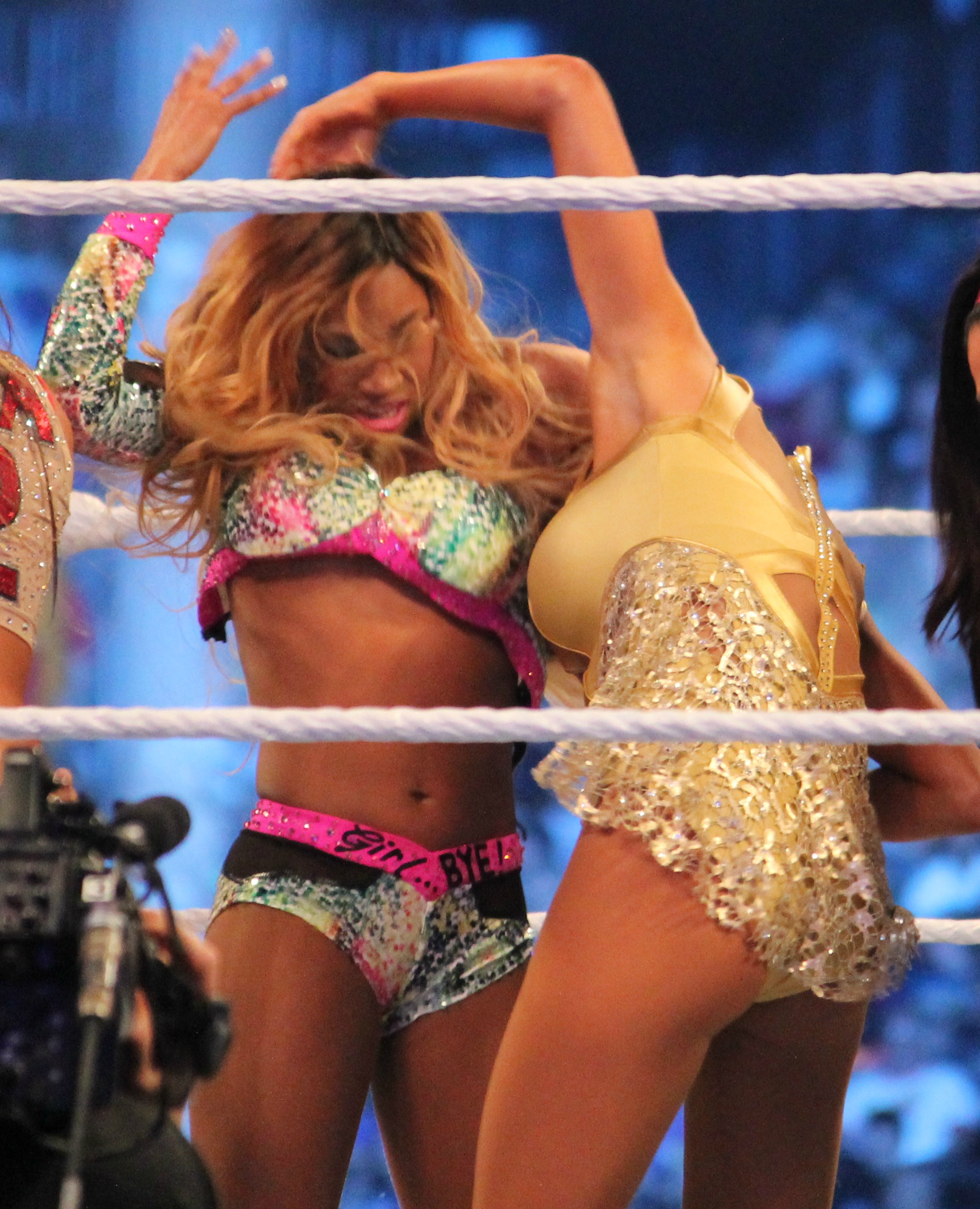
Cameron wrestling Rosa Mendes at the WrestleMania XXX event in April 2014

On the August 26 episode of Raw, Cameron and Naomi accompanied Natalya to an unsuccessful singles match against Brie Bella, until AJ Lee interrupted and ignited a feud on the cast of Total Divas, criticizing them as undeserving. On the September 27 episode of Smackdown!, Cameron was defeated by Lee in singles match. Cameron joined Team "Total Divas" in a 7-on-7 elimination tag-team match against Team "True Divas" (Alicia Fox, Aksana, AJ Lee, Kaitlyn, Rosa Mendes, Tamina Snuka, and Summer Rae) at the Survivor Series pay-per-view and the following night on Raw in a rematch; although Cameron was eliminated by Mendes in the former event and by Snuka in the latter, her team was ultimately victorious in both competitions. On December 15 at the TLC: Tables, Ladders & Chairs pay-per-view, Cameron, along with fellow Funkadactyl Naomi and Tensai, abandoned Brodus Clay because of his attitude, effectively disbanding Tons of Funk. The following night on an episode of Raw, Cameron and Naomi aligned themselves with R-Truth and Xavier Woods, and began accompanying them to their matches.

In January 2014, the Funkadactyls began feuding with AJ Lee and her bodyguard Tamina Snuka, when Naomi received a push and defeated Lee in various tag team matches on both Raw and SmackDown. However, their rivalry was cut shortly after Naomi suffered a legitimate eye injury during her match with Aksana on the February 3 episode of Raw. On the February 10 episode of Raw, Cameron pinned Aksana during a six-Diva tag team match, and on the February 19 episode of Main Event, Cameron defeated her in a singles match. On February 23 at Elimination Chamber, Cameron received her first shot at the Divas Championship, a match which she won by disqualification after Tamina Snuka accidentally hit a superkick on AJ Lee. Cameron received a rematch on the February 28 episode of SmackDown, which she would lose. At WrestleMania XXX, Cameron failed to capture the title in the "Vickie Guerrero Divas Championship Invitational" match, which was ultimately won by Lee.

==== Singles competition and departure (2014–2016) ====
In June 2014, after the Payback pay-per-view, Cameron started a brief feud with new Divas Champion Paige, in which Cameron would begin displaying signs of a villainous persona and would unsuccessfully challenge Paige in three non-title matches on Superstars and Raw, all of which Paige would win. Paige then lost to a non-title match to Cameron's tag team partner Naomi, who would get a shot at the Divas Championship at Money in the Bank, after which the Funkadactyls began to fall out and had several disagreements during and after their matches.

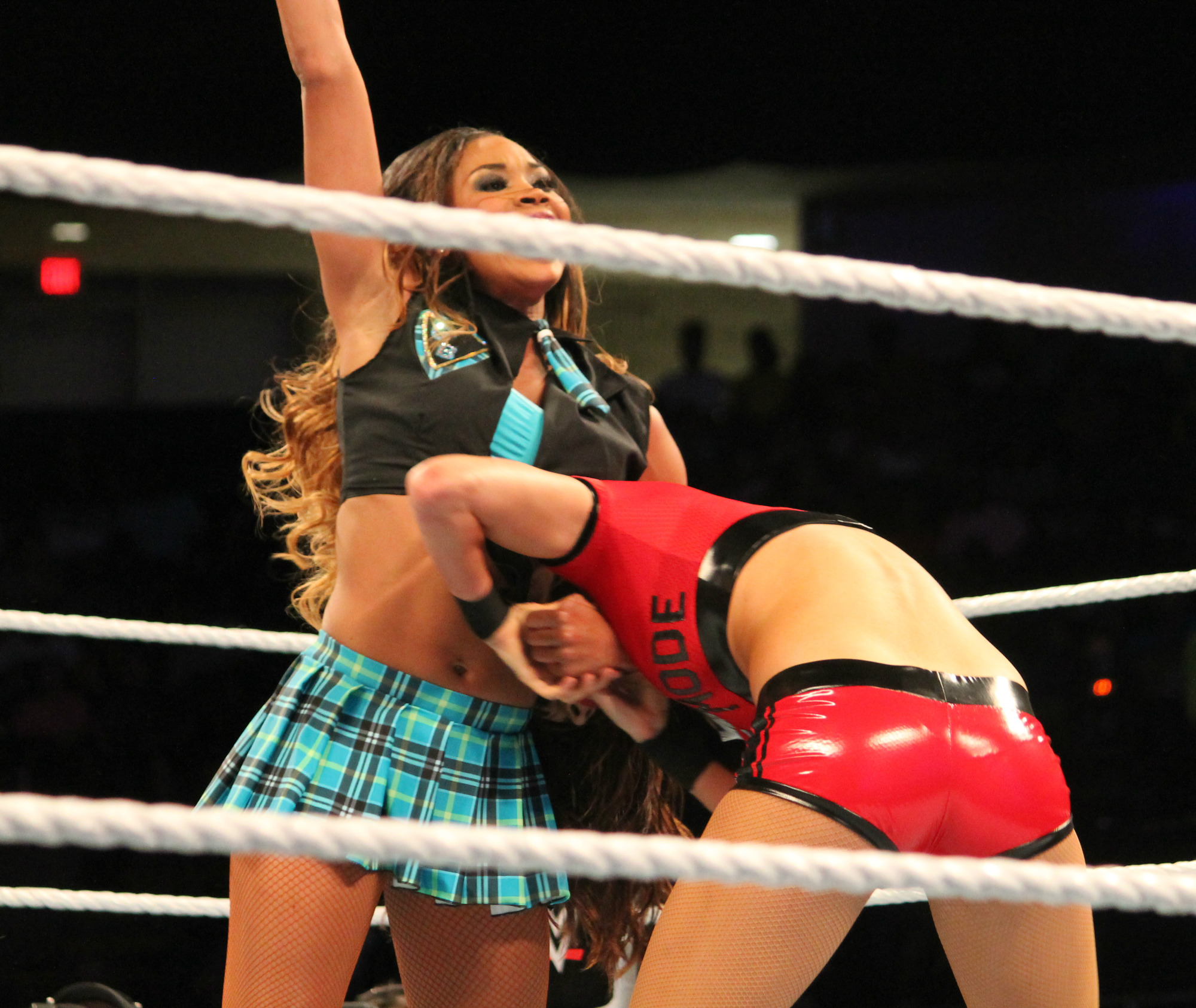
Cameron planning to perform her "Girl Bye!" DDT on Brie Bella.

On the July 7 episode of Raw, Cameron and Naomi were defeated by AJ Lee and Paige after Cameron tagged herself in and was pinned by Paige. After the match, Cameron and Naomi began brawling in and out of the ring, and as a result, Cameron cemented her heel turn and the team was disbanded. The following night on an episode of Main Event, Cameron was scheduled to team with Naomi, Natalya, Eva Marie, Rosa Mendes, and Summer Rae against Nikki Bella in a six-on-one handicap match, but only showed up to attack Naomi and Nikki. Cameron competed in her first match as a villain on the July 15 episode of Main Event losing to Emma and attacked her after the match, only to be scared off by Naomi. This led to a match between the two on the Battleground pre–show, where Cameron defeated Naomi after grabbing her tights. Throughout the summer, Cameron continued her rivalry with Naomi and competed in various handicap, singles and tag team matches. In November, at Survivor Series, Cameron participated in a four-on-four elimination tag team match, where she was eliminated by Naomi before her team ultimately lost the match. In early 2015, Cameron competed in various singles matches losing to the likes of Summer Rae, Naomi and Paige. On the April 13 episode of Raw, Cameron competed in a number one contender's battle royal for Nikki Bella's WWE Divas Championship, which would be won by Paige. After being the special guest referee for a match between Alicia Fox and Natalya, Cameron would attack both Divas on the April 9 episode of Smackdown, which would lead to a triple threat match the following week, with Cameron coming out victorious. A few weeks later, on the April 30 episode of SmackDown, Cameron confronted Nikki Bella during a backstage segment that led to a non–title match between the two, which Cameron lost.

After taking a hiatus from WWE television, Cameron was moved to WWE NXT and made her return on the November 4 episode of NXT, losing to Asuka. On the January 13, 2016, episode of NXT, Cameron competed in a battle royal to determine the number one contender for Bayley's NXT Women's Championship, which was won by Carmella. On the February 10 episode of NXT, Cameron faced Alexa Bliss in a losing effort. After nearly three months of inactivity, WWE announced on May 6 that Andrew had been released from her contract.

==== One-night appearance (2022) ====
Cameron made a one-night appearance on January 29, 2022, at the Royal Rumble event, entering the women's Royal Rumble match before being eliminated by Sonya Deville.

=== All Elite Wrestling (2020) ===
Andrew made her All Elite Wrestling debut on the July 29, 2020 episode of AEW Dynamite, as she was revealed to have chosen the same color token as Nyla Rose in the Deadly Draw lottery system, meaning the two would team for the AEW Women's Tag Team Cup Tournament. They were eliminated in the first round after losing to Anna Jay and Tay Conti.

== Other media ==
Ariane Andrew

YouTube information
- Channel: arianeandrew
- Years active: 2011–present
- Genre: Vlogging
- Subscribers: 13,800
- Views: 745,000
- Last updated: July 8, 2026
- Website: www.arianeandrew.com

Andrew played a main role for the reality television show Total Divas produced by WWE and E!, which began airing in July 2013. In May 2015, it was announced that Andrew would not be featured as a full-time cast member on the show for season 4, although she still appears as a guest star.

Cameron has appeared in four WWE video games. She made her in-game debut in WWE 13 as an NPC along with Naomi as the Funkadactyls appearing during Brodus Clay's entrance and winning celebration as well as in WWE 2K14, she later made her playable character debut in WWE 2K15 and was playable once again in WWE 2K16.

In September 2015, Andrew launched an anti-bullying campaign called "Wrong #".

Andrew competed on the MTV reality series The Challenge titled Champs vs. Stars.

== Filmography ==
=== Television ===
Year	Title	Role	Notes
2011	WWE Tough Enough	Herself	Contestant; 14th place (season 5)
2013–2015	Total Divas	Herself	Main cast (seasons 1–3); Recurring (season 4): 30 episodes
2017	The Challenge: Champs vs. Stars	Herself	
2023	Nikki Bella Says I Do	Herself	Episode: "Pole Dancing With the Stars"
2017-2018	Odd Man Out: The Series	Rhonda Burton	2 episodes
2018	My Girlfriend is Black	Cokea	4 episodes

=== Film ===
Year	Title	Role	Notes
2018	Blood Bath	Raine	Short film
2019	Jaded Pictures	Jada Anthony	Short film
2019	Underdog	Cecilia "CC" Collins	
2019	The Hook Up	Lily	
2022	Strawberry Princess	Layla Johnson	
2024	The Legend of Catclaws Mountain	Riley Wilson	
2025	Onyx	Shannon	
2025	A Demon’s Revenge	Starr	

== Discography ==
Ariane
- Born: Ariane Andrew
- Genres: Pop, dance, electropop, R&B
- Years active: 2013–present
- Website: www.arianeandrew.com

=== Singles ===
Year	Single	Album
2014	"Bye Bye (feat. Ice)"	non-album singles
2015	"Wrong Number (feat. Lovely)"	non-album singles
2021	"Born With It"	non-album singles

== Personal life ==
Cameron has previously lived in Tampa, Florida. Cameron was in a relationship with Vincent Isayan, and their relationship was featured on Total Divas. On the May 24, 2016 episode of Stone Cold Steve Austin's podcast, Cameron revealed that she and Isayan had broken up. She has a younger brother, Quentinn, and a younger sister, Aniyah. She has two degrees. She cites Maryse, Melina, and Alicia Fox as her inspirations.

In August 2012, Cameron was arrested for allegedly driving under the influence and trying to bribe the arresting officer which turned out to be false, and on season 2 of Total Divas she said and discussed the incident was a false accusation from stereotyping and racial profiling. She was found not guilty. Cameron received a two-week suspension from the WWE for the incident.

== Championship and accomplishments ==
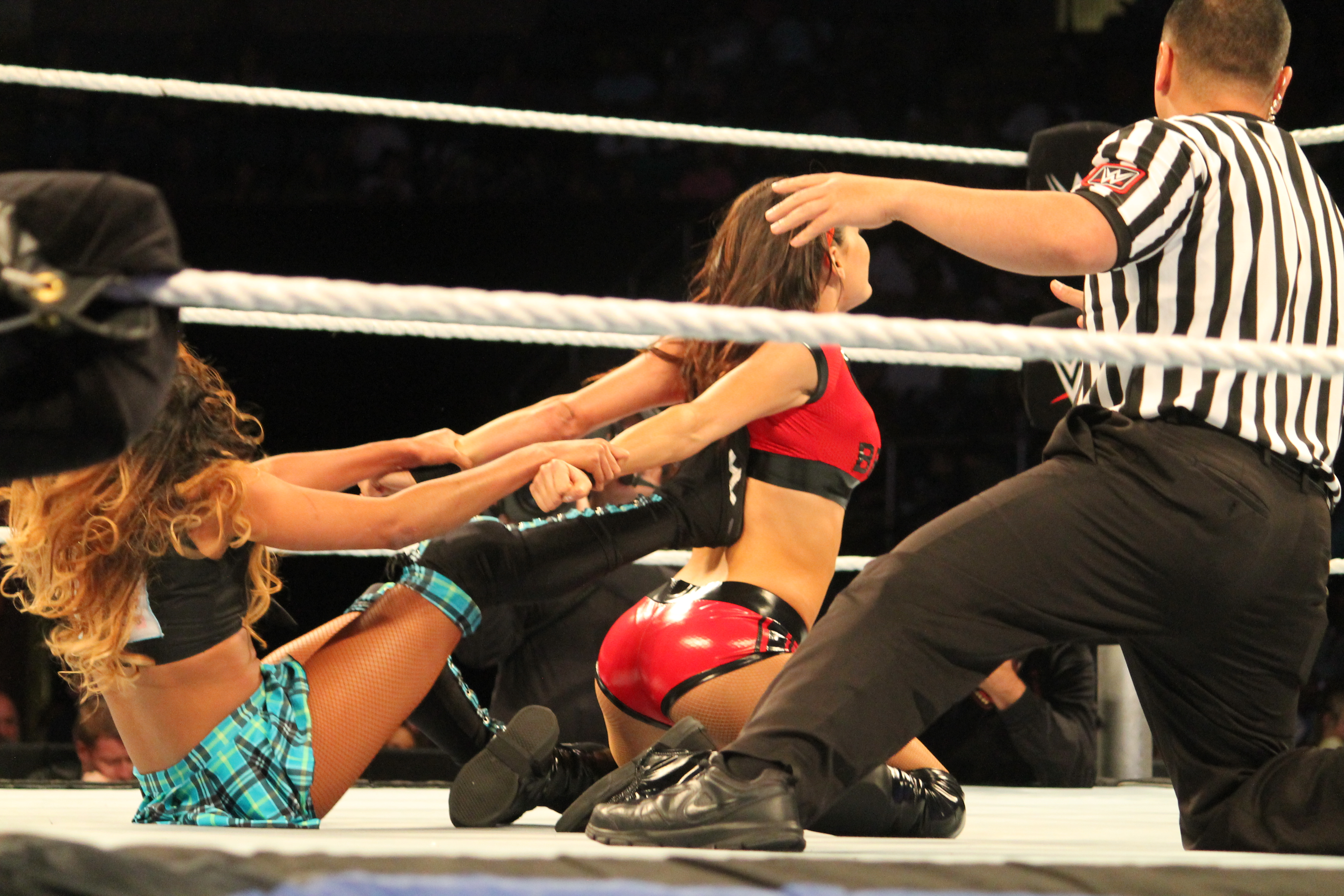
Cameron (left) performing a modified surfboard stretch on Brie Bella

- America World Wrestling
  - AWW Women's World Championship (1 time)
- Pro Wrestling Illustrated
  - Ranked No. 17 of the top 50 female wrestlers in the PWI Female 50 in 2014
- Wrestling Observer Newsletter
  - Worst Worked Match of the Year (2013) with Brie Bella, Eva Marie, JoJo, Naomi, Natalya, and Nikki Bella vs. AJ Lee, Aksana, Alicia Fox, Kaitlyn, Rosa Mendes, Summer Rae, and Tamina Snuka on November 24
- WWE
  - Slammy Award (1 time)
    - Best Dance Moves of the Year (2013) – with Naomi as the Funkadactyls
