= Total Divas season 8 =

Season of American television series Total Divas

Total Divas
- Season 8
- Starring: Brie Bella; Naomi; Natalya; Nikki Bella; Paige; Lana; Nia Jax
- No. of episodes: 10

Release
- Original network: E!
- Original release: September 19 – November 28, 2018

Season chronology
- ← Previous; Season 7 Next → Season 9

Total Divas is an American reality television series that premiered on July 28, 2013, on E!. The series gave viewers an inside look at the lives of WWE Divas from their work within WWE to their personal lives. Season 7 ended on January 31, 2018 with 665 thousand viewers.

== Production ==
On April 4, 2018, speculations arose about the upcoming eighth season of Total Divas, as reports stated that E! cameras had been filming a handful of WWE female wrestlers in New Orleans during the WrestleMania weekend. Paige, who was a part of the main cast from seasons 3 to 6, was also seen being followed by E! cameras, speculating her possible return to the series. On April 13, it was confirmed that Paige would be returning to the series for the eighth season. With these reports, the status of the remaining cast members are left unknown. On May 15, 2018, it was announced that Carmella would not be returning for the show's eighth season. On May 25, Paige and Nia Jax posted a video together using a hash tag indicating they were filming for the show, confirming Nia Jax as a cast member for the upcoming season. On May 31, it was reported that Brie and Nikki Bella were seen filming an episode of the upcoming season with cast members Lana, Natalya, and Paige, confirming their involvement with the eighth season.

On May 7, 2018, E! and WWE announced that Total Divas had been renewed for seasons 8 and 9. Season 8 is expected to air in fall 2018.

On July 26, 2018, it was announced that season 8 would premiere on September 19, 2018, and the cast for the season was confirmed to be Brie and Nikki Bella, Naomi, Natalya, Lana, Nia Jax, and Paige.

== Cast ==
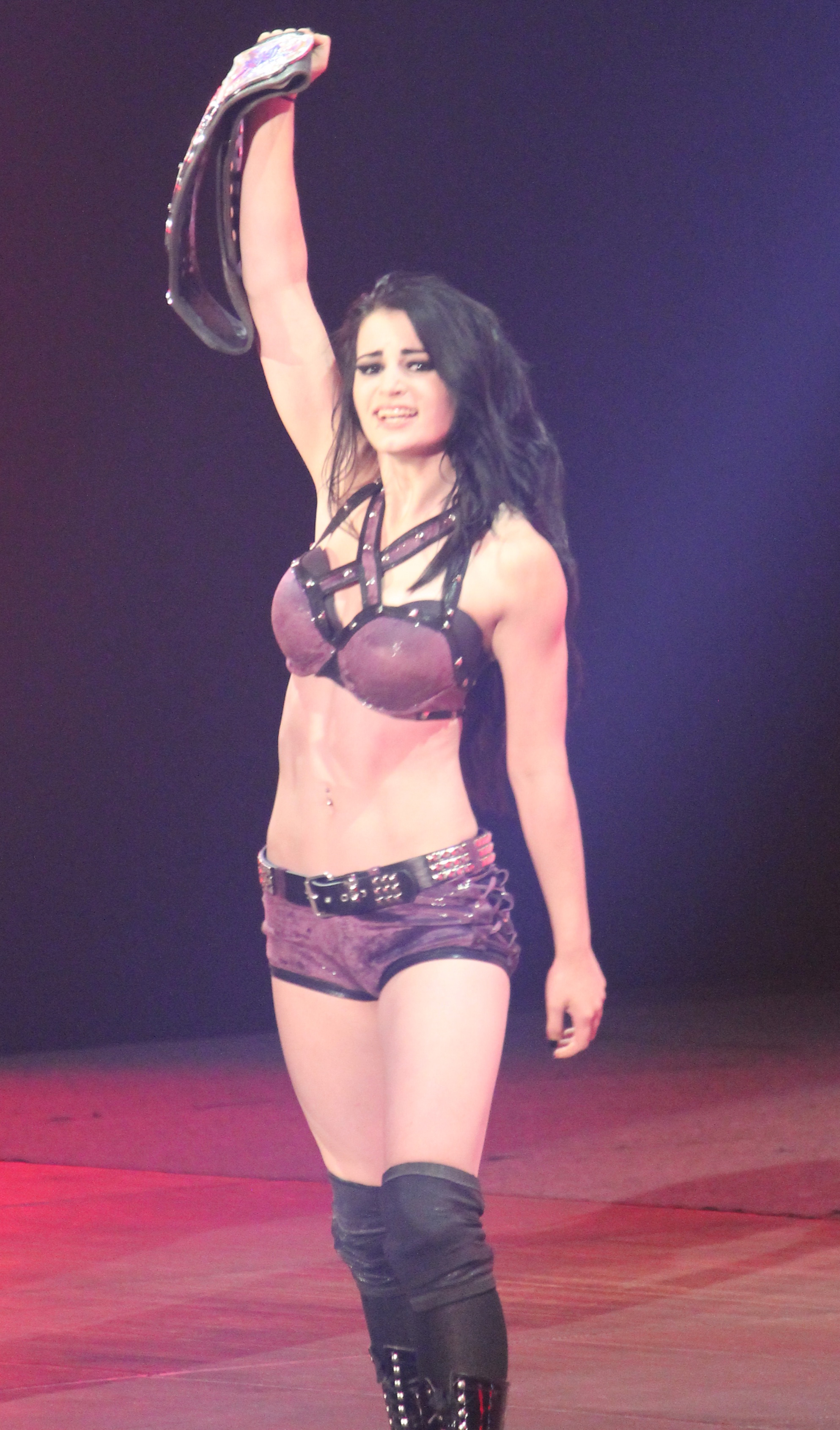
Paige; who rejoined the main cast in season 8.

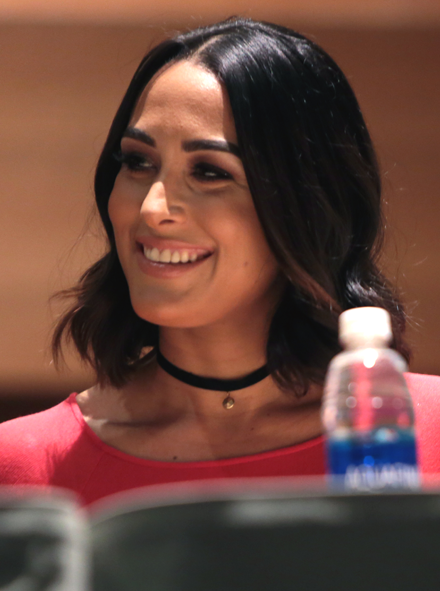
Brie in 2016.

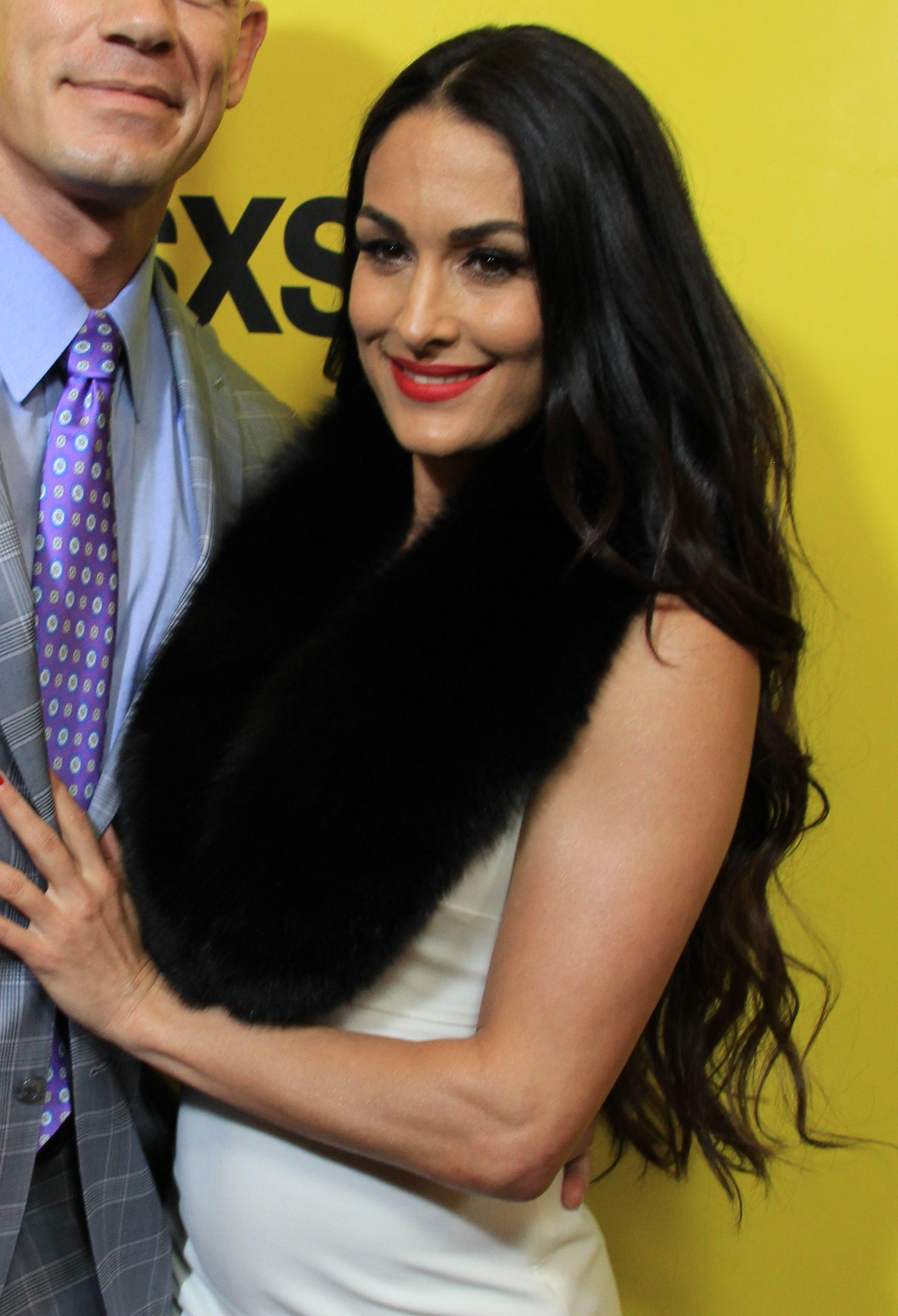
Nikki in 2018.

=== Main cast ===
- Brie Bella (Brianna Danielson)
- Naomi (Trinity Fatu)
- Natalya (Natalie Neidhart-Wilson)
- Nikki Bella (Stephanie Nicole Garcia-Colace)
- Paige (Saraya-Jade Bevis)
- Lana (Catherine Perry)
- Nia Jax (Savelina Fanene)

=== Recurring cast ===
- Daniel Bryan (Brie's husband)
- Jimmy Uso (Naomi's husband)
- Tyson Kidd (Natalya's husband)
- Rusev (Lana's husband)
- Jim Neidhart (Nattie's father)
- Ellie Neidhart (Nattie's mother)

=== Guest stars ===
- Alexa Bliss (Alexis Kaufman)
- Alicia Fox (Victoria Crawford)
- Carmella (Leah Van Dale)
- JoJo (Joseann Offerman)
- Mandy Rose (Amanda Rose Saccomanno)
- Renee Young (Renee Paquette)
- Ember Moon (Adrienne Reese)
- Mark Carrano (WWE Senior Director of Talent Relations)
- The Miz (Michael Mizanin)
- Ronda Rousey (WWE wrestler)
- Sonya Deville (Daria Berenato)
- Tamina (Sarona Snuka-Polamalu)
- Kathy Colace (Brie & Nikki's mother)
- J.J. Garcia (Brie & Nikki's brother)

== Episodes ==
| No. overall | No. in season | Title | Original release date | Prod. code | U.S. viewers (millions) |
|---|---|---|---|---|---|
| 101 | 1 | "Good Girls Don't Make History" | September 19, 2018 | 801 | 0.45 |
As WrestleMania 34 approaches, tensions run high as the pressure comes down to the women's division; Nia comes to terms with how much is riding on her upcoming singles match; Brie entrusts Nattie with her Birdiebee products, and Paige has a hard time dealing with her recent injury that ended her wrestling career.
| 102 | 2 | "This Is My House" | September 26, 2018 | 802 | 0.39 |
Nia prepares herself emotionally for the biggest match of her career; Nattie feels unappreciated by her husband TJ; Brie and Nicole fulfill promises that shouldn't have been made in the first place, and Paige addresses the WWE Universe about her retirement, leaving her legacy in the ring.
| 103 | 3 | "The Real Nicole" "Risky Behavior" | October 3, 2018 | 803 | 0.36 |
Lana creates a stir with WWE as she attempts to gain some paparazzi in L.A. buzz for her upcoming film; Jon tries to change Trinity's bad eating habits, and Nattie finds out she's in the main event on Raw, while trying to squash the ridicule from her wardrobe malfunction at WrestleMania.
| 104 | 4 | "Paige's Secret" | October 10, 2018 | 804 | 0.38 |
Brie comes to terms with the fact that she can't breastfeed her child anymore; Nattie tries to prove to TJ that she can be a good hostess by throwing a last minute barbecue, which is almost ruined by her on-again off-again friend Lana, and Paige keeps a secret from Nia.
| 105 | 5 | "Pink Hair Don't Care" | October 17, 2018 | 805 | 0.34 |
Paige embraces her new role as the General Manager of SmackDown Live, and turns to Brie and Nicole for advice; Nia invites the ladies over to her new home which doesn't go quite as planned, and Lana makes a drastic change to cope with the fact that she isn't on WWE television.
| 106 | 6 | "Welcome to Miami" | October 24, 2018 | 806 | 0.39 |
The ladies head off to Miami for a few days of partying; Nattie and Nia celebrate their birthdays; Lana gets pranked; Paige organizes a frisky surprise; Nicole spices things up for the paparazzi, while Brie scrambles to find a great surprise at the last minute.
| 107 | 7 | "Chase Your Dreams" | October 31, 2018 | 807 | 0.38 |
Paige and Nia have a friendly competition on who can last the longest in regular jobs; Lana asks Bryan for advice on her upcoming ladder match, while Rusev was fixated on Birdie, making him yearn to be a father.
| 108 | 8 | "Hate Is a Strong Word" | November 7, 2018 | 808 | 0.38 |
Tension runs high in Lake Tahoe when a prank goes too far and an exchange of truthful words between Lana and Paige puts their friendship into perspective; Brie and Nicole reminisce on their childhood, and Trinity decides she wants to buy a place in Atlanta for her and Jon to use as a getaway.
| 109 | 9 | "A Sisterhood Beyond Blood" | November 14, 2018 | 809 | 0.41 |
Trinity and Jon still don't see eye-to-eye about buying a house in Atlanta, and the ladies spend their last days in Lake Tahoe conquering their fears and celebrating being strong, independent women.
| 110 | 10 | "Unbreakable Force" | November 28, 2018 | 810 | 0.41 |
As the historic Money in the Bank pay-per-view approaches, Lana is determined to show the WWE Universe what she is made; Nia prepares for the biggest match of her career; Brie and Nicole are eager to get back in the ring; Trinity and Jon continue to argue, and Nattie deals with some heartbreaking family matters.

== Ratings ==
| No. | Title | Original Air date | Viewership (millions) (Live+SD) | Rating/share (18–49) (Live+SD) | Rank per week on Cable |
|---|---|---|---|---|---|
| 1 | "Good Girls Don't Make History" | September 19, 2018 | 0.45 | TBD | #37 |
| 2 | "This Is My House" | September 26, 2018 | 0.39 | TBD | #56 |
| 3 | "The Real Nicole" "Risky Behavior" | October 3, 2018 | 0.36 | TBD | #63 |
| 4 | "Paige's Secret" | October 10, 2018 | 0.38 | TBD | #54 |
| 5 | "Pink Hair Don't Care" | October 17, 2018 | 0.34 | TBD | #50 |
| 6 | "Welcome to Miami" | October 24, 2018 | 0.39 | TBD | #49 |
| 7 | "Chase Your Dreams" | October 31, 2018 | 0.38 | TBD | #40 |
| 8 | "Hate Is a Strong Word" | November 7, 2018 | 0.38 | TBD | #79 |
| 9 | "A Sisterhood Beyond Blood" | November 14, 2018 | 0.41 | TBD | #39 |
| 10 | "Unbreakable Force" | November 28, 2018 | 0.41 | TBD | #45 |
