= Total Divas season 5 =

Season of American television series Total Divas

Total Divas
- Season 5
- Starring: Brie Bella; Eva Marie; Natalya; Nikki Bella; Rosa Mendes; Alicia Fox; Paige; Mandy Rose
- No. of episodes: 14

Release
- Original network: E!
- Original release: January 19 – April 19, 2016

Season chronology
- ← Previous; Season 4 Next → Season 6

Total Divas is an American reality television series that premiered on July 28, 2013, on E!. The series gave viewers an inside look of the lives of WWE Divas from their work within WWE to their personal lives. Behind the scene footage of the Divas is also included. Season 4 ended on September 29, 2015 with 1.15 million viewers. Season 4 also drew a cable ranking of No. 5.

== Production ==
On September 5, 2015, an online article states that there could be a strong possibility Total Divas will be renewed for a fifth season. It reads that season four will "wrap up this fall" and the new season "won't air till 2016 some time". On September 9, 2015, Naomi revealed on Twitter that she had been taken off the main cast after the mid-season finale, which is expected to air on September 29. Season four may be extended following the mid-season hiatus instead of jumping to season five. There has been speculation that WWE Tough Enough runner-up Amanda Saccomanno may join the cast after the mid-season hiatus. It was later confirmed that Amanda will be joining the cast. After the September 22 episode of Total Divas aired, it was announced that the following weeks episode would serve as the season finale, rather than a mid-season finale.

Season 5 was announced on October 6, 2015, which started airing in January 2016 with a majority of last season's cast returning. Naomi was officially removed from the main cast with Mandy taking her place and Rosa Mendes returning as a series regular.

== Cast ==
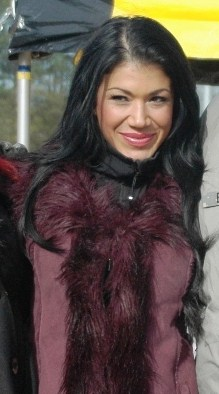
Rosa Mendes; who rejoined the main cast in season 5.

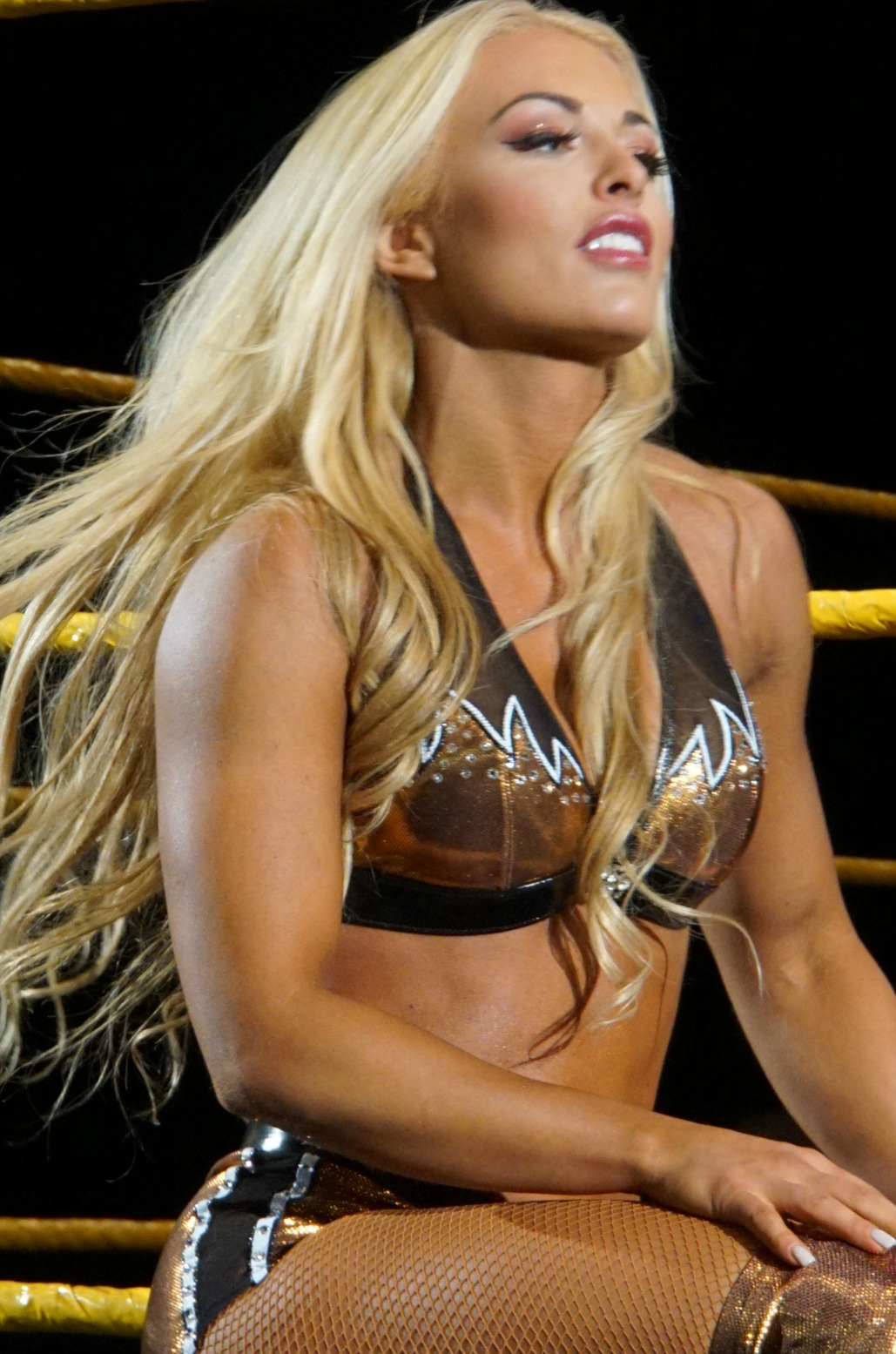
Mandy Rose; who joined the cast of Total Divas in season 5.

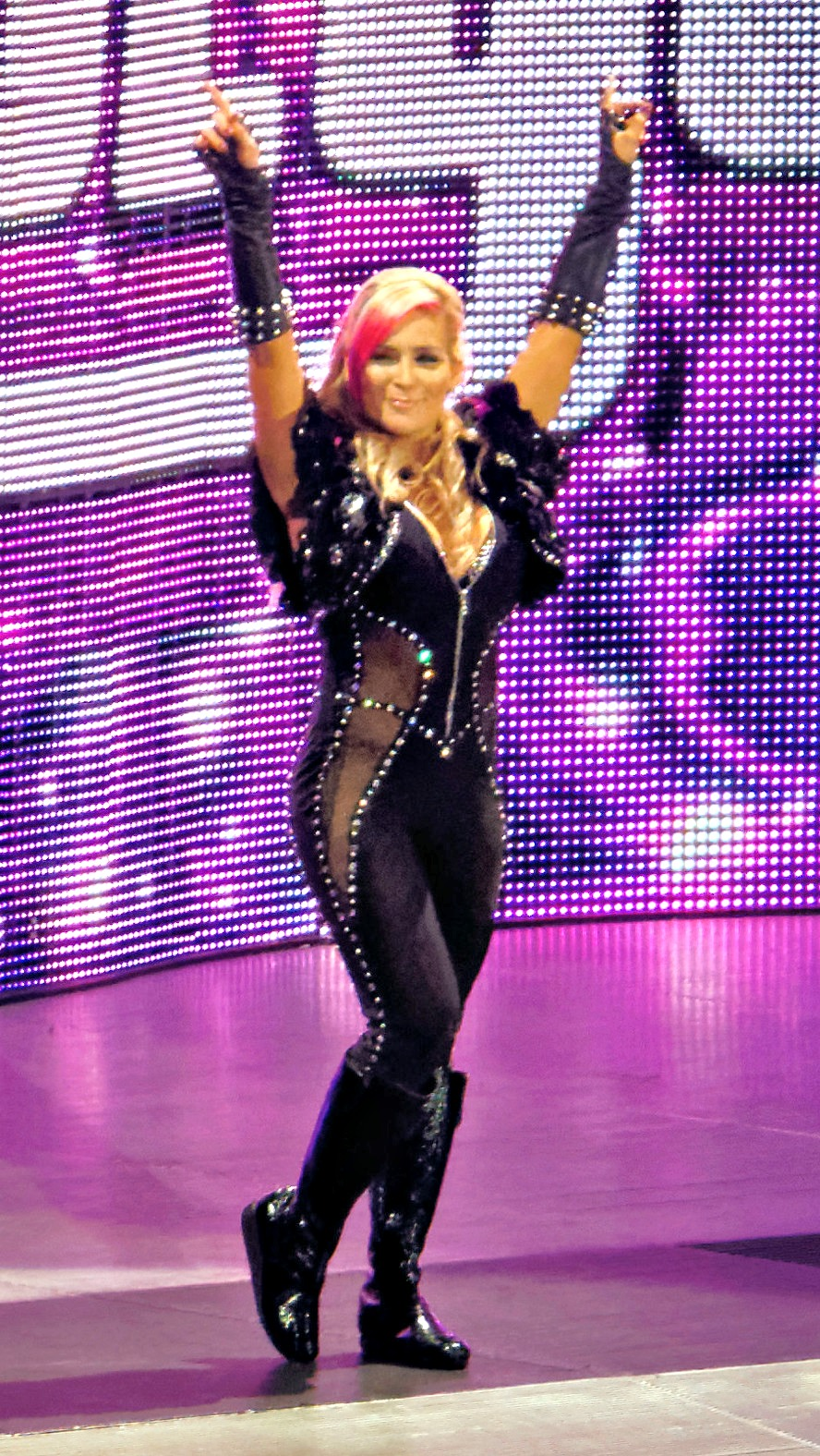
Nattie in March 2015.

=== Main cast ===
- Brie Bella (Brianna Danielson)
- Eva Marie (Natalie Marie Coyle)
- Natalya (Natalie Neidhart-Wilson)
- Nikki Bella (Stephanie Garcia-Colace)
- Rosa Mendes (Milena Roucka)
- Alicia Fox (Victoria Crawford)
- Paige (Saraya-Jade Bevis)
- Mandy Rose (Amanda Rose Saccomanno)

=== Recurring cast ===
- Summer Rae (Danielle Moinet)
- Daniel Bryan (Brie's husband)
- Tyson Kidd (Natalya's husband)
- John Cena (Nikki's fiancé)
- Mark Carrano (WWE Senior Director of Talent Relations)
- Kathy Colace (Brie & Nikki's mother)
- Ellie Neidhart (Nattie's mother)
- Jim Neidhart (Nattie's father)
- Renee Young (Renee Paquette)
- Dolph Ziggler (Nicholas "Nick" Nemeth)
- Kevin Skaff (Paige's ex-boyfriend)
- Bobby Schubenski (Rosa's fiancé)

=== Guest stars ===
- JoJo (Joseann Offerman)
- Naomi (Trinity Fatu)
- Jimmy Uso (Naomi's husband)
- Jonathan Coyle (Eva Marie's husband)
- Dean Ambrose (Jonathan "Jon" Good)
- Emma (Tenille Dashwood)
- Lilian Garcia (WWE Ring Announcer)
- J.J. Garcia (Brie & Nikki's brother)
- Jenni Neidhart (Nattie's sister)

== Episodes ==
No. overall	No. in season	Title	Original release date	Prod. code	U.S. viewers (millions)
59	1	"Love Triangle"	January 20, 2016	501	1.12
Nikki is undecided about telling John about something, meanwhile, Paige thinks about calling off her wedding. Brie thinks about Bryan's career.
60	2	"A SummerSlam Engagement"	January 27, 2016	502	0.94
Nattie's fears come true. Alicia feels disparaged by Paige, meanwhile, John has a surprise for Nikki.
61	3	"The Truth About Cats and Divas"	February 3, 2016	503	0.84
With Eva returning, Nattie surprises TJ, meanwhile, the twins have a confrontation about endorsements.
62	4	"Talk of The Town"	February 10, 2016	504	0.81
While Nikki aims to be like Maria Shriver, Brie mimics her. Alicia finds unhappy news, meanwhile, Mandy thinks about what she has done with her life.
63	5	"Come Reign or Shine"	February 17, 2016	505	0.80
Brie confronts Nikki, meanwhile, Alicia and Rosa argue. Nattie interrogates Mandy.
64	6	"End of a Friendship?"	February 24, 2016	506	0.77
Brie and Nikki have another confrontation. Rosa accentuates over her mother and her boyfriend, meanwhile, Alicia thinks about her friendship with Paige.
65	7	"Hart of the Matter"	March 2, 2016	507	0.59
Nikki puts the WWE Divas Championship on the line, meanwhile, Nattie is torn up about if she should keep her last name. Paige tries to keep her relationship with Kevin Skaff,^{1} guitarist from A Day to Remember, and Brie has words with Bryan about romance.
66	8	"Peace of Cake"	March 9, 2016	508	0.58
While Paige lies, Nikki has fears about Brie. Rosa attacks, Bobby, her boyfriend, thinking he has shamed her.
67	9	"Rocky Road to Recovery"	March 16, 2016	509	0.65
When Bobby goes to Las Vegas, Rosa thinks the worst, Nikki asks John to help her recover, and Nattie wants to take a family picture.
68	10	"No Retreat"	March 23, 2016	510	0.66
While Brie is divided about her friends and Bryan, Paige was going to help a fan come out, but thinks better of it, meanwhile, Eva and Mandy are tag team partners.
69	11	"Clothes Quarters"	March 30, 2016	511	0.56
While Mandy wants her parents to reconnect, Brie has inflexibility about the twins lingerie line. Nattie becomes embarrassed.
70	12	"Baby Talk"	April 6, 2016	512	0.64
While Alicia wants to fix her family, Paige is apparitional about her past as Rosa's baby shower is upcoming, meanwhile, Nikki tries to prove herself.
71	13	"C'est La Divas (Part 1)"	April 13, 2016	513	0.63
Nikki along with Nattie sees her physical therapist and does cryotherapy.
72	14	"C'est La Divas (Part 2)"	April 20, 2016	514	0.62
The divas are in Paris and Nikki gets news. Alicia and Rosa work on their friendship.

== Ratings ==
No.	Title	Original Air date	Viewership (millions) (Live+SD)	Rating/share (18–49) (Live+SD)	Rank per week on Cable
1	"Love Triangle"	January 19, 2016	1.12	0.53/4	#9
2	"A SummerSlam Engagement"	January 26, 2016	0.94	0.42/4.5	#18
3	"The Truth About Cats and Divas	February 2, 2016	0.84	0.40/4.76	#18
4	"Talk of The Town"	February 9, 2016	0.81	0.40/4.94	#21
5	"Come Reign or Shine"	February 16, 2016	0.80	0.40/4.95	#21
6	"End of a Friendship?"	February 23, 2016	0.77	0.40/5.15	#21
7	"Hart of the Matter"	March 1, 2016	0.59	0.30/5.08	#39
8	"Peace of Cake"	March 8, 2016	0.58	N/A	#50
9	"Rocky Road to Recovery"	March 15, 2016	0.65	0.30/4.62	#40
10	"No Retreat"	March 22, 2016	0.66	0.30/4.52	#33
11	"Clothes Quarters"	March 29, 2016	0.56	N/A	#34
12	"Baby Talk"	April 5, 2016	0.64	0.30/4.62	#28
13	"C'est La Divas (Part 1)"	April 12, 2016	0.63	0.18/2.9	#28
14	"C'est La Divas (Part 2)"	April 19, 2016	0.62	0.30/4.8	#31
