= Total Divas season 6 =

Season of American television series Total Divas

Total Divas
- Season 6
- Starring: Brie Bella; Eva Marie; Naomi; Natalya; Nikki Bella; Paige; Lana; Maryse; Renee Young
- No. of episodes: 16

Release
- Original network: E!
- Original release: November 16, 2016 – May 10, 2017

Season chronology
- ← Previous; Season 5 Next → Season 7

Total Divas is an American reality television series that premiered on July 28, 2013, on E!. The series gave viewers an inside look of the lives of WWE Divas from their work within WWE to their personal lives. Behind the scene footage of the Divas is also included. Season 5 ended on April 19, 2016 with 625 thousand viewers.

== Production ==
Season 6 was officially confirmed on April 18, 2016, by the E! Network with a fall premiere date and the majority of last season's cast returning, along with Naomi returning as a series regular and Renee Young, Lana, and Maryse replacing Rosa Mendes, Alicia Fox, and Mandy Rose.

On July 7, TJ, Nattie's husband, confirmed via Twitter that he would not be appearing on the upcoming season of Total Divas.

== Cast ==
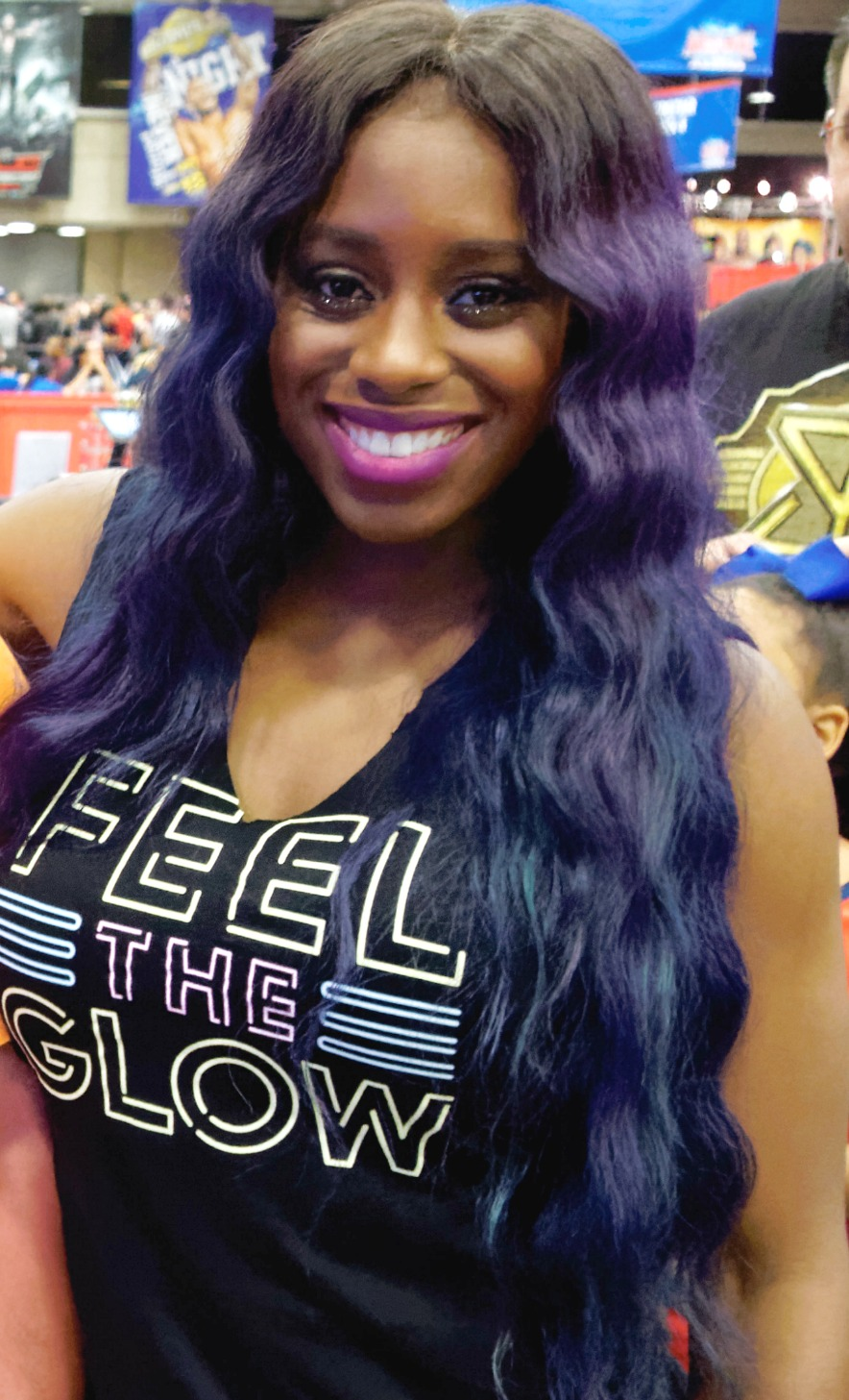
Naomi; who rejoined the main cast in season 6.

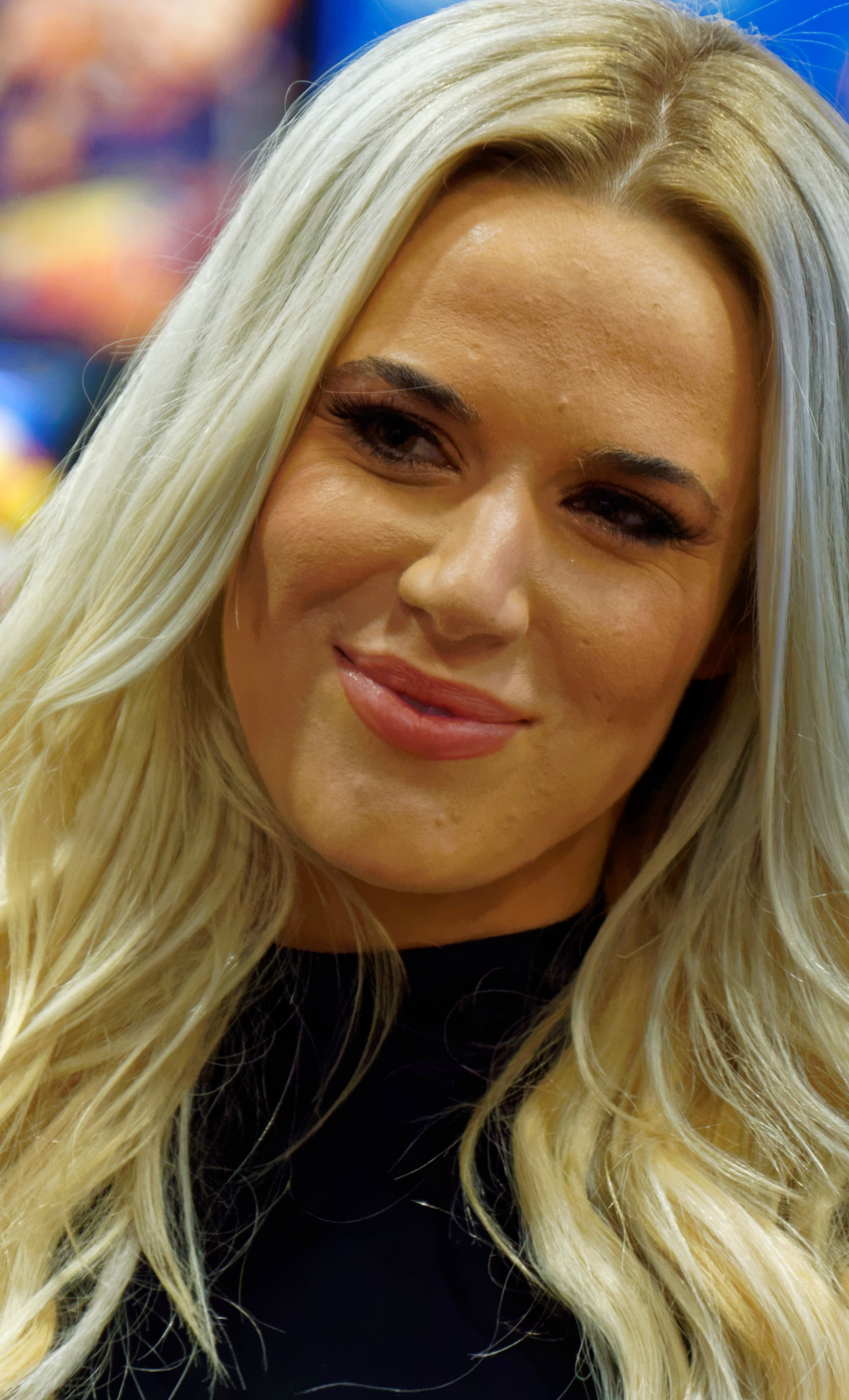
Lana; who joined the cast of Total Divas in season 6.

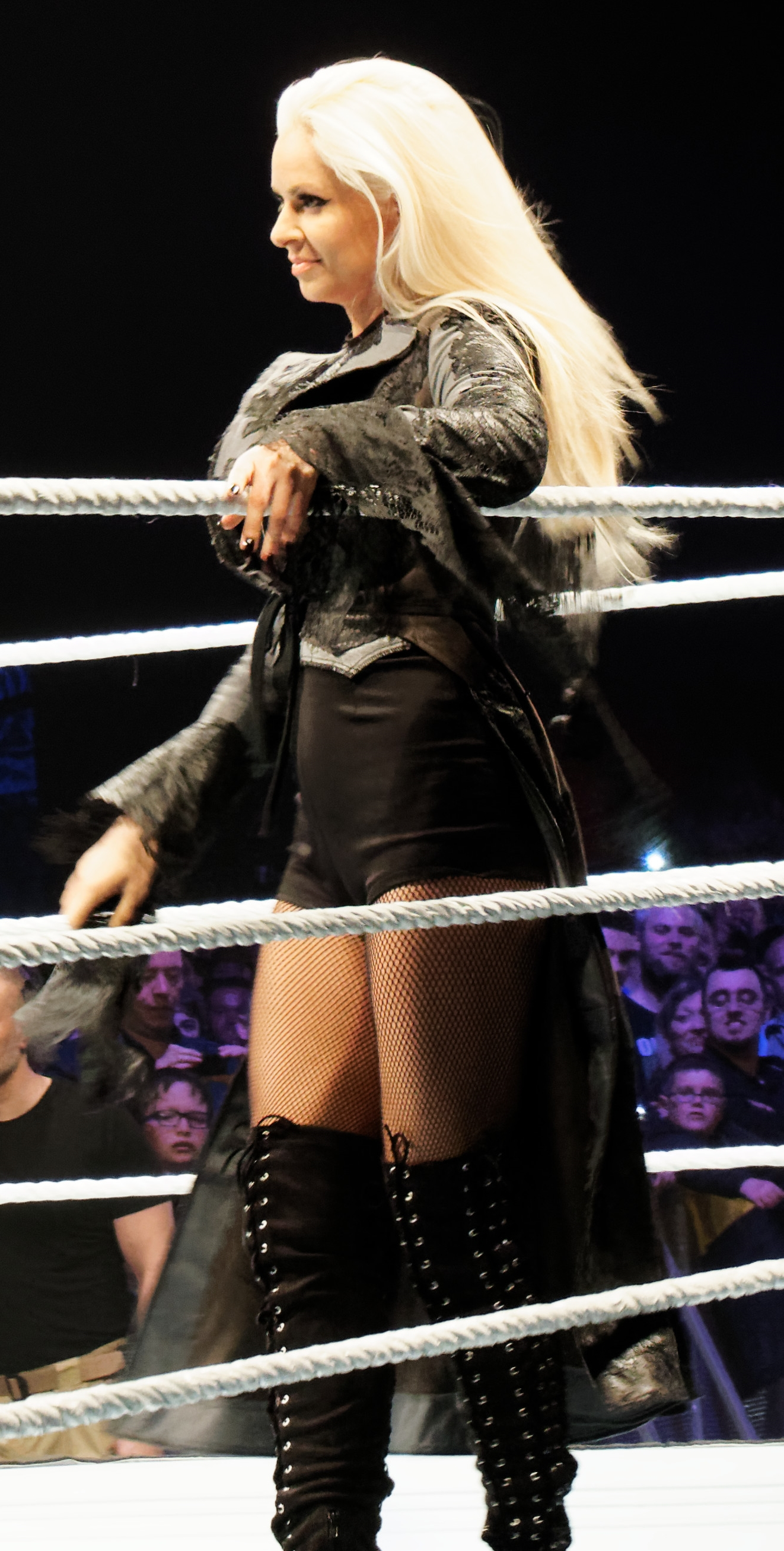
Maryse; who joined the cast of Total Divas in season 6.

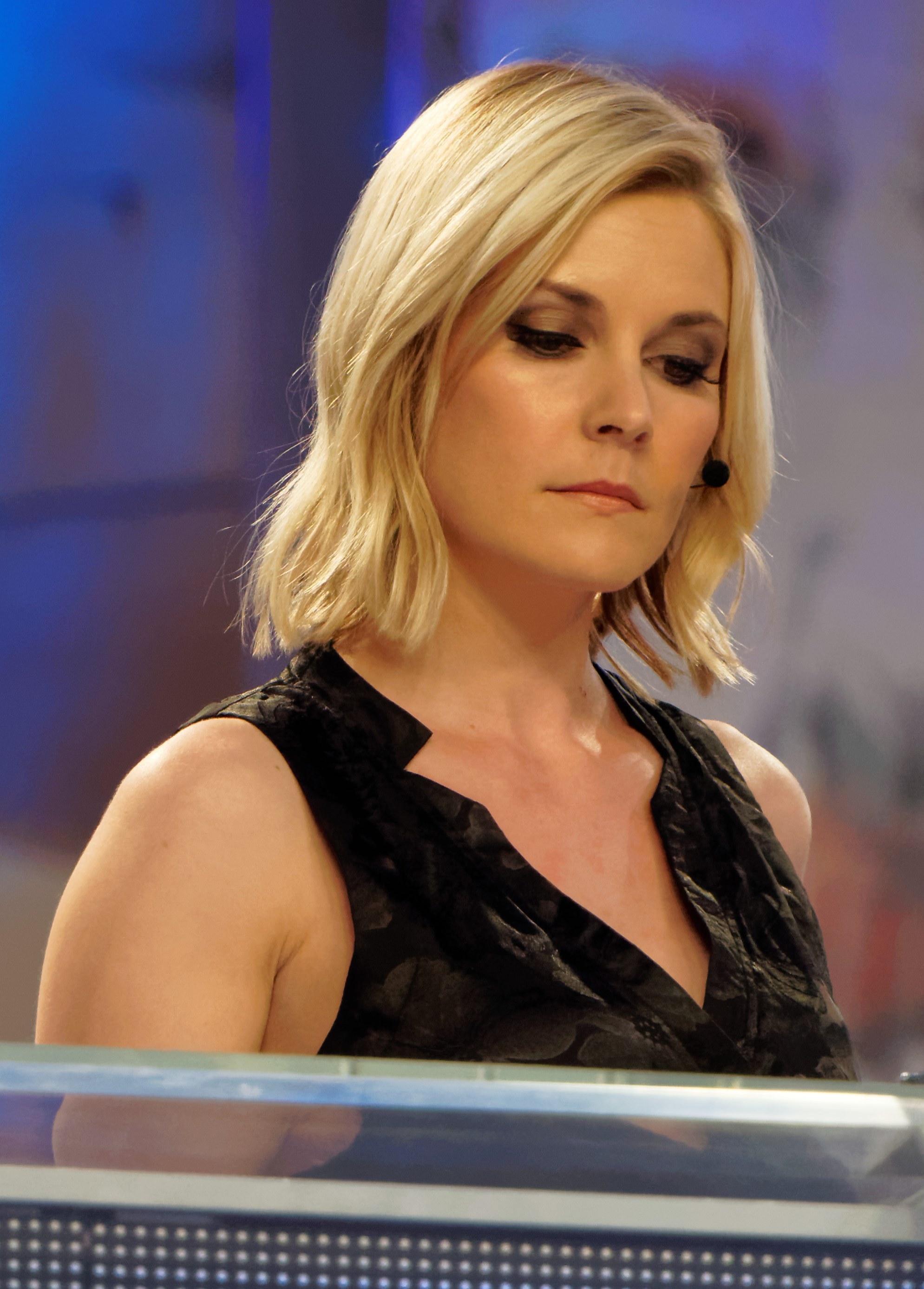
Renee Young; who joined the cast of Total Divas in season 6.

=== Main cast ===
- Brie Bella (Brianna Danielson)
- Eva Marie (Natalie Marie Coyle)
- Naomi (Trinity Fatu)
- Natalya (Natalie Neidhart-Wilson)
- Nikki Bella (Stephanie Garcia-Colace)
- Paige (Saraya-Jade Bevis)
- Lana (Catherine Perry)
- Maryse (Maryse Mizanin)
- Renee Young (Renee Paquette)

=== Recurring cast ===
- Alicia Fox (Victoria Crawford)
- Summer Rae (Danielle Moinet)
- Daniel Bryan (Brie's husband)
- Jimmy Uso (Naomi's husband)
- John Cena (Nikki's fiancé)
- Mark Carrano (WWE Senior Director of Talent Relations)
- Kathy Colace (Brie & Nikki's mother)
- Dolph Ziggler (Nicholas "Nick" Nemeth)
- Rusev (Lana's husband)
- The Miz (Maryse's husband)
- Dean Ambrose (Renee's husband)

=== Guest stars ===
- JoJo (Joseann Offerman)
- Rosa Mendes (Milena Roucka)
- Jonathan Coyle (Eva Marie's husband)
- Alberto Del Rio (José Alberto Rodríguez)
- Dana Brooke (Ashley Sebera)
- Emma (Tenille Dashwood)
- John Laurinaitis (WWE employee & Kathy's husband)
- Tamina (Sarona Snuka-Polamalu)
- Jim Neidhart (Nattie's father)
- Lilian Garcia (Former WWE Ring Announcer)
- Ellie Neidhart (Nattie's mother)
- J.J. Garcia (Brie & Nikki's brother)
- Jenni Neidhart (Nattie's sister)

== Episodes ==
No. overall	No. in season	Title	Original release date	Prod. code	U.S. viewers (millions)
73	1	"Total Superstars"	November 16, 2016	601	0.72
As WrestleMania 32 approaches, the divas are told that they will no longer be called Divas, but rather Superstars like their male counterparts within the WWE; Lana makes her in-ring debut and Brie & Nikki talk about Brie's retirement; while Trinity's hair get damaged.
74	2	"Orlando Strong"	November 23, 2016	602	0.46
Trinity goes to Orlando to honor the victims of the Orlando nightclub shooting; Bryan's depression deepens while Lana annoys Nattie.
75	3	"A Big Flippin' Deal"	November 30, 2016	603	0.59
Maryse clashes with Mike about a dog while Brie has a pregnancy scare and Trinity is offered a role in The Marine 5: Battleground.
76	4	"Gone Girl"	December 7, 2016	604	0.56
Nattie throws a party for Trinity while Paige shows off her new boyfriend, Alberto Del Rio, while Renee worries about her recent work ethic and Nikki asks Bryan to help her with her comeback to the WWE.
77	5	"Mother of the Groom"	December 14, 2016	605	0.55
Renee and Paige dance and chat while backstage. Bryan and Brie go to lunch in which Brie states she would like to see Dean Ambrose and Renee's new house in Las Vegas. Lana's parents and brother come to live with Lana and Rusev.
78	6	"Too Many Cooks"	December 21, 2016	606	0.70
Trinity fights with her nerves on set while Brie challenges Nikki to an IQ test. Nattie exerts pressure on her sister while Lana and Rusev fight over wedding engagement photographs.
79	7	"A Win-Wine Situation"	March 8, 2017	607	0.73
Paige attempts to hide a severe neck injury while Nikki wants to start a winery and becomes offended when Brie doesn't take her genuinely. Nattie's wrestling character has to turn "heel" which the crowd doesn't know how to respond to the change.
80	8	"Pain in The Neck"	March 15, 2017	608	0.58
Paige finds out the results of her MRI while Brie becomes torn when Bryan receives a new job offer. Renee gets stuck as the proverbial third wheel while Nattie pulls out all the stops to get out of planning Lana's wedding.
81	9	"What Happens in Vegas..."	March 22, 2017	609	0.58
Lana runs into much chaos during her bachelorette trip with Renee and Trinity, and Nikki's nerves get the best of her when her family has to walk the red carpet as her boyfriend, John Cena, hosts the ESPYs.
82	10	"The Big Day"	March 29, 2017	610	0.69
Renee brings Dean home to meet her family; the big wedding day for Lana and Rusev has finally arrived, and Nikki discovers if she's cleared to return to the WWE in time for the WWE draft.
83	11	"The Draft"	April 5, 2017	611	0.66
The WWE wrestlers nervously await their fates as the WWE Draft takes place, which could affect relationships and friendships. Meanwhile, Nikki is determined to get back in the ring by seeking help from Nattie to train with her and Paige has a breakdown over her relationship with Alberto Del Rio.
84	12	"Feel the Glow"	April 12, 2017	612	0.59
Trinity feels nervous about debuting her new look; Maryse and Eva's bikini photo shoot takes a different turn; Renee tries something new with Dean and Brie accompanies Bryan on the road, but starts to feel lost in the process.
85	13	"Group-Sext"	April 26, 2017	613	0.58
Maryse accidentally sends a nude selfie to a bunch of WWE wrestlers; Renee feels like a third wheel when Lana invites Rusev on their charity vacation, and she becomes fed up with Lana's behavior; Brie debates if she really wants a kid; Eva starts a new storyline and Paige gets suspended from WWE.
86	14	"Runaway Bride"	May 3, 2017	614	0.56
During their wedding, Rusev pushes Lana outside of her comfort zone; Nicole gets an offer to go on Dancing with the Stars and has to make a choice between expanding her career or staying with the WWE and Eva pushes a healthier lifestyle on her sick father.
87	15	"Swimming With Pigs"	May 10, 2017	615	0.57
Forced to retire her signature move, the "Rack Attack", Nicole struggles to find her new identity; Maryse and Eva take their hubbies on a joint honeymoon trip to Exuma, but they end up swimming with pigs and Nattie looks into expanding her cats fan base.
88	16	"Total Summerslam"	May 17, 2017	616	0.68
The WWE wrestlers take New York City by storm during SummerSlam week; Nicole comes to terms with not being able to make the comeback of her dreams; and Eva gets suspended from WWE; while Lana and Trinity have a dance off and Maryse throws a prom themed party.

== Ratings ==
No.	Title	Original Air date	Viewership (millions) (Live+SD)	Rating/share (18–49) (Live+SD)	Rank per week on Cable
1	"Total Superstars"	November 16, 2016	0.72	.03/4.14	#22
2	"Orlando Strong"	November 23, 2016	0.46	TBD	#46
3	"A Big Flippin' Deal	November 30, 2016	0.59	TBD	#24
4	"Gone Girl"	December 7, 2016	0.56	TBD	#26
5	"Mother of the Groom"	December 14, 2016	0.55	TBD	#19
6	"Too Many Cooks"	December 21, 2016	0.70	TBD	#12
7	"A Win-Wine Situation"	January 4, 2017	0.73	TBD	#12
8	"Pain in The Neck"	January 11, 2017	0.58	TBD	#35
9	"What Happens in Vegas..."	January 18, 2017	0.58	TBD	#27
10	"The Big Day"	January 25, 2017	0.69	TBD	#32
11	"The Draft"	April 5, 2017	0.66	TBD	#14
12	"Feel the Glow"	April 12, 2017	0.59	TBD	#26
13	"Group-Sext"	April 19, 2017	0.58	TBD	#31
14	"Runaway Bride"	April 26, 2017	0.56	TBD	#32
15	"Swimming With Pigs"	May 3, 2017	0.57	TBD	#19
16	"Total Summerslam"	May 10, 2017	0.68	TBD	#25
