= Nia Jax =

Australian and American professional wrestler (born 1984)

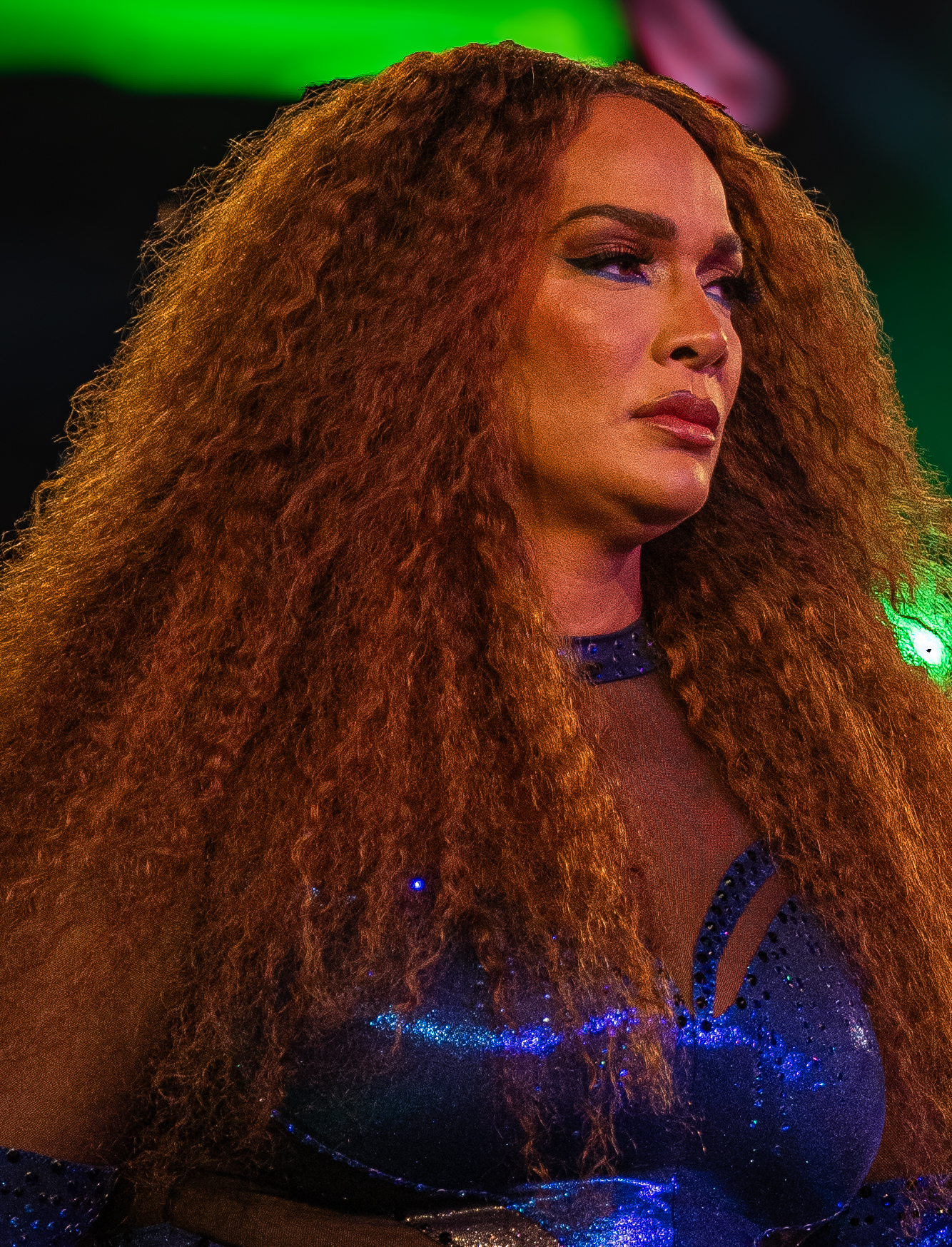
- Jax in 2025

Personal information
- Born: Savelina Fanene; May 29, 1984 (age 42) Sydney, New South Wales, Australia
- Education: California State University San Marcos (BBA)
- Relative: Dwayne Johnson (second cousin once removed)

Professional wrestling career
- Ring name(s): Lina; Lina Fanene; Nia Jax; Zada
- Billed height: 6 ft 0 in (183 cm)
- Billed weight: 272 lb (123 kg)
- Billed from: San Diego, California
- Trained by: WWE Performance Center
- Debut: May 7, 2015

Savelina Fanene (born May 29, 1984) is an Australian and American professional wrestler. She is signed to WWE where she performs on the SmackDown brand under the ring name Nia Jax (/ˈnaɪə/ NY-ə).

Fanene signed to WWE in early 2014 and was first assigned to the developmental brand NXT. She debuted in May 2015 under the ring name Zada, which was changed to Nia Jax in August that year. As part of the 2016 WWE Draft, she was promoted to the main roster. Fanene was released from her WWE contract in November 2021, but after a brief appearance at the Royal Rumble in January 2023, she re-signed with the company, making her return in September.

== Early life ==
Savelina Fanene was born in Sydney, Australia on May 29, 1984, and raised in Honolulu, Hawaii. She is of German and Samoan descent, and is the second cousin once removed of Dwayne "The Rock" Johnson as her father Joseph was Johnson's grandfather Peter Maivia’s cousin. She later lived in San Diego, California, and attended Carlsbad High School. She attended Palomar College in San Marcos, California, where she played college basketball, and graduated from Cal State San Marcos with a marketing degree in 2005. Prior to professional wrestling, she worked as a plus-size model.

== Professional wrestling career ==
=== WWE ===
==== NXT (2014–2016) ====
Jax was signed by WWE in early 2014 and was assigned to their developmental territory NXT, based at the WWE Performance Center in Orlando, Florida. She made her in-ring debut on May 7, 2015, at an NXT house show under the ring name Zada teaming with Devin Taylor in a defeat to Bayley and Carmella in a tag team match. In August, her ring name was changed to Nia Jax.

After a series of introductory vignettes throughout September, Jax made her debut on October 14 episode of NXT defeating Evie in a singles match. Following her debut, she was shown slowly turning heel while going on a winning streak, defeating various enhancement talents and NXT Diva Carmella. In November, Jax formed an alliance with Eva Marie and started her first feud with Bayley over the NXT Women's Championship, cementing her heel status. Jax earned a title match on December 16 at NXT TakeOver: London, yet she was unsuccessful in winning the title.

On the January 27, 2016, episode of NXT, Jax returned to the ring after a month of inactivity due to a storyline injury with a win over Liv Morgan. On the February 10 episode of NXT, Jax assisted Marie in an attack on Bayley and Carmella after their championship match until Asuka made the save that led to a tag team match on the February 24 episode of NXT where Jax and Marie scored the victory. On the May 25 episode of NXT, Jax won a triple threat match over Alexa Bliss and Carmella to become the number one contender to Asuka's NXT Women's Championship. On June 8, Jax lost her title match at NXT TakeOver: The End. On July 20 episode of NXT, Jax was defeated by Bayley. On December 28 episode of NXT, Jax lost to Asuka for the NXT Women's Championship in her last match in NXT.

==== Main roster beginnings (2016–2018) ====
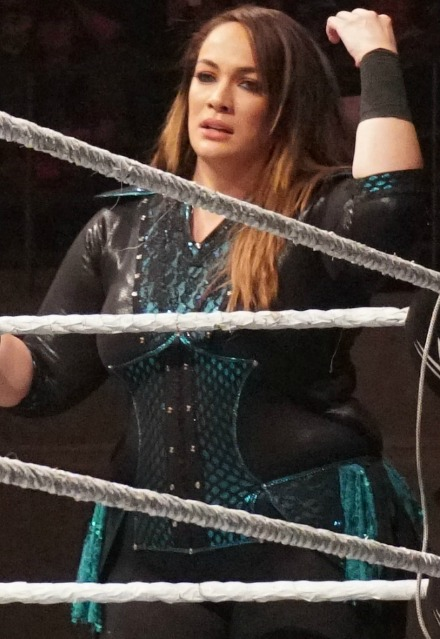
Jax in May 2017

Shortly after being drafted from NXT to the Raw brand as part of the 2016 WWE draft, which took place on July 19, 2016, Jax started a winning streak against various competitors. In September, Jax was placed in her first feud with Alicia Fox, which led to a match between the two on the September 12 episode of Raw that ended in a no contest after she performed a spear on Fox through the ringside barricade. In a rematch between the two that took place at the Clash of Champions pre-show on September 25, Jax defeated Fox via pinfall. On November 20 at Survivor Series, Jax was a part of Team Raw in a five-on-five elimination tag team match and was eliminated via submission by Becky Lynch.

In December, Jax started a feud with her mentor Sasha Banks, whom she injured as part of the storyline. This led to two matches between the two, where Jax was first victorious at the Royal Rumble pre-show on January 29, 2017, but lost on March 5 at Fastlane. On April 3 at WrestleMania 33, Jax competed in a fatal four-way elimination match against Banks, Bayley and Charlotte Flair for the Raw Women's Championship, but she was eliminated first. On the June 26 episode of Raw, Jax competed in a gauntlet match to determine a number one contender for Alexa Bliss's Raw Women's Championship, eliminating Bayley, Mickie James, Dana Brooke and Emma consecutively before being defeated by Banks. On September 24 at No Mercy, Jax took part of a fatal five-way match for the Raw Women's Championship, but she failed to win the title. On November 19 at Survivor Series, Jax once again was a part of Team Raw in a five-on-five elimination tag team match from which she was eliminated by countout.

Starting from December 4 episode of Raw, Jax was placed in an on-screen relationship with then WWE Cruiserweight Champion Enzo Amore, which was dropped when Amore was released from the WWE in January 2018. On January 28 at the Royal Rumble, Jax participated in the first women's royal rumble match where she entered at number 22 and eliminated Jacqueline, Kelly Kelly, Ruby Riott and Naomi before being eliminated by six women. Throughout January and February, Jax started a feud with the undefeated Asuka, whom she failed to defeat on February 25 at Elimination Chamber and a week later on Raw.

==== Raw Women's Champion and alliance with Tamina (2018–2019) ====
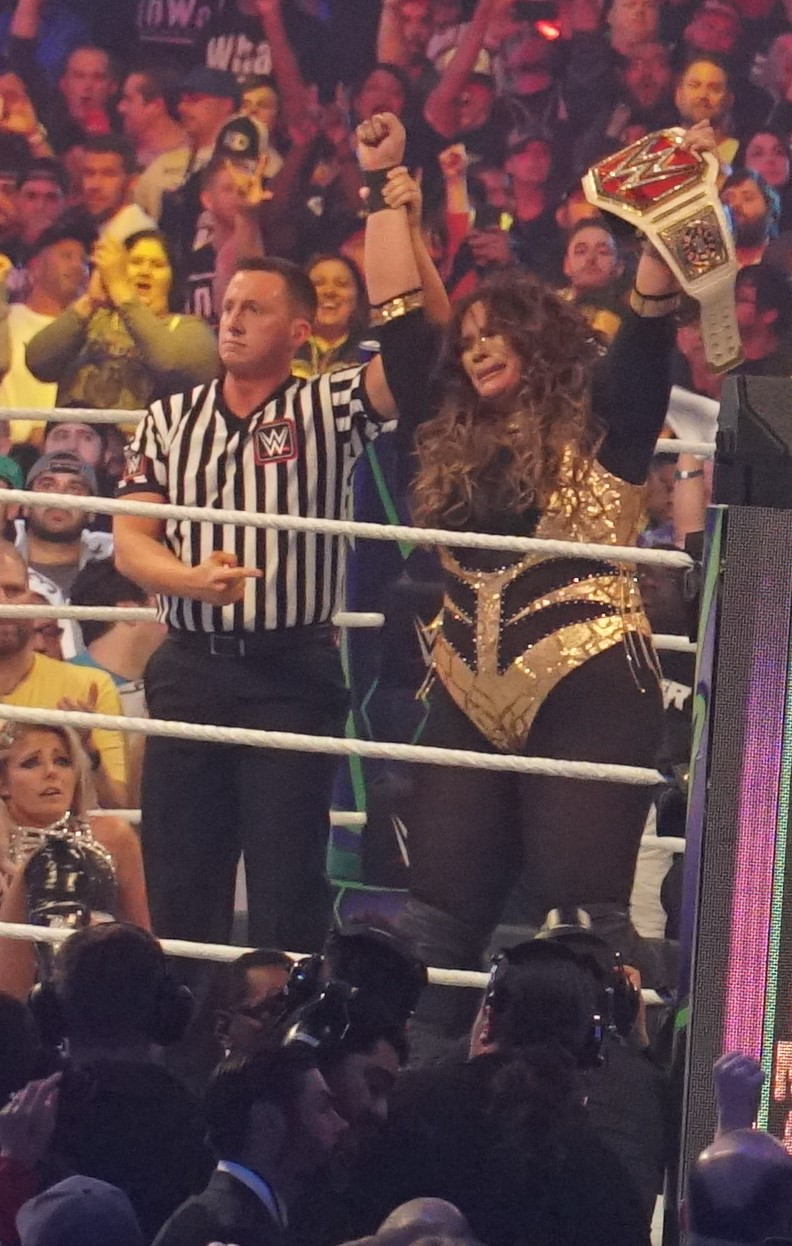
Jax after winning the Raw Women's Championship at WrestleMania 34

In March, Jax turned face after being insulted and betrayed by former best friend, Raw Women's Champion Alexa Bliss, who body shamed her and made fun of her personality. This led to a title match between the two on April 8, 2018, at WrestleMania 34, where she won the match to capture the Raw Women's Championship, marking the first title win of her career. In a rematch between the two, that took place a month later at Backlash on May 6, Jax went on to defeat Bliss and retain her title. In May, Jax started a feud with Ronda Rousey whom she challenged to a title match at Money in the Bank pay-per-view. During that feud, Jax briefly returned to her villainous theatrics. At Money in the Bank, on June 17, Jax lost her championship back to Bliss, who interfered in her match and attacked both Jax and Rousey, cashing in her Money in the Bank contract (which she won earlier that night). A month later, on July 15, Jax invoked her rematch clause at Extreme Rules, but was unsuccessful in regaining the title in an extreme rules match.

After a short hiatus due to a minor injury, Jax returned on the September 17 episode of Raw as the mystery tag team partner of Ember Moon, with the two going on to defeat Alicia Fox and Mickie James. One month later, on October 28, at the WWE Evolution pay-per-view, Jax eliminated Moon as she won a battle royal to earn a future women's championship match. On the November 5 episode of Raw, shortly after defeating Moon in a singles match, Jax once again turned heel as she aligned herself with Tamina (with whom she had multiple confrontations the past few weeks, forming the Samoan Slaughterhouse) and attacked Moon. On November 18, at Survivor Series, Jax was the sole survivor for Team Raw against Team SmackDown in an interbrand women's traditional five-on-five tag team elimination match. The following month, on December 16, at the TLC: Tables, Ladders & Chairs event, Jax failed to regain the Raw Women's Championship from Rousey.

On January 27, 2019, at the Royal Rumble event, Jax competed in the women's Royal Rumble match, entering at number 29 and lasting for over 11 minutes before she herself was eliminated by the eventual winner Becky Lynch. Later that night, Jax made history as she became the first person to ever compete in two Royal Rumble matches on the same night and the fourth woman to ever compete in a men's Royal Rumble match, after she attacked R-Truth and took his number 30 spot. Despite eliminating Mustafa Ali, Jax was ganged up by Dolph Ziggler, Rey Mysterio and Randy Orton with their finishers, before being eliminated by Mysterio. On February 17, 2019, Jax and Tamina competed in a six-team Elimination Chamber match at the namesake pay-per-view to determine the inaugural holders of the WWE Women's Tag Team Championship, where they eliminated two teams before they themselves were eliminated. In April, at WrestleMania 35, Jax and Tamina took part of a fatal four-way match for the Women's Tag Team Championship, however, the match was won by The IIconics (Billie Kay and Peyton Royce). Shortly after, Jax underwent surgery to repair tears on the anterior cruciate ligament (ACL) in both of her knees, which was expected to sideline her from in-ring competition for at least nine months.

==== Teaming with Shayna Baszler (2020–2021) ====
Jax returned from injury on the April 6, 2020, episode of Raw, defeating Deonna Purrazzo in a squash match. On the May 25 episode of Raw, Jax defeated Charlotte Flair and Natalya in a triple threat match to challenge Asuka for the Raw Women's Championship at Backlash. At Backlash, Jax and Asuka wrestled to a double countout, therefore Asuka retained the title. The next night on Raw, Jax challenged Asuka again for the title. During the match, Jax became upset with the referee and pushed him down. The referee was going to disqualify Jax, however, Asuka rolled up the distracted Jax for a fast count to retain the title.

In August, she was paired with Shayna Baszler, defeating the WWE Women's Tag Team Champions Bayley and Sasha Banks at Payback to win the title. They lost the title at TLC against the team of Asuka and Charlotte Flair. At Royal Rumble on January 31, 2021, Baszler and Jax defeated Asuka and Flair to become record-tying two-time WWE Women's Tag Team Champions. During their second reign as tag team champions, they had simultaneous feuds with the teams of Naomi and Lana, Mandy Rose and Dana Brooke, and Natalya and Tamina. They defended the title against all of them on different occasions but were victorious in every bout.

At WrestleMania 37, Jax and Baszler retained the tag team championship against Natalya and Tamina. On the May 14 episode of SmackDown, they lost the title to Natalya and Tamina, ending their second reign at 103 days. On the September 20 episode of Raw, Jax's alliance with Shayna Baszler ended when her partner attacked her. After the team disbanded, she asked WWE for time off to take care of her mental health, but on November 4, Jax was released from her WWE contract.

=== Return to WWE ===
==== Queen of the Ring and WWE Women's Champion (2023–2025) ====
Jax returned in the 2023 Women's Royal Rumble for a one-off appearance as the 30th entrant and was eliminated by the combined efforts of the remaining 11 women in the ring. Jax made her full-time return to WWE on the September 11 episode on Raw, attacking Raquel Rodriguez and Women's World Champion Rhea Ripley. At Crown Jewel on November 4, Jax failed to win the title from Ripley in a fatal five-way match also involving Rodriguez, Zoey Stark, and Shayna Baszler, who Ripley pinned to retain. Over the next few months, Jax went on a winning streak, defeating Baszler, Rodriguez, and Stark in several matches. Jax reignited her feud with Becky Lynch, culminating in a match at Day 1 where Jax was victorious. At the Royal Rumble on January 27, Jax entered the women's Royal Rumble match at #19, scoring a record-tying eight eliminations before being eliminated by the debuting Jade Cargill. After the Royal Rumble, Jax continued feuding with Ripley, culminating in a title match in the main event of Elimination Chamber: Perth, but Jax failed to win the title from Ripley.

After being drafted to the SmackDown brand as part of the 2024 WWE Draft, Jax participated in the Queen of the Ring tournament defeating Naomi in the first round. Jax went on to defeat Jade Cargill in the quarterfinals by disqualification after Cargill attacked Jax with a steel chair in response to Jax taunting Cargill's daughter at ringside, Bianca Belair in the semifinals, and Lyra Valkyria in the finals at King and Queen of the Ring to win the tournament, earning a WWE Women's Championship match at SummerSlam. At the event on August 3, Jax defeated Bayley to win the title after interference from her new ally, Tiffany Stratton. On the August 30 episode of SmackDown, Jax defeated Michin to retain her title in a street fight in her first title defense. At Bad Blood on October 5, Jax retained her title against Bayley after interference from Stratton. At Crown Jewel on November 2, Jax faced Women's World Champion Liv Morgan for the inaugural WWE Women's Crown Jewel Championship in a losing effort after interference from Morgan's Judgment Day stablemates, "Dirty" Dominik Mysterio and Raquel Rodriguez. At Survivor Series WarGames on November 30, Jax participated in her first WarGames match alongside Stratton, Morgan, Rodriguez and Candice LeRae against Bayley, Belair, Naomi, Iyo Sky and Rhea Ripley in a losing effort. On the January 3, 2025 episode of SmackDown, Jax successfully defended the title against Naomi after interference from LeRae and Stratton. After the match, Stratton turned on Jax and successfully cashed in her Money in the Bank briefcase, ending Jax's reign at 153 days.

==== Various feuds; The Irresistible Forces (2025–present) ====
At Saturday Night's Main Event, Jax faced Rhea Ripley for the Women's World Championship, but failed again to win the title. At Royal Rumble on February 1, Jax entered the namesake match at #29, scoring a record-setting nine eliminations. Jax finished in third place, being eliminated by eventual winner Charlotte Flair. At Elimination Chamber: Toronto, Jax and LeRae were defeated by Stratton and Trish Stratus in a tag team match. Jax returned on the April 25 episode of SmackDown, where she attacked Stratton. On the May 16 episode of SmackDown, Jax failed to win the WWE Women' s Championship from Stratton. On the June 27 episode of SmackDown, Jax once again failed to win the WWE Women's Championship from Stratton in a Last Women's Standing match. At Evolution on July 13, Jax participated in a battle royal, which was won by Stephanie Vaquer. On the July 29 episode of NXT Jax returned and attacked Lash Legend. On the August 5 episode, she defeated Thea Hail. Jax defeated Legend on the August 15 episode.

On the November 7 episode of SmackDown, Jax aligned herself with the debuting Lash Legend. At Survivor Series: WarGames, Jax and Legend teamed with Becky Lynch and The Kabuki Warriors (Asuka and Kairi Sane) to face AJ Lee, Alexa Bliss, Charlotte Flair, and Rhiyo (Rhea Ripley and Iyo Sky) in the WarGames match in a losing effort. At the Royal Rumble on January 31, 2026, Jax entered the match at #4 being eliminated by Flair. On the February 27 episode of SmackDown, Jax and Legend, now known as The Irresistible Forces, defeated Rhiyo to win the WWE Women's Tag Team Championship for the first time as a team and Jax's third time individually. At WrestleMania 42 Night 1 on April 18, Jax and Legend lost the titles to the returning Paige and Brie Bella ending their reign at 50 days.

== Professional wrestling style, persona, and reception ==
Jax was given the nickname "The Irresistible Force" during her first run in WWE. She uses a Banzai drop named the Annihilator as a finisher.

Jax received increasing criticism over the years for reports of her being an "unsafe worker". In November 2018, she accidentally punched Becky Lynch in the face during an episode of Raw and gave Lynch a broken nose, lacerated face, and concussion. In May 2020, Kairi Sane suffered a cut on her head during a match against Jax after Jax threw her onto the ringside steel steps. Wrestling promoter and manager Jim Cornette attributed incidents involving Jax to her size, often mockingly referring to her as "Refrigerator Jax", and suggested that she "can hurt people whether she knows it or not", while fellow professional wrestler Deonna Purrazzo stated that she had "never walked away hurt" after wrestling Jax.

== Other media ==
As Nia Jax, Fanene is a playable character in the WWE video games WWE 2K17, WWE 2K18, WWE 2K19, WWE 2K20, WWE 2K22, WWE 2K Battlegrounds, WWE 2K24 as downloadable content.,, WWE 2K25 and WWE 2K26

In July 2017, Jax joined the cast of the reality television series Total Divas beginning in its seventh season.

In August 2017, rapper Magneto Dayo released a song dedicated to her titled "Nia Jax".

== Personal life ==
On August 2, 2014, Fanene and her cousin Ata Maivia-Johnson (the mother of Dwayne "The Rock" Johnson), were hospitalized after being hit head-on by a drunk driver in Clermont, Florida. The driver was subsequently charged with driving under the influence.

In April 2024, Fanene was baptized into the Christian faith at Discovery Church in Orlando, Florida.

== Filmography ==
Television
Year	Title	Role	Notes
2017–2019	Total Divas	Main cast: 32 episodes	
2020	Fight Like a Girl	Episode: “Nia Jax and Adriana”	

== Championships and accomplishments ==
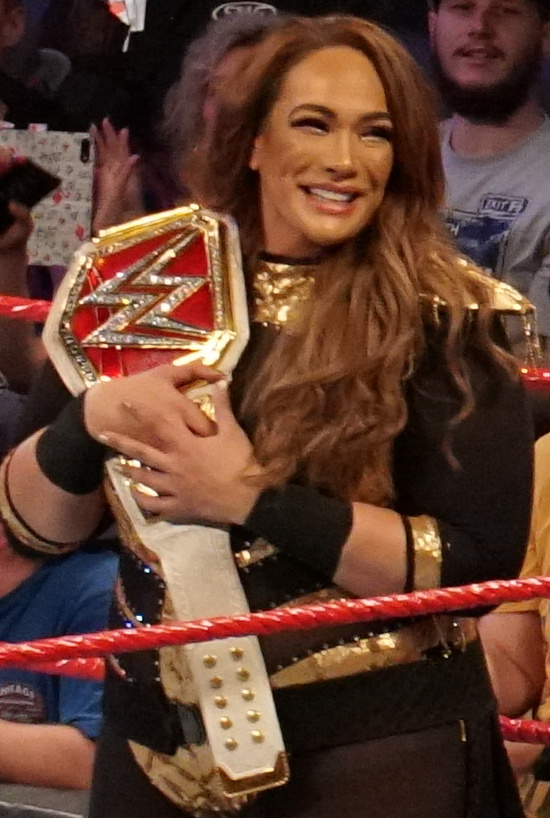
Jax is a two-time WWE Women's Champion

- Association of National Advertisers
  - A.N.A.’s #SeeHER Now Award (2018)
- Pro Wrestling Illustrated
  - Rookie of the Year (2016)
  - Ranked No. 8 of the top 50 female singles wrestlers in the PWI Female 100 in 2018
  - Ranked No. 24 of the top 50 Tag Teams in the PWI Tag Team 50 in 2021– with Shayna Baszler
  - Ranked No. 24 of the top 250 female singles wrestlers in the PWI Female 250 in 2024
- Rolling Stone
  - Most Overdue Yet-to-Be Title Holder of the Year (2017)
- Wrestling Observer Newsletter
  - Most Overrated (2024)
- WWE
  - WWE Women's Championship (2 times) (Note: Jax's first reign occurred when the title was known as the Raw Women's Championship.)
  - WWE Women's Tag Team Championship (3 times) – with Shayna Baszler (2) and Lash Legend (1)
  - Queen of the Ring (2024)
  - Evolution Battle Royal (2018)
