= Rosa Mendes =

Canadian professional wrestler and model (born 1979)

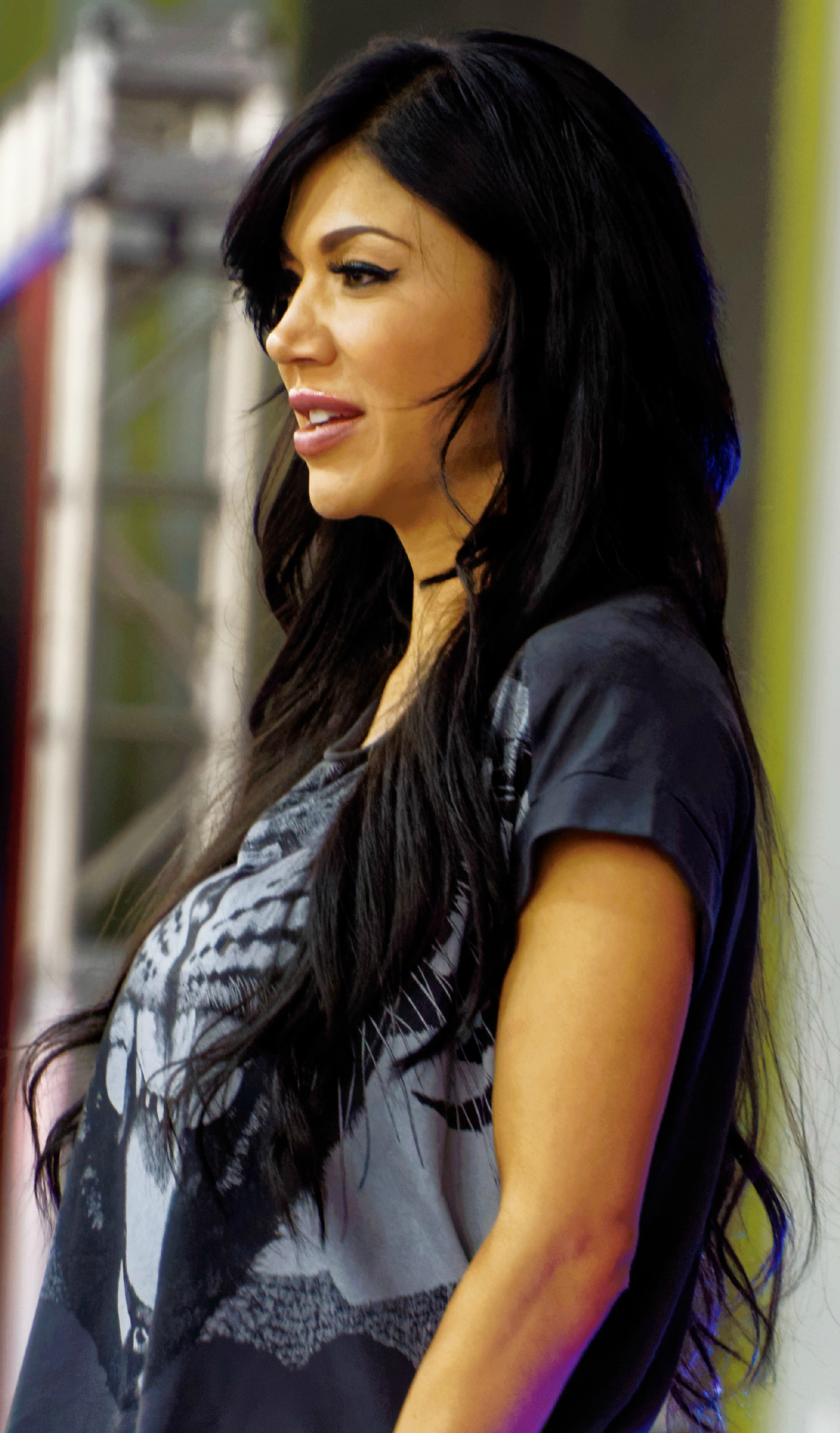
- Mendes in 2015

Personal information
- Born: Milena Leticia Roucka; October 25, 1979 (age 46) Vancouver, British Columbia, Canada
- Education: University of British Columbia
- Children: 1

Professional wrestling career
- Ring name(s): Rosa Mendes; Melina Roucka; Roucka
- Billed height: 5 ft 8 in (173 cm)
- Billed weight: 125 lb (57 kg)
- Billed from: San Jose, Costa Rica; San Juan, Puerto Rico; San Mateo, California
- Trained by: Ohio Valley Wrestling; WWE Performance Center
- Debut: November 2006
- Retired: 2018

Milena Leticia Roucka (/ˈroʊkə/ ROH-kə; born October 25, 1979) is a Canadian retired professional wrestler, valet and model. She was known for her time in WWE under the ring name Rosa Mendes. She managed former WWE Tag Team Champions Primo & Epico from 2011 to 2013. She was also a main cast member on the E! reality series Total Divas.

== Early life ==
Roucka grew up in Vancouver, British Columbia and is of Czech and Costa Rican descent. She was a self-described "tomboy" growing up, and was once suspended from school for fighting. Roucka studied business at the University of British Columbia, but dropped out to pursue a career in modelling. In 2004, she was the first North American to win the "Piel Dorada", a major Latin American modelling contest.

== Professional wrestling career ==
=== World Wrestling Entertainment/WWE ===
==== Diva Search (2006–2008) ====
In the summer of 2006, Roucka competed in the WWE Diva Search and reached the final eight. She won the first round, a dance competition. After she was eliminated on August 24, WWE then signed her to a developmental contract.

==== Beth Phoenix's intern (2008–2009) ====
On the November 24, 2008 episode of Raw, Roucka appeared as a planted fan, holding a sign proclaiming her WWE Women's Champion Beth Phoenix's number one fan. Over the next few weeks, she continued holding signs supporting Phoenix. On the December 22 Raw, Phoenix's boyfriend/tag partner Santino Marella introduced her as Rosa Mendes. The next week, she jumped the guardrail and attacked the new number one contender, Melina, who was attacking Phoenix. The next week, Stephanie McMahon said Mendes had been banned from WWE events after attacking Melina again. Mendes evaded the ban by disguising herself as a paparazzo in Melina's entrance and attacked her again.

On the January 19, 2009 episode of Raw, Marella announced he had hired Mendes to be his and Phoenix's intern. Mendes accompanied Phoenix for her Women's title match against Melina on the February 16 episode of Raw, and again in a dark match at No Way Out pay-per-view. On the March 30 episode of Raw, Mendes made her in-ring debut in an 18-woman tag team match, which her team lost. At WrestleMania XXV, Mendes competed in a 25-woman battle royal, but was eliminated by Marella, who competed in drag, claiming to be his twin sister "Santina". Phoenix, with Mendes managing her, had a brief scripted rivalry with both "Santina" and Marella, and challenged "Santina" for the "Miss WrestleMania" title, but was unsuccessful. On the June 11 episode of Superstars, Mendes got her first televised win when she teamed with Beth Phoenix against The Bella Twins where Phoenix pinned one of the Bellas. Mendes made her singles debut against Mickie James on the June 15 Raw, in a losing effort. After a brief hiatus, Mendes and Phoenix returned on the July 27 episode of Raw, teaming with Alicia Fox in a losing effort to Mickie James, Gail Kim, and Kelly Kelly.

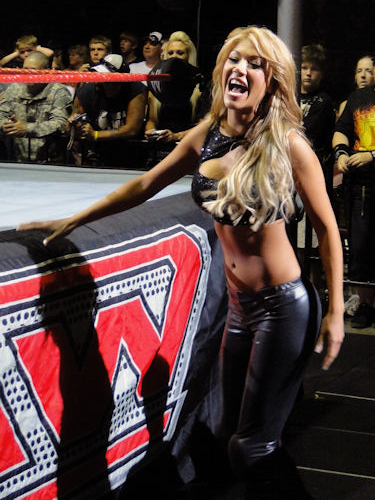
Mendes during a Raw live event in August 2009

In August 2009, she began managing Carlito after teaming with him on the August 13 episode of Superstars, to defeat Kofi Kingston and Mickie James in a mixed tag team match, and her association with Beth Phoenix quietly ended. On the August 31 episode of Raw, Mendes lost a battle royal to determine the number one contender to the WWE Divas Championship when she was eliminated by Beth Phoenix.

==== Brand switches (2009–2011) ====
On October 12, 2009, Mendes was traded from Raw to the ECW brand. She debuted on the October 20 episode of ECW, in a backstage segment with ECW general manager, Tiffany, who welcomed her to ECW.

On the November 3 episode of ECW she began distracting Zack Ryder, who was infatuated with her, during his matches. On the November 25 ECW, Mendes began a personal and managerial relationship with Ryder. She managed him through various feuds, including one with Tommy Dreamer, culminating on December 29, when he defeated Dreamer to force him from WWE. On the final episode of ECW on February 16, 2010, Ryder and Mendes interfered in the main event match, and Mendes was speared by Tiffany.

Ryder and Mendes then moved to the Raw brand. She made her in-ring return on the April 5 Raw, in a Divas Championship number-one-contender battle royal, which Eve Torres won. On April 27, Mendes was drafted to the SmackDown brand as part of the 2010 Supplemental Draft, without Ryder. She and Ryder reunited on the April 29 Superstars, where she managed him to a win over Primo. In her debut match for SmackDown, she lost to Kelly Kelly. On the May 6 episode of Superstars, Mendes faced Beth Phoenix in a non-title match in which Phoenix tore her ACL. As a result, one week later on SmackDown, Mendes received a WWE Women's Championship match, though she was ejected from the match by Vickie Guerrero and replaced by Michelle McCool and Layla.

In June 2010, Mendes tried to join LayCool (Michelle McCool and Layla), who refused and instead mocked her. Over the next few months, Mendes exercised in backstage segments in an attempt to impress LayCool, and cost Layla a match by distracting her by skipping rope at ringside. On the September 17 episode of SmackDown, Rosa Mendes turned face by teaming with Kelly Kelly to lose to LayCool. In late 2010, Rosa Mendes appeared mainly in backstage segments with various wrestlers, including Kane and Hornswoggle. On February 25, 2011, Mendes won her first SmackDown singles match, over Layla by disqualification, after McCool attacked her outside the ring. The next week, Mendes reunited with Beth Phoenix, teaming to lose to LayCool. On the March 25 episode of SmackDown!, Mendes teamed with Kelly Kelly to again lose to LayCool.

After some time away, Mendes returned on the May 27 episode of SmackDown as a heel, managing the team of Tamina and Alicia Fox to a win over The Chickbusters (AJ and Kaitlyn). They also won the rematch a week later. On the June 17 episode of SmackDown, Mendes teamed with Fox and Snuka to defeat The Chickbusters and Natalya. On the June 23 episode of Superstars, they lost a rematch. On the July 29 episode of Smackdown, they won the rubber match. On the July 15 episode of SmackDown, Mendes lost to Divas Champion Kelly Kelly in a non-title match. On the August 1 episode of Raw, Mendes competed in a Divas Championship number-one-contenders battle royal, which Beth Phoenix won.

==== Managing Primo and Epico (2011–2013) ====
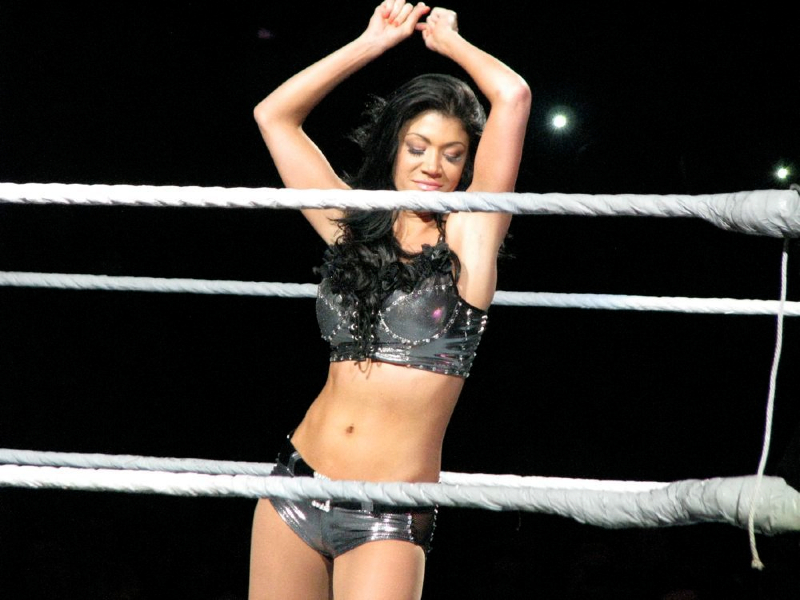
Mendes at a Raw live event in Australia in September 2012

Mendes started managing Primo & Epico on the December 1, 2011 Superstars. On January 15, 2012, at a house show in Oakland, California, Primo and Epico defeated Air Boom (Evan Bourne and Kofi Kingston) for the WWE Tag Team Championship. On the WrestleMania XXVIII pre-show, they successfully defended the title against The Usos and Justin Gabriel and Tyson Kidd in a Triple Threat tag team match. On the April 30 episode of Raw, Primo and Epico lost the title to R-Truth and Kofi Kingston. Primo, Epico and Mendes then joined Abraham Washington's "All World Promotions" stable, until he turned on them at No Way Out, costing them the match and allying with their opponents, The Prime Time Players (Titus O'Neil & Darren Young). The next night on Raw, Mendes, Primo and Epico turned face when they defeated the Prime Time Players by countout. after Young and O'Neil walked out of the match. At Money in the Bank, Mendes managed Primo and Epico to a win over The Prime Time Players. Following the release of A.W. they quickly returned as heels and from September till the end of the year, Primo and Epico had a losing streak.

==== Various alliances (2013–2015) ====
Roucka took a two-month hiatus to settle some personal issues at home. Mendes returned to television on the July 25 episode of NXT, though she did not wrestle. On August 26, Mendes returned to Raw as a face, dancing with The Miz to distract Fandango before managing him in his match against Fandango. Despite this, she teamed up with the other heel Divas (Aksana and Alicia Fox) on the October 7 episode of Raw in a losing effort against Natalya, Eva Marie and JoJo.

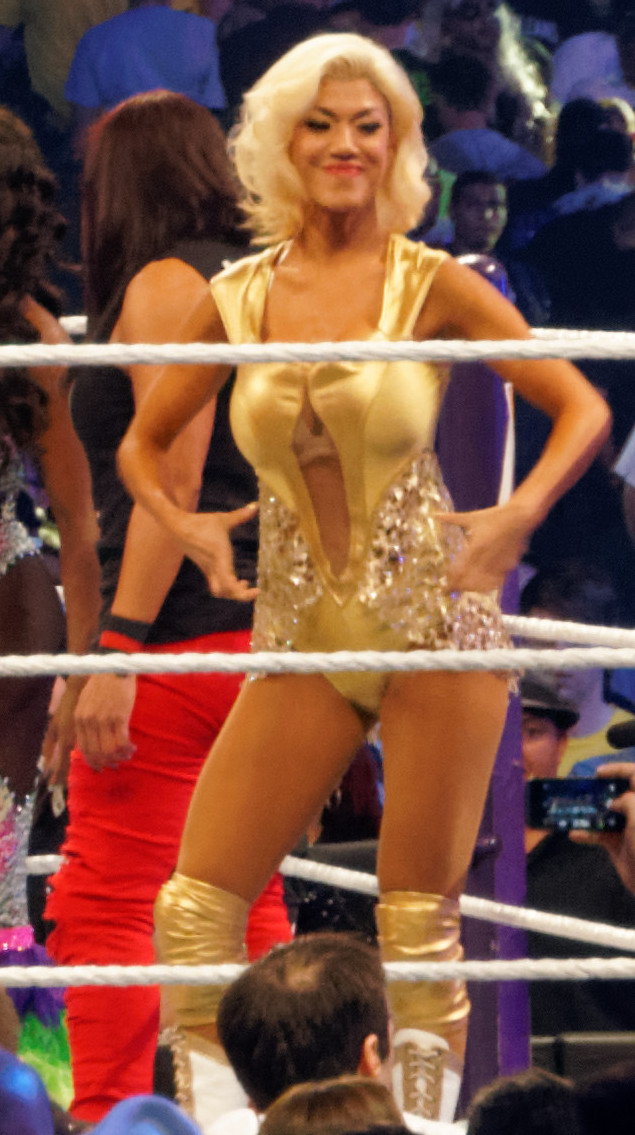
Mendes at WrestleMania XXX in April 2014

Mendes and other Divas began a feud with the cast Total Divas after the implosion on Raw, leading to them accompanying Tamina Snuka on the November 20 episode of Main Event, to defeat Naomi, who had the Total Divas in her corner. At the Survivor Series pay-per-view, Mendes participated in her first pay-per-view match, a seven-on-seven traditional elimination tag team match as her team took on the Total Divas; Mendes managed to eliminate Cameron before she was eliminated, but her team ultimately lost the match. The following night on Raw, they faced the Total Divas in a rematch, in a losing effort. On April 6, Rosa competed at WrestleMania XXX in the 14–Diva "Vickie Guerrero Invitational match" for the WWE Divas Championship, which was won by the defending champion AJ Lee. She returned on the June 23 episode of Raw, interfering on behalf of Stephanie McMahon, along with Layla and Alicia Fox, but was thrown into a mud pool by Vickie Guerrero during their match. On July 8 episode of Main Event, Mendes participated in a six–on–one handicap match with Eva Marie, Summer Rae, Naomi and Natalya against Nikki Bella as part of Stephanie McMahon's punishment against Nikki. Mendes would transition into a fan favorite on the September 2 episode of Main Event, teaming with Natalya in a losing effort to Summer Rae and Layla because of a miscommunication.

After two months of absence, Mendes returned as Fandango's new dance partner on the Survivor Series pre-show on November 23. Fandango defeated Justin Gabriel with a Salsa dancer gimmick and new theme music. On the April 13, 2015 episode of Raw, Fandango dissolved his relationship with Mendes. Later that night, Mendes competed in a Divas battle royal to determine the #1 contender for the WWE Divas Championship. Mendes eliminated Natalya and Summer Rae before being eliminated by Emma. Following the end of her association with Fandango, Mendes ended up costing him a match to Adam Rose, whom she subsequently went on to manage.

==== Correspondent and retirement (2015–2017) ====
As she announced her pregnancy on August 6, Mendes began serving as the WWE.com correspondent for SmackDown in October. The same month, she went on maternity leave, and gave birth on February 13, 2016. She retired from WWE exactly one year later, on February 13, 2017. Her last televised appearance with the company took place as a guest appearance on the sixth season of Total Divas in April, where she was billed as a former WWE Superstar.

=== Independent circuit (2018) ===
In 2018, Roucka announced that she was making her return to professional wrestling. On May 19, Roucka made her first wrestling appearance on MCW Pro Wrestling under her WWE ring name, Rosa Mendes, when she teamed with the former WWE wrestler Adam Rose, which together they successfully defeated the team of Gia Scott and Joe Keys.

== Other media ==
Roucka acted in Costa Rican commercials for Trident, Lux, and Chrysler in 2004.

She portrayed Isabel Díaz in the video game Need for Speed: Most Wanted. In September 2014, Mendes joined the main cast of Total Divas, a reality television show produced by WWE and E!, in which she was a main cast member during the third and the fifth season. Mendes appeared in one WWE video game. She made her in-game debut at WWE 2K16 as a selectable manager.

== Filmography ==
Film and television

Year	Title	Role	Notes
2006	WWE Diva Search	Self; contestant	4th place, 8 episodes
2009	WWE Hall of Fame 2009	Self; audience	TV special
2010	WWE Hall of Fame 2010	Self; audience	TV special
2013	The JBL & Cole Show with Renee Young	Rosa Mendes	1 episode
2014–2017	Total Divas	Self; cast member	34 episodes
2015	Sidewalk Entertainment	Self; guest	1 episode
2015	Swerved	Self; recurring	4 episodes
2018	Miz & Mrs.	Self; guest	1 episode

Video games

Year	Title	Role	Notes
2005	Need for Speed: Most Wanted	Isabel "Izzy" Díaz	
2014	WWE SuperCard	Rosa Mendes	
2015	WWE 2K16	Rosa Mendes	Non-playable character

== Personal life ==
Roucka has trained in kickboxing, Muay Thai and Brazilian Jiu-Jitsu. She cites Trish Stratus as her inspiration for becoming a wrestler. She has a Chinese tattoo which consists of adorned wings and a halo, on the right side of her waist. On May 18, 2012, she suffered whiplash in a car accident.

Roucka came out on Total Divas as bisexual in 2014. But, in a later interview, stated that she was straight. On August 6, 2015, Roucka announced that she and her partner, musician and clothing company owner Bobby Schubenski, were expecting their first child, a girl, whom she planned to name Jordan Elizabeth. On October 8, Roucka and Schubenski got engaged in Paris, France. As part of the pregnancy, Roucka moved to Pittsburgh so that the baby could be closer to Schubenski's family. She gave birth to Jordan Elizabeth on February 13, 2016.

== Championships and accomplishments ==
- Florida Championship Wrestling
  - Queen of FCW (1 time)
- Ohio Valley Wrestling
  - OVW Women's Championship (1 time)
- Pro Wrestling Illustrated
  - Ranked No. 43 of the top 50 female wrestlers in the PWI Female 50 in 2008
- World Wrestling Entertainment
  - Slammy Award (1 time)
    - Best Use of Exercise Equipment (2010)
- Wrestling Observer Newsletter
  - Worst Worked Match of the Year (2013) with AJ Lee, Aksana, Alicia Fox, Kaitlyn, Summer Rae, and Tamina Snuka vs. Brie Bella, Cameron, Eva Marie, JoJo, Naomi, Natalya, and Nikki Bella on November 24
