= Tamina Snuka =

American professional wrestler (born 1978)

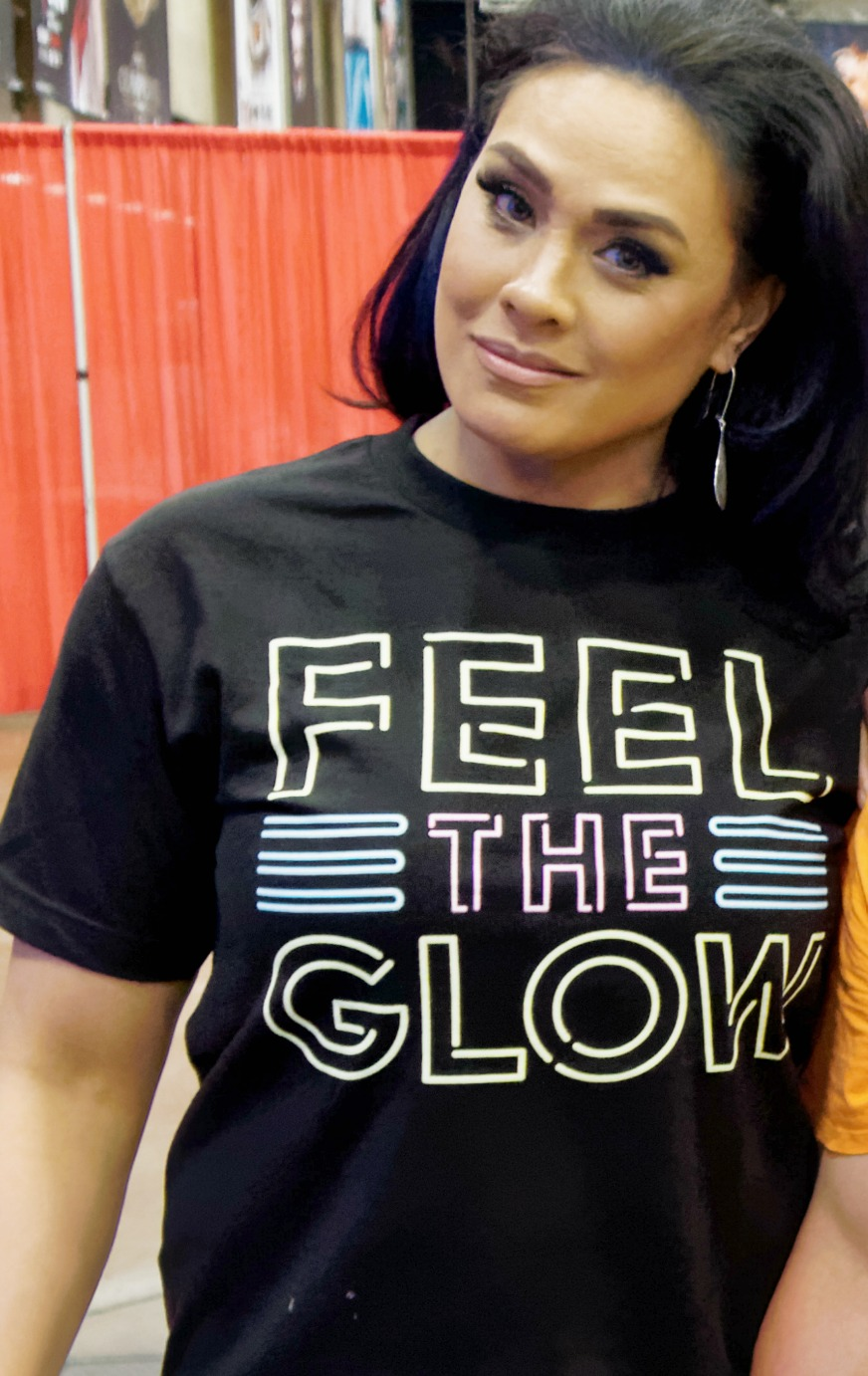
- Tamina in 2016

Personal information
- Born: Sarona Moana Marie Reiher Snuka; January 10, 1978 (age 48) Vancouver, Washington, U.S.
- Children: 2
- Relatives: Jimmy Snuka (father); Deuce (brother)
- Family: Anoaʻi

Professional wrestling career
- Ring name(s): Sarona Snuka; Tamina; Tamina Snuka
- Billed height: 5 ft 9 in (175 cm)
- Billed weight: 169 lb (77 kg)
- Billed from: The Pacific Islands
- Trained by: Wild Samoan Training Center; Florida Championship Wrestling; Steve Keirn
- Debut: September 26, 2009

Sarona Moana Marie Reiher Snuka-Polamalu (born January 10, 1978) is an American professional wrestler. She is signed to WWE where she performs under the ring name, Tamina.

The daughter of professional wrestler Jimmy Snuka, she began wrestling in 2009 and worked for World Xtreme Wrestling, and she signed a contract with WWE the following year. She is a former one-time WWE Women's Tag Team Champion (with Natalya) and a nine-time WWE 24/7 Champion.

== Professional wrestling career ==
=== Early career (2009–2010) ===
Snuka first became involved in professional wrestling after she received the first Lia Maivia Scholarship to train at the Wild Samoan Training Center in Minneola, Florida.

=== World Wrestling Entertainment/WWE ===
==== Various alliances (2010–2011) ====
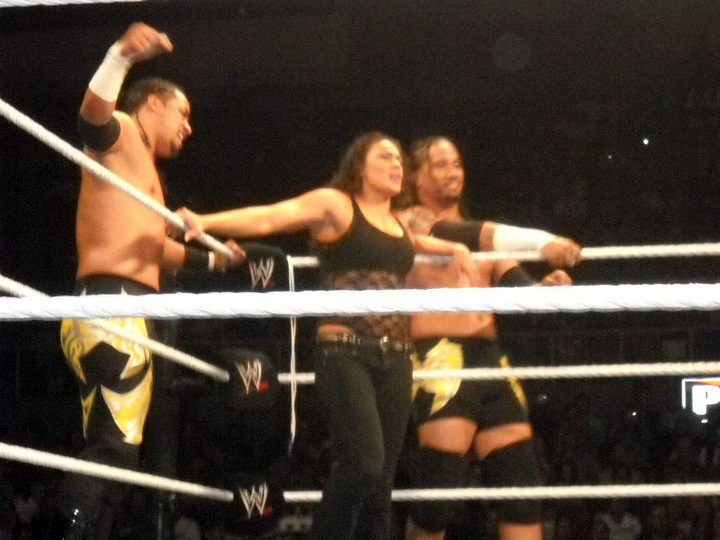
Snuka along with The Usos in 2010

On the May 24, 2010, episode of Raw, Snuka debuted as a villainous character, under the ring name Tamina, along with Jimmy and Jey Uso by attacking the Unified Tag Team Champions, The Hart Dynasty (David Hart Smith, Tyson Kidd, and Natalya). The next week on the May 31 episode of Raw, Tamina and The Usos introduced themselves and stated that the Hart Dynasty were in the "wrong place at the wrong time", before again brawling with the trio. On June 20 at Fatal 4-Way, Tamina and the Usos were defeated by the Hart Dynasty in a six-person mixed tag team match, after Natalya pinned Tamina. Two weeks later on the June 21 episode of Raw, Tamina made her singles debut against Natalya, but the match ended in a no contest after The Nexus interrupted the match. On the June 28 episode of Raw, Tamina and The Usos were scheduled to face The Hart Dynasty in another six-person mixed tag team match, but instead attacked them during their entrance, leading to Tamina throwing Natalya in the ring and executing the Superfly Splash on her. On August, Tamina turned face when she became the manager of the team of Santino Marella and Vladimir Kozlov. On the December 6 episode of Raw, Tamina and Marella began a relationship storyline.

==== Divas Championship pursuits (2011–2013) ====
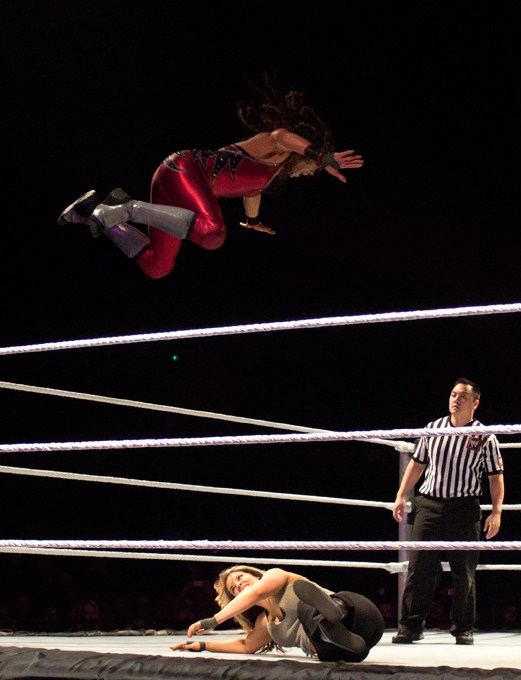
Snuka performing a "Superfly Splash" on Kaitlyn

On April 2, 2011, Tamina, alongside the entire roster of WWE Divas, inducted Sunny into the WWE Hall of Fame. After being drafted to the SmackDown brand as part of the 2011 supplemental draft, Tamina made her SmackDown debut as a villain on the May 27 episode of SmackDown, teaming with Alicia Fox to defeat the team of AJ and Kaitlyn. Tamina would then begin an on-screen relationship with JTG, becoming his valet.

After changing to face on the December 30 episode of SmackDown, and changing her name to Tamina Snuka, she wrestled for the WWE Divas title at Elimination Chamber pay-per-view, but was defeated by Beth Phoenix. On the August 20 episode of Raw, Snuka suffered a legitimate back injury. She returned three months later at the Survivor Series pay-per-view as a heel, interrupting a segment between AJ Lee and Vickie Guerrero by attacking AJ from behind. She at Elimination Chamber, Snuka unsuccessfully challenged Kaitlyn for the Divas Championship. On the June 5 episode of NXT, Snuka was defeated by Paige in the first round of the NXT Women's Championship tournament to crown the inaugural champion.

==== AJ Lee's bodyguard (2013–2014) ====
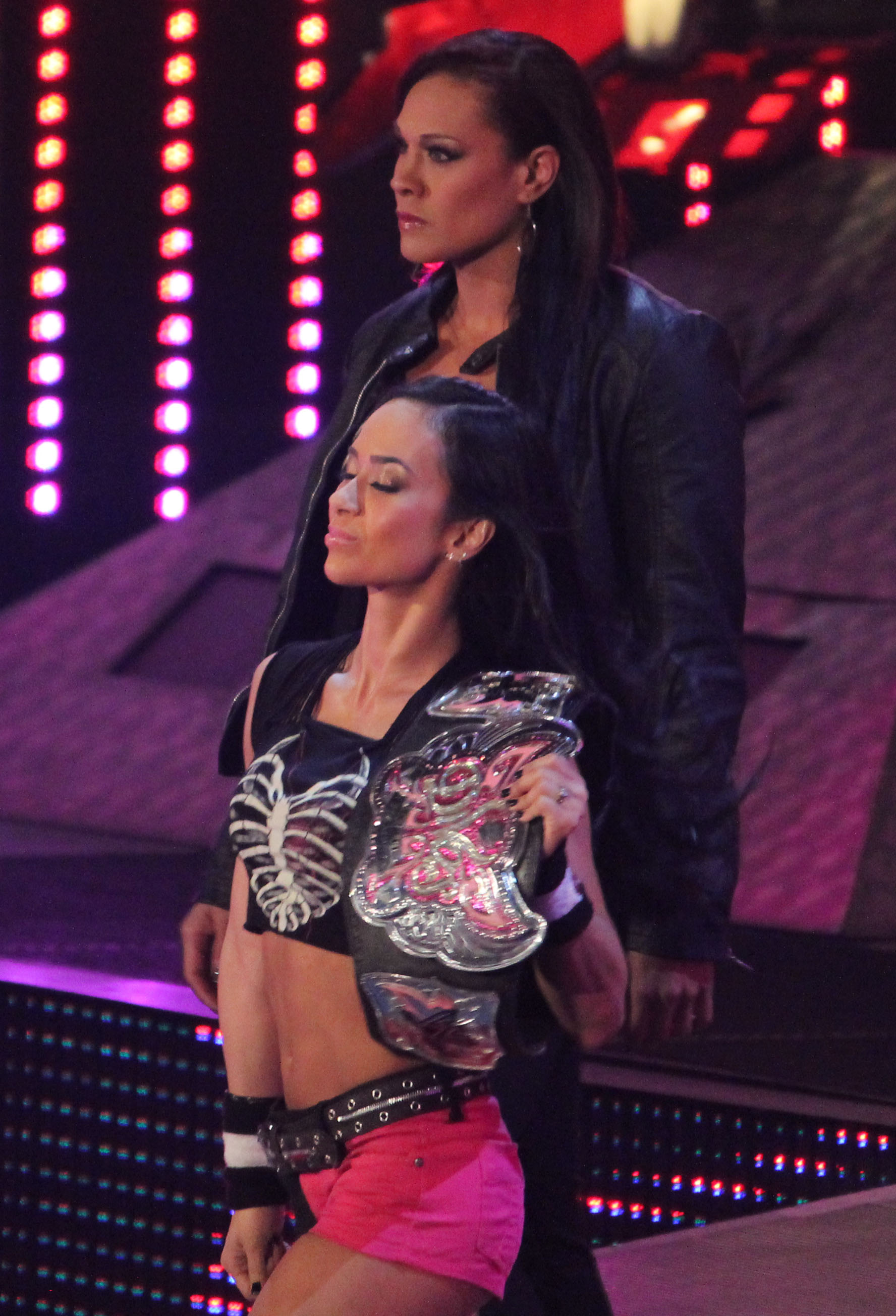
Snuka along with AJ Lee the night after WrestleMania on Raw in April 2014

Snuka returned to WWE programming in late September 2013, taking on the role as Divas Champion AJ Lee's bodyguard. Snuka helped AJ retain her title on several occasions. AJ went on to captain a team at Survivor Series in a seven-on-seven elimination tag team match against the cast of Total Divas, where Snuka was the penultimate eliminated.

On February 23, 2014, at the Elimination Chamber pay-per-view, Snuka accidentally superkicked AJ during her title match against Cameron, and eventually caused a disqualification when Cameron almost won the match. After Snuka left Lee, she wrestled for the title, participating in at WrestleMania XXX in the 14-Diva match, which was won by the defending champion AJ Lee, and against Paige at Extreme Rules, losing again.

==== Team B.A.D. (2015–2016) ====
Eleven months after having undergone surgery following a torn ACL on June 4, 2014, Snuka, billed simply as Tamina again, returned on the May 4, 2015, episode of Raw, allying herself with Naomi, as the two attacked The Bella Twins. Tamina and Naomi went on to defeat the Bella Twins in a tag team match at Payback. The following night on Raw, Tamina interfered in Naomi's Divas Championship match against Nikki Bella, causing a disqualification. After the match, Paige returned from injury and attacked Tamina, Naomi and Nikki. At The Beast in the East on July 4, Tamina failed to capture the Divas Championship from Nikki Bella in a triple threat match that also involved Paige.

On the July 13 episode of Raw, after weeks of being outnumbered by Team Bella (The Bella Twins and Alicia Fox), Stephanie McMahon called for a "revolution" in the Divas division and introduced the debuting NXT Women's Champion Sasha Banks as an ally to Tamina and Naomi. Charlotte and Becky Lynch would then debut and ally with Paige, leading to a brawl between the three teams. The trio of Tamina, Naomi and Banks was later dubbed Team B.A.D. (Beautiful and Dangerous). At Battleground, a triple threat match took place with Banks representing Team B.A.D., against Charlotte of PCB and Brie Bella for Team Bella in a losing effort, while Charlotte picked up victory. The three teams would ultimately face off at SummerSlam in a three team elimination match, where Team B.A.D. were the first team to be eliminated courtesy of Team Bella when Tamina was pinned by Brie, and PCB would win the match.

On the February 1, 2016, episode of Raw, Tamina and Naomi attacked Banks after the latter announced her departure from team B.A.D. The feud between Tamina and Naomi and Banks would continue throughout February, and would lead to a tag team match at Fastlane, where Tamina and Naomi lost to Banks and her partner Becky Lynch. In late March, Tamina and Naomi allied with Lana, Emma and Summer Rae, leading to a 10-Diva tag team match on the WrestleMania 32 pre-show, which Tamina's team lost. In early May, Tamina underwent knee surgery in order to repair torn ligaments, while Naomi also claimed to be injured on May 5, due to a torn ankle tendon, thus disbanding the team. After having been undrafted in the 2016 WWE draft due to her injury, it was reported in December that Tamina was cleared for in-ring competition.

==== Alliance with Lana (2017–2018) ====
On February 18, 2017, Snuka made her in-ring return in a tag-team match at a SmackDown live event, where she and Natalya scored a victory over Alexa Bliss and Carmella. She made her televised return on the April 11 episode of SmackDown Live, where she was established as a member of the SmackDown brand as part of the "Superstar Shake Up". On the April 25 episode of SmackDown, Tamina interfered in a title match between Charlotte Flair and Naomi alongside Natalya and Carmella. On May 21 at Backlash, Tamina competed in a six-woman tag team match alongside Carmella and Natalya, where the three emerged victorious over Flair, Naomi, and Becky Lynch. On June 18 at Money in the Bank, Snuka competed in the inaugural women's Money in the Bank ladder match, which was won by Carmella following an interference by James Ellsworth. On the June 20 episode of SmackDown, Carmella was stripped from the briefcase by SmackDown's general manager, Daniel Bryan, and a rematch took place on the June 27 episode's main event, in which Tamina failed again and Carmella was victorious.

On the July 4 episode of Smackdown, Tamina comforted Lana after her championship loss, teasing an alliance between the two. Lana later became her manager. On July 23 at Battleground, Snuka unsuccessfully competed in a five-way elimination match to determine the number one contender for the SmackDown Women's Championship after she was eliminated by Becky Lynch. On the September 19 episode of SmackDown, Snuka participated in a fatal four-way match to determine the number one contender for Natalya's SmackDown Women's Championship against Becky Lynch, Naomi and the returning Charlotte Flair, which was won by Flair. On November 19 at Survivor Series, Tamina represented Team SmackDown in a ten-woman elimination tag team match against Team Raw, losing the match but scoring an elimination over Bayley. On January 28, 2018, at Royal Rumble, Tamina entered at number 7 during the first women's Royal Rumble match, in which she was eliminated by Lita. Shortly thereafter, Tamina would go on hiatus due to a torn rotator cuff and underwent a successful surgery. This ended her partnership with Lana.

==== Teaming with Nia Jax (2018–2019) ====
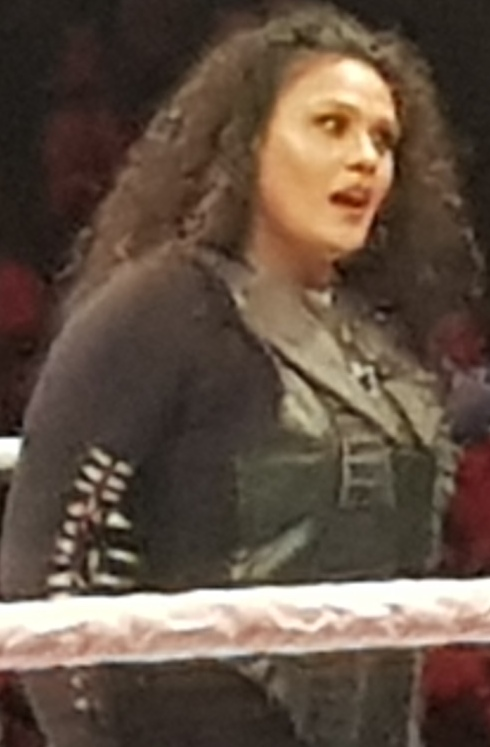
Snuka in 2019

On the October 15, 2018, episode of Raw, after nine months of inactivity due to various injuries, Tamina made a surprising return, working again as a heel. Shortly after her return, Tamina started an alliance with Nia Jax. The duo wrestled for the WWE Women's Tag Team Championship at Elimination Chamber, Fastlane, and WrestleMania 35 but didn't win the titles. Afterwards, Tamina and Jax would stop appearing on Raw after Jax underwent surgery for knee injuries.

At Hell in a Cell, Tamina defeated Carmella in a backstage segment, winning the 24/7 Championship, the first championship of her wrestling career. She later lost the championship to R-Truth later on in the night. As part of the 2019 draft, Tamina was drafted to SmackDown.

==== Teaming with Natalya (2020–2021) ====
At the Royal Rumble event on January 26, 2020, Tamina competed in the women's Royal Rumble match, entering at number 14, lasting less than a minute before being eliminated by Bianca Belair. On the March 20 episode of SmackDown, Tamina was announced as a participant in a Fatal 5-Way elimination match for Bayley's SmackDown Women's Championship at WrestleMania 36. At WrestleMania 36, Tamina was the first woman eliminated after the four other competitors pinned her at once. Tamina demanded a title match against Bayley on the April 10 episode of SmackDown, which Bayley accepted if Tamina could defeat Sasha Banks the following week, which Tamina did. At the Money in the Bank event, Tamina failed to win the title. On the August 14 episode of SmackDown, Tamina competed in a triple brand battle royal to earn a WWE SmackDown Women's Championship match at SummerSlam, which was won by Asuka. On the October 12 episode of Raw, Tamina competed in another battle royal to earn a match for the Raw Women's Championship, which was won by Lana.

At the beginning of January 2021, Tamina formed an alliance with Natalya while "putting the women's tag team division on notice". At the Royal Rumble event on January 31, 2021, Tamina competed in the women's Royal Rumble match, but was eliminated by Nia Jax and Shayna Baszler. At WrestleMania 37 night 1, Tamina and Natalya won a tag team turmoil match to earn an opportunity at the WWE Women's Tag Team Championship, and the following night, they were unsuccessful. The two would continue feuding with Jax and Baszler, defeating them on the May 14 episode of SmackDown to win the WWE Women's Tag Team Championship, which they proceeded to lose to Rhea Ripley and Nikki Cross. At the Money in the Bank event, both women entered the Women's Money in the Bank ladder match, but would be unsuccessful in winning the briefcase as it was won by Nikki A.S.H. As part of the 2021 Draft, Tamina was drafted to the Raw brand while Natalya remained on the SmackDown brand, ending the team.

==== 24/7 Champion and hiatus (2022–present) ====
On the January 3 episode of Raw, Tamina failed to win the WWE 24/7 Championship from Dana Brooke in a mixed tag team match also involving Reggie and Akira Tozawa. Tamina, Tozawa, and R-Truth then spent months trying unsuccessfully to win the title from Reggie and later Dana Brooke in various backstage segments. Tamina would however win the title on the April 18 edition of Raw, during a double wedding ceremony, losing it to her partner, Tozawa after.

After having an ongoing feud with Brooke for the 24/7 Championship, the two began to team together. In August, Tamina and Brooke entered a tournament for the vacant Women's Tag Team Championship. Tamina and Brooke lost in the first round against Dakota Kai and Iyo Sky. Due to an injury from Gigi Dolin after her and Jacy Jayne won round 1 against Natalya and Sonya Deville, it was announced on the August 22 episode of Raw that Tamina and Dana Brooke would be participating in a "Second Chance Fatal Four Way" to re-enter the Women's Tag Team Tournament on the August 26 episode of SmackDown, in which they lost. Tamina entered at #19 in the 2023 Women’s Royal Rumble, she lasted just under 12 minutes before being eliminated by Michelle McCool. Tamina was used sporadically on Main Event tapings in early 2023, losing to Michin on the March 3 taping in what would be Tamina's final appearance in WWE to date. She was removed from WWE's active roster in July 2024, but remains signed to the company.

== Other media ==
Snuka has appeared in nine WWE console games. She made her in-game debut in WWE 2K15 and appears in WWE 2K16 WWE 2K17, WWE 2K18, WWE 2K19, WWE 2K20, WWE 2K22, WWE 2K23, WWE 2K24 and WWE 2K25.

== Personal life ==
Snuka is of Samoan and Fijian descent. She is the second daughter of Jimmy Snuka from his second wife, Sharon Snuka. Through her mother, Snuka is part of the Anoaʻi wrestling family. Sarona has an older sister named Liana and younger maternal sister Ata. She is also the sister of former WWE wrestler Jimmy Snuka, Jr. (ring name Deuce).

== Filmography ==
Film
Year	Film	Role	Notes
2014	Hercules		Cameo
Television
Year	Title	Role	Notes
2014–2019	Total Divas	Herself	Guest (seasons 2, 5–9); Recurring (season 4): 15 episodes
2015	WWE Tough Enough	Herself	Guest (season 6)
2016	WWE 24	Herself	Episode: “Women’s Evolution”
2017-2020	WWE Game Night	Herself	2 episodes

== Championships and accomplishments ==
- Pro Wrestling Illustrated
  - Ranked No. 19 of the top 50 female wrestlers in the PWI Female 50 in 2012
  - Ranked No. 28 of the top 50 Tag Teams in the PWI Tag Team 50 in 2021 with Natalya
- Wrestling Observer Newsletter
  - Worst Feud of the Year (2015) Team PCB vs. Team B.A.D. vs. Team Bella
  - Worst Worked Match of the Year (2013) with AJ Lee, Aksana, Alicia Fox, Kaitlyn, Rosa Mendes, and Summer Rae vs. Brie Bella, Cameron, Eva Marie, JoJo, Naomi, Natalya, and Nikki Bella on November 24
- WWE
  - WWE 24/7 Championship (9 times)
  - WWE Women's Tag Team Championship (1 time) – with Natalya
