= Total Divas season 3 =

Season of American television series Total Divas

Total Divas
- Season 3
- Starring: Brie Bella; Cameron; Eva Marie; Naomi; Natalya; Nikki Bella; Summer Rae; Rosa Mendes; Alicia Fox; Paige
- No. of episodes: 20

Release
- Original network: E!
- Original release: September 7, 2014 – March 8, 2015

Season chronology
- ← Previous; Season 2 Next → Season 4

Total Divas is an American reality television series that premiered on July 28, 2013, on E!. The series gave viewers an inside look of the lives of WWE Divas from their work within WWE to their personal lives. Behind the scene footage of the Divas is also included. Season 2 ended on June 1, 2014 with 1.54 million viewers.

== Production ==
The series gives viewers an inside look of the lives of WWE Divas from their work within WWE to their personal lives. Behind the scene footage of the Divas is also included. On May 19, 2014, E! announced that the third season of Total Divas will premiere on September 7, 2014, with Rosa Mendes joining the cast. Unlike other WWE programs, most of the performers use their real names instead of their ring names, leading to Cameron, Naomi, Natalya, Jimmy Uso, and Tyson Kidd being referred to as Ariane, Trinity, Nattie, Jon, and TJ respectively.

== Cast ==
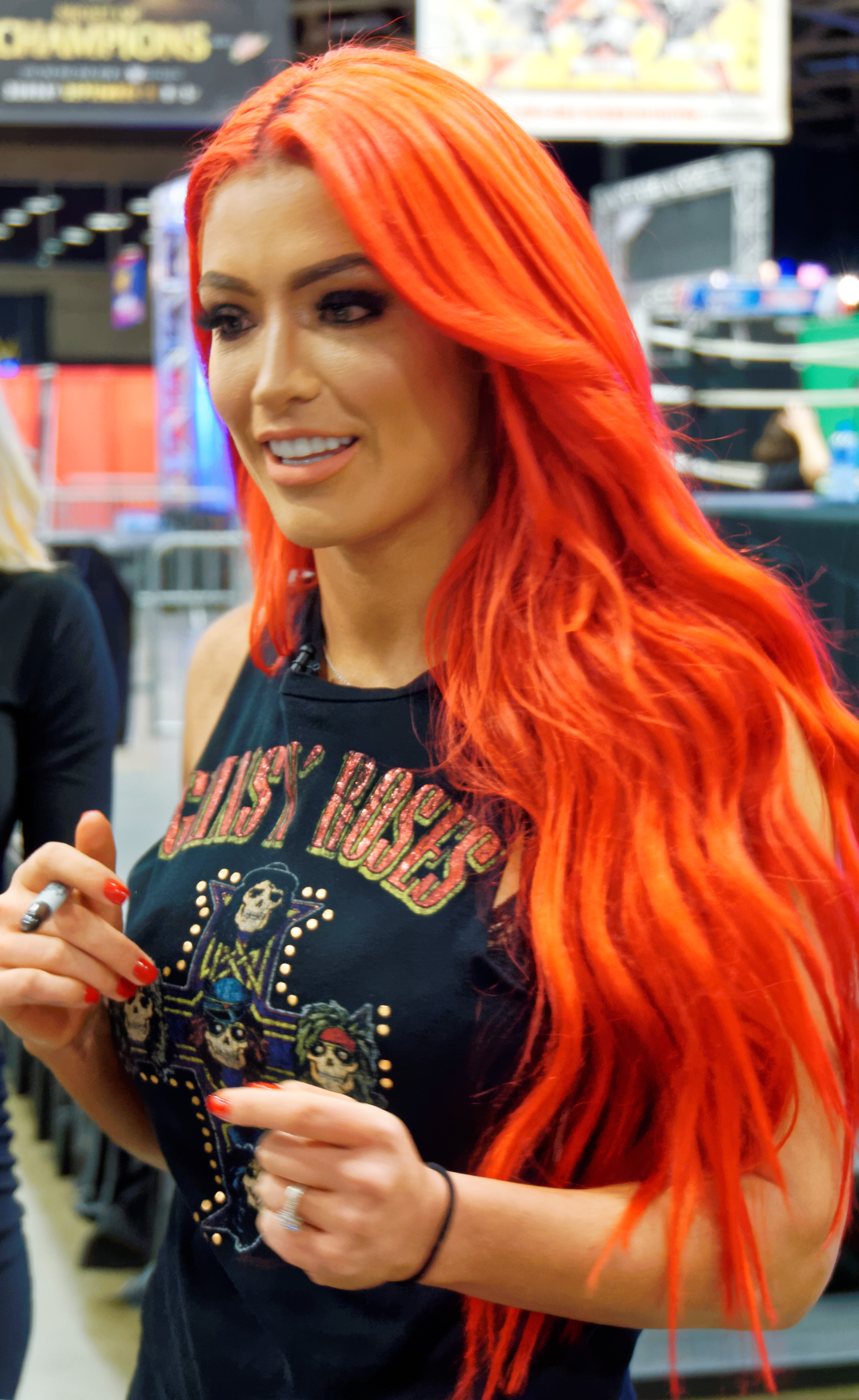
Eva Marie at WrestleMania Axxess in 2016.

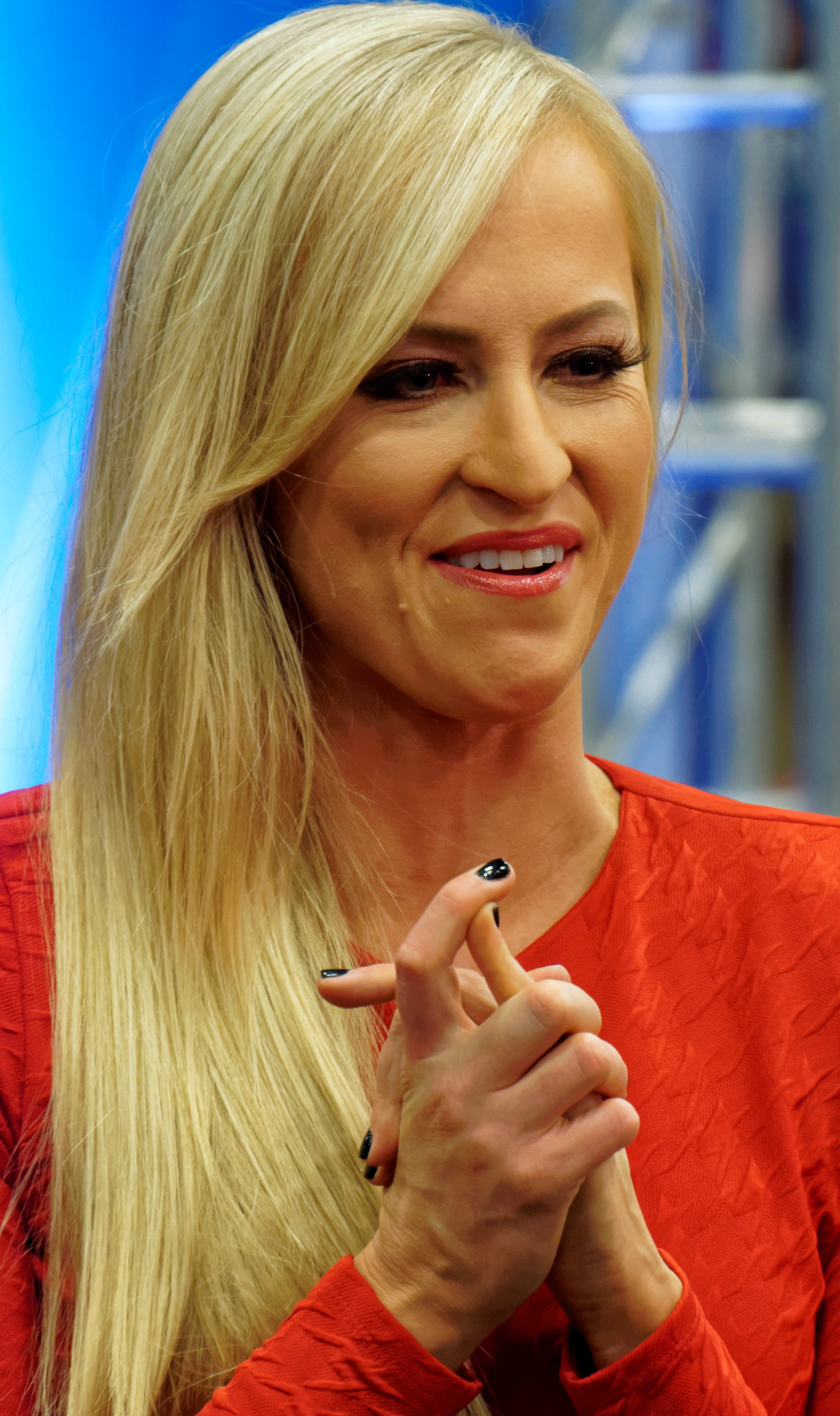
Summer Rae; who joined the cast of Total Divas in season 2.

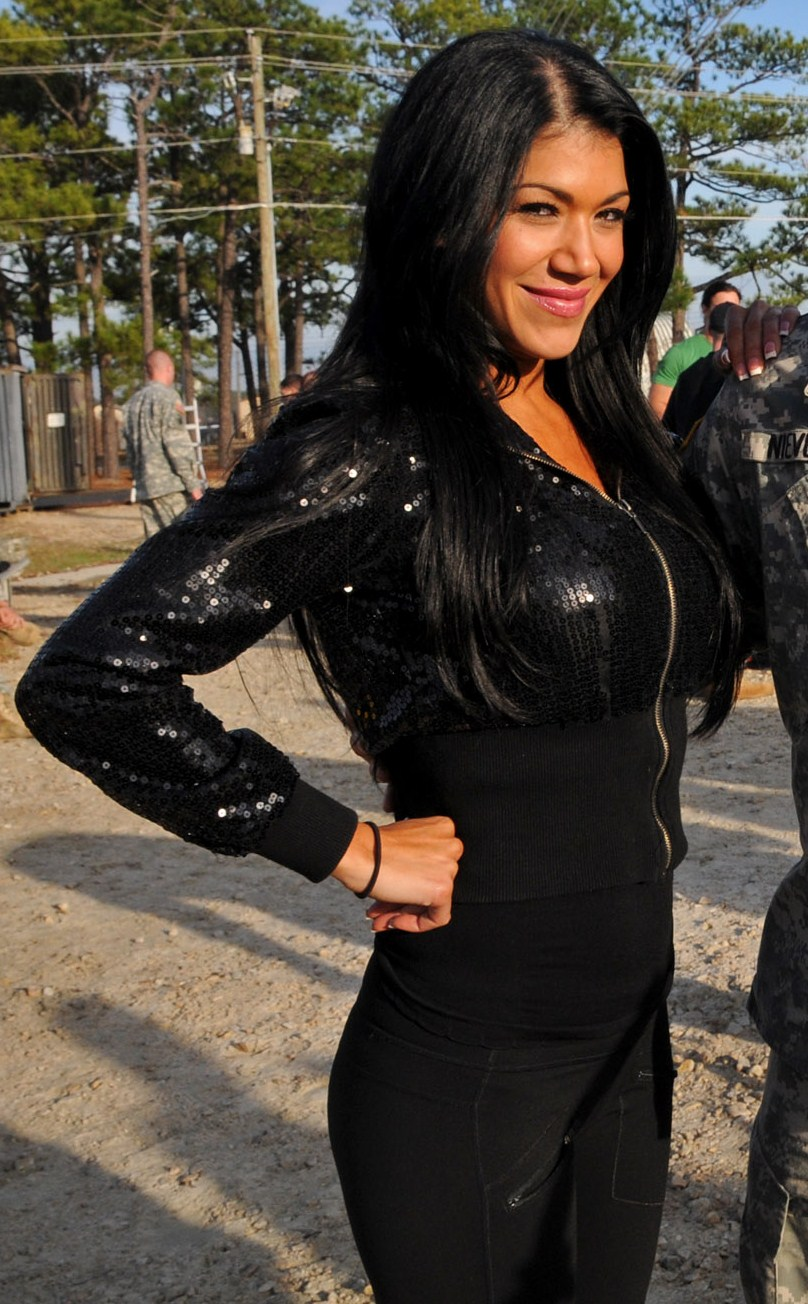
Rosa Mendes; who joined the cast of Total Divas in season 3.

=== Main cast ===
- Brie Bella (Brianna Danielson)
- Cameron (Ariane Andrew)
- Eva Marie (Natalie Marie Coyle)
- Naomi (Trinity Fatu)
- Natalya (Natalie Neidhart-Wilson)
- Nikki Bella (Stephanie Garcia-Colace)
- Summer Rae (Danielle Moinet)
- Rosa Mendes (Milena Roucka)
- Alicia Fox (Victoria Crawford)
- Paige (Saraya-Jade Bevis)

=== Recurring cast ===
- Daniel Bryan (Brie's husband)
- Vincent Isayan (Cameron's boyfriend)
- Jonathan Coyle (Eva Marie's husband)
- Tyson Kidd (Natalya's husband)
- John Cena (Nikki's fiancé)
- Mark Carrano (WWE Senior Director of Talent Relations)
- Kathy Colace (Brie & Nikki's mother)
- J.J. Garcia (Brie & Nikki's brother)

=== Guest stars ===
- JoJo (Joseann Offerman)
- Big E (Ettore Ewen)
- Dolph Ziggler (Nicholas "Nick" Nemeth)
- Emma (Tenille Dashwood)
- Jimmy Uso (Naomi's husband)
- Sandra Gray (WWE's seamstress)
- Jim Neidhart (Nattie's father)
- Ellie Neidhart (Nattie's mother)

== Episodes ==
No. overall	No. in season	Title	Original release date	Prod. code	U.S. viewers (millions)
26	1	"Eggs Over Freezing"	September 7, 2014	301	1.20
27	2	"Mo' Marriage, Mo' Problems"	September 14, 2014	302	0.97
28	3	"Roadside Rumble"	September 21, 2014	303	1.18
29	4	"Divas Unchained"	September 28, 2014	304	0.99
30	5	"Scared Straight"	October 5, 2014	305	1.05
31	6	"Paint the Island Red"	October 12, 2014	306	0.88
32	7	"The Double-Cross"	October 19, 2014	307	0.97
33	8	"Cross Country Catastrophe"	October 26, 2014	308	0.86
34	9	"Daddy's Little Girl"	November 2, 2014	309	0.83
35	10	"The Divas Are Taking Over"	November 9, 2014	310	1.13
36	11	"Her Highness"	November 16, 2014	311	1.41
37	12	"Baby Not On Board"	November 23, 2014	312	1.30
38	13	"Twin Leaks"	November 30, 2014	313	1.25
39	14	"Insecurity Breach"	December 7, 2014	314	1.25
40	15	"Girl vs. Girl Bye"	December 14, 2014	315	1.08
41	16	"All Hail Brie Mode"	December 21, 2014	316	0.91
42	17	"Mo' Money, Mo' Purses"	January 4, 2015	317	1.06
43	18	"Model Behavior"	January 11, 2015	318	1.40
44	19	"Indecent Exposure"	January 18, 2015	319	1.21
45	20	"The New Divas Champion"	January 25, 2015	320	1.28

== Ratings ==
No.	Title	Original Air date	Viewership (millions) (Live+SD)	Rating/share (18–49) (Live+SD)	Rank per week on Cable
1	"Eggs Over Freezing"	September 7, 2014	1.20	0.6	—N/a
2	"Mo' Marriage, Mo' Problems"	September 14, 2014	0.97	—N/a	—N/a
3	"Roadside Rumble"	September 21, 2014	1.18	0.6	—N/a
4	"Divas Unchained"	September 28, 2014	0.99	—N/a	—N/a
5	"Scared Straight"	October 5, 2014	1.05	0.6	—N/a
6	"Paint the Island Red"	October 12, 2014	0.88	0.4	—N/a
7	"The Double-Cross"	October 12, 2014	0.97	0.5	—N/a
8	"Cross Country Catastrophe"	October 19, 2014	0.86	0.4	—N/a
9	"Daddy's Little Girl"	October 19, 2014	0.83	0.4	—N/a
10	"The Divas Are Taking Over"	October 26, 2014	1.13	—N/a	—N/a
11	"Her Highness"	January 4, 2015	1.41	0.7	—N/a
12	"Baby Not On Board"	January 11, 2015	1.30	—N/a	—N/a
13	"Twin Leaks"	January 18, 2015	1.25	0.6	—N/a
14	"Insecurity Breach"	January 25, 2015	1.25	—N/a	—N/a
15	"Girl vs. Girl Bye"	February 8, 2015	1.08	0.5	—N/a
16	"All Hail Brie Mode"	February 15, 2015	0.91	0.5	—N/a
17	"Mo' Money, Mo' Purses"	February 23, 2015	1.06	0.5	—N/a
18	"Model Behavior"	March 1, 2015	1.40	0.7	—N/a
19	"Indecent Exposure"	March 8, 2015	1.21	0.6	—N/a
20	"The New Divas Champion"	March 8, 2015	1.28	0.5	—N/a
