= Total Divas season 2 =

Season of American television series Total Divas

Total Divas
- Season 2
- Starring: Brie Bella; Cameron; Eva Marie; Naomi; Natalya; Nikki Bella; Summer Rae
- No. of episodes: 11

Release
- Original network: E!
- Original release: March 16 – June 1, 2014

Season chronology
- ← Previous; Season 1 Next → Season 3

Total Divas is an American reality television series that premiered on July 28, 2013, on E!. The series gave viewers an inside look of the lives of WWE Divas from their work within WWE to their personal lives. Behind the scene footage of the Divas is also included. Season 1 ended on December 15, 2013 with 1.29 million viewers.

== Production ==
WWE announcer Josh Mathews revealed on November 20, 2013, that Total Divas had been renewed for a second season. Season 2 premiered on March 16, 2014, with Summer Rae joining the cast. Unlike other WWE programs, most of the performers use their real names instead of their ring names, leading to Cameron, Naomi, Natalya, Jimmy Uso, and Tyson Kidd being referred to as Ariane, Trinity, Nattie, Jon, and TJ respectively.

== Cast ==
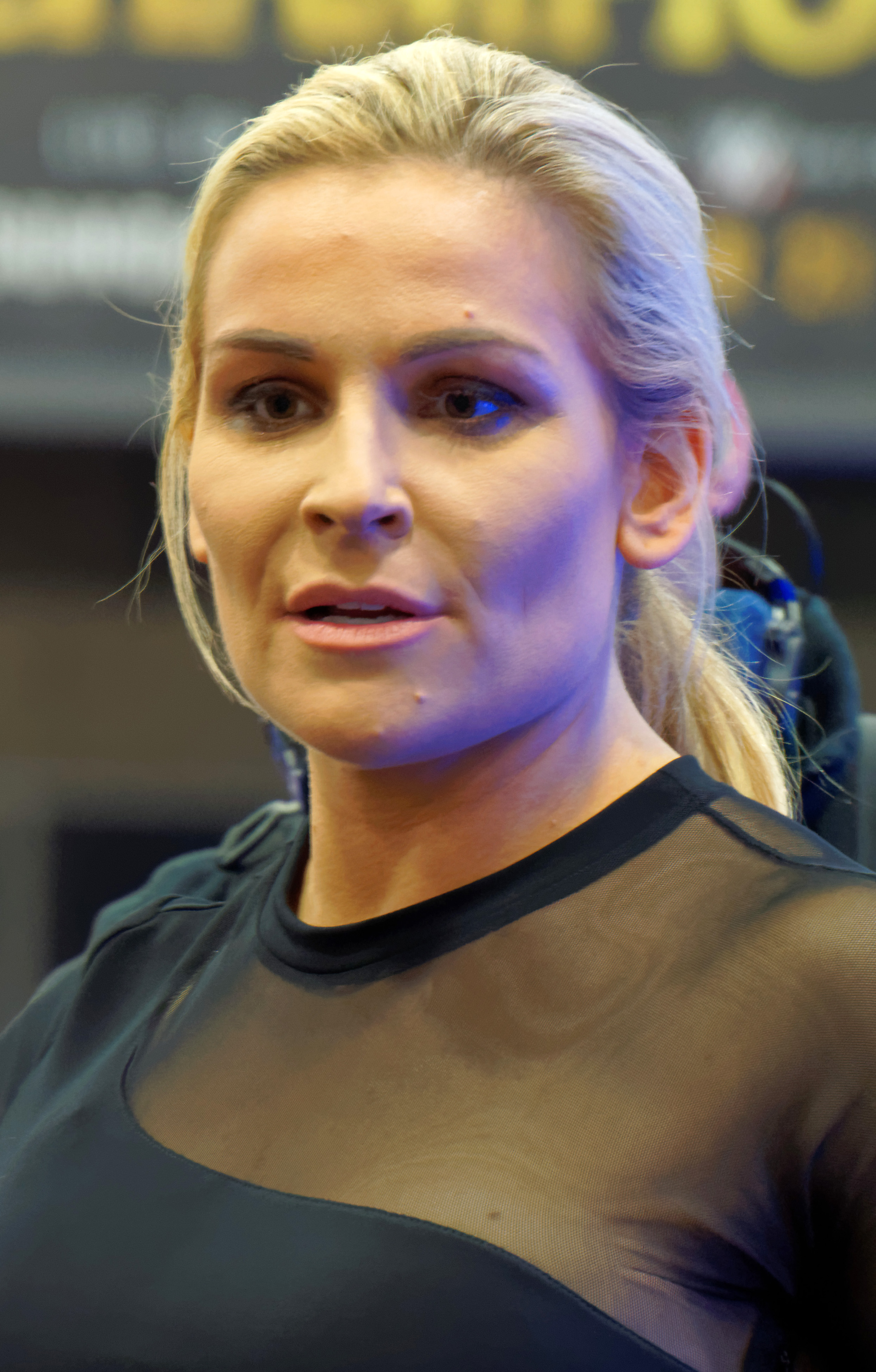
Nattie at WrestleMania Axxess, 2016.

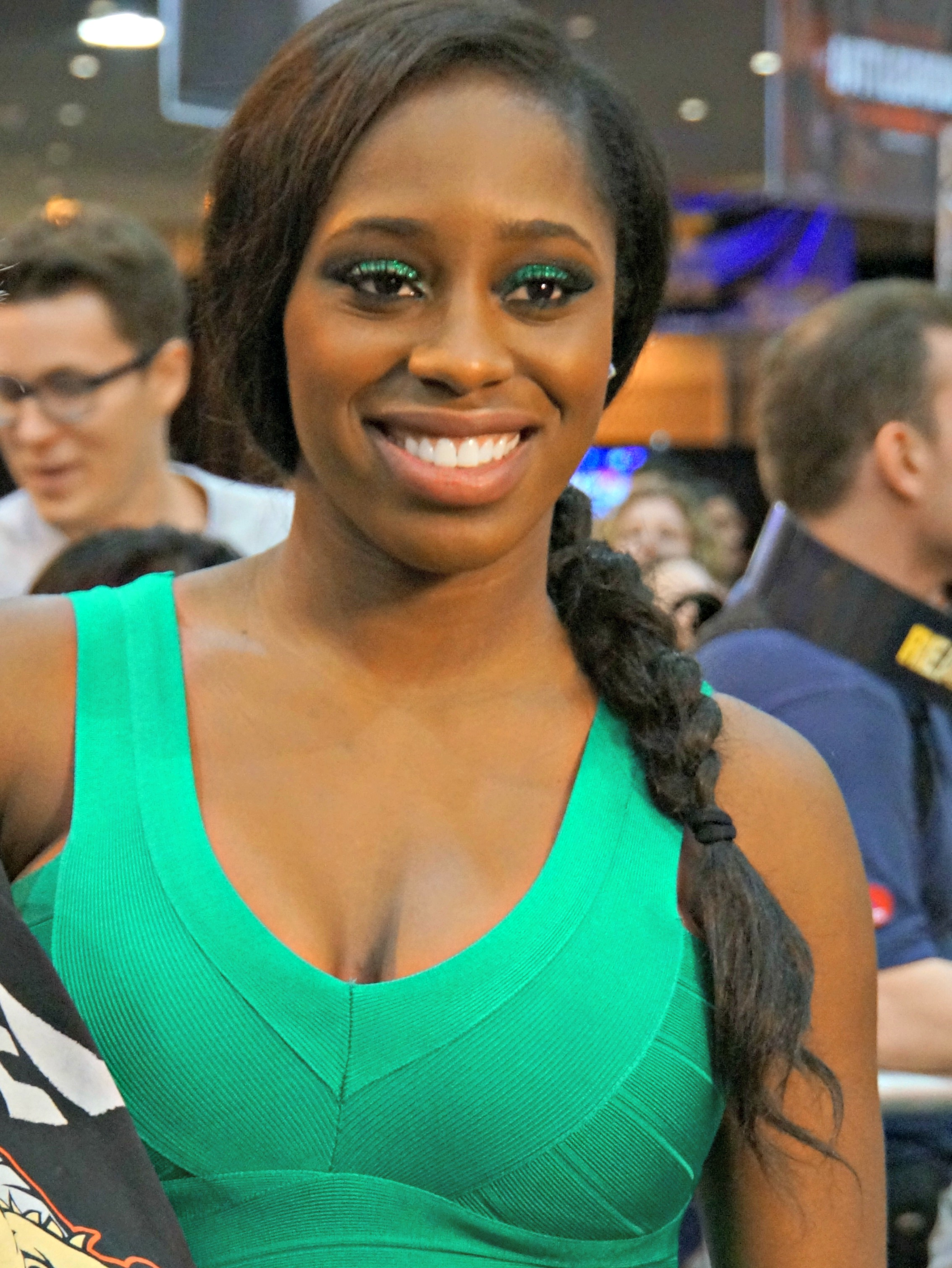
Naomi (Trinity) at WrestleMania Axxess, 2014.

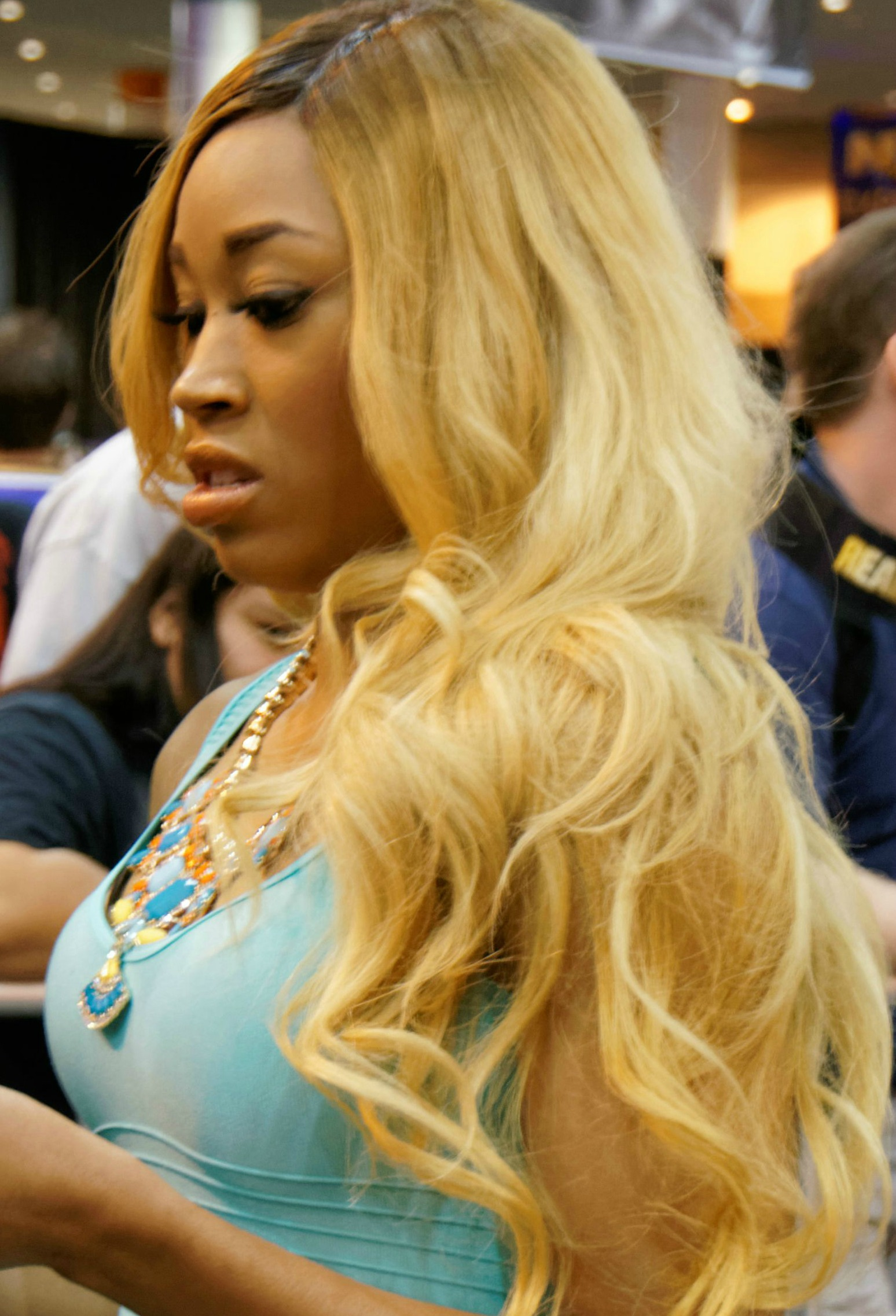
Cameron (Ariane) at WrestleMania Axxess, 2014.

=== Main cast ===
- Brie Bella (Brianna Danielson)
- Cameron (Ariane Andrew)
- Eva Marie (Natalie Marie Coyle)
- Naomi (Trinity Fatu)
- Natalya (Natalie Neidhart-Wilson)
- Nikki Bella (Stephanie Garcia-Colace)
- Summer Rae (Danielle Moinet)

=== Recurring cast ===
- Daniel Bryan (Brie's husband)
- Vincent Isayan (Cameron's boyfriend)
- Jonathan Coyle (Eva Marie's husband)
- Jimmy Uso (Naomi's husband)
- Tyson Kidd (Natalya's husband)
- John Cena (Nikki's boyfriend)
- Mark Carrano (WWE Senior Director of Talent Relations)
- Sandra Gray (WWE's seamstress)

=== Guest stars ===
- Alicia Fox (Victoria Crawford)
- Dolph Ziggler (Nicholas "Nick" Nemeth)
- Rosa Mendes (Milena Roucka)
- Tamina Snuka (Sarona Snuka-Polamalu)
- Kathy Colace (Brie & Nikki's mother)
- J.J. Garcia (Brie & Nikki's brother)

== Episodes ==
No. overall	No. in season	Title	Original release date	Prod. code	U.S. viewers (millions)
15	1	"New Diva on the Block" "Without John"^{1}	March 16, 2014	201	1.07
16	2	"The Braniel Bus"	March 23, 2014	202	1.28
17	3	"On Brie's Bad Side"	March 30, 2014	203	1.55
18	4	"Inhale, Exhale"	April 13, 2014	204	1.16
19	5	"For Better or For Worse"	April 20, 2014	205	1.39
20	6	"The House Sitters"	April 27, 2014	206	1.14
21	7	"Flirting With Fandango"	May 4, 2014	207	0.96
22	8	"Red and Gold"	May 11, 2014	208	0.75
23	9	"What Happens In Cabo"	May 18, 2014	209	1.31
24	10	"Digging A Hole"	May 25, 2014	210	1.04
25	11	"Wedding Mania"	June 1, 2014	211	1.54

Notes

1. "New Diva On The Block" was renamed "Without John" when it was added to the WWE Network.

== Ratings ==
No.	Title	Original Air date	Viewership (millions) (Live+SD)	Rating/share (18–49) (Live+SD)	Rank per week on Cable
1	"New Diva On The Block" "Without John"	March 16, 2014	1.07	0.5	—N/a
2	"The Braniel Bus"	March 23, 2014	1.28	0.6	—N/a
3	"On Brie's Bad Side"	March 30, 2014	1.55	—N/a	—N/a
4	"Inhale, Exhale"	April 13, 2014	1.16	0.5	—N/a
5	"For Better or For Worse"	April 20, 2014	1.39	0.6	—N/a
6	"The House Sitters"	April 27, 2014	1.14	0.6	—N/a
7	"Flirting With Fandango"	May 4, 2014	0.96	0.5	—N/a
8	"Red and Gold"	May 11, 2014	0.75	0.3	—N/a
9	"What Happens In Cabo"	May 18, 2014	1.31	0.6	—N/a
10	"Digging A Hole"	May 25, 2014	1.04	0.5	—N/a
11	"Wedding Mania"	June 1, 2014	1.54	0.8	—N/a
