= Total Divas season 1 =

Season of American television series Total Divas

Total Divas
- Season 1
- Starring: Brie Bella; Nikki Bella; Cameron; Naomi; Natalya; Eva Marie; JoJo
- No. of episodes: 14

Release
- Original network: E!
- Original release: July 28 – December 15, 2013

Season chronology
- Next → Season 2

Total Divas is an American reality television series that premiered on July 28, 2013, on E!. The series gave viewers an inside look of the lives of WWE Divas from their work within WWE to their personal lives. Behind the scene footage of the Divas is also included.

== Production ==
Total Divas was revealed in May 2013 as a part of a partnership with E!. It was announced on August 14, 2013, that E! had ordered an additional six episodes, bring the first season to a total of 14 episodes. The summer finale aired on September 15, 2013, with the season continuing on November 10, 2013. WWE announcer Josh Mathews revealed on November 20, 2013, that Total Divas had been renewed for a second season. Unlike other WWE programs, most of the performers use their real names instead of their ring names, leading to Cameron, Naomi, Natalya, Jimmy Uso, and Tyson Kidd being referred to as Ariane, Trinity, Nattie, Jon, and TJ respectively.

== Cast ==
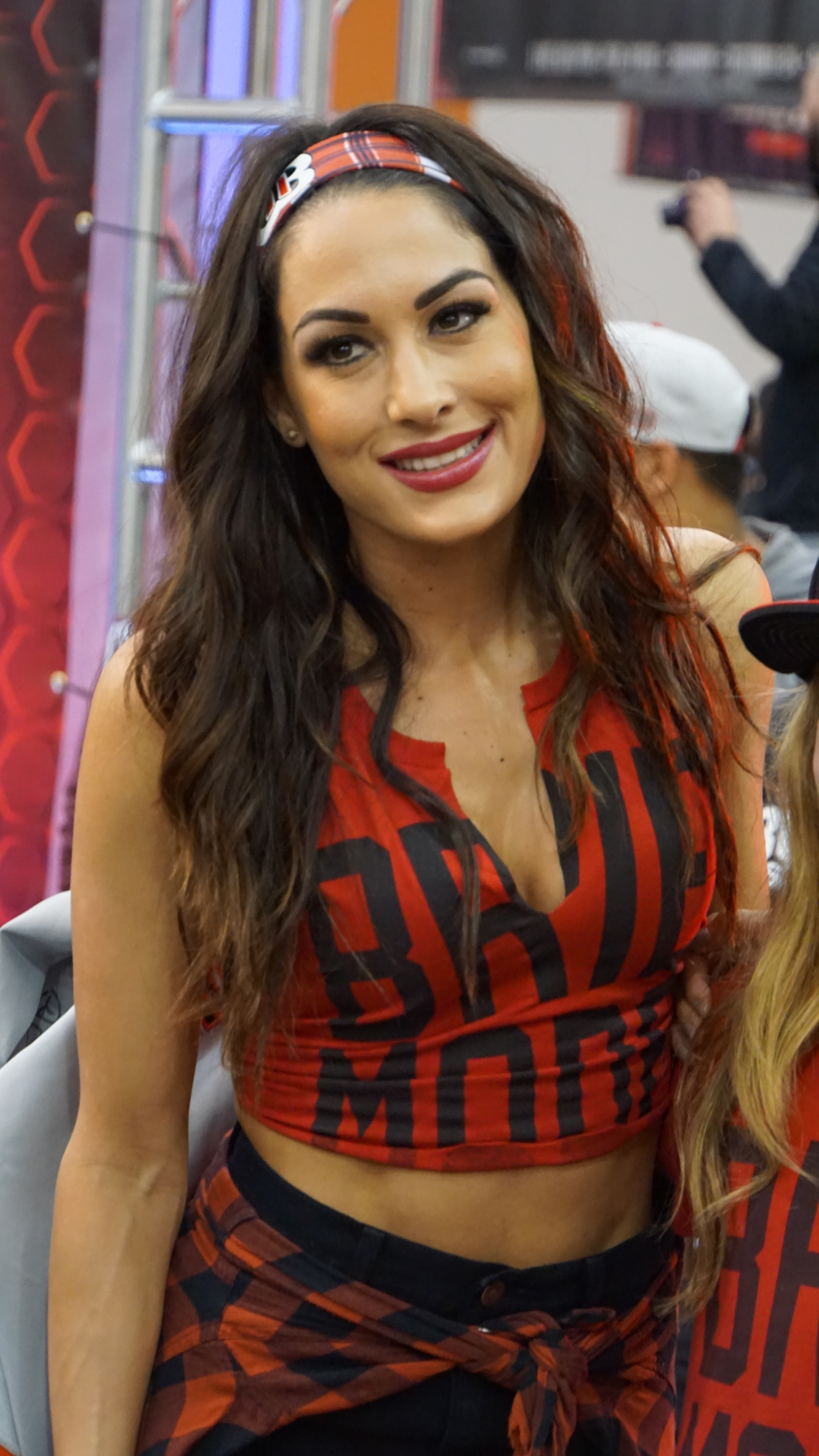
Brie Bella at WrestleMania Axxess, 2015.

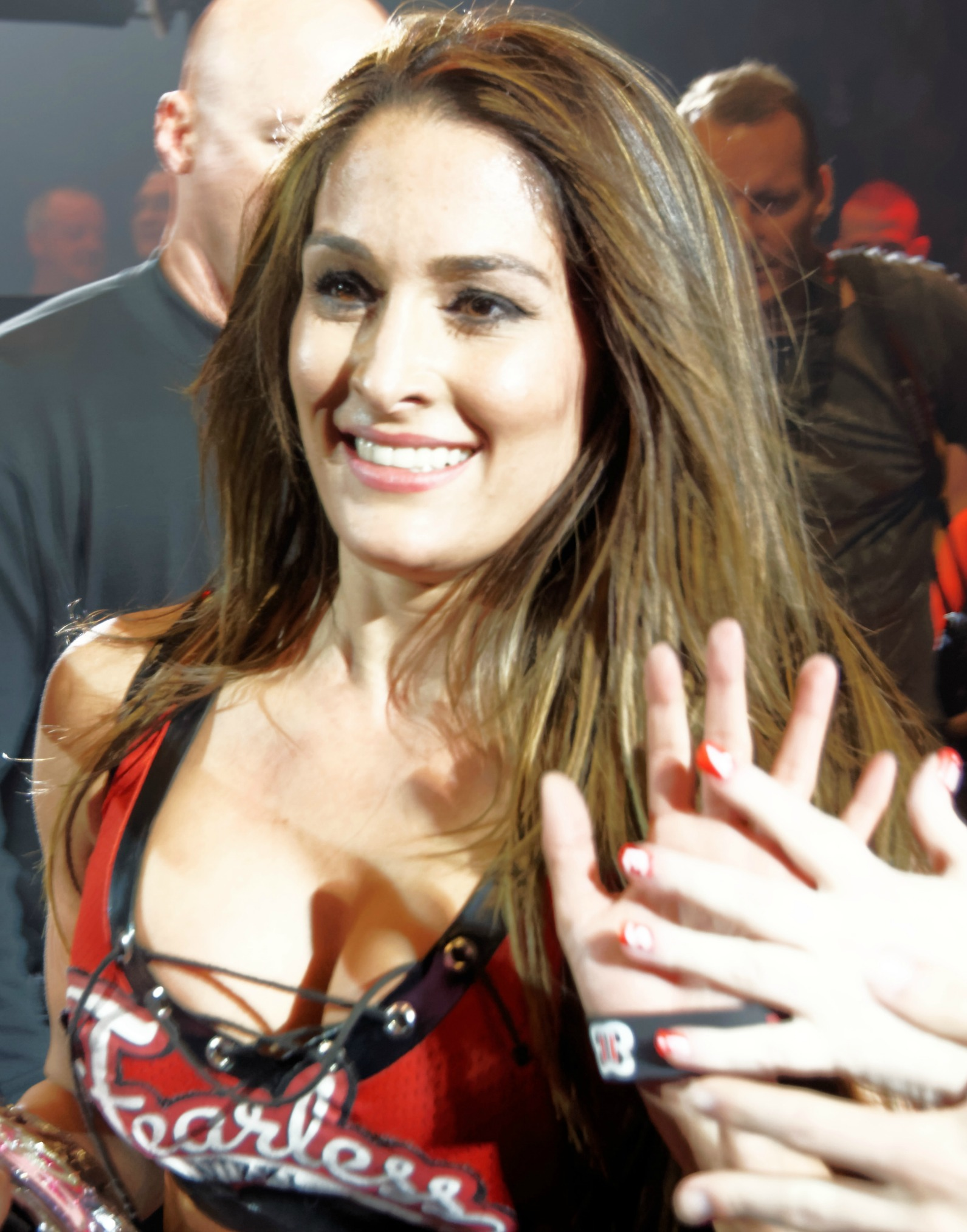
Nikki Bella at a Live Event.

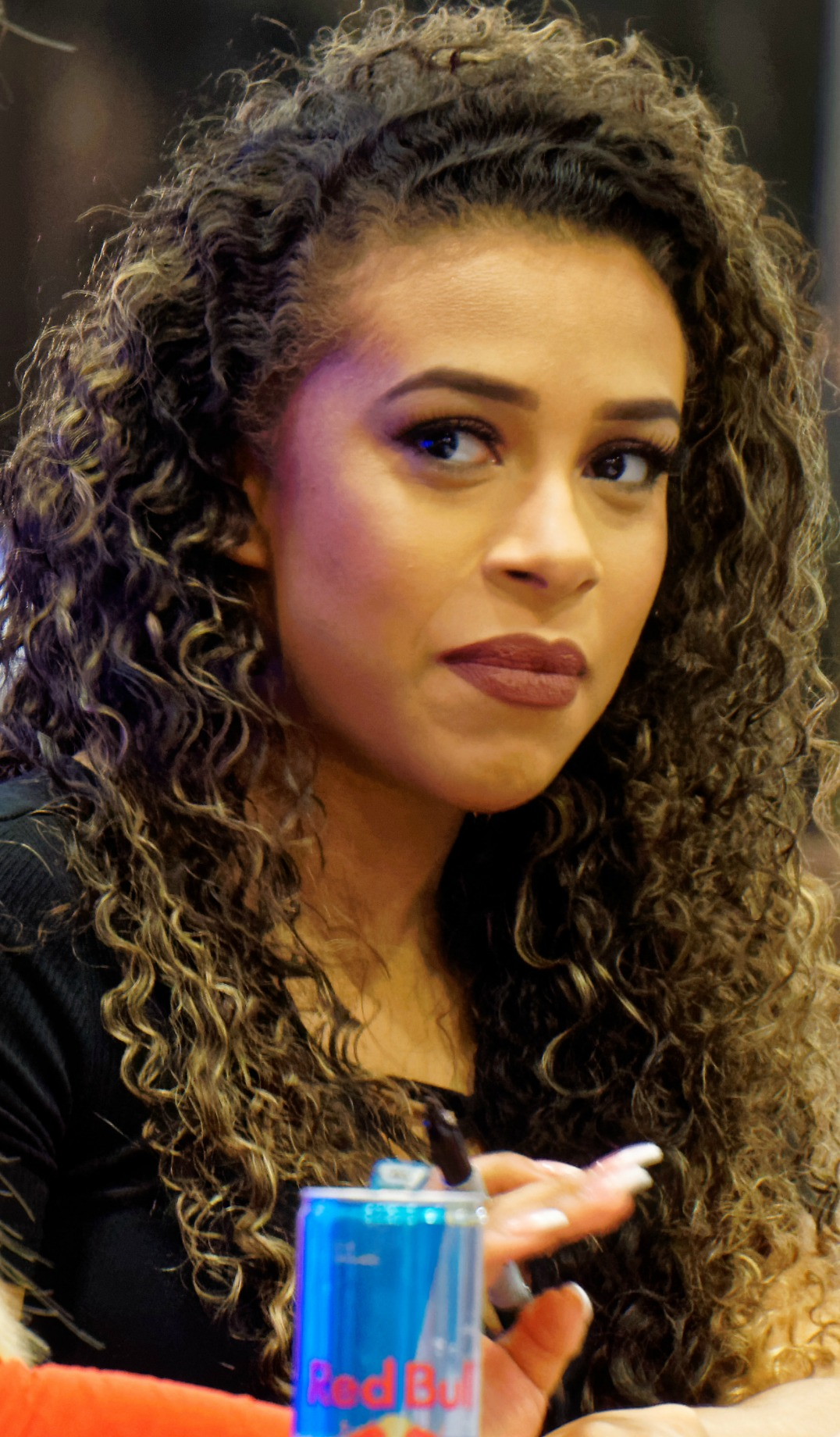
JoJo at WrestleMania Axxess, 2016.

=== Main cast ===
- Brie Bella (Brianna Danielson)
- Nikki Bella (Stephanie Garcia-Colace)
- Cameron (Ariane Andrew)
- Naomi (Trinity Fatu)
- Natalya (Natalie Neidhart-Wilson)
- Eva Marie (Natalie Coyle)
- JoJo (Joseann Offerman)

=== Recurring cast ===
- Daniel Bryan (Brie's husband)
- Vincent Isayan (Cameron's boyfriend)
- John Cena (Nikki's fiance)
- Jimmy Uso (Naomi's husband)
- Tyson Kidd (Natalya's husband)
- Jonathan Coyle (Eva Marie's husband)
- Mark Carrano (WWE Senior Director of Talent Relations)
- Jane Geddes (WWE Vice President of Talent Relations)
- Sandra Gray (WWE's seamstress)

=== Guest stars ===
- Alicia Fox (Victoria Crawford)
- Jim Neidhart (Nattie's father)
- Ellie Neidhart (Nattie's mother)
- Kathy Colace (Brie & Nikki's mother)

== Episodes ==
| No. overall | No. in season | Title | Original release date | Prod. code | U.S. viewers (millions) |
|---|---|---|---|---|---|
| 1 | 1 | "Welcome to the WWE" | July 28, 2013 | 101 | 1.34 |
The WWE Divas begin their preparations for WrestleMania XXIX, resulting in The Bella Twins, Brie and Nikki, receiving disappointing news about their match. Nikki starts to have doubts regarding her relationship with John Cena; Trinity is embarrassed when Ariane's boyfriend, Vinnie, ends up causing a scene backstage, and she's stuck in the middle.
| 2 | 2 | "A Tango With Fandango" | August 4, 2013 | 102 | 1.52 |
Eva Marie plans to get into the main roster by creating a scheming plan involving Fandango; Brie and Nikki take some time off and enjoy a vacation with Daniel Bryan and John; Ariane and Trinity are shocked when they experience a wardrobe malfunction.
| 3 | 3 | "Planet Funk is Funked Up" | August 11, 2013 | 103 | 1.67 |
Trinity and her fiancé Jon struggle with relationship problems; JoJo ends up giving her boyfriend an ultimatum; Nikki disagrees with Brie's decision to move to Phoenix.
| 4 | 4 | "The Fat Twin" | August 18, 2013 | 104 | 1.34 |
Nikki becomes self-conscious about her weight after reading some of the fans comments; Ariane considers getting breast implants; Nattie tells her fiancé TJ that she would like more romance in their relationship.
| 5 | 5 | "Feuding Funkadactyls" | August 25, 2013 | 105 | 1.46 |
Trinity and Ariane get into an argument that splits them apart; Brie encourages Nikki to reconcile with their father; Nattie and TJ's relationship is in trouble when TJ's mother visits.
| 6 | 6 | "Diva Las Vegas" | September 1, 2013 | 106 | 1.52 |
The Divas travel to Las Vegas for Nattie's bachelorette party; JoJo is confused about her relationship with Justin Gabriel; Nattie becomes stressed out when she keeps receiving flirts from her friend, Jaret.
| 7 | 7 | "A Leg Up" | September 8, 2013 | 107 | 1.09 |
Nikki's wrestling career is in jeopardy when she suffers an injury; Eva Marie does a photo shoot for Maxim, resulting in JoJo becoming jealous; Ariane is worried about taking her relationship with Vinnie to the next level.
| 8 | 8 | "No Longer The Bridesmaid" | September 15, 2013 | 108 | 1.03 |
Nattie and TJ's wedding takes an unexpected turn; John asks Nikki to meet his family; Ariane is rushed to the hospital, and Eva Marie and JoJo's friendship starts to fall apart.
| - | - | "Total Divas After Party" | September 15, 2013 | - | 0.93 |
The cast comes together in the mid-season reunion to discuss the highs and lows of season 1 so far.
| 9 | 9 | "Summer Slam" | November 10, 2013 | 109 | 1.25 |
Nikki begins to feel threatened when Eva Marie becomes increasingly popular; Ariane has trouble controlling her temper; Nattie is embarrassed after an in-ring incident, and John's attitude towards Nikki becomes suspicious due to his elbow injury.
| 10 | 10 | "Nurse Nikki" | November 17, 2013 | 110 | 1.41 |
Nikki decides to move in with John; Eva Marie considers cheating when she is asked to be an announcer on live television; Trinity convinces Jon to get his toe checked out.
| 11 | 11 | "Seeing Red" | November 24, 2013 | 111 | 0.92 |
Brie has a difficult time accepting Bryan's notoriety; Nattie feels that Eva Marie is trying to get too close to TJ; Nikki has to cope with John's demands, and Ariane is fearful about having sex with Vinnie.
| 12 | 12 | "Get That Chingle Chingle" | December 1, 2013 | 112 | 1.44 |
Ariane encourages Vinnie to try out for the WWE; Nikki has a difficult time getting used to living with John, while Trinity's relationship with Jon takes a turn when her dad moves in.
| 13 | 13 | "Saying Goodbye" | December 8, 2013 | 113 | 1.20 |
Trinity grows tired of Jon's jealous ways; Nikki is annoyed when Brie refers to Nikki's injury as a "vacation"; Nattie and TJ are devastated when they have to euthanize their cat, Gismo.
| 14 | 14 | "Ready to Ride" | December 15, 2013 | 114 | 1.29 |
Nikki and John's future begins to look uncertain; Bryan proposes to Brie, and Eva Marie finally introduces her fiancé, Jonathan, to her family.

== Ratings ==
| No. | Title | Original Air date | Viewership (millions) (Live+SD) | Rating/share (18–49) (Live+SD) | Rank per week on Cable |
|---|---|---|---|---|---|
| 1 | "Welcome to the WWE" | July 28, 2013 | 1.34 | 0.7 | —N/a |
| 2 | "A Tango With Fandango" | August 4, 2013 | 1.52 | 0.7 | —N/a |
| 3 | "Planet Funk is Funked Up" | August 11, 2013 | 1.67 | 0.9 | —N/a |
| 4 | "The Fat Twin" | August 18, 2013 | 1.34 | 0.7 | —N/a |
| 5 | "Feuding Funkadactyls" | August 25, 2013 | 1.46 | 0.7 | —N/a |
| 6 | "Diva Las Vegas" | September 1, 2013 | 1.52 | 0.8 | —N/a |
| 7 | "A Leg Up" | September 8, 2013 | 1.09 | 0.5 | —N/a |
| 8 | "No Longer The Bridesmaid" | September 15, 2013 | 1.03 | 0.5 | —N/a |
| – | "Total Divas After Party" | September 15, 2013 | 0.93 | 0.5 | —N/a |
| 9 | "Summer Slam" | November 10, 2013 | 1.25 | 0.6 | —N/a |
| 10 | "Nurse Nikki" | November 17, 2013 | 1.41 | 0.7 | —N/a |
| 11 | "Seeing Red" | November 24, 2013 | 0.92 | 0.5 | —N/a |
| 12 | "Get That Chingle Chingle" | December 1, 2013 | 1.44 | 0.7 | —N/a |
| 13 | "Saying Goodbye" | December 8, 2013 | 1.20 | 0.7 | —N/a |
| 14 | "Ready to Ride" | December 15, 2013 | 1.29 | 0.6 | —N/a |
