= Total Divas season 4 =

Season of American television series Total Divas

Total Divas
- Season 4
- Starring: Brie Bella; Eva Marie; Naomi; Natalya; Nikki Bella; Alicia Fox; Paige
- No. of episodes: 13

Release
- Original network: E!
- Original release: July 7 – September 29, 2015

Season chronology
- ← Previous; Season 3 Next → Season 5

Total Divas is an American reality television series that premiered on July 28, 2013, on E!. The series gave viewers an inside look of the lives of WWE Divas from their work within WWE to their personal lives. Behind the scene footage of the Divas is also included. Season 3 ended on March 8, 2015 with 1.21 million viewers.

== Production ==
The series gives viewers an inside look of the lives of WWE Divas from their work within WWE to their personal lives. Behind the scene footage of the Divas is also included. On February 24, 2015, Paige announced Total Divas was renewed for a fourth season, with filming commencing at the end of the month. It was then announced at the end of the season three finale, that the fourth season would premiere on July 7, 2015, moving from Sunday to Tuesday nights. Unlike other WWE programs, most of the performers use their real names instead of their ring names, leading to Cameron, Naomi, Natalya, Jimmy Uso, and Tyson Kidd being referred to as Ariane, Trinity, Nattie, Jon, and TJ respectively.

On April 1, 2015, E! announced the show had been renewed for a fourth season via a press release. In the press release, it was confirmed that Naomi would return as a series regular with Cameron and Rosa Mendes being removed from the main cast. All of the other divas would return as series regulars. On September 5, 2015, an online article states that there could be a strong possibility Total Divas will be renewed for a fifth season. It reads that season four will "wrap up this fall" and the new season "won't air till 2016 some time". On September 9, 2015, Naomi revealed on Twitter that she had been taken off the main cast after the mid-season finale, which aired on September 29. Season four may be extended following the mid-season hiatus instead of jumping to season five. There has been speculation that WWE Tough Enough runner-up Amanda Saccomanno may join the cast after the mid-season hiatus. It was later confirmed that Amanda will be joining the cast for season 5. After the September 22 episode of Total Divas aired, it was announced that next weeks episode would serve as the season finale, rather than a mid-season finale, so the show will jump to a fifth season following the conclusion of season four.

== Cast ==
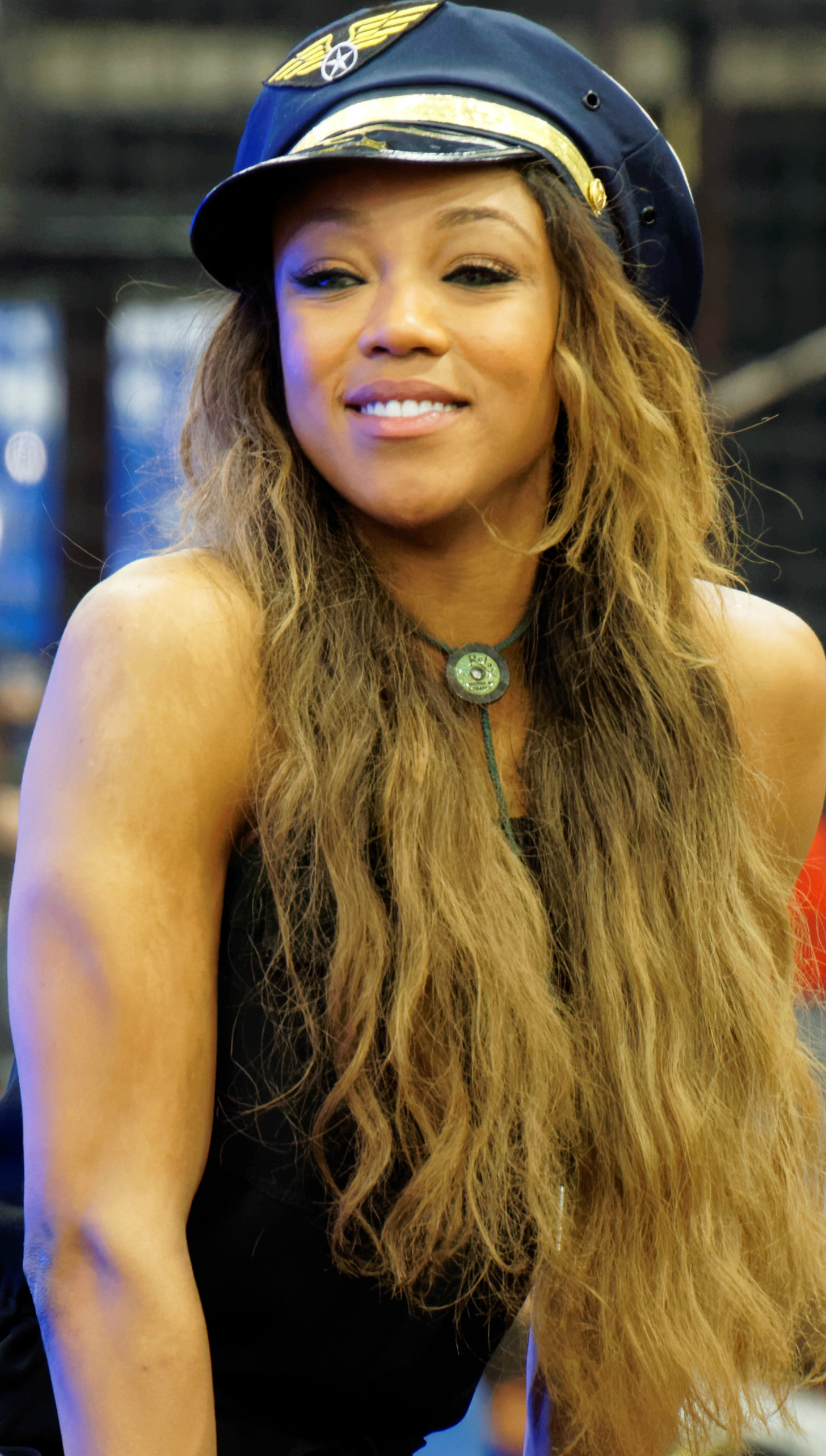
Alicia Fox; who joined the cast of Total Divas in the second-half of season 3.

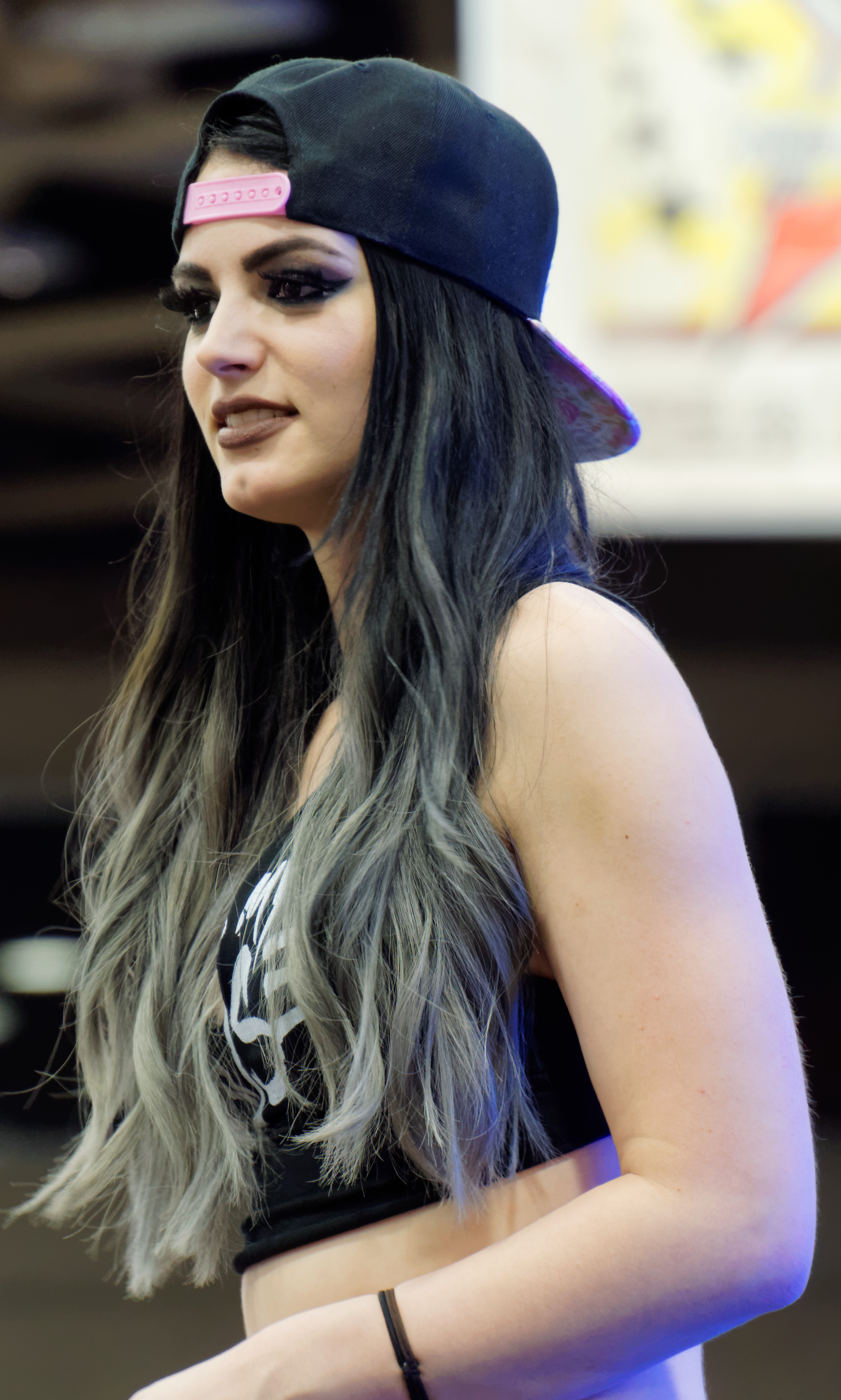
Paige; who joined the cast of Total Divas in the second-half of season 3.

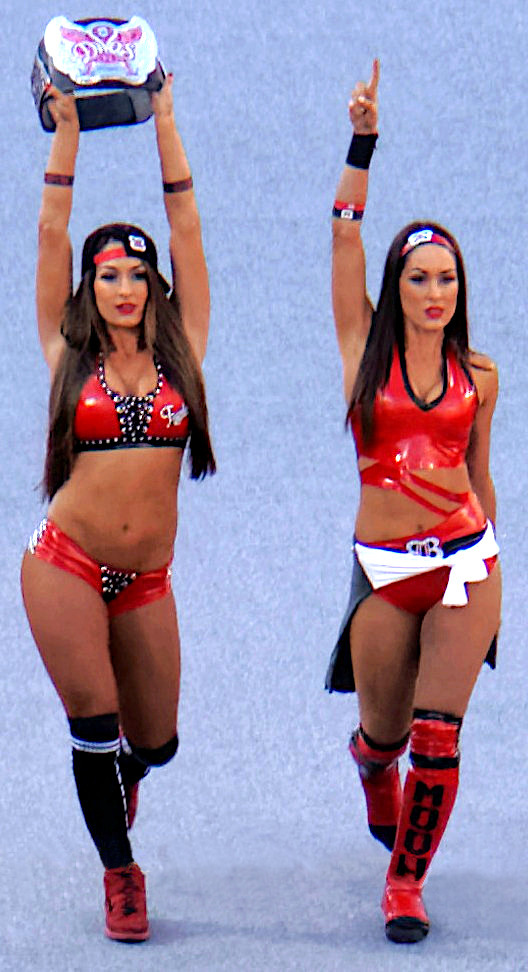
The Bella Twins: Nikki (left) and Brie (right) at WrestleMania 31.

=== Main cast ===
- Brie Bella (Brianna Danielson)
- Eva Marie (Natalie Marie Coyle)
- Naomi (Trinity Fatu)
- Natalya (Natalie Neidhart-Wilson)
- Nikki Bella (Stephanie Garcia-Colace)
- Alicia Fox (Victoria Crawford)
- Paige (Saraya-Jade Bevis)

=== Recurring cast ===
- Cameron (Ariane Andrew)
- Rosa Mendes (Milena Roucka)
- Summer Rae (Danielle Moinet)
- Daniel Bryan (Brie's husband)
- Jonathan Coyle (Eva Marie's husband)
- Jimmy Uso (Naomi's husband)
- Tyson Kidd (Natalya's husband)
- John Cena (Nikki's fiancé)
- Mark Carrano (WWE Senior Director of Talent Relations)
- Kathy Colace (Brie & Nikki's mother)
- Ellie Neidhart (Nattie's mother)
- Renee Young (Renee Paquette)
- Dolph Ziggler (Nicholas "Nick" Nemeth)
- J.J. Garcia (Brie & Nikki's brother)
- Brian Kendrick (Eva's personal trainer)
- Emma (Tenille Dashwood)
- Tamina Snuka (Sarona Snuka-Polamalu)
- Kevin Skaff (Paige's ex-boyfriend)

=== Guest stars ===
- JoJo (Joseann Offerman)
- Jim Neidhart (Nattie's father)
- Lilian Garcia (WWE Ring Announcer)
- Jenni Neidhart (Nattie's sister)
- Vincent Isayan (Cameron's boyfriend)

== Episodes ==
No. overall	No. in season	Title	Original release date	Prod. code	U.S. viewers (millions)
46	1	"Diva Divide"	July 1, 2015	401	0.97
47	2	"She Said, She Said"	July 8, 2015	402	1.03
48	3	"Eat Your Heart Out"	July 15, 2015	403	0.99
49	4	"Divas on Overdrive"	July 22, 2015	404	1.08
50	5	"Tea Mode"	July 29, 2015	405	1.01
51	6	"Good Diva, Bad Diva"	August 5, 2015	406	1.17
52	7	"No Holds Barre"	August 12, 2015	407	1.03
53	8	"It's a Beautiful Life?"	August 19, 2015	408	0.92
54	9	"Clash of the Divas"	August 26, 2015	409	1.02
55	10	"Gone With the Wine"	September 9, 2015	410	1.14
56	11	"An Unwanted Proposal"	September 16, 2015	411	0.80
57	12	"Some Like It Hot"	September 23, 2015	412	0.79
58	13	"Return of the Ex"	September 30, 2015	413	1.15

== Ratings ==
No.	Title	Original Air date	Viewership (millions) (Live+SD)	Rating/share (18–49) (Live+SD)	Rank per week on Cable
1	"Diva Divide"	July 7, 2015	0.97	0.5	#12
2	"She Said, She Said"	July 14, 2015	1.03	0.4	#13
3	"Eat Your Heart Out"	July 21, 2015	0.99	0.4	#13
4	"Divas on Overdrive"	July 28, 2015	1.08	0.4	#19
5	"Tea Mode"	August 4, 2015	1.01	0.5	#10
6	"Good Diva, Bad Diva"	August 11, 2015	1.17	0.5	#10
7	"No Holds Barre"	August 18, 2015	1.03	0.5	#10
8	"It's a Beautiful Life?"	August 25, 2015	0.92	0.4	#17
9	"Clash of the Divas"	September 1, 2015	1.02	0.5	#8
10	"Gone With the Wine"	September 8, 2015	1.14	0.5	#10
11	"An Unwanted Proposal"	September 15, 2015	0.80	0.4	#16
12	"Some Like It Hot"	September 22, 2015	0.79	0.4	#10
13	"Return of the Ex"	September 29, 2015	1.15	0.5	#5
