= Total Divas =

American reality television series

- Genre: Reality television
- Starring: Brie Bella; Cameron; Eva Marie; JoJo; Naomi; Natalya; Nikki Bella; Summer Rae; Rosa Mendes; Alicia Fox; Paige; Mandy Rose; Lana; Maryse; Renee Young; Alexa Bliss; Carmella; Nia Jax; Ronda Rousey; Sonya Deville
- Opening theme: "Top of the World" by CFO$
- Country of origin: United States
- Original language: English
- No. of seasons: 9
- No. of episodes: 120 (list of episodes)

Production
- Executive producers: Gil Goldshein; Jeff Jenkins; Mary-Ellis Bunim; Jonathan Murray; Russell Jay; Nikki Bella (2017–2019); Brie Bella (2019); Ronda Rousey (2019)
- Camera setup: Multiple
- Running time: 39–44 minutes
- Production companies: Bunim/Murray Productions; World Wrestling Entertainment

Original release
- Network: E!
- Release: July 28, 2013 – December 10, 2019

Related
- Total Bellas; Miz & Mrs.

Total Divas is an American reality television series that aired from July 28, 2013, to December 10, 2019, on E! Television. The series gave viewers an inside look into the lives of female WWE wrestlers from their work within WWE to their personal lives with the inclusion of behind the scenes footage. All nine seasons were later made available on WWE's on-demand streaming service, WWE Network, until its closure in 2024. As of 2026, following Peacock's five-year expiration, many WWE reality shows; Total Divas, Total Bellas, and Miz & Mrs. have all vanished from the service, and are not able to stream anywhere.

== Production ==
=== Development ===
In 2011, it was reported that WWE had released a survey to gauge interest in original content intended for the newly announced WWE Network. One of the prospective shows would be a reality show that followed the lives of six WWE Divas on the road, all living on the same tour bus that would also feature a 24/7 webcam for fans to unlock via password.

In April 2013, an article on WWE.com stated: "WWE is contemplating a potential Divas reality show: It's a new reality series following the life and times of eight WWE Divas that lets viewers into the Divas locker room, behind the scenes on the road, and inside the personal lives of some of the most glitzy, gritty and glamorous celebrities in all of entertainment." Fans were also asked to vote in a poll to help determine a name, with the six options including: WWE Divas Road Trip, Hot Wheels, Heels on Wheels. The latter title, Heels on Wheels, was trademarked by WWE in 2011, and according to a 2019 interview with former WWE writer Brian Mann, was the original title for the series.

Total Divas was revealed later in 2013, as a part of a partnership with E! and Bunim/Murray. The cast for the newly announced series consisted of The Bella Twins (Brie and Nikki Bella), Naomi, Cameron, Natalya, Eva Marie, and JoJo. It was announced on August 14, 2013, that E! had ordered an additional six episodes to the already eight episode first season, bringing the total episode number up to fourteen episodes. The mid-season finale aired on September 15, 2013, with the season continuing on November 10, 2013. WWE commentator Josh Mathews revealed on November 20, 2013, that Total Divas had been renewed for a second season. The second season premiered on March 16, 2014.

On May 19, 2014, E! announced that the third season of Total Divas would premiere on September 7, 2014. On February 24, 2015, Paige announced Total Divas was renewed for a fourth season, with filming commencing at the end of the month. It was then announced at the end of season three, that the fourth season would premiere on July 7, 2015, moving from Sunday to Tuesday nights. On April 1, 2015, E! announced the show had been renewed for a fourth season via a press release. After the September 22 episode of Total Divas aired, it was announced that the following week's episode would serve as the season finale, rather than a mid-season finale.

Season 5 was announced on October 6, 2015, and premiered on January 19, 2016. Season 6 was officially confirmed on April 18, 2016, by the E! Network. Its premiered on November 16, 2016. Additionally, the E! Network announced that Brie and Nikki would be getting their own spin-off, also with a fall premiere date, titled Total Bellas.

On January 28, 2017, it was announced that Nikki Bella would serve as an executive producer of the show when the series returned in April 2017. On September 20, 2017, E! revealed that the seventh season will premiere on November 1, 2017. On May 7, 2018, E! and WWE announced that Total Divas had been renewed for its eighth and ninth seasons. Season 8 premiered on September 19, 2018. Season 9 and its final season premiered on October 1, 2019.

In June 2021, Essentially Sports reported that the E! Network had quietly cancelled Total Divas and its sister show Total Bellas, citing low ratings and a lack of interest from those involved.

== Cast ==
In a 2021 interview, Cameron claimed that Vince McMahon handpicked the cast of the first season of Total Divas, which consisted of The Bella Twins (Brie and Nikki Bella), Naomi, Cameron, Natalya, Eva Marie, and JoJo. TJ Wilson, husband of Natalya, stated in 2023 that she was almost not part of the cast for the first season due to concerns over her traditional wrestling background. However, it was McMahon who decided that her background would be helpful for the audience, and thus casting her on the show. 2007 WWE Diva Search winner Eve Torres stated in a 2016 interview with WWE's Where Are They Now? web series that Triple H had offered her a role on the cast of Total Divas ahead of its first season, with her upcoming WWE departure being featured as a possible storyline. However, she declined the offer due to personal reasons.

Eva Marie revealed that after being signed to WWE following the 2013 WWE Diva Search that was not televised, she was asked to audition for the show that was still in development. Within 72 hours of auditioning, Marie was cast and sent to WrestleMania 29 to begin filming. 2013 Diva Search runner-up JoJo was cast in the first season at the age of 19, leaving the show after the first season, being replaced by Summer Rae in the second season. During a 2017 Q&A to promote her book, Crazy Is My Superpower, AJ Lee revealed that she had declined an offer to replace JoJo and join the cast for the second season, objecting to the idea of presenting an inauthentic version of herself after being offered multiple storylines to choose from.

During the third season premiere, 2006 Diva Search finalist Rosa Mendes joined the cast, and was joined by Paige and Alicia Fox following the mid-season break. Naomi and Summer Rae also left the cast during the second half of the season, with the former tweeting that it was not her decision. Naomi returned to the cast during the fourth season, whereas Mendes and Cameron departed the series. However, Naomi left the cast once again during its fifth season, with Mendes returning and WWE Tough Enough Season 6 runner-up Mandy Rose joining the cast for the first time.

The sixth season featured three departures in Alicia Fox, Mandy Rose, and Rosa Mendes, with the trio being replaced by newcomers Renee Young, Lana, and 2006 Diva Search finalist Maryse, along with Naomi rejoining the cast as a series regular. On June 9, 2017, it was reported that Alexa Bliss and Nia Jax would be joining the seventh season of Total Divas. On June 10, 2017, Renee Young confirmed via Twitter that she would not be returning. On June 29, 2017, it was reported that Carmella would be joining the cast and that Paige had departed the show for the final time.

On May 15, 2018, it was announced that Carmella would not be returning for the show's eighth season. It was later revealed that Paige and Lana were also leaving the show. Lana later revealed in a 2019 interview that she was removed from the show because her storylines were "hated" by the E! demo following market research. Fans also noticed toward the later seasons that Total Divas would incorporate scripted elements or fake hatred between cast members to sell drama. In April 2019, Brie and Nikki Bella announced that they would not be returning for the ninth season of Total Divas, stating that they wanted to focus solely on Total Bellas. On August 26, 2019, it was revealed that Naomi, Natalya, and Nia Jax were set to return for season nine alongside Carmella, who was announced to be returning as a series regular, and new cast members Ronda Rousey and Sonya Deville. Additionally, Brie and Nikki Bella were reported to continue making guest appearances throughout the season. The ninth season premiered on October 1, 2019.

== Cast overview ==
Cast member	Seasons								
Cast member	1	2	3	4	5	6	7	8	9
Brie Bella	Main	Main	Main	Main	Main	Main	Main	Main	Guest
Cameron	Main	Main	Main	Guest					
Eva Marie	Main	Main	Main	Main	Main	Main			
JoJo	Main		Guest	Guest	Guest	Guest	Guest	Guest	Guest
Naomi (Note: In season 3, Naomi and Summer Rae were credited as main cast members from 3x01 to 3x10.)	Main	Main	Main	Main	Guest	Main	Main	Main	Main
Natalya	Main	Main	Main	Main	Main	Main	Main	Main	Main
Nikki Bella	Main	Main	Main	Main	Main	Main	Main	Main	Guest
Summer Rae		Main	Main	Guest	Guest	Guest			
Rosa Mendes		Guest	Main	Guest	Main	Guest			
Alicia Fox (Note: In season 3, Alicia Fox and Paige were credited as main cast members from 3x11 to 3x20.)	Guest	Guest	Main	Main	Main	Guest	Guest	Guest	
Paige			Main	Main	Main	Main		Main	Guest
Mandy Rose					Main			Guest	Guest
Lana				Guest		Main	Main	Main	
Maryse						Main	Main		
Renee Young				Guest	Guest	Main	Guest	Guest	Guest
Alexa Bliss						Guest	Main	Guest	Guest
Carmella						Guest	Main	Guest	Main
Nia Jax						Guest	Main	Main	Main
Ronda Rousey								Guest	Main
Sonya Deville								Guest	Main

Cast notes

== Episodes ==
Season	Episodes	Originally released	
Season	Episodes	First released	Last released
1	14	July 28, 2013	December 15, 2013
2	11	March 16, 2014	June 1, 2014
3	20	September 7, 2014	March 8, 2015
4	13	July 7, 2015	September 29, 2015
5	14	January 19, 2016	April 19, 2016
6	16	November 16, 2016	May 10, 2017
7	12	November 1, 2017	January 31, 2018
8	10	September 19, 2018	November 28, 2018
9	10	October 1, 2019	December 10, 2019

== Awards and nominations ==
Year	Award	Category	Nominee(s)	Result	Ref
2014	Teen Choice Awards	Choice TV: Reality Show	Total Divas	Nominated	
2014	PopSugar Best of 2014 Awards	Best Reality Show	Total Divas	Won	
2016	Teen Choice Awards	Choice TV: Reality Show	Total Divas	Nominated	

== Reception ==
=== Ratings ===
The series premiered on July 28, 2013, drawing 1.34 million viewers. It would remain the highest rated season premiere throughout its run. The highest rated episode of the series was "Planet Funk is Funked Up" during the first season, garnering 1.67 million viewers. The lowest rated episode of the series was "MountainMania" during the ninth season, which only garnered a 0.19 in the ratings. The season two premiere episode "New Diva On The Block" received 1.07 million viewers. The following episode "The Braniel Bus" had a strong rise in viewers garnering 1.28 million viewers. The season three premiere attracted over 1.2 million viewers and 821K Adults 18–49, the series was up +15% and +17% respectively versus the season 2 premiere, as well as garnered 26,000 tweets and ranked as the #1 ad-supported cable program of the night. The third-season premiere of Total Divas outdrew the previous season's opener. The ninth-season premiere episode pulled in a 0.25 rating, with the finale garnering a 0.22. This resulted in the cancellation of the show.

=== Critical response ===
Tom Conroy of Media Life Magazine found the premiere "not very interesting", adding that it "feels real-ish" but "if the stars are doing any damage to their reputations, it's that they appear to be too nice. That might make their fans happy, but viewers expecting a smackdown can and will go elsewhere." Diva-Dirt.com stated "Meet Your New Guilty Pleasure!". Eric Gargiulo of Camel Clutch Blog said "I tuned in to WWE Total Divas expecting to see a scripted reality show in the vein of Hogan Knows Best. Instead I got an interesting look behind the scenes of the WWE and its superstars more in the same vein as Beyond the Mat."

=== Impact ===
Total Divas is attributed with growing the female audience demographic for WWE. In a 2020 interview, Stephanie McMahon stated: "We saw an increase in our female audience in different platforms and different channels. [...] The 40 per cent stayed for our core programming, but Total Divas and Total Bellas, the female viewership went through the roof. On YouTube, on social media, our female viewership increased."

The show is credited with playing a role within the Divas Revolution, which resulted in more TV time for the female talent, deeper storylines, and the retirement of the "Divas" branding, instead being referring to female wrestlers as "Superstars" like the men. Scarlett Harris wrote for Digital Spy in 2019: "a legion of new women's wrestling fans will be watching Evolution, thanks in no small part to the pop cultural cachet of Total Divas. Whether wrestling purists like it or not, Total Divas is a cornerstone in the women's wrestling evolution."

In 2023, Nikki Bella reflected on the backlash the show received from within the wrestling industry: "Total Divas should have been praised even more, I felt, because what we were doing was we literally were at the point of almost beating the Kardashians in the ratings. [...] We could have had the industry behind us, but instead they used it to turn it against us."

A number of female wrestlers attributed their initial interest in the sport to Total Divas. These women include Bianca Belair, Maxxine Dupri, Jakara Jackson, and Fallon Henley. Belair also hoped that her own WWE produced reality show, Love & WWE: Bianca & Montez, could interest future female fans as Total Divas did for her.
