= Sandra Gray =

American fashion designer

Sandra Gray is a fashion and costume designer known particularly for her work designing and building costumes for wrestling.

== Biography ==
Gray was born June 27, 1956. Her father was in the Army, and her mother won a sewing machine in a bingo game while on the base that she passed to her daughter, and Gray taught herself how to sew and make clothes for herself and her friends.

In 1994, while living in Marietta, Georgia, Gray was engaged to make a costume for Marc Mero. Mero stated that Gray answered a newspaper advertisement, although Gray recalls being approached by Mero's girlfriend at the time Rena Greek, who had heard about her sewing skills. The costume that Gray created established Mero's signature character, Johnny B. Badd, based on Little Richard. As a result of this commission, and due to word-of-mouth from Mero, Gray became a successful designer and costumier specialising in wrestling wear. With the support of Miss Elizabeth and Lex Luger, she signed an exclusive contract with World Championship Wrestling which the majority of its assets were acquired by the World Wrestling Federation in 2001. Gray was employed as costume designer for WWE until 2015. Gray got hired at All Elite Wrestling in 2019 as their in-house seamstress. In her job, she was often seen on the WWE reality programme Total Divas. She was succeeded by Sarath Ton, a former independent wrestler known as Mikaze.

Gray's other wrestling clients include Layla El, Nikki Bella, Alicia Fox, Cameron, Dustin and Cody Rhodes, Dolph Ziggler and Allie. She originated Naomi's trademark glow-in-the-dark costumes in 2016, and created wedding dresses for Naomi's 2014 wedding to Jimmy Uso and for Penelope Ford's on-screen marriage to Kip Sabian on AEW Dynamite in February 2021. Gray has also made cheerleader uniforms, including the inaugural cheerleader uniforms for the Houston Texans squad's debut in September 2011.

In 2016, Gray opened a shop in Riverview, Florida, selling both her original designs and vintage clothing.
