= Summer Rae =

American professional wrestler (b. 1983)

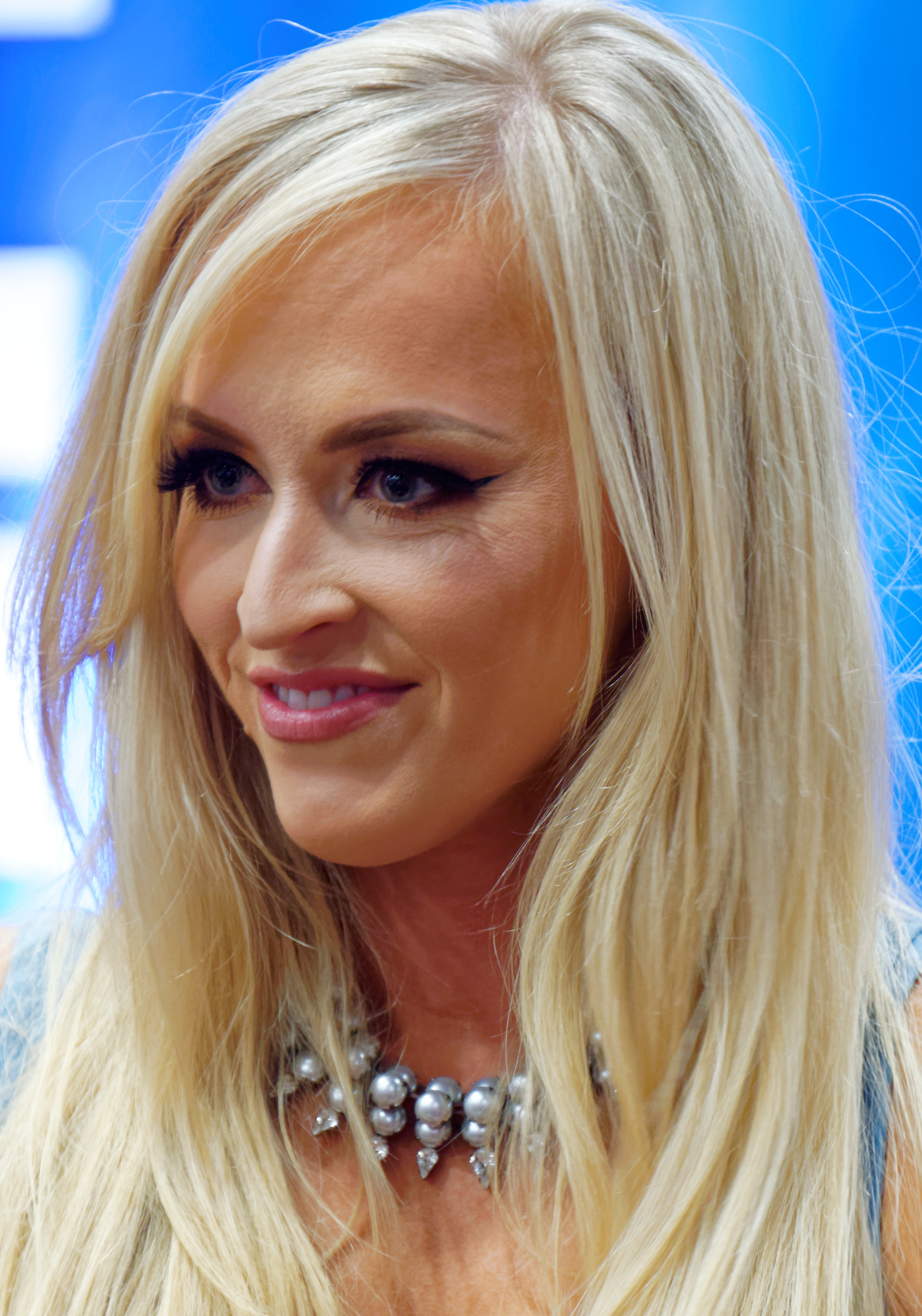
- Moinet in 2016

Personal information
- Born: Danielle Louise Moinet; November 28, 1983 (age 42) Manhasset, New York, U.S.
- Education: East Carolina University

Professional wrestling career
- Ring name(s): Danielle Moinet; Kylie Summers; Summer Rae
- Billed height: 5 ft 10 in (178 cm)
- Billed weight: 125 lb (57 kg)
- Billed from: Raleigh, North Carolina
- Trained by: Florida Championship Wrestling
- Debut: 2011
- Retired: 2022

Danielle Louise Moinet (born November 28, 1983) is an American model, actress and retired professional wrestler and American football player. She is best known for her tenure in WWE from 2011 to 2017, under the ring name Summer Rae. Moinet was a main cast member on the reality show Total Divas during its second and third seasons. Before joining WWE, she played with the Chicago Bliss of the Lingerie Football League.

== Early life ==
Moinet was born in the New York City suburb of Manhasset, New York. Her father is French, while her mother is English. She grew up in Raleigh, North Carolina, and attended Enloe High School and East Carolina University in Greenville, North Carolina, where she was a member of the Alpha Delta Pi sorority.

== Football career ==
Moinet played with the Chicago Bliss of the Lingerie Football League (LFL) from 2008 to 2011. She played as a cornerback and was the team's captain. On June 30, 2011, Moinet played in the LFL All-Star Game at Copps Coliseum in Hamilton, Ontario, Canada which was her final game in the LFL. She was one of two players in the game from the Chicago Bliss.

== Professional wrestling career ==
=== WWE (2011–2017) ===
==== FCW and NXT (2011–2014) ====
In November 2011, it was reported that Moinet had signed a contract with WWE and was assigned to their developmental territory Florida Championship Wrestling (FCW). Moinet made her televised debut on the December 18 episode of FCW TV, appearing in an in-ring promo with Abraham Washington. She also served as the ring announcer for FCW TV for several months. Changing her ring name from Kylie Summers to Summer Rae, she was prevented from interfering in a match between Seth Rollins and Rae's new client Brad Maddox by the debuting Paige on the March 5 episode of FCW TV.

On the March 11 episode of FCW TV, Rae became the FCW General Manager. On the March 15 episode of FCW TV, Rae decided to deactivate the Queen of FCW crown, leaving Raquel Diaz as the last champion. Rae made her in-ring debut on April 6 at an FCW live event, where she lost to Sofia Cortez in an elimination triple threat match, which also involved Paige.

After the dissolution of FCW, Rae went on to become a ring announcer for the rebooted NXT in 2012. Rae transitioned into an in-ring competitor on the January 30, 2013 episode of NXT when she attacked Paige due to her jealousy of Paige's popularity and success. After Paige continued to confront Rae, Rae was defeated against Paige on the May 1 episode of NXT.

Rae competed in the NXT Women's Championship tournament on the June 19 episode of NXT to crown the inaugural champion and defeated Sasha Banks in the first round, but lost to Emma in the semi-finals on July 10. Rae's post-match attack on Emma started a feud between them. Emma later defeated Rae in a dance-off to become the number one contender, but Rae retaliated by injuring Emma in the storyline, then issued a title challenge to the new NXT Women's Champion Paige, which she accepted. On the August 14 episode NXT, Paige defeated Rae to retain the title. For weeks, Rae began to influence Sasha Banks to make herself relevant, leading to Banks turning heel on the September 11 episode of NXT, by attacking NXT Women's Champion Paige. Banks and Rae, collectively known as the Beautiful Fierce Females, faced Paige and Emma on the October 16 episode of NXT, where they won. Rae and Banks continued to face Paige and Emma in singles matches, including aligning themselves with Charlotte.

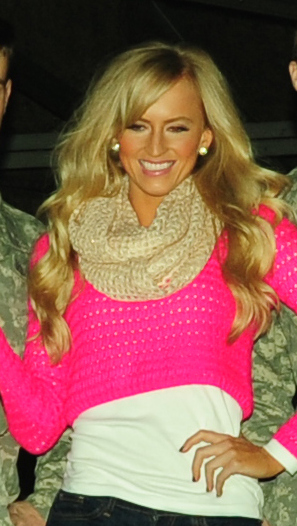
Rae at WWE Tribute to the Troops in 2013

After a four-month absence from the brand, Rae returned on the June 6 episode of NXT, briefly distracting Charlotte during her match. After the match, Rae led an attack on Bayley, only to be chased off by Paige and Emma. On the June 26 episode of NXT, during a match with the debuting Becky Lynch, Charlotte and Sasha Banks backed away from Rae when reaching out for help, hinting at Rae's removal from the stable. The following week, Banks disbanded the BFFs in a backstage segment. The following week, Rae defeated Bayley in a number one contender's match, earning a NXT Women's Championship match against Charlotte. On the July 24 episode of NXT, Rae received her title shot against Charlotte, however she failed to capture the championship.

==== Fandango's dance partner (2013–2014) ====
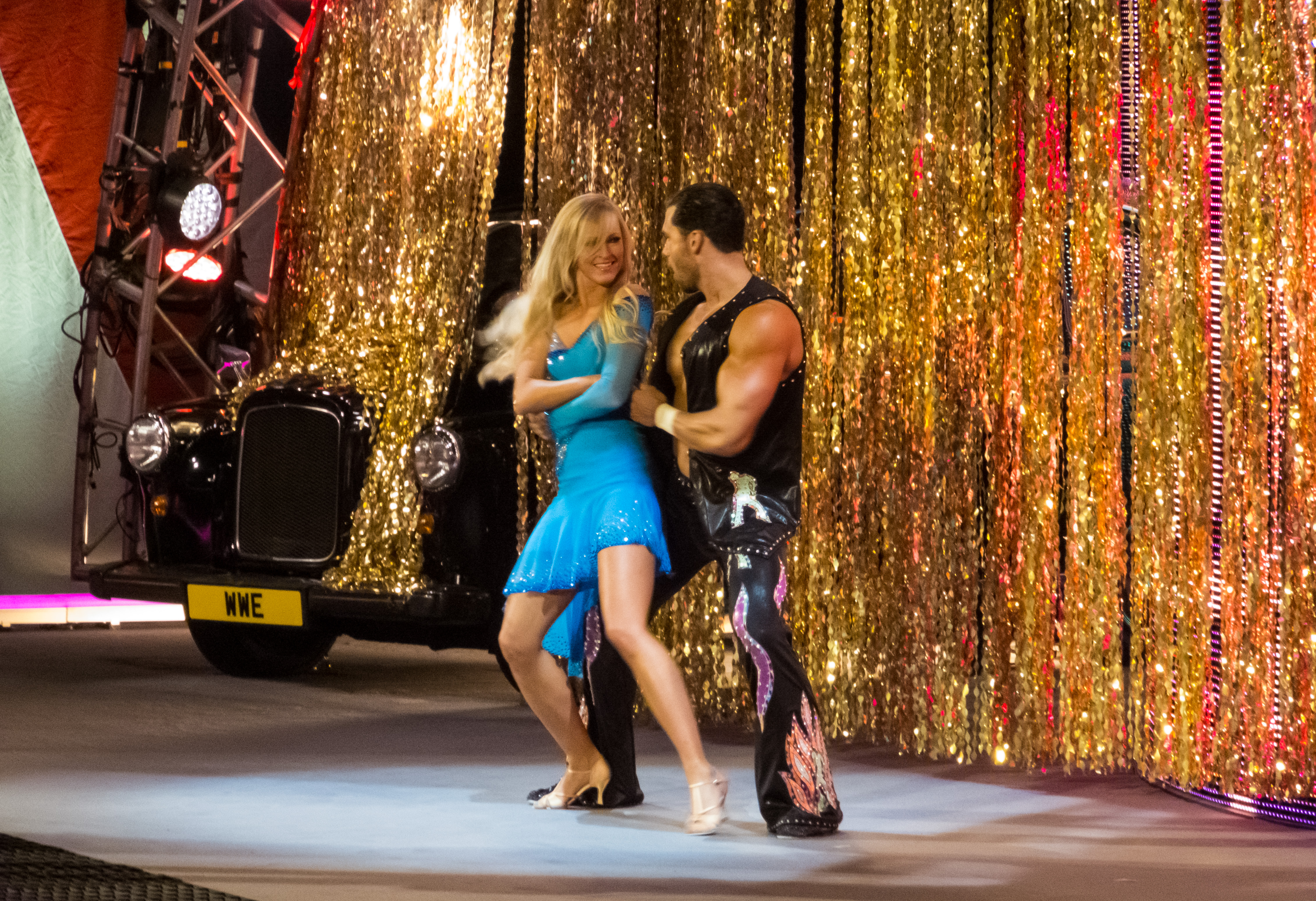
Rae as Fandango's dance partner during a WWE Raw event in April 2013

Rae made her official debut on WWE's main roster on the April 22, 2013 episode of Raw, as Fandango's dance partner and valet, becoming the first Diva to be called up from the rebranded NXT. On the May 13 episode of Raw, Rae, along with Fandango, faced Chris Jericho and Dancing with the Stars competitor Edyta Śliwińska in a dance-off, but Fandango's dance was cut short by an apparent injury to Rae's ankle. However, Rae later revealed that her injury was a distraction to trap Jericho into Fandango's attack. On the October 25 episode of SmackDown, Rae got into a brawl with Natalya during a match between Fandango and The Great Khali, which set up a mixed tag team match for Hell in a Cell in which she made both her pay-per-view and in-ring debut on the main roster, teaming with Fandango to defeat Natalya and Khali, after Rae pinned Natalya. The following night, Rae made her singles debut in a rematch against Natalya, where she was defeated. At Survivor Series on November 23, Rae participated in a seven-on-seven elimination tag team match, as her team took on the cast of Total Divas, where she was eliminated by Nikki Bella, before her team ultimately lost the match. A rematch took place the following night on Raw, where her team was once again defeated, with Rae being the last to be eliminated. On the December 19 episode of Superstars, Rae defeated Kaitlyn, garnering her first singles match victory on the main roster. In the beginning of 2014, Rae began a rivalry with Emma, and the two competed in several dance-off and wrestling competitions on both Raw and SmackDown, which Emma won. On April 6, Rae made her WrestleMania debut, competing at WrestleMania XXX in the 14-Diva "Vickie Guerrero Invitational match" for the Divas Championship, which was won by the defending champion AJ Lee.

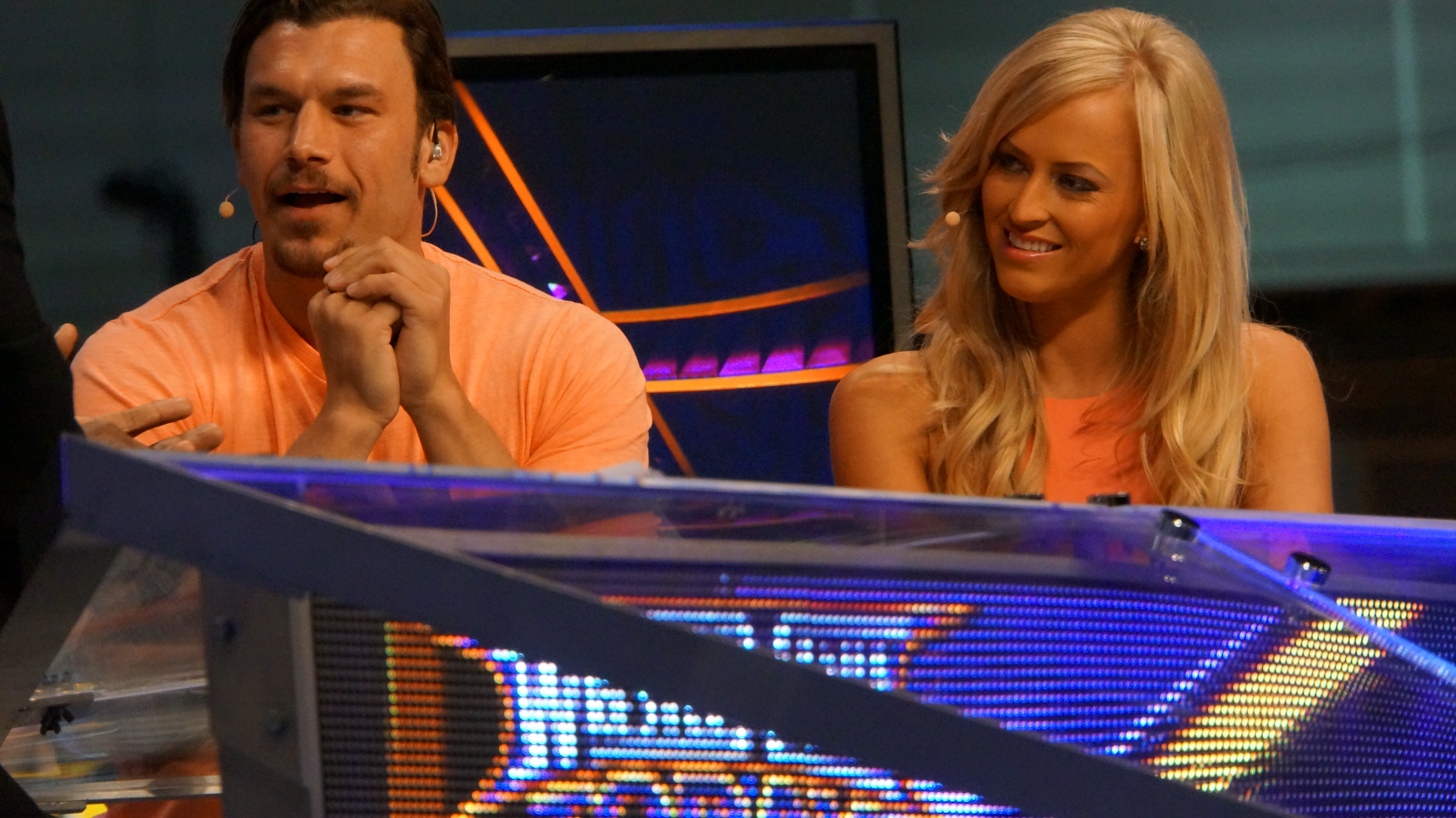
Rae with Fandango in the leadup to WrestleMania XXX.

On April 8, Fandango announced the end of his association with Rae on his Twitter account and introduced Layla as his new dance partner on the April 11 episode of SmackDown, which in storyline was put in place to allow Rae time off television to film The Marine 4. Rae returned on the May 19 episode of Raw, confronting and kissing Fandango and attacking Layla before their match. Rae made her in-ring return on the following episode of Raw, in a losing effort to Eva Marie after interference from both Fandango and Layla. In the following weeks, Rae and Layla assaulted each other backstage and at ringside during Fandango's matches, leading to a match between Rae and Layla at the Money in the Bank on June 29, with Fandango as the special guest referee, which Layla won.

==== Various alliances and departure (2014–2017) ====
On the June 30, 2014 episode of Raw, she cost Fandango's match. On the July 11 episode of SmackDown, Rae and Layla turned face and started an alliance after attacking Fandango during their match where he was working as guest referee. One week later on SmackDown they lost their first match as team (dubbing themselves "The Slayers"). The Slayers won their first match as a team on the September 2 episode of Main Event. At Survivor Series, Rae participated in an elimination tag team match, where she was eliminated by Emma before her team lost the match. In January 2015, The Slayers quietly disbanded when Layla underwent surgery.

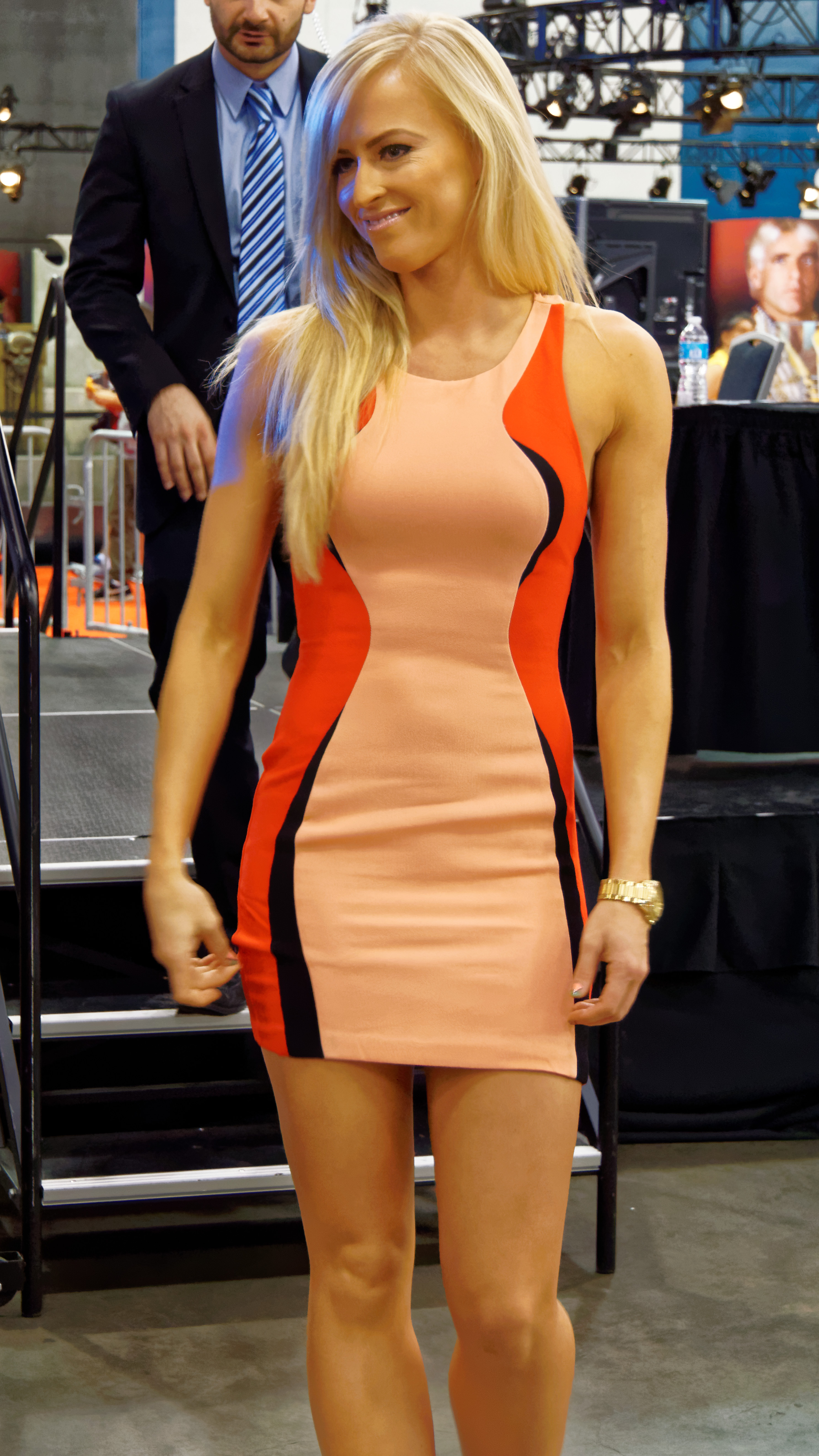
Rae in 2015

Upon the release of Rae's first film The Marine 4: Moving Target in April where she was the first diva to be in an action film, she was disrespected by her co-star The Miz, and as a result, she allied herself with Miz's enemy, Damien Sandow. On the April 20 episode of Raw, Rae helped Miz win a match against Sandow, having been working with Miz from the start.

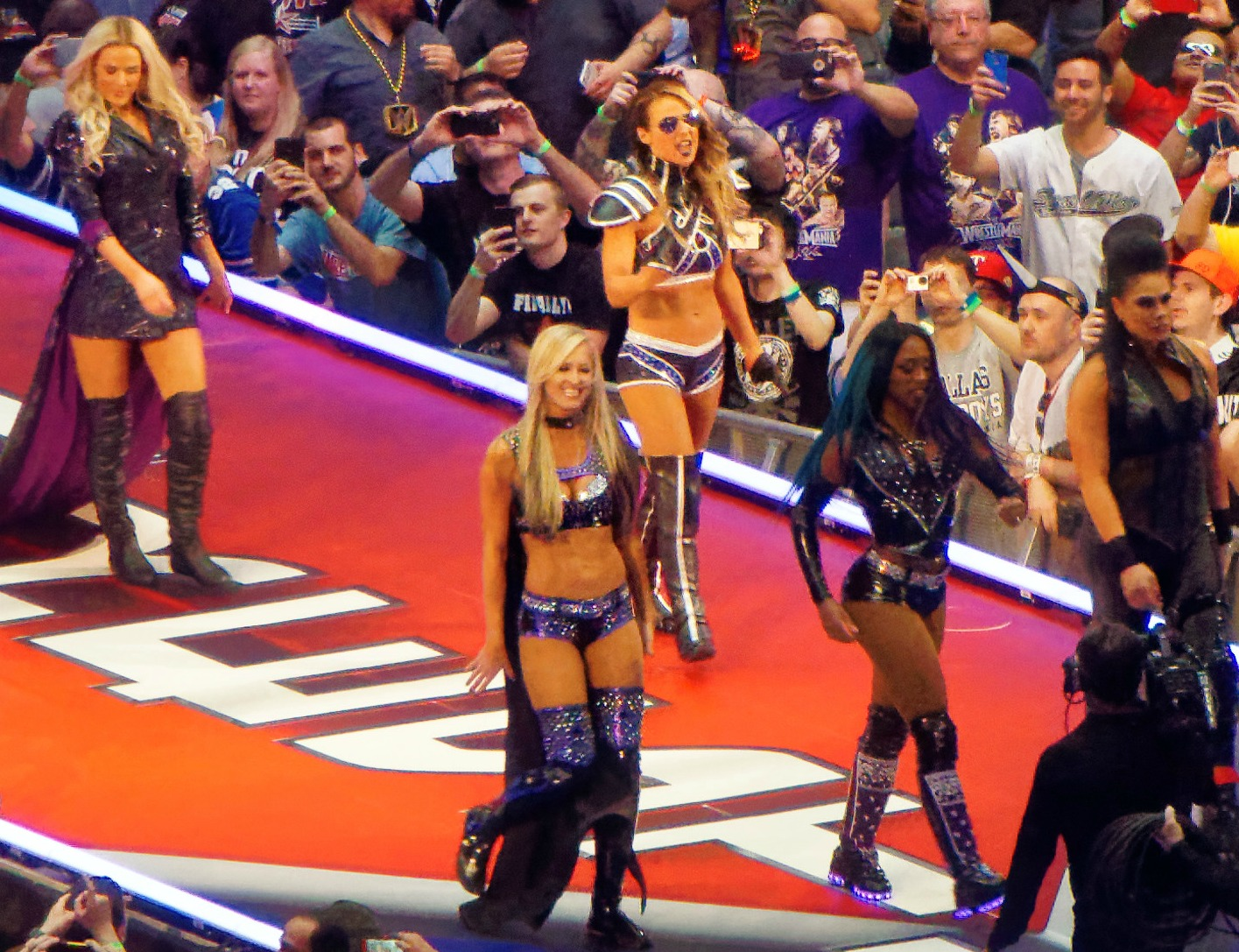
Rae (front left), along fellow Team B.A.D. & Blonde members, walking to the ring before their match at the WrestleMania 32 event in April 2016

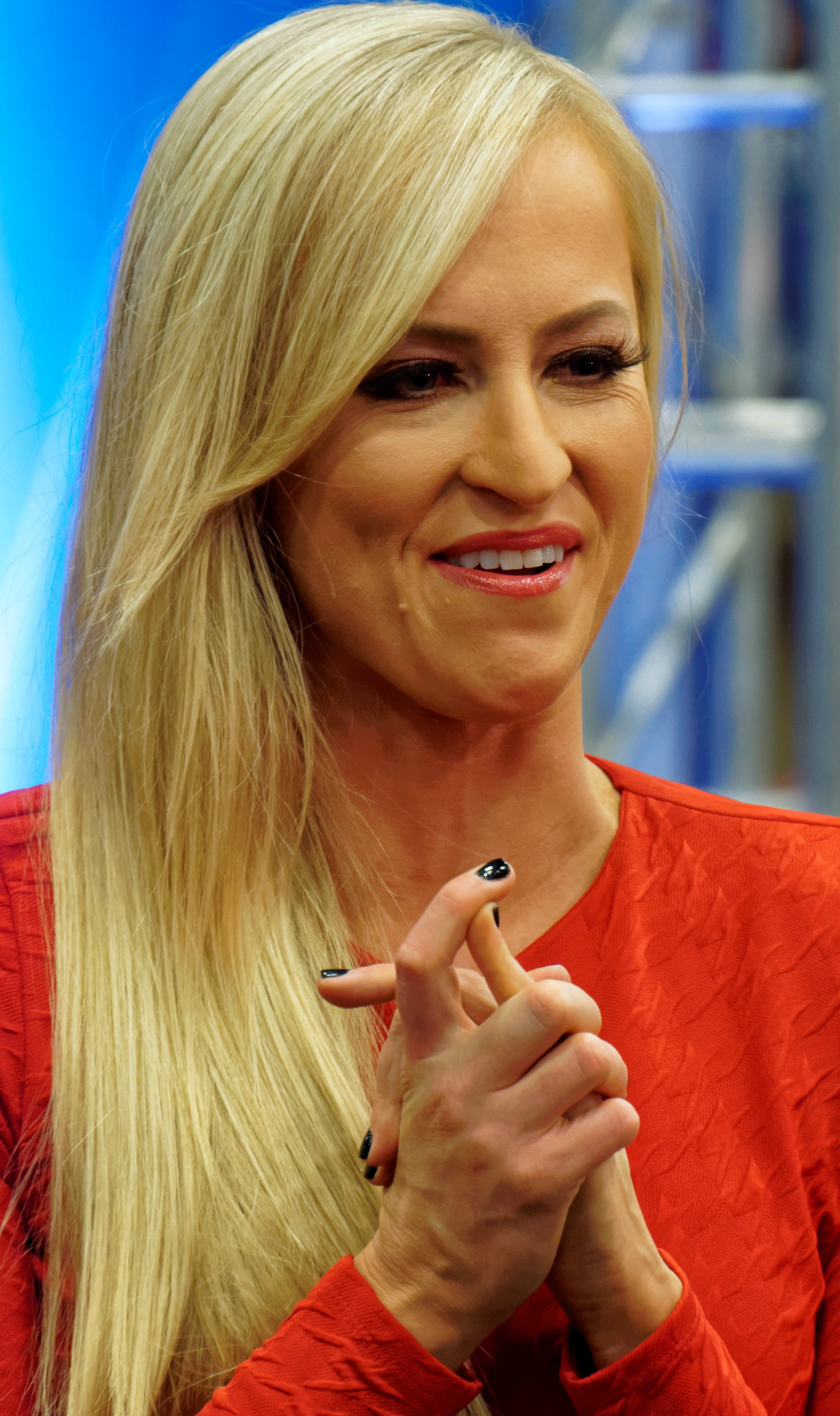
Rae in 2016

In June, Rae became involved with Rusev's storyline with his former manager Lana and Ziggler, in which Rae formed an on-screen relationship with Rusev. After weeks of confrontation, Rusev faced Ziggler at SummerSlam, which ended in a double countout due interference from both Lana and Rae. In September, Rae attempted to sabotage Ziggler and Lana's relationship, but the storyline was abruptly dropped. After Rusev refused Rae's marriage proposal, Rusev's real-life engagement to Lana was revealed, leading to Rae confronting Rusev and ending their association on the October 12 episode of Raw. Rae gained revenge over Rusev on the following episode of SmackDown when she served as the guest referee for his match against Ziggler; she helped Ziggler. On the October 22 episode of SmackDown, during a Miz TV segment between Rae and Ziggler, she introduced the debuting Tyler Breeze as her "new man", and subsequently began managing him. However, during the final SmackDown of 2015, Rae and Breeze announced that they amicably decided to go their separate ways.

Rae returned to in-ring action in mid-February 2016 competing in various matches, where she was on the losing side. In late March, Rae allied herself with Team B.A.D. (Naomi and Tamina), Emma and Lana, leading to a tag team match on the WrestleMania 32 pre show, which Rae's team lost. On July 19, Rae was drafted to Raw as part of the 2016 WWE draft. However, she never appeared for the brand due to injuries. After over a year of inactivity, Rae was officially released from her WWE contract on October 29, 2017.

=== Independent circuit (2018) ===
Seven months after her WWE departure, Moinet made her independent circuit debut in a Battle Championship Wrestling event on May 25 at the Whitehorse Club Function & Convention Centre in Burwood East, Victoria, Australia, where she faced NXT alumni Ivelisse (formerly Sofia Cortez) in a losing effort.

=== Sporadic WWE appearances (2022) ===
Summer Rae made her first televised appearance after a five year absence on the January 21, 2022 episode of SmackDown, where she was billed as a WWE legend, taunting Natalya during her match, playing up their rivalry from Total Divas. She made her in-ring return on the number 23 spot in the 2022 Royal Rumble going straight to attack Natalya but was quickly eliminated by her in under 60 seconds.

Later, she also attended the WrestleMania 38 pre-show party.

== Other media ==
Rae has appeared in six WWE video games. She made her in-game debut at WWE 2K14 as a DLC and appears in WWE 2K15, WWE 2K16, WWE 2K17, and WWE 2K18. She also appeared in the mobile game WWE SuperCard.

In 2014, Rae was a main cast member on Total Divas for the show's second and third seasons. Rae also starred in the 2015 film The Marine 4: Moving Target alongside The Miz.

In 2023, Rae was a board member of the cryptocurrency wallet Prime Trust which was placed into receivership by regulators in Nevada with consumers suffering losses of over $80 million and the state attorney investigating misuse of client funds.

== Filmography ==
=== Film ===
Year	Title	Role	Notes
2015	The Marine 4: Moving Target	Dawes	
2020	Beckman	Isabel	

=== Television ===
Year	Title	Role	Notes
2014–2017	Total Divas	Herself	Main cast (seasons 2–3); Recurring (seasons 4–6): 38 episodes
2015	Swerved	Herself	2 episodes
2016	Ride Along	Herself	1 episode
2016	WWE 24	Herself	Episode: “Women’s Evolution”

== Championships and accomplishments ==
- Live Audio Wrestling End of Year Awards
  - Worst Non-Wrestling Performer (2015)
- Rolling Stone
  - Worst Storyline (2015) With Rusev vs. Dolph Ziggler/Lana
- WrestleCrap
  - Gooker Award (2015) - feud with Rusev and Lana/Dolph Ziggler
- Wrestling Observer Newsletter
  - Worst Worked Match of the Year (2013) with AJ Lee, Aksana, Alicia Fox, Kaitlyn, Rosa Mendes, and Tamina Snuka vs. Eva Marie, JoJo, Natalya, The Bella Twins (Brie Bella and Nikki Bella), and The Funkadactyls (Cameron and Naomi) at Survivor Series
- WWE
  - FCW General Manager

== See also ==
- List of female American football players
- List of gridiron football players who became professional wrestlers
- List of multi-sport athletes
- Women in WWE
