= Eva Marie =

American professional wrestler (born 1984)

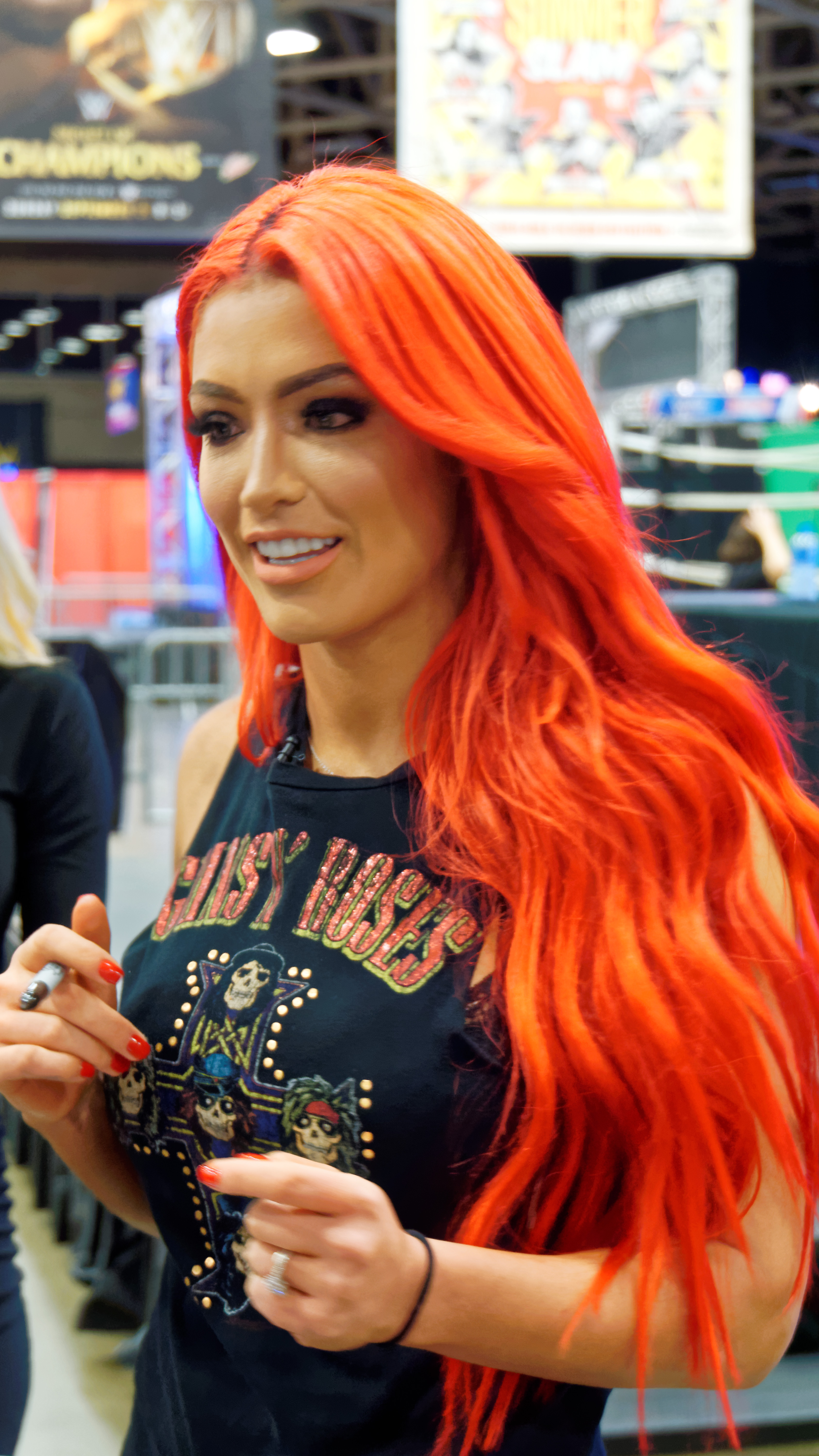
- Marie in 2016
- Born: Natalie Eva Marie Nelson; September 19, 1984 (age 42); Walnut Creek, California, U.S.
- Education: Diablo Valley College
- Occupations: Media personality; professional wrestler; model; actress; businesswoman
- Spouse: Jonathan Coyle (m. 2014; div. 2024)
- Professional wrestling career
- Ring name: Eva Marie
- Billed height: 5 ft 8 in (1.73 m)
- Billed from: Concord, California
- Trained by: WWE Performance Center; Brian Kendrick
- Debut: July 1, 2013
- Website: natalieevamarie.com

Natalie Eva Marie Nelson (born September 19, 1984) is an American media personality, professional wrestler, model, actress and businesswoman. She is best known for her tenures in WWE from 2013–2017 and 2020–2021, where she performed under the ring name Eva Marie.

In 2013, she signed a contract with WWE and was assigned to the WWE Performance Center in Orlando, Florida to begin her training. In July 2013, she made her main roster debut and became the manager of The Bella Twins later that month. She also began starring in WWE's reality television series Total Divas as part of the main cast. In mid-2015, she started to wrestle on WWE's developmental brand, NXT. In April 2016, Marie returned to the main roster, officially becoming a part of the SmackDown brand in July 2016. She left WWE in August 2017. That same year, Marie made her film debut in Inconceivable. The following years saw her taking on several other projects, which included appearances in multiple television shows and launching a fitness program, in addition to a fashion line, under her NEM brand. After signing a new contract with WWE in late 2020, Marie returned to the promotion in June 2021 on the Raw brand. In November, it was reported she had been released during a mass layoff, just as she had been written off TV to resume and focus on her acting career, similarly to her previous exit from the company.

== Early life ==
Natalie Eva Marie Nelson was born in the San Francisco Bay Area suburb of Walnut Creek, California, the youngest child of Barry and Josie Nelson. Her mother is Mexican, while her father is Italian. She has three older brothers (Nathan, Neal and Nick) and was raised in Concord, California. She wanted to become a professional soccer player, although her plans were put on hold when she suffered an ankle injury in her senior year of high school in 2002. Eva Marie, who played as a striker, recovered and continued playing at Diablo Valley College in Pleasant Hill, California, where she received her associate degree in art.

She received Junior College All-American honors and transferred to Arizona State University, although a lack of self-confidence led her to stop playing. She transferred to California State University, Fullerton where the soccer coach persuaded her to play again. However, her National Collegiate Athletic Association eligibility had expired due to their "five-year clock" rule. Eva Marie later said that "I wouldn't have run into that problem if I just believed in myself from the start. Now that I'm older, I know it's so much better to have tried and maybe you fail, then to have never tried at all." She graduated with a Bachelor of Arts in business management and a minor in human resource and moved to Los Angeles to pursue a career in modeling, acting and promotional work.

== Professional wrestling career ==
=== WWE ===
==== Main roster (2013–2015) ====
Eva Marie has said that she came across a casting call for WWE "by chance" and, after impressing talent scouts, won a four-week tryout. She then signed a developmental contract and was assigned to the WWE Performance Center in Orlando, Florida, to begin her training. In May 2013, she joined WWE and E!'s new reality show entitled Total Divas, that would show behind-the-scenes footage of select WWE Divas and a look into their personal lives. She was also promoted to the main roster, having had just two weeks of formal training, which Eva Marie called a "whirlwind experience" which "changed my life immediately." She dyed her natural brown hair bright red and adopted her ring name. Eva Marie made her main roster debut on the July 1 episode of Raw, in a backstage segment along with her fellow Total Divas co-stars. Eva Marie accompanied Natalya to the ring on the July 4 episode of Superstars, where she defeated Naomi.

Eva Marie, along with the cast of Total Divas appeared on MizTV on the July 22 episode of Raw, where she slapped Jerry Lawler, claiming to make a name for herself and establishing herself as a heel in the process. Upon the debut of Total Divas program in July 2013, The Bella Twins began feuding with their co-star on the show, Natalya, with Eva Marie becoming Brie's valet. She also was her partner at Summerslam Axxess in a tag team match against Natalya and Maria Menounos. The cast of Total Divas then transitioned into a scripted feud with WWE Divas Champion AJ Lee, who mocked the show and cast, turning both The Bellas and Eva Marie faces in the process. Eva Marie competed in six-woman tag team matches, including when Eva Marie gained an upset victory over Tamina Snuka by pinning her, garnering her first pinfall victory. Continuing their feud into November, the Total Divas defeated the "True Divas" (Alicia Fox, Aksana, AJ Lee, Kaitlyn, Rosa Mendes, Tamina Snuka and Summer Rae) in a traditional elimination tag team match at the Survivor Series pay-per-view, and again on the subsequent Raw.

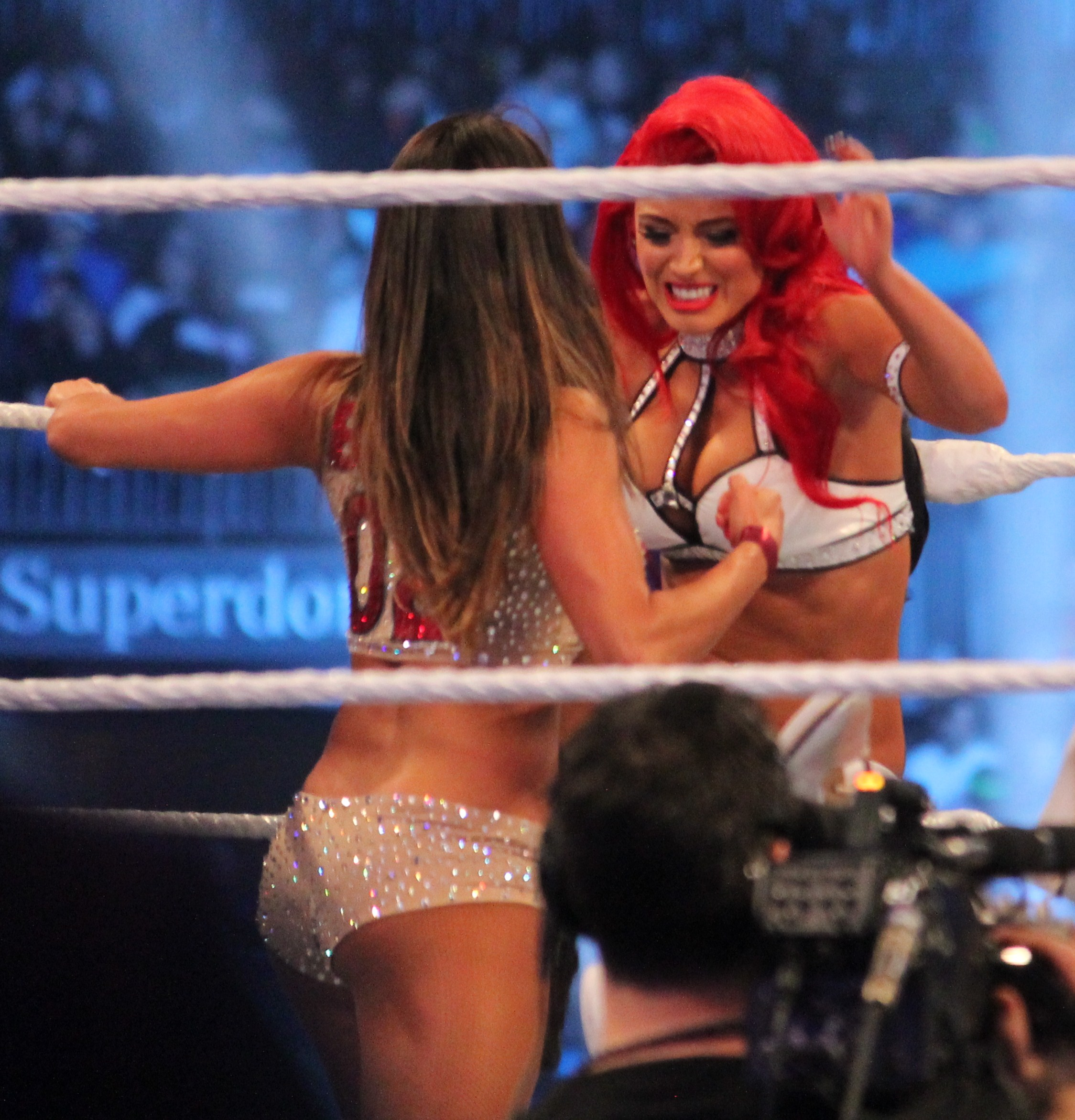
Marie wrestling Nikki Bella (front) at the WrestleMania XXX event in April 2014

Eva Marie made her return to WWE after a nearly three-month absence on the February 14, 2014 episode of SmackDown, defeating Alicia Fox in her first singles match on WWE television. The match, however, was cut from the broadcast. After returning in early 2014, Marie began regularly participating in tag team matches, including getting a win over AJ Lee and Tamina Snuka. On April 6, Eva Marie made her WrestleMania debut, competing at WrestleMania XXX in the 14–Diva "Vickie Guerrero Invitational match" for the WWE Divas Championship, which was won by the defending champion AJ Lee. In late May, Eva Marie was placed in a feud with the returning Summer Rae, who had cost Eva Marie a tag team match, leading to Eva Marie defeating Summer Rae in her in-ring return after an interference by Fandango and Layla on the May 26 episode of Raw.

Eva Marie was then placed in a feud with Divas Champion AJ Lee, facing AJ in two non-title matches on SmackDown and Raw, which AJ won. In July, Eva Marie turned heel when she became involved in Stephanie McMahon's ongoing storyline with The Bella Twins by regularly participating in handicap match as a part of McMahon's punishment against Nikki, including picking up the win for her team after a DDT. Eva Marie also participated in a staged match which ended in a beat down when Eva Marie and Alicia Fox attacked Nikki. Eva Marie made her first appearance on NXT on August 7, where she was defeated by Bayley. She faced Divas Champion AJ Lee in non-title bouts on the August 11 episode of Raw and August 15 episode of SmackDown. She emerged victorious via pinfall and countout, respectively, following distractions by Paige.

On November 9, after a month of inactivity, Eva Marie wrote on her Instagram account that she was recovering from an injury. In the Total Divas episode "Twin Leaks", which aired on January 18, 2015, this injury was revealed to be a rupture in her breast implants. Eva Marie returned on the March 9 episode of Raw, accompanying Summer Rae to her match against AJ Lee. She went on another hiatus shortly after in order to train with former WWE Tag Team Champion Brian Kendrick.

==== NXT (2015–2016) ====
Eva Marie made an appearance on the June 3 episode of NXT, stating that she was looking forward to competing in the NXT women's division, while the NXT audience was heavily booing her. In a backstage segment with NXT general manager William Regal on the June 24 episode of NXT, Regal said he needed to see some proof that Eva Marie was ready to compete in the women's division. On the July 22 episode of NXT, Eva Marie defeated Cassie in her in–ring debut. Eva Marie then began competing at NXT live events where she ignited a feud with Carmella. This led to a match between the two at the special August 26 episode of NXT (taped during the NXT TakeOver: Brooklyn event), which Eva Marie won. Eva Marie then continued her winning streak, defeating the likes of Billie Kay, Carmella, and Liv Morgan. On the November 18 episode of NXT, Eva Marie challenged Bayley to a match for the NXT Women's Championship, which she received a week later, but was unsuccessful in winning the championship, despite interference from her ally Nia Jax and referee Charles Robinson. Two weeks later on the December 9 episode of NXT, Eva Marie accompanied Nia Jax to challenge Bayley for the NXT Women's Championship at NXT TakeOver: London.

On the January 13, 2016, episode of NXT, Eva Marie competed in a number one contender's battle royal, which was won by Carmella. On the February 10 episode of NXT, Eva Marie attempted to get her revenge on Carmella by attacking her and Bayley with Nia Jax, until Asuka made the save. Eva Marie and Nia Jax subsequently went on to defeat Bayley and Carmella in a tag team match on the February 24 episode of NXT. After a brief hiatus, Eva Marie made her return on the April 27 episode of NXT, losing to the NXT Women's Champion Asuka in a non-title match, on what would be her last match in NXT.

==== Return to main roster (2016–2017) ====
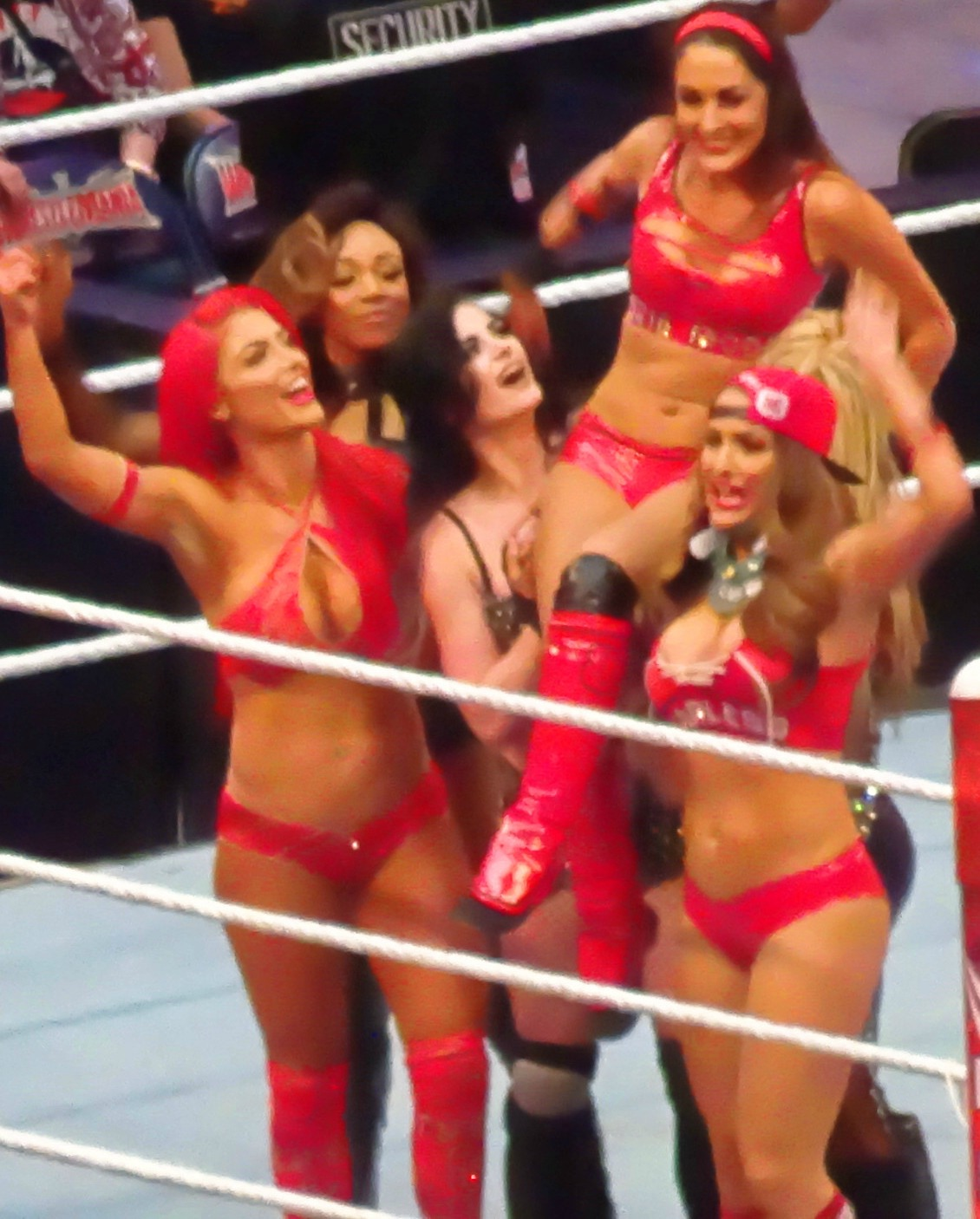
Eva Marie (far left) celebrating with her fellow Total Divas co-stars, their victory at WrestleMania 32 in April 2016

On the March 28 episode of Raw, Eva Marie made her return to the main roster as a face helping her fellow Total Divas co-stars over an assault against Lana's then-allies; Naomi, Tamina, Emma, and Summer Rae. As a result, a 10-Diva tag team match between the Total Divas team (Brie Bella, Alicia Fox, Natalya, Eva, and Paige) and the newly dubbed team B.A.D. & Blonde (Naomi, Tamina, Lana, Emma, and Rae) was scheduled for the WrestleMania 32 pre-show. At the event on April 3, Eva Marie's team won after Naomi submitted to Brie Bella.

Following a hiatus from live television and after being drafted to SmackDown as part of the 2016 WWE draft on July 19, Eva Marie made her first appearance for the brand on July 26, where she debuted a new long introductory entrance while confronting the brand female talents, re-establishing herself as a heel. Throughout August, Eva Marie began faking multiple unfortunate events in order to avoid in-ring competition. On August 18, she was suspended for 30 days for violating the company's wellness policy. Eva Marie said that she tested positive for Adderall and had a prescription for the medication, but submitted the paperwork after a WWE deadline. She was replaced by the returning Nikki Bella at SummerSlam on August 21 as part of a six-woman tag team match.

By February 10, 2017, Eva Marie had begun pursuing interests outside of wrestling and began removing WWE references from her social media accounts. In July, it was announced that she would not be returning to the seventh season of Total Divas. On August 4, 2017, Eva Marie announced that she and WWE had parted ways.

=== Return to WWE (2020–2021) ===
In October 2020, PWInsider reported that Marie had signed a contract with WWE. On the May 3, 2021 episode of Raw, a vignette aired advertising her return under a character of a "celebrity who wants to help other people", in which she promoted "the Eva-Lution".

After several weeks of vignettes, Marie returned on the June 14 episode of Raw, originally announced to face Naomi, only for an unnamed protégé to wrestle and defeat Naomi on her behalf. Post-match, Eva Marie announced herself as the winner, establishing herself as a heel. The following week on Raw, Marie subsequently renamed her protégé as Doudrop, but later that night, an annoyed Doudrop seemingly turned on Marie during a Money in the Bank qualifying tag team match against Asuka and Naomi, which resulted in Marie being pinned by the later. Despite this, the pair kept teaming up in tag team matches in following weeks where they would come out victorious, and Marie continuing to announce herself as the sole winner. This led to an appearance on the backstage segment Alexa's Playground with Marie later instructing Doudrop to attack Alexa Bliss on the July 12 episode of Raw, starting a feud between the three. Eva Marie lost to Alexa Bliss at SummerSlam. The same night, Doudrop turned on her. Marie would then confront and lose to Doudrop in singles matches on Raw in the following weeks. Marie's last appearance in WWE, occurred when she was involved in an injury angle on the September 27 edition of Raw, after being attacked by Shayna Baszler, who had begun using the steel steps to injure her opponents. A report later revealed the injury was a storyline to write her off TV so she could start production on a movie. On November 4, Marie was reportedly released by WWE, as part of a seventh round of layoffs that involved administrative staff and talent.

== Other media and career ==
Eva Marie appeared in a Fitness Blowout infomercial. In October, she was a part of the Marino Fitness Campaign and appeared in a Skechers commercial. She appeared on the Sports Illustrated website as the Lovely Lady of the Day in December 2012 and on several magazine covers including Rukus, Import Tuner Magazine, and Glam Fit Magazine. Eva Marie won the 2012 Powertech Model and several fashion competitions. She has modeled for Red Chapter Clothing. Eva Marie has appeared on the Spanish dating show 12 Corazones. She appeared in the September edition of Maxim magazine. In 2014, Marie ranked number 83 in Maxim's Hot 100.

In 2015, Eva Marie partnered with Bellami Hair to launch her own line of hair extensions, called TestaRossa. In 2016, Eva Marie launched her own fashion line, NEM Fashion. In alignment with its "female empowerment and anti-bullying" missions, the brand gives back to women in need through her NEM Foundation. She then launched Never End Denim, a luxury and size inclusive denim brand in 2017.

Eva Marie has appeared in two WWE video games. She made her in-game debut in WWE 2K16 and last appeared in WWE 2K17. She was also featured in several other WWE related merchandise, and received her own Mattel doll, a Funko Pop collectible and three action figures. Eva Marie has traveled to Afghanistan, Dubai, and Washington, D.C. to meet with U.S. military and their families, and accepted the "Corporate Leadership Award" at the Soldier Strong Annual Awards on behalf of WWE in November 2015.

In 2017, Eva Marie took part in a four-person tournament at the ELEAGUE Street Fighter V Invitational alongside Shaquille O'Neal, Lupe Fiasco and Reggie Bush. She supported the American Cancer Society in the exhibition. She returned in the following edition on behalf of A21. In 2018, she participated in the 50K Charity Challenge Celebrity Basketball Game presented by Monster Energy Outbreak at UCLA.

In September 2018, Eva Marie launched a podcast with her husband called The Natalie Eva Marie Show, with a rotating guest list on PodcastOne. She explained the idea came from having previously created a YouTube channel where she occasionally uploads lifestyle vlogs on various subjects, and needing a platform to discuss certain topics at more length. They launched a workout program NEM Fit on her website the following year.

In 2019, Eva Marie appeared as a cast member on the second season of the US version of Celebrity Big Brother. In April 2019, she was announced as the first ambassador for Monster Energy's Reign brand and was featured in campaigns and hosted sponsored events throughout the year. Later that year, she was also signed as an ambassador for Australian fitness and fashion brand Ryderwear and launched her own "Natalie Eva Marie x Ryderwear" collection in 2020. In an interview with Hook & Barrel Magazine in 2024, she stated that she was an avid hunter and ambassador for Christensen Arms.

In 2023, she joined The Hopeaholics, a podcast that promotes awareness about addiction and mental health, as a co-host. In the following year, she founded the NEM Recovery Centers, a rehabilitation facility in Laguna Beach.

== Filmography ==
Film
Year	Title	Role	Notes
2017	Inconceivable	Linda	Film debut
2017	Action #1	Bounty Hunter	Completed, no release date set
2020	Hard Kill	Sasha	
2023	Phoenix	Fiona 'Phoenix' Grant	Lead role

Television
Year	Title	Role	Notes
2013–2017	Total Divas	Herself	Main cast (seasons 1–6): 42 episodes
2015	The Soup	Herself	(season 12, episode 16)
2016	Miss Teen USA 2016	Herself	Guest judge
2017–2018	Celebrity Showdown	Herself	Competitor; runner-up
2019	Celebrity Big Brother	Herself	Houseguest; 7th place
2020	Where Are They Now?	Herself	WWE Network series
2020	Faces and Heels	Herself	Host
2021	Paradise City	Jade	American Satan spinoff series
2021	American Ninja Warrior Junior	Herself	Guest

== Personal life ==
Eva Marie married Jonathan Coyle, a fitness coach and business co-owner of NEMfashion, in 2014. Coyle proposed after a few months of dating as documented in Total Divas. Eva Marie describes herself as an avid San Francisco Giants fan. She struggled with underage alcohol abuse, which was discussed in an episode of Total Divas. She elaborated further in 2018, admitting to having spent three months in jail for several DUIs prior to joining WWE. Eva Marie got breast implants when she was 20. In December 2024, she filed for divorce from Coyle citing "irreconcilable differences".

== Championships and accomplishments ==
=== Fitness modeling ===
- Powertech Model & Fitness Competition (2012)

=== Professional wrestling ===
- Pro Wrestling Illustrated
  - Ranked No. 50 of the top 50 female wrestlers in the PWI Female 50 in 2016
  - Ranked No. 4 in PWI's Most Hated Wrestler of the Year (2016)
- Wrestling Observer Newsletter
  - Worst Worked Match of the Year (2013) with AJ Lee, Aksana, Alicia Fox, Kaitlyn, Rosa Mendes, and Tamina Snuka vs. Eva Marie, JoJo, Natalya, The Bella Twins (Brie Bella and Nikki Bella), and The Funkadactyls (Cameron and Naomi) at Survivor Series
- WWE
  - WWE Diva Search (2013)

== Awards and nominations ==
Year	Award	Category	Result
2017	Lifestyle Influencer of the Year	the American Influencer Award	Nominated
