= Funkadactyls =

Professional wrestling tag team

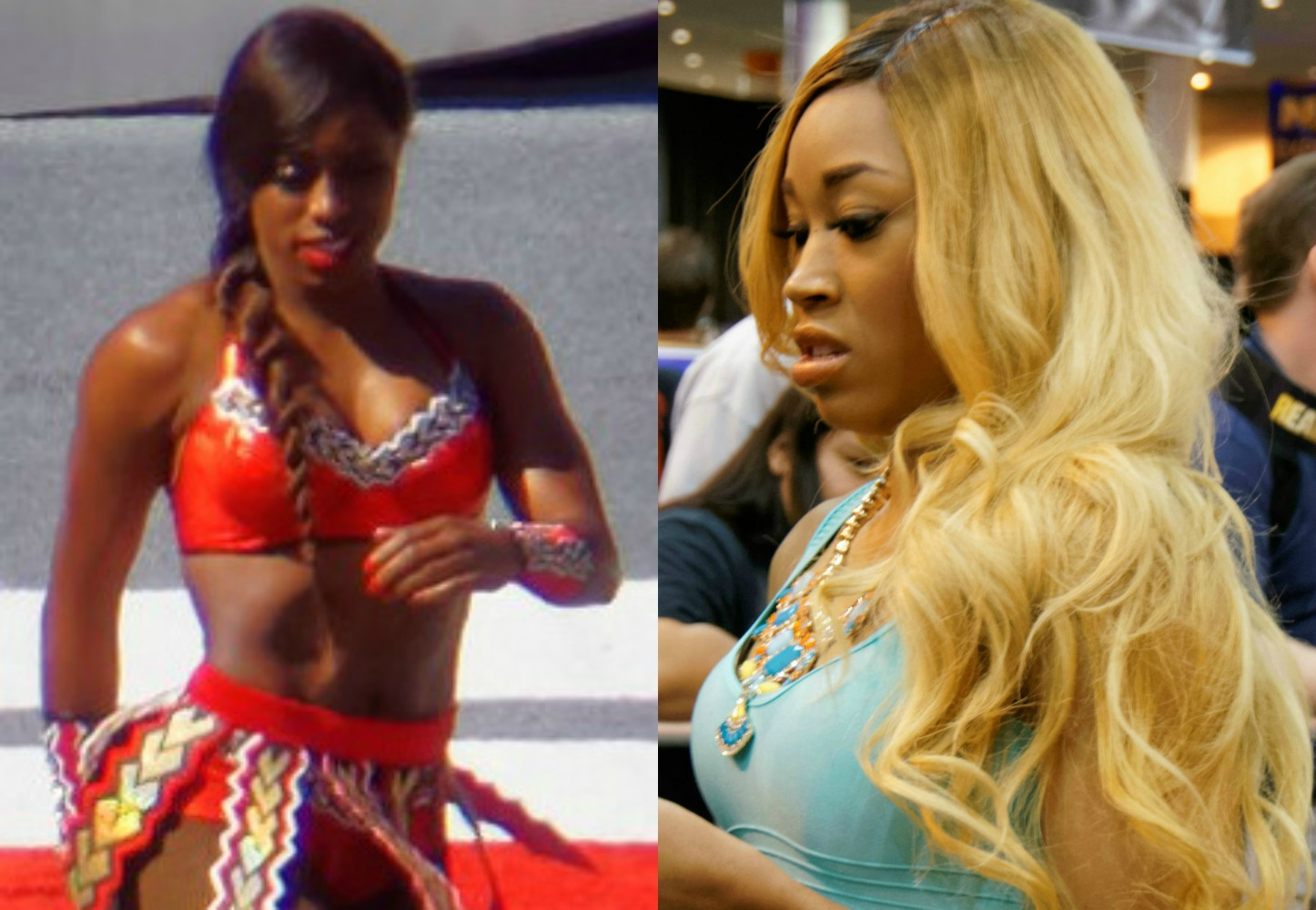
- Naomi (left) and Cameron (right)

Statistics
- Members: Naomi; Cameron
- Name(s): Booty Poppin' Dance Group; The Funkadactyls
- Billed from: Planet Funk
- Debut: August 18, 2011
- Disbanded: July 7, 2014
- Years active: 2011–2014
- Trained by: Florida Championship Wrestling

The Funkadactyls were a professional wrestling tag team consisting of Trinity Fatu and Ariane Andrew. The women initially worked for WWE as the dancers and valets of Brodus Clay in 2012–2013, but they soon separated to act alone in the women's division.

The duo was first formed in WWE's former developmental territory Florida Championship Wrestling (FCW) where they managed Byron Saxton. They made their main roster debut on the January 9, 2012 episode of Raw accompanying Brodus Clay. They made their in-ring debut on December 16, 2012 during the pre-show of TLC in a Battle Royal. They joined the reality show Total Divas where they began to feud with AJ Lee and Tamina Snuka.

== History ==
=== Booty Poppin' Dance Group (2011–2012) ===
On the August 18 episode of FCW Television, Cameron and Naomi competed against Aksana and Maxine in a losing effort. On the September 8 episode of FCW Television, Cameron and Naomi defeated Aksana and the debuting Leah West. On the October 9, 2011, episode of FCW Television, Cameron Lynn and Byron Saxton accompanied McCray to ringside during her match against the Leah West. Naomi and Cameron debuted as heel characters on the October 23 episode of FCW Television, where they faced Caylee Turner and Kaitlyn in a winning effort when Naomi pinned Turner after a leg lariat. On the November 10 episode of FCW Television, Cameron and Naomi teamed up with Audrey Marie in a winning effort defeating Caylee Turner, Ivelisse Velez and Raquel Diaz.

=== Valets of Brodus Clay and feud with The Bella Twins (2012–2013) ===
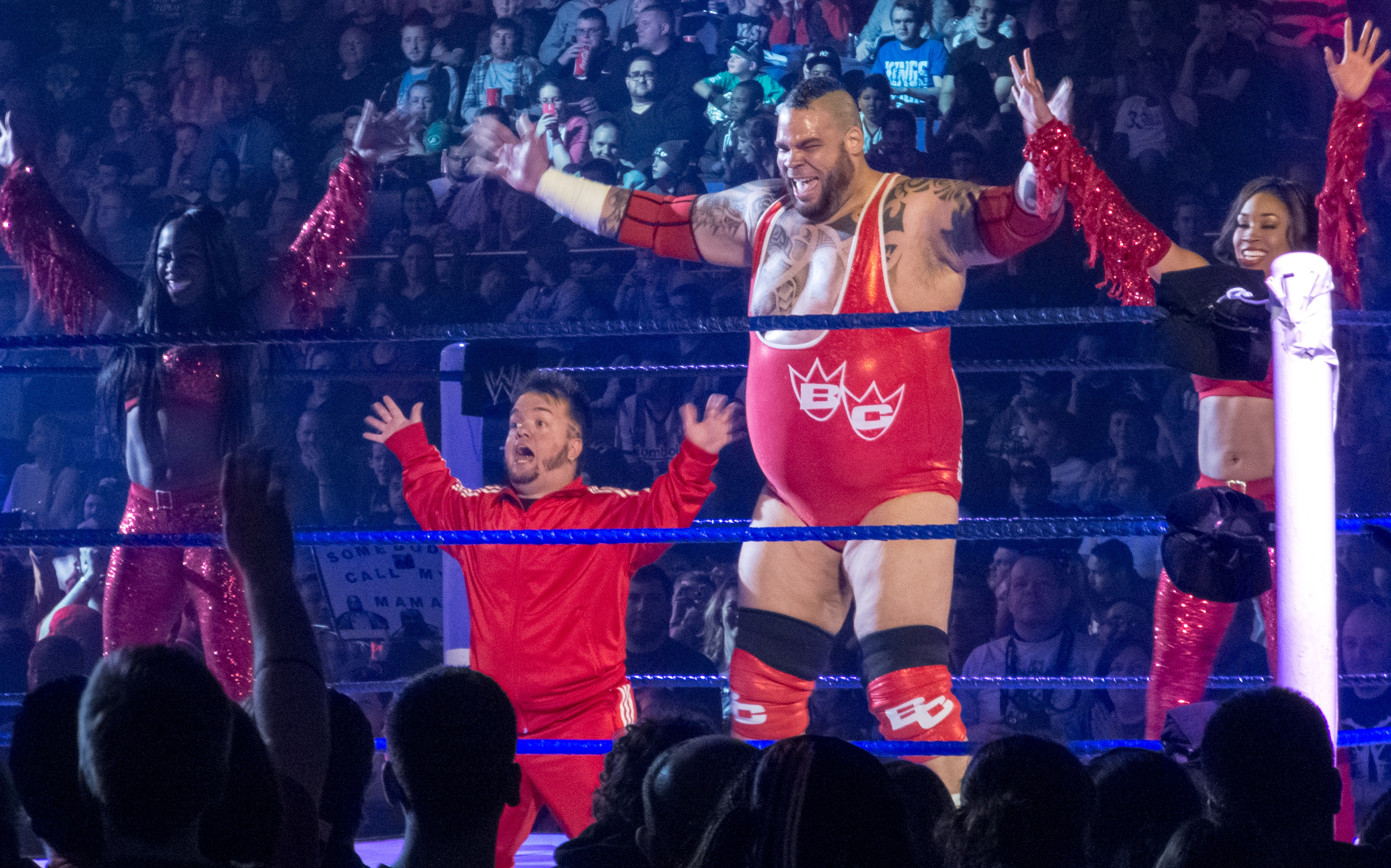
The Funkadactyls at the ring along Brodus Clay and Hornswoggle in 2012

On the January 9, 2012 episode of Raw, Cameron and Naomi made their main roster WWE debut as the dancers and valets The Funkadactyls for the returning Brodus Clay. They made their WrestleMania debut at WrestleMania XXVIII during a segment with Clay where they came out a danced on stage with Brodus, his "momma" and her friends. On the April 20 episode of SmackDown, The Funkadactyls and Clay began a brief association with Hornswoggle. At the pre-show of the TLC pay-per-view on December 16, 2012, The Funkadactyls participated in their first televised WWE match, which was a "Santa's Little Helpers" battle royal which was won by Naomi, but later she lost a title match for the WWE Divas Championship to the current champion Eve Torres later that night.

On the February 6 episode of WWE Main Event, The Funkadactyls got into a backstage altercation with Tamina Snuka and Aksana after Snuka and Aksana began to persuade Brodus Clay to fire The Funkadactyls and hire them as his backup dancers. This led to their first tag team match in which they defeated Snuka and Aksana.

The Funkadactyls finally faced off in tag-team competition against The Bella Twins on the March 27 episode of WWE Main Event, where The Bella Twins emerged victorious when Nikki Bella pinned Naomi after an interference by Cody Rhodes. On the April 1 episode of Raw, The Funkadactyls were defeated by The Bella Twins after Brie Bella reversed Cameron's crossbody block attempt. Brodus Clay, Tensai and The Funkadactyls against The Bella Twins and Team Rhodes Scholars (Cody Rhodes and Damien Sandow) at WrestleMania 29 in an eight–person mixed tag team match, however the match was cancelled because of time restraints. On the March 21 episode of NXT which aired on April 10, The Funkadactyls were defeated by The Bella Twins when Nikki pinned Cameron after The Bellas performed a tag-team move on Cameron. On the April 12 episode of SmackDown, The Funkadactyls teamed up with Kaitlyn faced The Bella Twins and Tamina Snuka when Nikki pinned Naomi after an interference by Brie. On the April 29 episode of Raw, Naomi was defeated by Brie following "Twin Magic" but then Cameron complained with the referee disqualified The Bella Twins despite not seeing the switch. In retaliation, The Bella Twins focused on attacking Cameron for costing them the win.

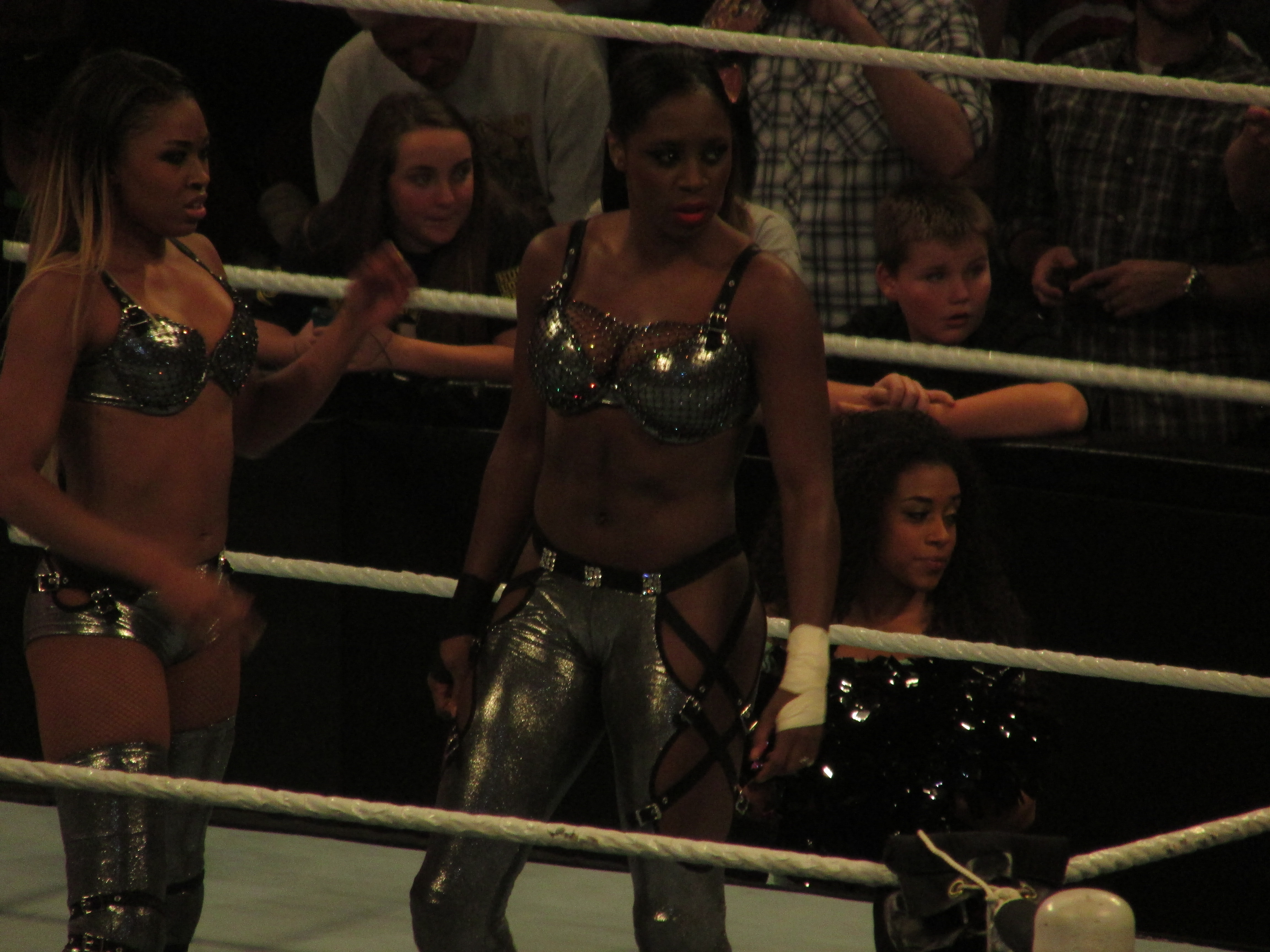
Cameron and Naomi in the ring on Raw in September, 2013

=== Total Divas storylines (2013–2014) ===
The cast of Total Divas entered a feud with WWE Divas Champion — AJ Lee on the August 26 episode Raw, after Natalya's match with Brie Bella, when AJ Lee interrupted and declared war on the Total Divas against the "real" hard earning Divas. On the November 22 episode of SmackDown, The Funkadactyls defeated AJ Lee in handicap match, despite the interference from Tamina Snuka. The Total Divas defeated "The True Divas" (Foxsana, AJ, Kaitlyn, Rosa Mendes, Tamina and Summer Rae) in a traditional survivor series elimination tag-team match at the Survivor Series pay-per-view and the following night on an episode of Raw. The Funkadactyls were nominated for Diva of the Year, which was won by The Bella Twins, however they won Best Dance Moves against Fandango, R-Truth, Summer Rae, The Great Khali and Miz-co Inferno. Naomi was also nominated for Couple of the Year with Jimmy Uso, but the award was won by Daniel Bryan and Brie Bella.

On December 15 at the TLC pay-per-view, The Funkadactyls and Tensai, abandoned Brodus Clay because of his attitude, effectively disbanding Tons of Funk. The following night on an episode of Raw, The Funkadactyls aligned themselves with R-Truth and Xavier Woods and started managing them to their matches. On the December 24 episode of Raw, The Total Divas defeated Aksana, Alicia Fox, Kaitlyn, Summer Rae and Tamina Snuka. On the December 30 episode of Raw, The Funkadactyls teamed up with The Bella Twins and Eva Marie in a losing effort to Aksana, Alicia Fox, Kaitlyn, Summer Rae and Rosa Mendes after Aksana pinned Nikki following a distraction from Mendes.

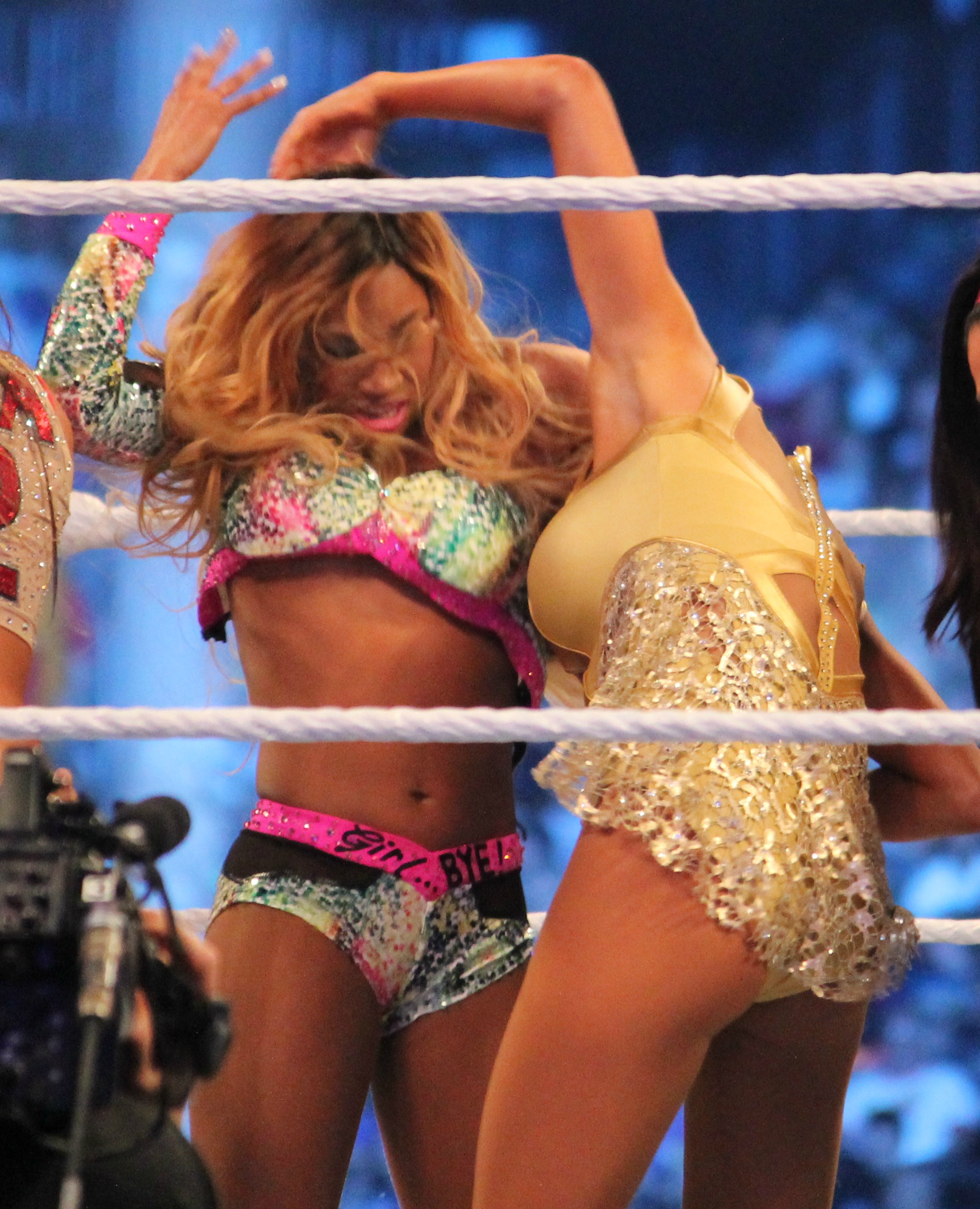
Cameron wrestling Rosa Mendes at the WrestleMania XXX event in April 2014

Naomi received a push and defeated AJ in various tag team matches on both Raw and SmackDown. However their rivalry was cut shortly after Naomi suffered an eye injury during her match with Aksana on the February 3 episode of Raw. On the February 10 episode of Raw, Cameron pinned Aksana during a six-Divas tag team match, and once again on the February 19 episode of Main Event in a singles match. On February 23 at the Elimination Chamber, Cameron received her first shot at the WWE Divas Championship, a match which she won via disqualification after Tamina Snuka attacked her. Five days later on Smackdown, Cameron would receive another shot at the title, but was unsuccessful. Naomi would make her return after her eye injury, teaming with Cameron in a tag team match against AJ Lee and Tamina Snuka, which they would win, when Naomi pinned AJ. On April 6, at WrestleMania XXX, The Funkadactyls unsuccessfully competed in the 14-Diva "Vickie Guerrero Invitational" match, where AJ forced Naomi give tapout after the Black Widow to retain her title.

=== Dissension and split (2014) ===
Cameron was later inserted in a feud with the new WWE Divas Champion Paige after she interrupted Paige's speech during her press conference at the Payback post-show. This led to a non-title match on the 5 June episode of Superstars where Paige defeated Cameron, who began turning heel during the match. In a rematch, Paige once again defeated Cameron via submission on the 16 June edition of Raw. The following night, on Main Event, Paige was defeated by Naomi in a non-title match. After the match ended, the evil Cameron shoved Paige, and Paige attacked Cameron while Naomi just watched the cat fight without interfering. On the June 27 episode of SmackDown, Cameron once again attacked and lost to Paige in a non title match, but with Naomi interfering to separate. After the catfight, Paige turned her back to Naomi and Cameron, which led to Cameron pushing Naomi on to Paige, and Paige thinking that Naomi had attacked her, creating tension between them for the Money in the Bank, where she lost the match. The next night on Raw, The Funkadactyls defeated Nikki Bella in a handicap match, where they had a disagreement after the match. On the following evening on Main Event, The Funkadactyls faced Nikki in a tag team match with Alicia Fox which was put by Stephanie McMahon to do her dirty work attacking Nikki during combat making Cameron capture the victory. On July 7 on Raw, they lost a tag team match against the Divas Champion AJ Lee and Paige after Cameron was pinned by Paige. After the match, they quarreled ending in a catfight separated by the referee, signalizing the end of the Funkadactyls and cementing Cameron as a villainess. The feud reached its peak with Cameron defeating Naomi at the Battleground kickoff. The two would continue having matches going forward, with Naomi always picking up the win.

== Other media ==
The Funkadactyls were featured as main cast members of Total Divas in its first season, along with Natalya, Eva Marie, JoJo Offerman, Summer Rae, Rosa Mendes and The Bella Twins. Cameron and Naomi continued to appear on the show until Naomi exited the show in season three. The Funkadactyls appeared on E! News to share their workout tips and promote the premiere of "Total Divas" on E!. It was revealed on November 20, 2013, that Total Divas has been renewed for a second season. They appeared on the November 15 episode of The JBL and Cole Show, doing a loveline segment. The Funkadactyls along with The Bellas appeared on The Steve Harvey Show.

== Championships and accomplishments ==
- Pro Wrestling Illustrated
  - PWI ranked Naomi No. 24 of the best 50 female singles wrestlers in the PWI Female 50 in 2013
  - PWI ranked Cameron No. 37 of the best 50 female singles wrestlers in the PWI Female 50 in 2013
- Wrestling Observer Newsletter
  - Worst Worked Match of the Year (2013) with Eva Marie, JoJo, Natalya, and The Bella Twins (Brie Bella and Nikki Bella) vs. AJ Lee, Aksana, Alicia Fox, Kaitlyn, Rosa Mendes, Summer Rae, and Tamina Snuka on November 24
- WWE
  - Slammy Award (1 time)
    - Best Dance Moves of the Year (2013)
