= Buggy Nova =

American professional wrestler and valet (born 1989)

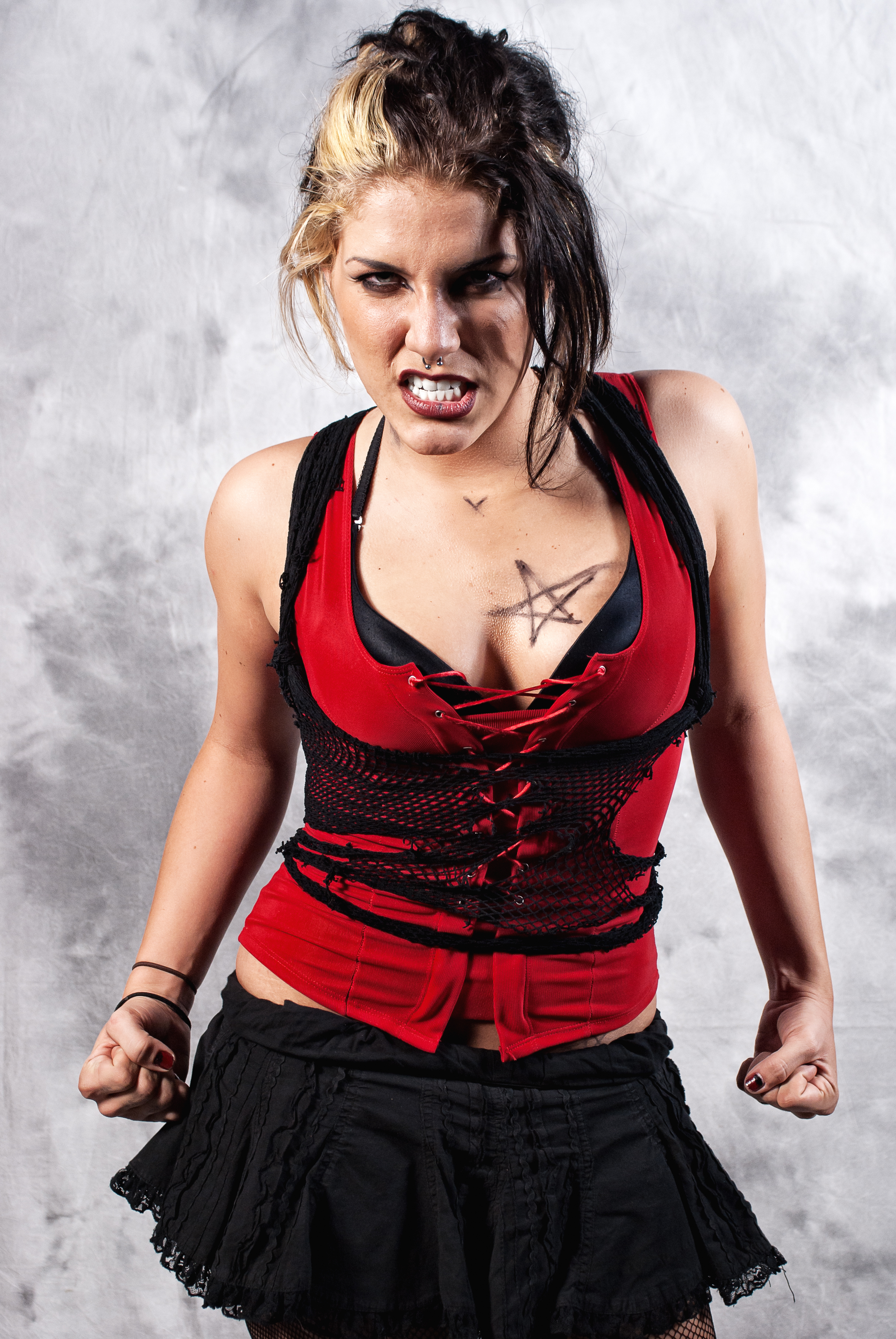
- Osman in 2010

Personal information
- Born: Natalie Laura Osman; November 18, 1989 (age 36) Riverside, California, U.S.

Professional wrestling career
- Ring name(s): Skyler Moon; Natalie; Donna Dead; Buggy Nova; Buggy
- Billed height: 5 ft 8 in (1.73 m)
- Billed weight: 140 lb (64 kg)
- Billed from: Candyland; Dreamsfear, California
- Trained by: Josh Selby; The Ballard Brothers; Van Ayasit
- Debut: February 2009
- Retired: 2020

Natalie Laura Osman (born November 18, 1989) is an American professional wrestler and valet. She is known both for working for WWE in their developmental territory NXT, under the ring name Skyler Moon, and for working for Southern California independent promotions including National Wrestling Alliance, Pro Wrestling Bushido, Mach One Wrestling, Empire Wrestling Federation, as well as Shimmer Women Athletes under the names Buggy Nova, or simply Buggy.

== Professional wrestling career ==
=== Early career (2009–2010) ===
Osman began training with Josh Selby. She later began training at the Santino Bros. Wrestling – Pro Wrestling School, with The Ballard Brothers and Van Ayasit. She debuted in February 2009.

Osman made her debut for Mach One Wrestling (M1W) on the May 22, 2010 at the M1W's Showcase, where she teamed up with Christina Von Eerie in a losing effort to Candice LeRae and Kitana Vera in a tag-team match. Osman made her singles debut on the June 5 edition of M1W Television, where Osman competed against Kitana Vera, in winning effort. At the M1W's Centre City Slam event on July 24, Osman competed against LeRae, in a losing effort.

Osman has competed for numerous independent promotions during her career, including Pro Wrestling Bushido (PWB), Mach One Wrestling (M1W), Big Time Wrestling (BTW), Vendetta Pro Wrestling (VPW), Pro Wrestling Destination (PWD), Insane Wrestling League (IWL) and Empire Wrestling Federation (EWF).

She debuted for Shimmer Women Athletes as part of the SPARKLE Division teaming with Bonesaw and She Nay Nay defeating Kimberly Maddox, Su Yung and Veda Scott. The next day she competed in a tag team match with December losing to the team of Jett Riley and Kimberly Maddox.

=== National Wrestling Alliance (2010–2011) ===
Osman made her debut for National Wrestling Alliance (NWA), on October 6, 2010, where she competed against Lucky O'Shea, in a winning effort. On the December 8, 2010 edition of NWA Tapings, Osman competed against Nikki, in a winning effort. On the January 8, 2011 edition of NWA Tapings, Osman teamed up with Thunderkitty against Lucky O'Shea and Tab Jackson, in a winning effort. Later that event, Osman would defeat O'Shea in a singles match.

On the February 12 edition of NWA Tapings, Osman lost her first match against Candice LeRae. On the March 6 edition of NWA Tapings, Osman competed against Allison Danger, in a losing effort. On the April 10 edition of NWA Tapings, Osman defeated LeRae by disqualification. On the April 10 edition of NWA Tapings, Osman teamed up with Davina Rose in a winning effort defeating Allison Danger and Candice LeRae in a tag-team match. On the May 15 edition of NWA Tapings, Osman defeated Rose in a singles match. On the June 5 edition of NWA Tapings, Osman defeated Kitana Vera in singles match. On the July 10 edition of DWA Tapings, Osman defeated LeRae by disqualification in a Blindfold match. Later that event, Osman fought LeRae in rematch, that ended in a no-contest, this would be her last match in this promotion.

=== Alternative Wrestling Show (2010–2011) ===
Osman made her debut for Alternative Wrestling Show (AWS), on February 28, 2010, at the AWS's Moving Up the Ladder event, where she teamed up with Christina Von Eerie in a losing effort to The Ballard Brothers (Shane Ballard and Shannon Ballard) in an intergender tag-team match. Osman made her singles debut at the AWS's The Anniversary Is Over event on April 18, where she competed against Candice LeRae, in a losing effort. At the AWS's Lethal Lottery event on April 25, Buggy became the number one contender for the AWS Heavyweight Championship after winning a Lethal Lottery Battle Royal. Later that event, she challenged Johnny Paradise for the AWS Heavyweight Championship but was unsuccessful in capturing the title.

At the AWS's Annual Women's Tournament event on May 5, Osman defeated Claudia del Solis in the first round of the tournament before losing to Candice LeRae in the semi-finals of the tournament. At the AWS's Bart's Birthday Bash event on June 19, Osman teamed up with Claudia del Solis against Aiden Riley and Kitana Vera, in a winning effort. Later that event, Osman competed in World War III 159 Man Battle Royal. At the AWS/EWF's United Forces event on December 8, Osman teamed up with Claudia del Solis to defeat Aiden Riley and Candice LeRae with Human Tornado as the special guest referee.

=== WWE (2012–2013) ===
In early 2012, Osman wrestled in a tryout dark match at WWE's Raw and SmackDown television tapings, against AJ. She made her debut for Florida Championship Wrestling (FCW) on June 20, 2012, edition of FCW Television, where she competed in a bikini contest, won by Summer Rae. On June 21, 2012, Osman signed a developmental contract with WWE. On the June 21 episode of FCW Television, Osman teamed up with Sofia Cortez in a losing effort to Audrey Marie and Caylee Turner. On the June 22 episode of FCW Television, Osman teamed up with Paige in a losing effort to Cortez and Turner. On July 14 episode of FCW, she competed in another bikini contest. On the July 19 episode of FCW, Osman teamed up with Summer Rae in a winning effort against Sofia Cortez and Paige. On the August 1 episode of FCW Television, Osman unsuccessfully competed in a battle royal involving Tenille Tayla, Raquel Diaz, Paige, Turner, Cortez and Marie, this would turn out to be Osman last match in FCW.

Osman made her debut for NXT at the August 16 NXT taping, under the ring name Skyler Moon, where she teamed up with Raquel Diaz to defeat Paige and Emma in a divas tag-team match. On August 17 at an NXT House show, Moon teamed up with Paige in a winning effort defeating against Emma and Audrey Marie in a tag-team match. On January 11, 2013, it was reported that she was released from her developmental contract.

=== Independent circuit (2013–2020) ===
After her non-compete clause ended, Osman returned to the independent circuit under the Buggy Nova name. Her first appearance came at Full Impact Pro Establish Dominance in which she accompanied The Scene and was used to persuade Kenneth Cameron into joining them, which she failed to do. She wrestled her last match on February 20, 2020 just before the COVID-19 pandemic.

== Championships and accomplishments ==
- DDT Pro-Wrestling
  - Ironman Heavymetalweight Championship (1 time)
- Pro Wrestling Destination
  - PWD Women's Championship (1 time)
