= Alex Lee (wrestler) =

Japanese professional wrestler

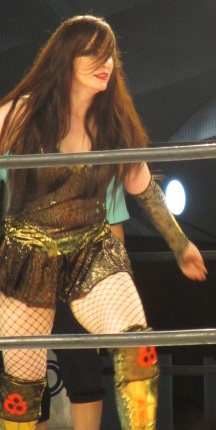
- Lee in June 2017

Personal information
- Born: June 24, 1985 (age 41) SR Bosnia and Herzegovina, Yugoslavia

Professional wrestling career
- Ring name(s): Irena Janjic; Leah West; Alex Lee
- Billed height: 165 cm (5 ft 5 in)
- Billed weight: 65 kg (143 lb)
- Billed from: Sarajevo, Bosnia and Hercegovina
- Trained by: Lance Storm
- Debut: 2010

Irena Janjic, better known by her ring name Alex Lee, is a Bosnian professional wrestler best known for her tenure with the Japanese professional wrestling promotions Sendai Girls' Pro Wrestling and Oz Academy. Irena the only foreign female professional wrestler to have wrestled full time as a freelancer in Japan for 10 years. During her career Irena has developed a style that is a combination of classic joshi puroresu and strong style. She is best known for an array of powerful kicks, strikes and suplexes. Due to her kickboxing background and long tenure on the Japanese women's wrestling scene she is known as "The Queen of Strong Style".

== Professional wrestling career ==
Irena started her professional wrestling training with former WWE, WCW and ECW superstar Lance Storm in Calgary, Alberta Canada. Irena spent 6 months training daily in the ring and made her professional wrestling debut on August 27, 2010 for PWA in Edmonton, Canada.

=== Independent circuit (2011–present) ===
While part of the Pure-J promotion, Janjic competed in a tournament for the Pure-J Openweight Championship. All the matches took place at house shows, and she started by defeating Rydeen Hagane on August 20, 2017, Leon on September 23, but lost to Hanako Nakamori in the semi-finals from October 9.

==== Florida Championship Wrestling (2011) ====
Janjic made her debut in Florida Championship Wrestling by the time when the promotion was still in relationships with WWE under the name of Leah West at FCW TV #158 on October 9, 2011, where she fell short to Naomi. She made sporadic appearances such as at the FCW TV #159 event where she unsuccessfully challenged Audrey Marie for the FCW Florida Divas Championship. On November 31, 2011, she teamed up with Aksana in a losing effort to Audrey Marie and Kaitlyn. Her last appearance in FCW was in a dark match which took place on FCW TV #159 where she got defeated by Cameron.

==== Oz Academy (2016–2018) ====
Janjic had a brief period in Oz Academy, promotion for which she debuted at OZ Academy Disorder on May 14, 2017, where she competed as part of the Ozaki-gun teaming up with fellow stablemates Maya Yukihi and Yumi Ohka in a losing effort to Aja Kong, Syuri Kondo and Yoshiko. An important confrontation was at OZ Academy Plum Hanasaku on August 20, 2017, where she teamed up with Yumi Ohka, unsuccessfully challenging Mission K4 (Akino and Kaho Kobayashi) for the Oz Academy Tag Team Championship. She participated at Manami Toyota 30th Anniversary, an event which portraited Manami Toyota's retirement on November 3, 2017, where she competed in a 50-woman gauntlet match where she and other 49 superstars unsuccessfully faced Toyota herself. She was involved in a last woman standing no. 1 contendership match for the Oz Academy Openweight Championship at The Wizard Of OZ 2018 event also involving Kaori Yoneyama and Rina Yamashita and Sonoko Kato, Yumi Ohka and the winner Akino.

==== Sendai Girls' Pro Wrestling (2014–2021) ====
Janjic started working for Sendai Girls' Pro Wrestling on June 22, 2014 at a house show hosted by the promotion, where she came short to La Comandante. A notable confrontation of her was at Sendai Girls Big Match In Niigata from October 18, 2014, where she teamed up with Kaho Kobayashi to defeat Dump Matsumoto and Yumiko Hotta. At a house show from August 26, 2018, Lee teamed up with Mika Iwata as Strong Style Rush and unsuccessfully challenged Cassandra Miyagi and Heidi Katrina for the Sendai Girls Tag Team Championship. She is known for competing in various multiple-person matches where she faced notable opponents. One of these appearances was at a house show of the promotion hosted on May 25, 2019, where in a 12-woman battle royal she competed against the winner Mika Iwata, Meiko Satomura, Chihiro Hashimoto, Dash Chisako, Hiroyo Matsumoto and others. At Joshi Puroresu Big Show In Sendai on October 13, 2019, Lee participated in an eight-woman battle royal also involving the winner Hikaru Shida, Jaguar Yokota, Mei Suruga and Kaoru.

==== World Wonder Ring Stardom (2015–2016) ====
Janjic debuted in World Wonder Ring Stardom on July 26, 2015 in a loss to Reo Hazuki. Another promotion which Janjic worked for was World Wonder Ring Stardom, where she made a notable appearance at Stardom 5STAR Grand Prix 2015 from September 4, where she teamed up with Sendai Sachiko in a losing effort to Mayu Iwatani and Kairi Hojo. Janjic participated in the 2015 Goddesses of Stardom Tag League, where on the fourth night which took place on November 8, she teamed up with Kaori Yoneyama, falling short to Thunder Rock (Io Shirai and Mayu Iwatani) in a first-round match. On the first night of Stardom New Years Stars 2016, she participated in a 15-women battle royal, also involving the winner Momo Watanabe, Dakota Kai, Kellie Skater, Hiromi Mimura and others. Another notable event in which she participated was the Stardom Cinderella Tournament 2016, where on April 29 she fell short to Santana Garrett in a first-round match. Janjic took part in the Stardom Premium Star Wars, a two night event starting on June 4, 2016, where she teamed up with Hiroyo Matsumoto, falling short to Candy Crush (Chelsea and Kairi Hojo). On the second night she teamed up with Azumi, scoring a defeat against Eimi Nishina and Natsumi Maki.

== Championships and accomplishments ==
- Pro Wrestling Alliance Queensland
  - AIWF Australian Women's Championship (1 time)
- Rings Of Europe
  - GLAM! Championship
