= FCW Divas Championship =

Professional wrestling women's championship

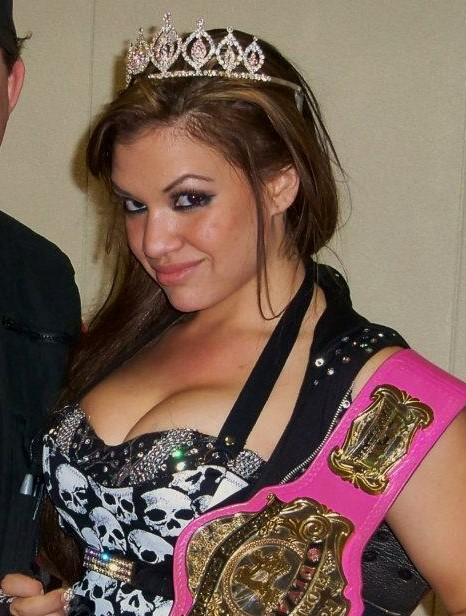
- Raquel Diaz, the longest reigning FCW Divas Champion, pictured with the title belt on the right on her shoulder.

Details
- Promotion: Florida Championship Wrestling
- Date established: June 10, 2010
- Date retired: August 14, 2012
Statistics
- First champion(s): Naomi Knight
- Final champion(s): Caylee Turner
- Most reigns: all titleholders (1 reign)
- Longest reign: Raquel Diaz (197 days)
- Shortest reign: Caylee Turner (43 days)
- Oldest champion: Aksana (29 years, 343 days)
- Youngest champion: Raquel Diaz (21 years, 62 days)
- Heaviest champion: Aksana; 128 lb (58 kg)
- Lightest champion: AJ Lee; 107 lb (49 kg)

The FCW Divas Championship was a women's professional wrestling championship owned and promoted by Florida Championship Wrestling (FCW), a former developmental territory of WWE. It was contested for in their women's division. A tournament was held to determine the inaugural champion.

The first champion was Naomi Knight who won an eight-woman tournament on June 10, 2010, by defeating Serena in the tournament finals. There were six reigns shared between six wrestlers, and one vacancy. In August 2012, the championship was retired when FCW closed down in favor of NXT, WWE's new development system. The final champion was Caylee Turner, however due to her August 2012 release, the championship was already vacated when it was deactivated as a result of the re-branding. The title was replaced the following year with the NXT Women's Championship.

== Inaugural championship tournament (2010) ==
A tournament was held at the FCW television tapings from April to June 2010 to determine the inaugural champion.

Quarterfinals
Serena	Pin
Aksana
AJ Lee	Pin
Tamina
Savannah	Pin
Jamie Keyes
Naomi Night	Pin
Liviana

Semifinals
Serena	Pin
AJ Lee
Savannah
Naomi Night	Pin

Final
Serena
Naomi Knight	Pin

== Reigns ==
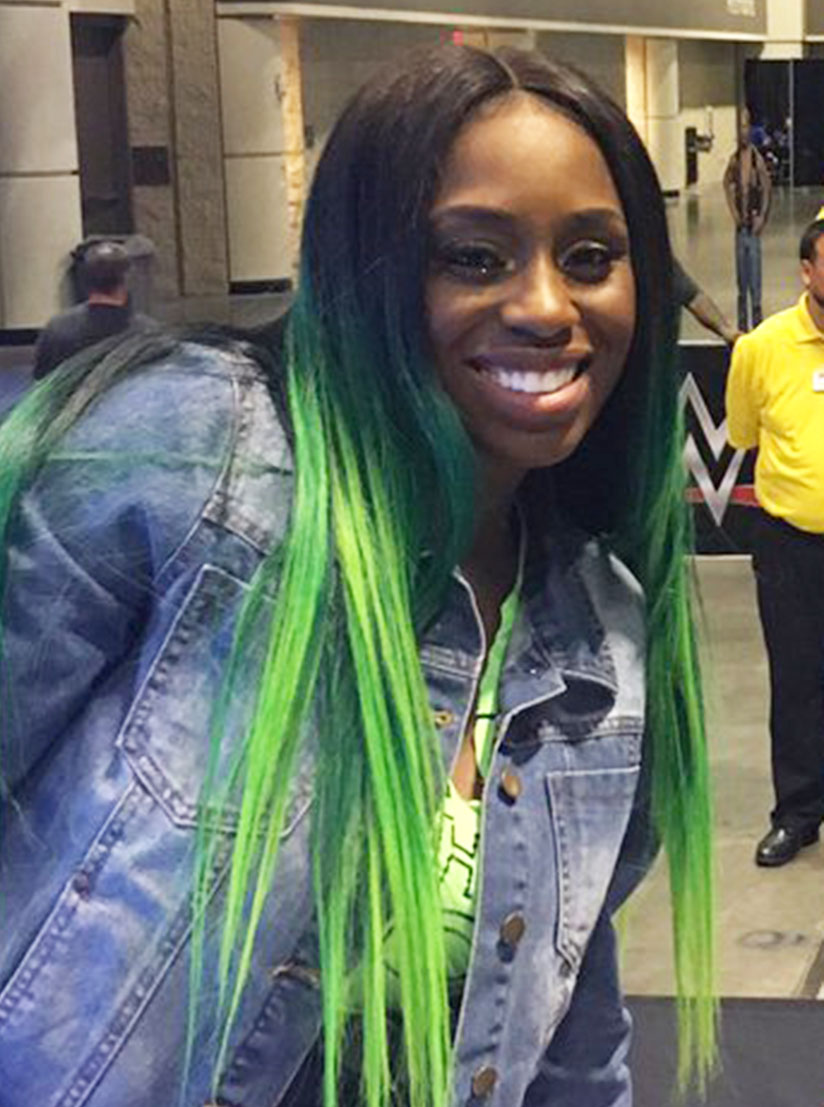
The inaugural champion Naomi Knight

Over the championship's two-year history, there have been six reigns between six champions. Naomi Night was the inaugural champion. Raquel Diaz's reigns is the longest at 197 days, while Caylee Turner's reign is the shortest at 43 days. Aksana is the oldest champion at 29 years old, while Diaz is the youngest at 21 years old.

Turner was the final champion in her first reign. She won the title by defeating Diaz on June 29, 2012, during a Live event, held and it for 43 days until her release on August 11. On the same day, the championship was retired due to FCW closing down.

Key
No.	Overall reign number
Reign	Reign number for the specific champion
Days	Number of days held

No.	Champion	Championship change			Reign statistics		Notes	Ref.
No.	Champion	Date	Event	Location	Reign	Days	Notes	Ref.
1	Naomi Knight	June 10, 2010	FCW	Tampa, FL	1	189	Defeated Serena in the finals of an eight-woman single elimination tournament to become the inaugural champion. Aired on tape delay on June 20, 2010.	
2	AJ Lee	December 16, 2010	FCW	Tampa, FL	1	112	Aired on tape delay on January 23, 2011.	
3	Aksana	April 7, 2011	FCW	Tampa, FL	1	147	This was a title vs. title match, with Aksana's Queen of FCW title also on the line. Aired on tape delay on May 15, 2011.	
4	Audrey Marie	September 1, 2011	FCW	Tampa, FL	1	105	Aired on tape delay on September 25, 2011.	
5	Raquel Diaz	December 15, 2011	FCW	Tampa, FL	1	197	Making Raquel both Queen of FCW and FCW Divas Champion. Aired on tape delay on January 22, 2012.	
6	Caylee Turner	June 29, 2012	Live event	Melbourne, FL	1	43		
—	Vacated	August 11, 2012	—	Tampa, FL	—	—	Title vacated when Caylee Turner was released by WWE.	
—	Deactivated	August 11, 2012	—	Tampa, FL	—	—	Title retired when FCW closed down.	

== See also ==
- Queen of FCW
