= Christina Crawford (wrestler) =

American dancer and professional wrestler

Personal information
- Born: Christina Crawford; October 17, 1988 (age 37) Ponte Vedra Beach, Florida, U.S.
- Education: University of Central Florida
- Family: Alicia Fox (sister)

Professional wrestling career
- Ring name(s): Caylee Fox; Caylee Turner; Christina Crawford
- Billed height: 5 ft 8 in (1.73 m)
- Billed from: Ponte Vedra Beach, Florida
- Trained by: Bill DeMott; Booker T Florida Championship Wrestling; Steve Keirn; Trish Stratus
- Debut: July 8, 2010
- Retired: 2012

Christina Crawford (born October 17, 1988) is an American cheerleader, dancer, and retired ring announcer and professional wrestler. She is best known for time in WWE, under the ring name Caylee Turner. She is the younger sister of professional wrestler Alicia Fox.

Crawford first gained fame as a contestant on Tough Enough, a televised competition that would award the winner a WWE contract, but was eliminated from the competition. As part of WWE's developmental territory Florida Championship Wrestling, she was a one-time FCW Divas Champion. After leaving wrestling in 2012, she became a cheerleader for the Tampa Bay Buccaneers of the National Football League.

== Professional wrestling career ==
In June 2010, Crawford signed a developmental contract with WWE and was later assigned to Florida Championship Wrestling (FCW). She debuted on July 8, 2010, in a bikini contest. It was not until November 20 that she made her in-ring debut, under the new ring name Caylee Turner, in a six-diva tag team match with Rosa Mendes and Aksana but lost the match to AJ Lee, Kaitlyn, and Naomi Knight. In February 2011, Crawford was released from her WWE contract in order to participate in the filming of the rebooted Tough Enough series.

In March 2011, Crawford was announced as one of the fourteen contestants for the revival of Tough Enough. She was cut from the competition on the May 23 episode, along with A.J. Kirsch.

After being cut on Tough Enough, Crawford re-signed with WWE, and returned on June 22 in a tag team match. She spent the next few months mainly competing in tag team matches. Beginning in January 2012, Turner began challenging for the FCW Divas Championship, failing to win it from Audrey Marie. She began feuding with the Anti-Diva Army (Sofia Cortez, Paige, and Raquel Diaz) in March, forming an alliance with Audrey Marie and Kaitlyn to do so. Turner made her debut for NXT Wrestling on the June 20 episode of NXT, as a special guest ring announcer. On June 29, Turner defeated Diaz to win the FCW Divas Championship for the first time.

On the August 1, 2012, episode of NXT, Turner appeared in an in-ring segment where NXT Commissioner Dusty Rhodes announced a "Gold Rush" tournament, featuring 4 developmental roster NXT Superstars and 4 main roster WWE Superstars competing to be crowned as the inaugural NXT Champion. On the August 5 episode of FCW TV, Turner successfully defended her Divas Championship against Sofia Cortez. This would turn out to be her last match in FCW, as she was released from her WWE contract on August 11, 2012. She was still champion upon her release, therefore the title was vacated. Turner made her in-ring debut as a heel on the August 8 episode of NXT, teaming with the villainous Kaitlyn in a losing effort to Tamina Snuka and Paige, which also served as her final televised match for the company before her release. The FCW Divas title was retired three days later on August 14 as a result of the rebranding of FCW to NXT Wrestling, making Turner the final champion. On August 11, 2012, Crawford was released from her WWE contract.

On November 1, 2012, Crawford competed in a TNA tryout match in a losing effort against ODB. She appeared for World Xtreme Wrestling in a wrestling role competing in a winning effort against Angel Love. Crawford made her debut for North East Wrestling (NEW) on December 8 at a North East Wrestling event, where she competed against Ivelisse Velez, in a losing effort. After the match, Crawford turned heel after attacking her and demanding a contract to the promotion. Two days later, Crawford wrestled Velez again at another North East Wrestling event on December 10, this time in a Winner Gets Contract, Loser Banned Forever match, but lost yet again to Velez, thus banning her from the promotion until further notice.

== Cheerleading career ==
Crawford began working as a cheerleader for the Tampa Bay Buccaneers of the National Football League in 2013.

== Personal life ==
Crawford graduated from the University of Central Florida in 2012, where she studied interpersonal communications. She has an older sister named Victoria, who was a professional wrestler for WWE, under the ring name Alicia Fox.

In November 2020, Crawford revealed on Instagram that she had become a certified real estate broker.

Crawford is married and has a son.

== Championships and accomplishments ==
- Florida Championship Wrestling
  - FCW Divas Championship (1 time, final)
