= Queen of FCW =

Professional wrestling women's championship

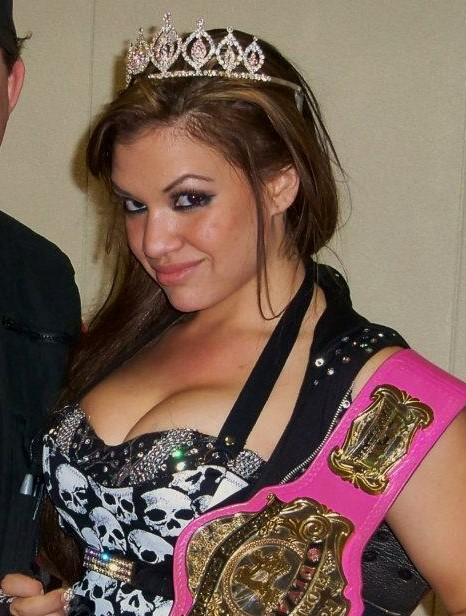
- Final Queen of FCW Raquel Diaz, pictured with the crown that represents the Queen of FCW title on the top of her head.

Details
- Promotion: Florida Championship Wrestling
- Date established: February 5, 2009
- Date retired: March 15, 2012

Other name(s)
- Queen of Florida
Statistics
- First champion(s): Angela Fong
- Final champion(s): Raquel Diaz
- Most reigns: all titleholders (1 reign)
- Longest reign: AJ Lee and Aksana (287 days each)
- Shortest reign: Rosa Mendes (77 days)
- Oldest champion: Rosa Mendes (31 years, 31 days)
- Youngest champion: Raquel Diaz (21 years, 34 days)
- Heaviest champion: Serena Mancini
- Lightest champion: AJ Lee

The Queen of FCW title was a women's professional wrestling title in Florida Championship Wrestling (FCW, since re-branded to NXT); it was contested in their Divas division. Title holders would wear a crown rather than a championship belt that is primarily used in professional wrestling. The title was active for over three years, before being deactivated in March 2012, leaving the FCW Divas Championship as the sole title contested for in the Divas division. Raquel Diaz was the final title holder.

== Inaugural championship tournament ==
FCW Divas tournament to determine the inaugural Queen of FCW, won by Angela.

Quarterfinals
Angela	Pin
Rosa Mendes
Saylor James
The Girl from Mexico	Pin
Jenny Cash
Alicia Fox	Pin
Wesley Holiday
Tiffany	Pin

Semifinals
Angela	Pin
The Girl from Mexico
Alicia Fox	Pin
Tiffany

Final
Angela	Pin
Alicia Fox

== Reigns ==
Over the championship's three-year history, there have been six reigns between six champions. Angela Fong was the inaugural champion. AJ Lee and Aksana holds the record for the longest reign at 287 days, while Rosa Mendes' reign was the shortest at 77 days. Mendes is the oldest champion at 31 years old, while Raquel Diaz is the youngest at 21 years old.

Diaz was the last champion in her first reign, holding the title for 119 until it being deactivated by FCW General Manager Summer Rae.

Key
No.	Overall reign number
Reign	Reign number for the specific champion
Days	Number of days held

No.	Champion	Championship change			Reign statistics		Notes	Ref.
No.	Champion	Date	Event	Location	Reign	Days	Notes	Ref.
1	Angela Fong	February 5, 2009	FCW	Tampa, FL	1	210	Defeated Alicia Fox in the finals of an eight-woman single elimination tournament to be crowned the inaugural champion.	
2	Mia Mancini	September 3, 2009	FCW	Tampa, FL	1	154	Aired on tape delay on September 27, 2009. She also went by the ring names Serena Mancini and simply Serena during this reign.	
3	AJ Lee	February 4, 2010	FCW	Tampa, FL	1	287	Aired on tape delay on February 14, 2010.	
4	Rosa Mendes	November 18, 2010	FCW	Tampa, FL	1	77	Aired on tape delay on December 12, 2010.	
5	Aksana	February 3, 2011	March of Champions	Tampa, FL	1	287	Aired on tape delay on March 13, 2011.	
6	Raquel Diaz	November 17, 2011	FCW	Tampa, FL	1	119	Aired on tape delay on December 18, 2011.	
—	Deactivated	March 15, 2012	FCW	Tampa, FL	—	—	FCW General Manager Summer Rae deactivated the Queen of FCW title preferring to go with and continue the FCW Divas Championship title history. Aired on tape delay on April 1, 2012.	

== See also ==
- FCW Divas Championship
