= Catrina (wrestler) =

American professional wrestler (born 1986)

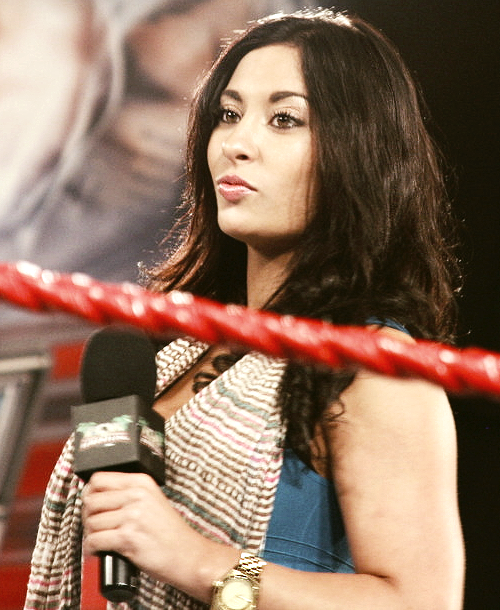
- Perez at an FCW live event in 2009

Personal information
- Born: Karlee Leilani Perez; April 19, 1986 (age 40) Tampa, Florida, U.S.

Professional wrestling career
- Ring name(s): The Candy Girl; Catrina; Karlee Perez; Liviana; Maxine
- Billed height: 5 ft 4 in (163 cm)
- Billed weight: 120 lb (54 kg)
- Billed from: Grand Rapids, Michigan; Tampa, Florida
- Trained by: Florida Championship Wrestling
- Debut: 2009

Karlee Leilani Perez (born April 19, 1986) is an American actress, model, and retired professional wrestler. She is best known for her time in WWE under the ring name Maxine. She is also known for her appearances with Lucha Underground under the ring name Catrina between 2015 and 2016.

== Early life ==
Perez was born in Tampa, Florida, and is of Spanish, Cuban, Italian, Hawaiian, and Chinese ancestry. She majored in criminology at college.

== Professional wrestling career ==
=== World Wrestling Entertainment/WWE (2009-2012) ===
==== Florida Championship Wrestling (2009–2012) ====
In 2009, Perez signed a contract with the professional wrestling promotion World Wrestling Entertainment (WWE). She was assigned to their then developmental territory, Florida Championship Wrestling (FCW), debuting that July under the ring name "The Candy Girl", in a Divas handicap tag team match, teaming with Alicia Fox and Rosa Mendes to defeat Tiffany and Angela. Her name was changed to "Liviana" in October, and she became the manager of Sweet Papi Sanchez. She competed in an 8-Diva tournament to determine the inaugural FCW Divas Champion, but was eliminated by Naomi Night in the first round.

After returning to wrestle in September 2010 on the third season of NXT under the name "Maxine", she became the acting General Manager of FCW, and formed a villainous group with Aksana, Lucky Cannon and Damien Sandow. On an episode of FCW TV, Maxine defeated Aksana after an inference from Aksana's "husband", Goldust. On an episode of FCW TV, after Naomi lost to Aksana in an FCW Divas Championship match, Maxine attacked Naomi, but was stopped when AJ Lee came to Naomi's aid. On the February 17 episode of FCW TV, Maxine defeated Kaitlyn. On the April 7 episode of FCW TV, Maxine interfered in an FCW Divas Championship match between AJ Lee and Aksana, helping Aksana defeat AJ to win the championship. On the March 11, 2012 episode of FCW TV, Maxine was fired from the position of the acting General Manager, and was later replaced with Summer Rae.

==== NXT and main roster (2010–2012) ====
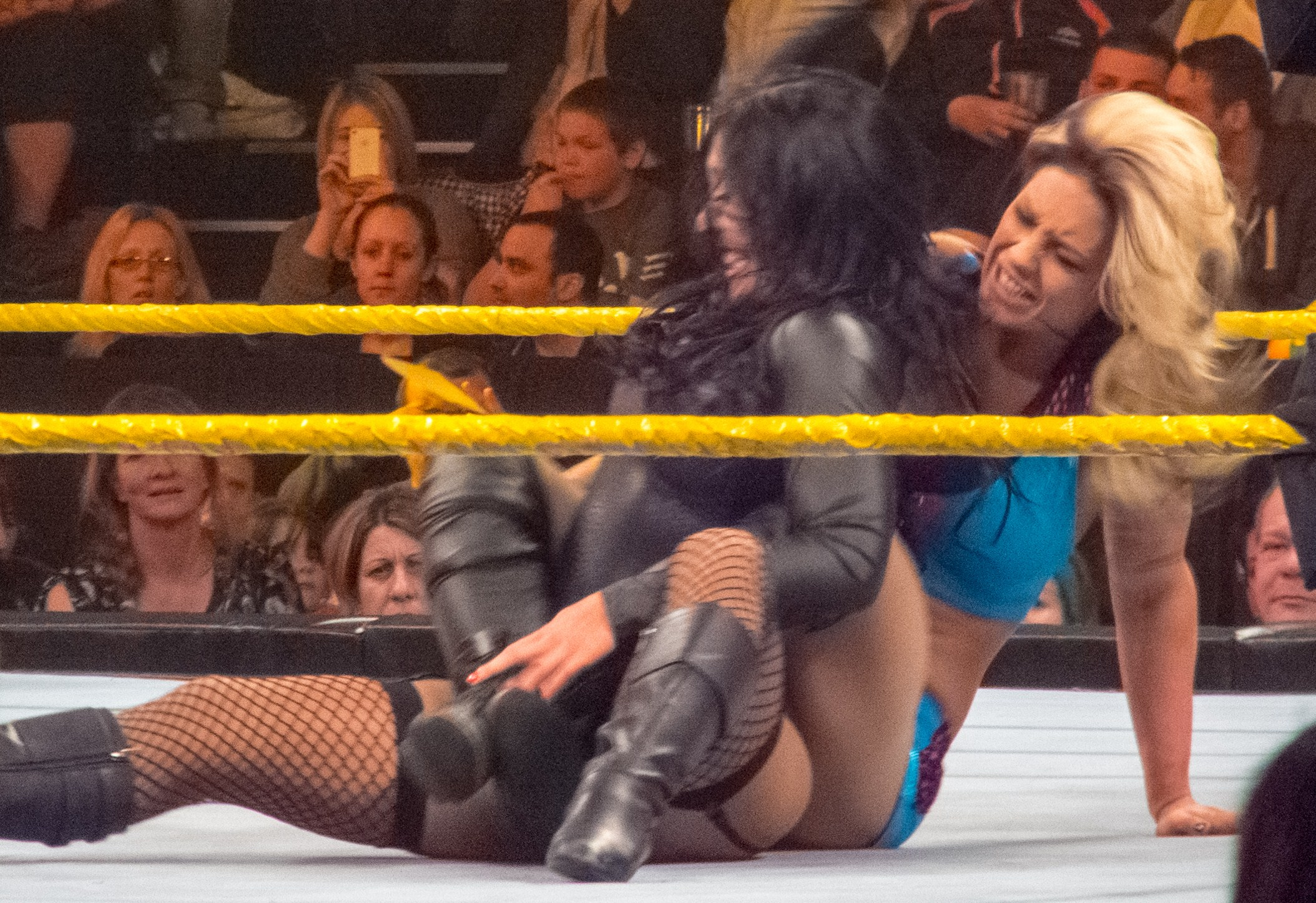
Kaitlyn bodyscissors on Maxine

On the August 31, 2010 episode of NXT, it was announced that she would be part of the all-female third season of NXT as Maxine, with Alicia Fox as her mentor. On the September 7 episode of NXT, she competed in a "Dance Competition" and a "Capture the Flag" contest unsuccessfully, and also teamed with Fox in a loss to fellow rookie Diva Naomi and her mentor Kelly Kelly. On the September 21 episode of NXT, Maxine lost to AJ, and later that night failed to win the "Talk the Talk" challenge. On the October 5 episode of NXT, Maxine lost to Aksana, and unsuccessfully competed in a "Mechanical Bull Riding" contest and a "Talent Show" contest after Hornswoggle shoved a pie in her face. On October 12 episode of NXT, she unsuccessfully competed in a "Name that Tune" contest and a "Power of the Punch" contest. The next week on NXT, Maxine won her first singles match by defeating Kaitlyn, but unsuccessfully competed in the "Who's That Body" contest and the limbo contest, although host Matt Striker incorrectly declared Naomi the winner without her successfully completing the round Maxine failed. On the October 26 episode of NXT, Maxine lost a match to Naomi, but won a "Halloween Candy" contest. On the November 2 episode of NXT, Maxine lost a "Kissing" contest, and was later that night eliminated from competition. After her elimination, Maxine later made an appearance on the season finale on November 30, 2010, where she teamed with Alicia Fox and Aksana in a loss to AJ and The Bella Twins.

After a period of absence from WWE programming, Maxine began appearing on the fifth season of NXT, named NXT Redemption, returning on the August 16, 2011 episode and attacking AJ. She established herself as the on-screen girlfriend of Derrick Bateman, and the pair feuded with AJ and Titus O'Neil, which resulted in Maxine and Bateman losing to AJ and O'Neil in a mixed tag team match on the September 6 episode of NXT Redemption. While trying to sow discord between AJ and her on-screen boyfriend Hornswoggle, Maxine would trade victories with AJ in a series of matches from August to October. On the October 26 episode of NXT Redemption, Bateman proposed to Maxine in the storyline, which she would accept. On the November 2 episode of NXT Redemption, Bateman and Maxine became known as "Beta-Max", and they competed in a six-person mixed tag team match along with JTG in a loss to AJ, O'Neil and Percy Watson.

On the November 30 episode of NXT Redemption, Maxine lost a match against her former mentor Alicia Fox, when she was accidentally distracted by Derrick Bateman and his mother, and ended up leaving the arena with Johnny Curtis, resulting in Maxine breaking up with Bateman on the December 7 episode of NXT Redemption. On the January 4, 2012 episode of NXT Redemption, Maxine and Curtis interrupted Bateman's match with Darren Young, causing him to lose by announcing that she and Curtis were getting married in Las Vegas. On the 100th episode of NXT Redemption, Maxine and Curtis' wedding ceremony was interrupted by Bateman, who presented security camera footage in his locker room of Curtis stealing Bateman's iPad and sending an e-mail to Theodore Long about getting rid of Maxine and going to Smackdown, and was later reunited with Bateman after she slapped Curtis. The following week on NXT Redemption, Curtis offered a truce with Maxine and Bateman, but Maxine gave Curtis a low blow.

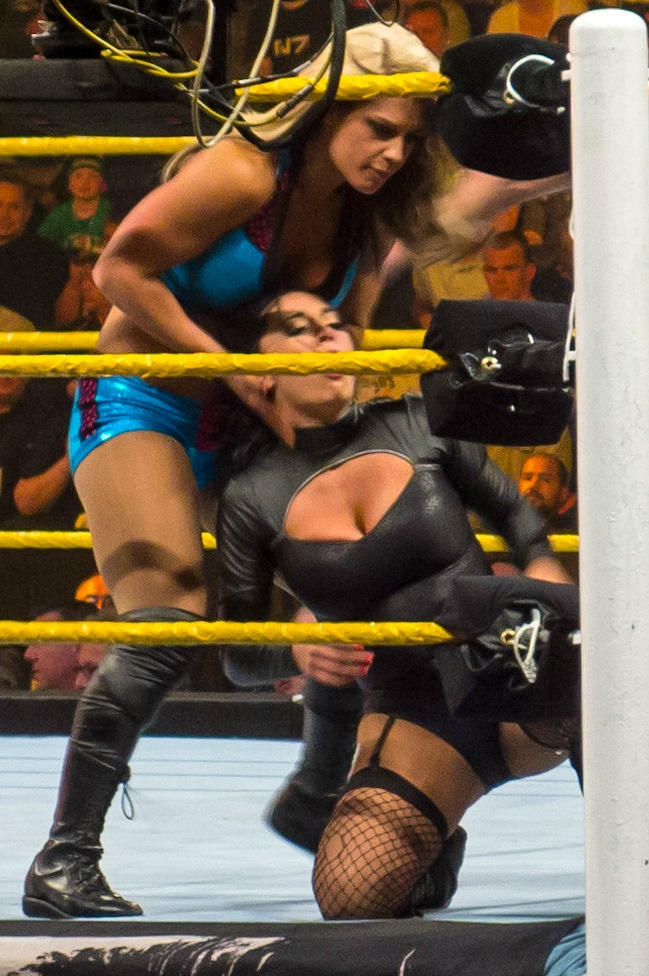
Maxine (kneeling) wrestling Kaitlyn in April 2012

Maxine then began a feud with Kaitlyn on the February 1 episode of NXT Redemption, with Maxine accusing Kaitlyn of liking Bateman. She then attacked Kaitlyn on the February 15 episode of NXT Redemption, thinking that Bateman bought Kaitlyn a gift for Valentine's Day. On the February 29 episode of NXT Redemption, Maxine again attacked Kaitlyn after she confessed her love for Bateman by kissing him, and went on to face Kaitlyn in the main event unsuccessfully. On the March 7 episode of NXT Redemption, in a segment with Johnny Curtis and Derrick Bateman, Maxine revealed to Bateman that they were no longer dating after Kaitlyn kissed Bateman, leading to a mixed tag team match in which Maxine and Curtis lost to Kaitlyn and Bateman on the March 14 episode of NXT Redemption, and Bateman would afterwards confess his love for Kaitlyn, thus solidifying their relationship.

After William Regal was appointed as NXT's match co-ordinator, Maxine would attempt to get close to him in the hopes that he would help her get her out of NXT. On the March 21 episode of NXT Redemption, Maxine and Johnny Curtis knocked out Matt Striker with chloroform in the storyline, so that Maxine could join Regal on commentary, however, Striker was then kidnapped by two masked figures, later revealed to be Curt Hawkins and Tyler Reks, who intended to blackmail Maxine and Curtis into using her charms to get Regal to leave them alone. Striker was then rescued by Bateman and Kaitlyn on the April 11 episode of NXT Redemption. For being involved with Striker's storyline kidnapping, on the March 18 episode of NXT Redemption, after Maxine defeated Kaitlyn in a match, she and Curtis were forced by Regal to sign a contract to permanently be each other's manager or be fired, and were afterwards handcuffed together. Maxine made her first appearance on WWE's main roster on the May 7 episode of Raw, teaming with Natalya in a losing effort against Layla and Kelly Kelly. Maxine then transitioned into a fan favorite, and defeated Tamina Snuka on the May 9 episode of NXT Redemption, and was later released from being handcuffed to Johnny Curtis by Curt Hawkins and Tyler Reks. Her last appearance was on the June 25 episode of Raw as part of the Divas Summertime Beach Battle Royal match won by AJ.

On June 28, 2012, it was reported that Perez had quit WWE. The next day, Perez confirmed that she had asked for and was granted her release from the company to pursue other options, but commented that she was not going to join another wrestling company. Perez later commented that "after sitting for a while, and the chance not really coming, [she] just decided to take it in [her] own hands and make a chance for [herself] which is what [she] did".

=== Total Nonstop Action Wrestling (2014) ===
On May 10, 2014, Perez returned to professional wrestling at the Total Nonstop Action Wrestling (TNA) pay-per-view event One Night Only: Knockouts Knockdown 2. Competing under her real name, Perez lost to Taryn Terrell.

=== Lucha Underground (2014–2018) ===
In September 2014, Perez announced that she had been cast in El Rey network's Lucha Underground. She made her first appearance with the promotion on the second episode of Lucha Underground on November 6, 2014, where she was introduced as "Catrina", the on-screen girlfriend and valet of Mil Muertes. After the storyline with Mil Muertes came to an end, Catrina began managing Fénix on January 17, 2015. However, after Fénix defeated Mil Muertes, Catrina resurrected him, in the storyline. Catrina subsequently returned to managing Muertes and The Disciples of Death (Barrio Negro, Trece and El Sinestro de la Muerte), and helped them win the Lucha Underground Trios Championship from Ivelisse, Angélico and Son of Havoc at Ultima Lucha 1 on July 29.

In November 2015, Lucha Underground announced Catrina as the new proprietor of the company. During the season two premiere on January 27, 2016, Catrina managed Muertes during his Lucha Underground Championship match against Ivelisse. At Ultima Lucha Dos Part 3, Catrina cost Ivelisse her match against Taya and then delivering the Lick of Death to Ivelisse. On the first episode of Lucha Underground Season 3, Ivelisse challenged Catrina to her first ever match in Lucha Underground at Ultima Lucha Tres. It's revealed later on that Captain Vasquez is her mother. At Ultima Lucha Tres Catrina was defeated by Ivelisse.

=== Independent circuit (2015) ===
Under her real name, Perez defeated Joey Ryan at a Beyond Wrestling event in Providence, Rhode Island on August 30, 2015.

=== Major League Wrestling (2021) ===
Catrina made her Major League Wrestling debut at Fightland, resuming her function as Mil Muertes' valet.

== Acting career ==
During her WWE career, Perez took acting lessons for three and a half years. In June 2013, Perez joined the talent agency MPC Models and began auditioning for acting roles. Perez received her first role in August 2013, when she was cast in the web series The Cell.

== Filmography ==
=== Film ===
Year	Title	Role	Notes
2014	Interview with the Prince	Racquel Phillips	
2015	Funny	Sophiena	
2018	Mapplethorpe	Lisa Lyon	
2019	Nation's Fire	Jazz	
2019	Xenophobia	Adrian	
2019	Rogue Cell	Dana Garcia	
2020	Seized	Alanza	

=== Television ===
Year	Title	Role	Notes
2014	The Cell	Dana Garcia	Episode: "Spanish Lullaby"
2014	Changelings	Camilla Reiquist	Episode: "Descension"

== Championships and accomplishments ==
- Wrestling Observer Newsletter
  - Worst Worked Match of the Year (2010) vs. Kaitlyn on NXT on October 19
