= Audrey Marie =

American professional wrestler

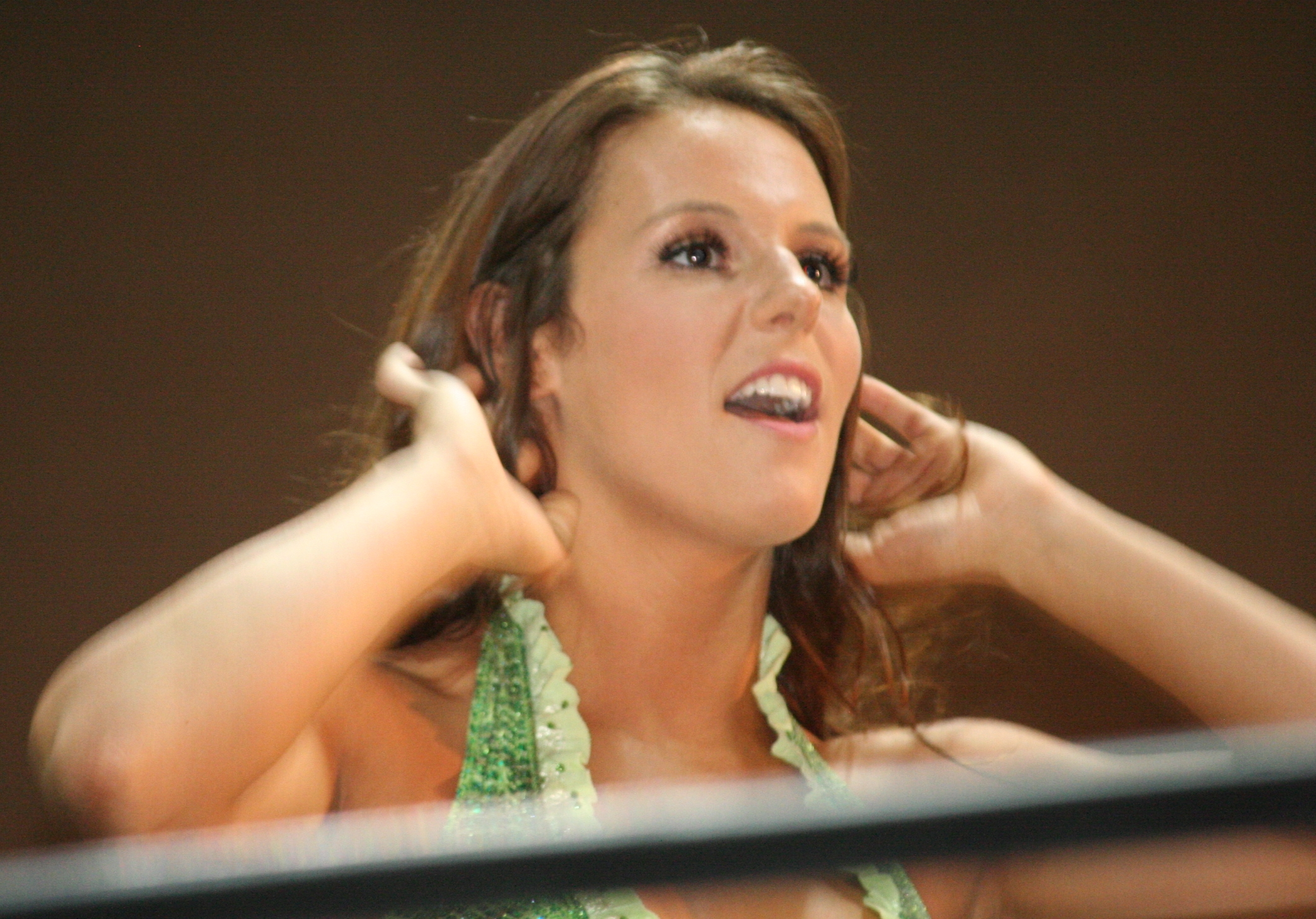
- Audrey Marie in 2013

Personal information
- Born: Ashley Nicole Miller; September 17, 1988 (age 37) Houston, Texas, U.S.
- Spouse: Tyler Breeze (m. 2016; div. 2019)

Professional wrestling career
- Ring name: Audrey Marie
- Billed height: 5 ft 5 in (1.65 m)
- Billed weight: 120 lb (54 kg)
- Billed from: El Durado, Arizona; Dallas, Texas
- Trained by: Bill DeMott; Norman Smiley; Ricky Steamboat; Terry Taylor; Tom Prichard
- Debut: June 9, 2011
- Retired: June 13, 2014

Ashley Nicole Miller (born September 17, 1988) is an American retired professional wrestler and model. She is best known for her time with WWE in their developmental territory NXT under the ring name Audrey Marie.

== Professional wrestling career ==
=== WWE (2011–2013) ===
==== Florida Championship Wrestling (2011–2012) ====
After signing a contract with WWE in 2011, Miller was assigned to Florida Championship Wrestling (FCW), WWE's developmental territory. She made her in-ring debut on June 9, 2011, episode of FCW television under the name "Audrey Marie", in a tag team match with Sonia in a losing effort to AJ Lee and Aksana. On June 28, she won her first match teaming up with Aksana and Maxine against Leah West, Naomi, and Caylee Turner. On the September 1 episode of FCW television, Marie defeated Aksana to win the FCW Divas Championship, her first title in FCW. After successful title defenses against Naomi, she lost the championship to Raquel Diaz in December. She failed to regain the championship in a three-way in February 2012, and again in a singles match in March. She then moved into a feud with Paige, facing her on several occasions. On the final episode of FCW television on July 15, Paige and Marie ended their feud with Marie victorious in a no disqualification match.

==== NXT (2012–2013) ====
After WWE rebranded FCW as NXT, Marie's NXT television debut took place on the August 1 episode of WWE NXT taped at Full Sail University, where she lost to Raquel Diaz. After spending several months losing in tag team matches, she won her first televised match for NXT on the November 28 episode, defeating Emma, while also turning villainous. In late January 2013, Sasha Banks began receiving letters from a "secret admirer". On the February 20 episode of NXT, the admirer was revealed to be a scheming Marie, who promptly ambushed Banks; the villainous Marie had been jealous of Banks' success in NXT while she herself had been out injured. Marie went on to defeat Banks in her return match later that episode. Marie's feud with Banks ended on the April 3 episode of NXT, when Marie teamed with Summer Rae against Banks and Paige. Marie was pinned after Rae ran away from the match. On May 17, 2013, Marie was released; her last televised match was a loss to Emma on the May 29 episode of NXT which was taped before her release.

=== Independent circuit (2014) ===
On June 13, 2014, Marie made her first independent appearance in women's promotion Queens of Combat as a face, losing to Heather Patera in her debut match for the promotion.

== Personal life ==
Miller married Matthew Clement, better known as Tyler Breeze in September 2016. They divorced in 2019.

== Championships and accomplishments ==
- Florida Championship Wrestling
  - FCW Divas Championship (1 time)
