= Aksana (wrestler) =

Lithuanian professional wrestler, fitness model and bodybuilder

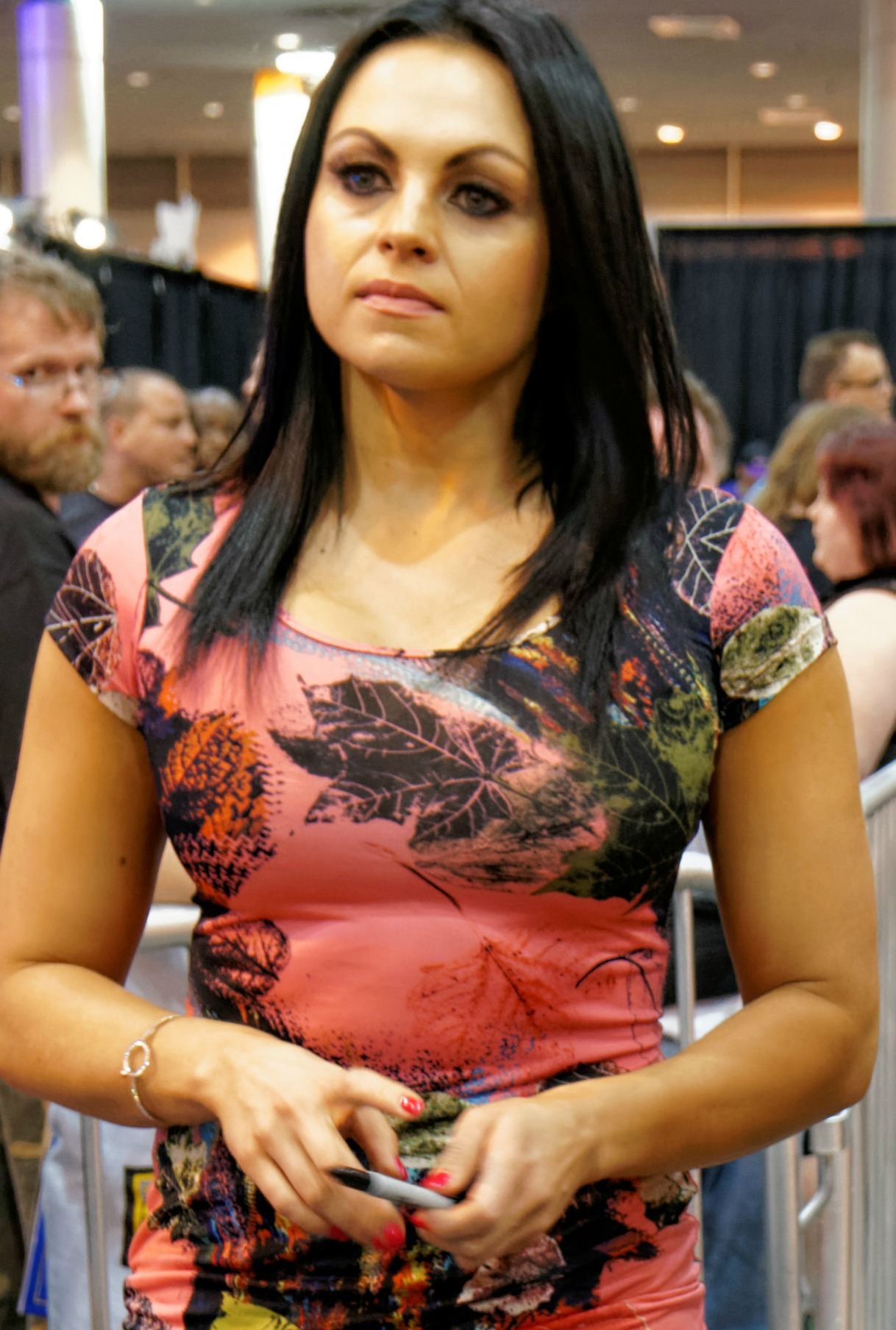
- Aksana in 2014

Personal information
- Born: April 29, 1982 (age 44) Alytus, Lithuanian SSR, Soviet Union (now Lithuania)
- Children: 1

Professional wrestling career
- Ring name: Aksana
- Billed height: 5 ft 6 in (1.68 m)
- Billed weight: 130 lb (59 kg)
- Billed from: Alytus, Lithuania
- Trained by: Florida Championship Wrestling
- Debut: September 2009
- Retired: June 12, 2014

Živilė Raudonienė (born April 29, 1982) is a Lithuanian fitness model, bodybuilder, and retired professional wrestler. She is best known for her time in WWE, where she performed under the ring name Aksana.

Raudonienė began her career as a bodybuilder at the age of 13, where she began her training. At the age of 17, she was the youngest participant in the 1999 IFBB Arnold Classic Contest. During her time as a bodybuilder, she won three medals in Bodybuilding Amateur World Championships (2 silver, 1 bronze).

Raudonienė signed with the professional wrestling promotion WWE and was assigned to their developmental system, Florida Championship Wrestling (FCW), debuting in October 2009. She became the Queen of FCW and won the FCW Divas Championship, and was the first woman to hold both titles simultaneously. In September 2010, she competed in the third season of NXT, placing fourth. She made her debut on the main roster in August 2011, and remained with the company until her release in June 2014. After leaving WWE, she began to work as a fitness trainer in a gym.

== Bodybuilding ==
Raudonienė worked as a successful bodybuilder, fitness model and personal trainer. Raudonienė began working out in the year 1996, and after a year, she entered her first fitness contest. At the age of 16, she was the youngest participant in the 1999 IFBB European Fitness Championships. She went on to win the 2009 IFBB Arnold Classic Contest, and has competed in numerous other bodybuilding contests.

== Professional wrestling career ==
=== World Wrestling Entertainment/WWE (2009–2014) ===
==== Developmental territories (2009–2011) ====
In an interview that aired in September 2009, Raudonienė revealed that she had been signed by the professional wrestling promotion WWE, and had begun training at their then-developmental territory, Florida Championship Wrestling (FCW). Raudonienė debuted under the ring name "Olga" at a FCW live event in a Divas Halloween Costume contest on October 29, 2009. The following month, her ring name was changed to "Aksana", and she began managing Eli Cottonwood. She was also involved in a storyline where she was kidnapped by Sweet Papi Sanchez, and over the following weeks, videos of Aksana were shown to Cottonwood until she was returned to him.

Aksana made her in-ring debut at an FCW live event on January 15, 2010, when she teamed with AJ Lee, Savannah, and Eve Torres to defeat Serena Mancini, Naomi Knight, Courtney Taylor, and Liviana. She began appearing on "The Abraham Washington Show", Abraham Washington's in-ring talk show segment, where she acted as his sidekick. She continued to wrestle as well, appearing in several multi-Diva tag team matches. When it was announced that there would be a creation of the FCW Divas Championship, Aksana competed in a tournament to determine the inaugural champion, but was defeated in the first round by Serena. In August, she began hosting "The Aksana Show", a spin-off of "The Abraham Washington Show", with guests including Mason Ryan, FCW Florida Tag Team Champions Johnny Curtis and Derrick Bateman, and FCW Divas Champion Naomi Knight. On August 31, 2010, it was announced that Raudonienė would be part of the all-female third season of NXT, retaining the ring name Aksana, and with Goldust as her storyline mentor. On the September 21 episode of NXT, Aksana began a storyline where she was having problems with her visa and was facing deportation from the United States. On the October 5 episode of NXT, Aksana won a challenge for the first time by winning the mechanical bull riding contest. The following week, Goldust proposed to Aksana in the storyline so that she could remain in the United States, which she accepted.

At Bragging Rights, Aksana made her first appearance on WWE's main roster by accompanying Goldust in a loss to Ted DiBiase. On the October 26 episode of NXT, Aksana teamed up with Goldust to defeat Maryse and DiBiase. On the November 2 episode of NXT, Goldust and Aksana's storyline wedding took place. As Goldust was about to kiss his new wife, Aksana slapped him and left. The next night on NXT, Goldust confronted his wife about their wedding. Aksana revealed she only married him to stay in the country, and Goldust responded by putting Aksana in a match with Naomi, which she lost. On November 16, on NXT, Aksana was eliminated from the competition. She returned for the season finale on November 30.

On the February 3, 2011, episode of FCW TV, Aksana defeated Rosa Mendes to become the new Queen of FCW. Aksana later joined the villainous group formed by FCW General Manager Maxine, alongside Lucky Cannon, AJ Lee, and Damien Sandow. On the April 7 episode of FCW TV, Aksana defeated AJ Lee to win the FCW Divas Championship, after interference from Maxine. Her victory made her the first woman to hold the Queen of FCW title and FCW Divas Championship simultaneously. She retained the championship against Naomi Knight, before losing the title to Audrey Marie on the September 1 episode of FCW TV. On the November 17 episode of FCW TV, Aksana lost the Queen of FCW crown to Raquel Diaz.

==== Various storylines (2011–2013) ====
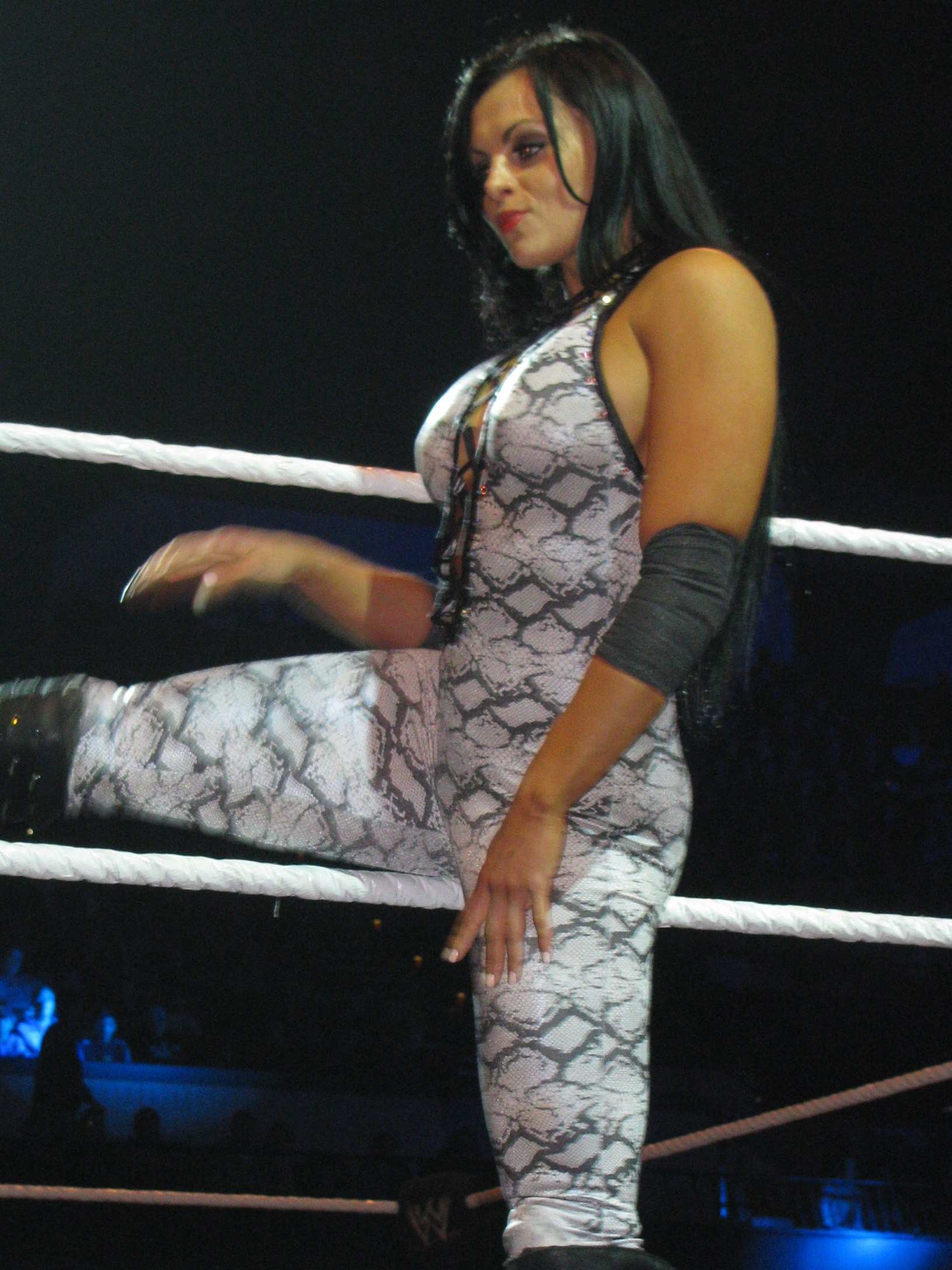
Aksana making her entrance during a WWE live event in July 2013.

On the October 31 episode of Raw, Aksana competed in her first match on the main roster, a Divas Halloween Costume battle royal to determine the number one contender for the WWE Divas Championship, but was eliminated. On the January 27, 2012, episode of SmackDown, Aksana won her first singles match by quickly defeating Natalya. In April, Aksana began a storyline relationship with the debuting Antonio Cesaro, thus turning heel in the process. On the June 29 episode of SmackDown, Aksana and Cesaro lost a mixed tag team match to The Great Khali and Layla. At SummerSlam, she was present when Cesaro won the United States Championship. However, on the September 21 episode of SmackDown, Cesaro ended their relationship after an inadvertent distraction from her cost him his non-title match with Santino Marella.

At the Night of Champions pay-per-view, Kaitlyn was attacked by a mysterious person with blonde hair before her Divas Championship match with Layla, which resulted in Eve Torres replacing Kaitlyn and winning the championship. On the October 26 episode of SmackDown, Aksana was revealed as the attacker, on Torres' orders. Later that night, Aksana and Torres defeated Layla and Kaitlyn in a tag team match. At Survivor Series, Aksana attacked Kaitlyn while disguised, but Kaitlyn fought her off to end the storyline. On the TLC: Tables, Ladders & Chairs pre-show on December 16, Aksana competed in a "Santa's Little Helpers" battle royal to determine the number one contender to the Divas Championship, which was won by Naomi. Aksana's alliance with Eve Torres ended after Torres left WWE in January 2013.

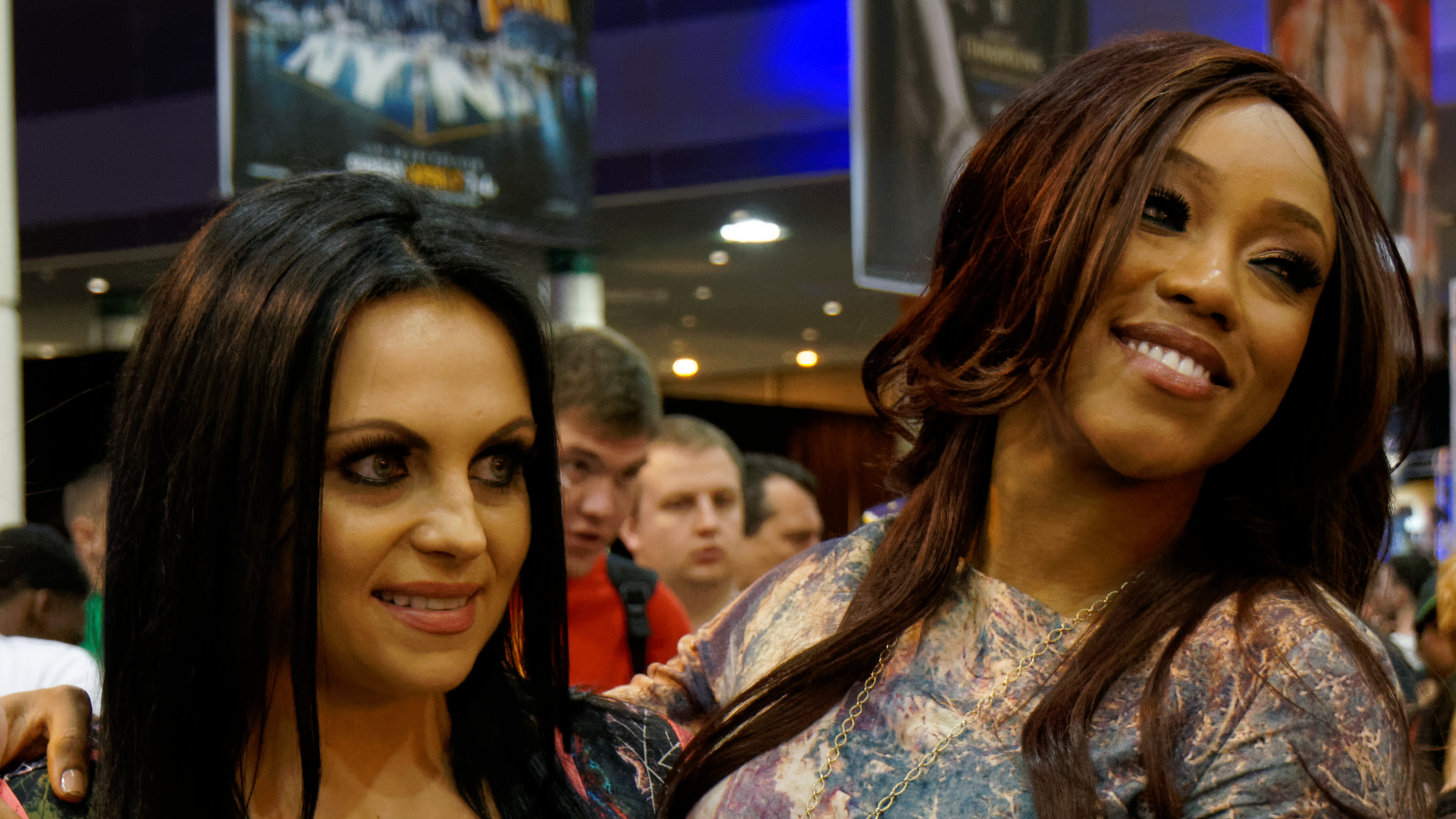
Foxsana (Aksana (left) and Alicia Fox (right)) in April 2014.

On September 6, 2013, Aksana aligned herself with Divas Champion AJ Lee, Alicia Fox, and Layla, and the quartet attacked the cast members of Total Divas. On November 24 at Survivor Series, Aksana participated in a seven-on-seven elimination tag team match against the cast of Total Divas, where she eliminated Brie Bella before being eliminated by Nikki Bella. Aksana went on to pin the Bellas on two separate occasions; Nikki on the December 30 episode of Raw in a ten-Diva tag team match, and Brie in a tag team match on the January 6, 2014, episode of Raw.

==== Foxsana and departure (2014) ====
Aksana then formed a regular tag team with Alicia Fox, and the duo began being referred to as "Foxsana" as of the January 22 episode of Main Event, where they lost to the Bella Twins. Aksana unsuccessfully challenged for the Divas Championship at WrestleMania XXX in the "Vickie Guerrero Divas Championship Invitational" match, which was won by the reigning champion AJ Lee. On the June 2 episode of Raw, Foxsana faced Nikki Bella in a handicap match in a winning effort when Fox pinned Nikki. Following a loss to Paige on June 9 episode of Raw, Fox attacked Aksana, provoking a feud between the two. The feud was cut short, however, as on June 12, 2014, WWE announced that Aksana had been released from her contract along with several other talents. Her last match aired on the June 13 episode of SmackDown, where she lost to Fox.

== Other media ==
=== Video games ===
Video game appearances
Year	Title	Notes	Ref.
2013	WWE 2K14	Video game debut	

== Championships and accomplishments ==
=== Bodybuilding ===
- National Physique Committee
  - World Amateur Bodybuilding Championship (2 silvers, 1 bronze)
  - IFBB Arnold Classic Contest (2009)

=== Professional wrestling ===
- Florida Championship Wrestling
  - FCW Divas Championship (1 time)
  - Queen of FCW (1 time)
- Pro Wrestling Illustrated
  - Ranked No. 41 of the best 50 female singles wrestlers in the PWI Female 50 in 2014
