= Kaitlyn (wrestler) =

American bodybuilder, model, and professional wrestler (born 1986)

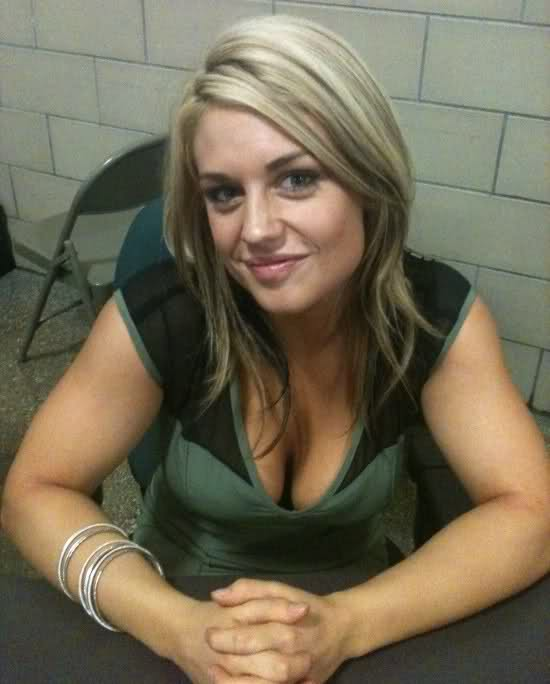
- Kaitlyn in 2012

Personal information
- Born: Celeste Bonin; October 7, 1986 (age 40) Houston, Texas, U.S.
- Spouses: PJ Braun (m. 2014; div. 2017) Grant Dziak (m. 2022; div. 2024)
- Website: shinewithceleste.com

Professional wrestling career
- Ring names: Celeste Bonin; Kaitlyn; Ricki Vaughn
- Billed height: 5 ft 6 in (168 cm)
- Billed weight: 145 lb (66 kg)
- Billed from: Houston, Texas
- Trained by: Pablo Márquez; WWE Performance Center
- Debut: September 7, 2010
- Retired: December 14, 2019

Celeste Bonin (born October 7, 1986) is an American former professional wrestler, entrepreneur, bodybuilder and model. She is best known for her time in WWE from 2010 to 2014, where she performed under the ring name Kaitlyn and became a one-time Divas Champion.

Bonin started her career as a body fitness model. In 2007, she won the National Physique Committee (NPC) John Sherman Classic Bodybuilding Figure and Fitness Championship and came in fifth at the Arnold Classic in the NPC Figure Class D competition.

In July 2010, Bonin signed a developmental contract with WWE. Later that year, she competed in and won the all-female third season of NXT, thus earning a spot on the main roster. She won the WWE Divas Championship in January 2013 and held the title for five months before retiring in January 2014. She came out of retirement and made her in-ring return on the independent circuit in February 2018.

== Early life ==
Celeste Bonin was born in Houston, Texas, on October 7, 1986. Her mother is Mexican.

== Body fitness career ==
Bonin made her body fitness debut in 2006, at the age of 19. In 2007, Bonin won the National Physique Committee (NPC) John Sherman Classic Bodybuilding Figure and Fitness Championship, and came fifth at the Arnold Classic in the NPC Figure Class D competition. She also was in the top five at Musclemania Superbody in 2007, in the Figure Universe – Tall category. In 2008, she was named Miss November at the Hardfitness Calendar, and placed 16th at the NPC Junior Nationals that same year in the NPC Figure category. In 2008, she was part of the Hardfitness Calendar and in 2009, Bonin appeared in Flex Magazine.

== Professional wrestling career ==
=== World Wrestling Entertainment / WWE (2010–2014) ===
==== Florida Championship Wrestling (2010) ====
Bonin, who has named Goldberg as her wrestling idol, signed a developmental contract with World Wrestling Entertainment (WWE) in July 2010 and reported to WWE's developmental territory Florida Championship Wrestling (FCW). She debuted under her real name, competing in a bikini contest at an FCW live event, and later changed her name to Ricki Vaughn. She made her FCW television debut on the August 29 episode, as a lumberjill at ringside for a match between AJ Lee and Naomi Knight. On the November 7 episode of FCW TV, Kaitlyn competed in a tag team match teaming with Knight, defeating Queen of FCW AJ and Aksana.

==== NXT and main roster appearances (2010–2012) ====
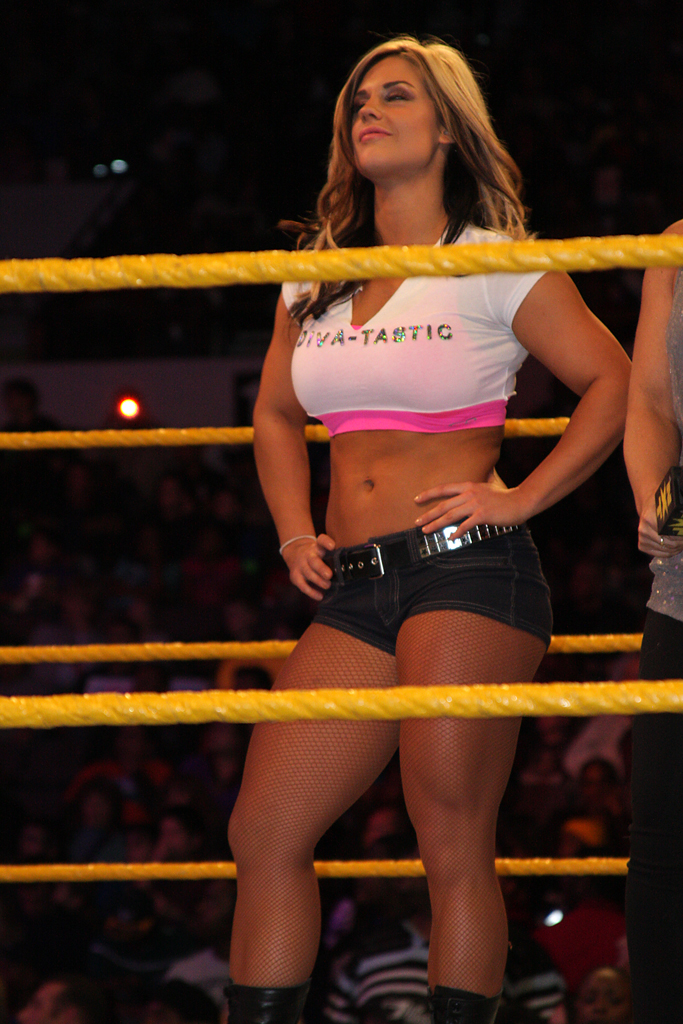
Kaitlyn during an NXT episode in November 2010

On September 7, 2010, Bonin joined season three of NXT under the name Kaitlyn, with Vickie Guerrero as her on-screen mentor. She was the replacement for Guerrero's original rookie, Aloisia, whom Guerrero fired in storyline. On September 14, Kaitlyn made her in-ring debut, teaming alongside Guerrero's on-screen boyfriend, Dolph Ziggler, to defeat AJ and Primo in a mixed tag team match. Kaitlyn made her first pay-per-view appearance at Night of Champions, accompanying Ziggler and Guerrero for Ziggler's WWE Intercontinental Championship match, until Guerrero ordered her to leave ringside. Throughout the next few months, Kaitlyn feuded with Guerrero on both NXT and SmackDown, including several matches between the two. On the November 30 season finale, Kaitlyn was announced as the winner of season three, defeating Naomi in the final to become WWE's "Breakout Diva".

On the December 3, 2010, episode of SmackDown, Kaitlyn appeared in a backstage segment with Guerrero and Ziggler, announcing that SmackDown General Manager Theodore Long had signed her to the brand following her victory on NXT. She had her first match on SmackDown on January 28, 2011, where she and Kelly Kelly were defeated by LayCool (Layla and Michelle McCool).

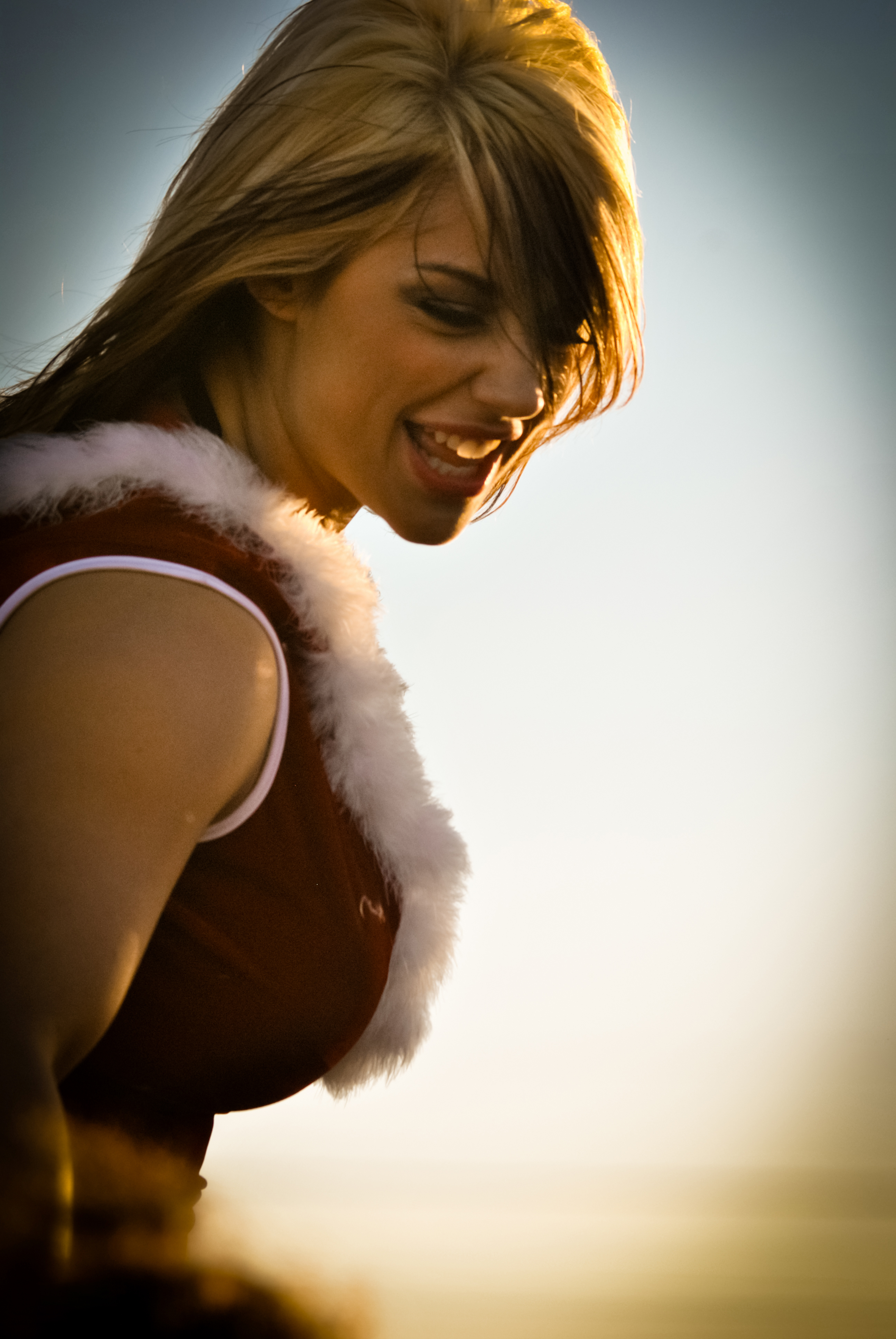
Kaitlyn at the 2010 Tribute to the Troops event

On the May 27 episode of SmackDown, Kaitlyn formed a tag team with AJ Lee, referring to themselves as "The Chickbusters". They were accompanied by their storyline mentor Natalya and lost to Alicia Fox and Tamina in consecutive weeks. On the June 13 episode of Raw, Kaitlyn picked up her first win in a 14-woman tag team match, in which Kelly Kelly pinned Rosa Mendes. The Chickbusters and Natalya continued to feud with Fox and Tamina, who were soon joined by Rosa Mendes, throughout the next two months.

In August, AJ was betrayed by Natalya, who allied with Beth Phoenix to form the Divas of Doom. In the following months, the Chickbusters lost numerous singles and tag team matches to the Divas of Doom. In November, tension began to be teased between the Chickbusters, as Kaitlyn began turning heel due to being upset at their repeated losses. At the SmackDown taping on December 6, after another loss, the evil Kaitlyn turned against AJ and joined the Divas of Doom, cementing herself as a villainess in the process. However, the segment was cut from the broadcast and not acknowledged by WWE.

In February 2012, Kaitlyn began feuding with Maxine on NXT Redemption, who accused Kaitlyn of having a secret crush on her boyfriend Derrick Bateman. After several weeks, Kaitlyn confessed her feelings for Bateman in an "intervention" segment, also involving Alicia Fox and Justin Gabriel, where she kissed Bateman before being interrupted and attacked by Maxine. Later that night, she defeated Maxine in a match. On March 14, after Kaitlyn and Bateman defeated Johnny Curtis and Maxine in a mixed tag team match, Bateman kissed Kaitlyn, solidifying their relationship. Kaitlyn and Bateman were later accused by Maxine and Curtis of being involved with Matt Striker's random disappearance. On April 4, Kaitlyn was defeated by her former mentor Natalya, who was accompanied by Tyson Kidd. Kaitlyn and Bateman later discovered Striker in a janitor's closet hidden by Curt Hawkins and Tyler Reks on April 11. On April 25, while talking to Kidd and Percy Watson backstage, Kaitlyn was approached by Natalya and accused of flirting with Kidd, which led to Kaitlyn and Tamina Snuka defeating Natalya and Maxine in a tag team match.

In April 2012, Kaitlyn returned to SmackDown in attempt to comfort her friend AJ, but was assaulted for her efforts on two separate occasions. This led to a match between the two on May 11, in which Kaitlyn was defeated by AJ.

Kaitlyn went on to compete in her first pay-per-view match at Money in the Bank on July 15, where she teamed with Divas Champion Layla and Tamina Snuka against Beth Phoenix, Natalya, and Eve Torres, with her team coming out victorious.

==== Divas Champion (2012–2013) ====
In August 2012, Kaitlyn was given a job from SmackDown General Manager Booker T as his assistant, but was afterwards put in a match against an angry Eve Torres in which the winner would be awarded the job. Kaitlyn lost the assistant job to Eve the following week. On August 20, Kaitlyn won a battle royal by lastly eliminating Eve to become number one contender to Layla's Divas Championship. Eve then started acting disingenuously towards Kaitlyn and Layla, leaving them confused. At Night of Champions on September 16, Kaitlyn was attacked by a masked villainess, causing her ankle to get injured in the storyline and forcing her title opportunity to get forfeited to Eve. Kaitlyn later stated that the attacker was blonde, leading to Beth Phoenix being suspected. On October 8, Kaitlyn was defeated by Eve in her first Divas Championship match, and was afterwards saved by Layla after Eve attempted to re-injure her. Kaitlyn later confronted Eve about her attacker, later revealed as Aksana, who was instructed by Eve to attack her at Night of Champions, and ended in a brawl also involving Layla. This led to a tag team match on October 26, where Kaitlyn teamed alongside Layla in a loss to Eve and Aksana after Kaitlyn was accidentally kicked by Layla. Kaitlyn received another shot for the Divas Championship at the Hell in a Cell event, but was again defeated by Eve in a triple threat match, also involving Layla.

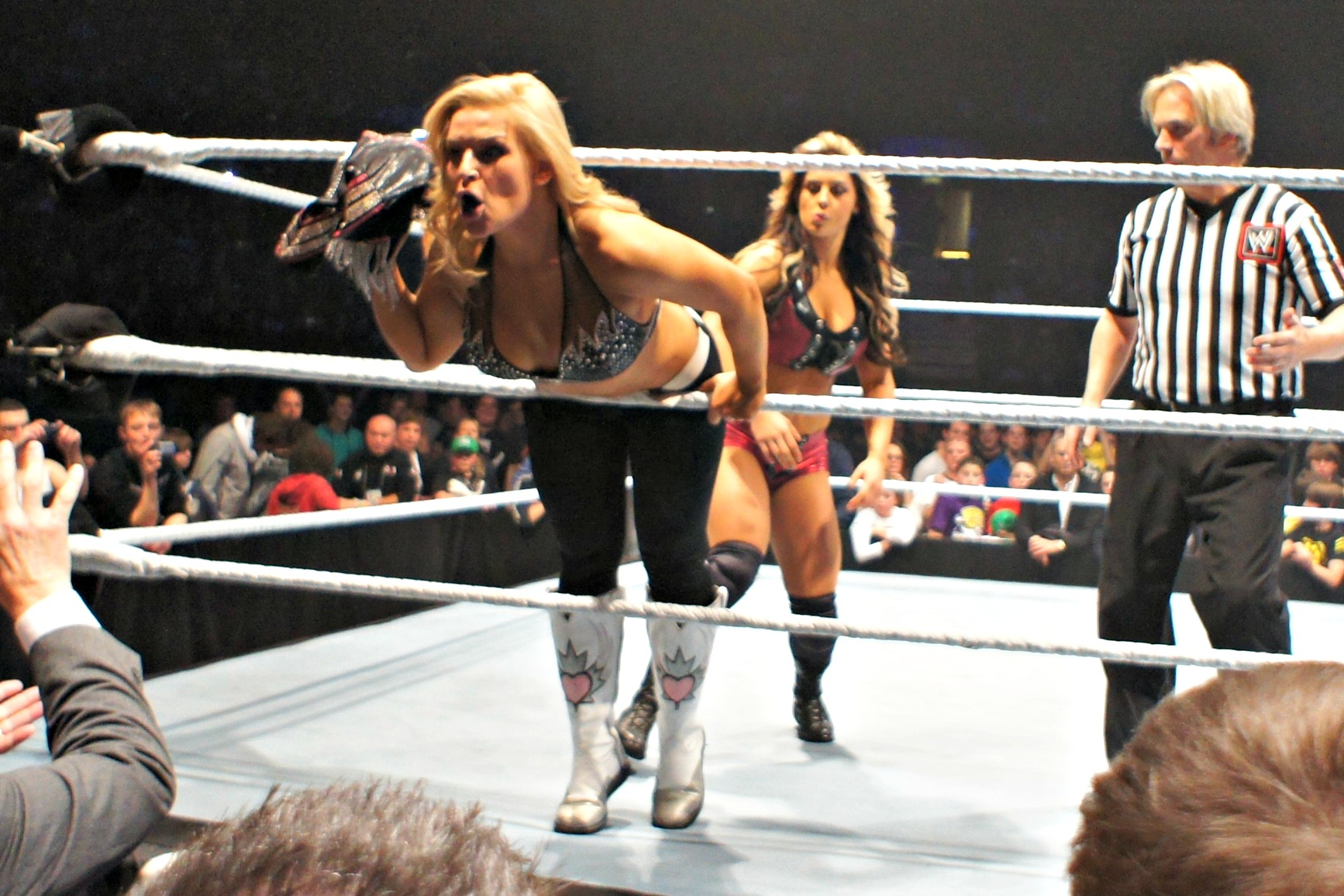
Kaitlyn wrestling Natalya during a WWE house show in November 2012

On the November 6 episode of Raw, Kaitlyn teamed with Layla in a tag team match against Eve and Aksana in a winning effort. The following week on Raw, Kaitlyn defeated Layla to become the number one contender to Eve's Divas Championship. At Survivor Series, Kaitlyn fought off another attack by the evil Aksana and went on to face Eve for the Divas Championship, but was unsuccessful. Kaitlyn got revenge on Aksana the following week on both Raw and SmackDown, defeating her in singles matches.

On December 16 at TLC, Kaitlyn competed in a number one contender's battle royal to face Eve for the championship, but was eliminated due to interference from Eve. After defeating Eve in a non-title match, Eve evaded several title matches against Kaitlyn by fleeing or attacking the referee to get disqualified. This resulted in Kaitlyn getting another title opportunity, with the stipulation that the title would change hands if Eve got disqualified or counted-out; on the 20th anniversary episode of Raw on January 14, Kaitlyn defeated Eve in her hometown of Houston, Texas, to win the Divas Championship.

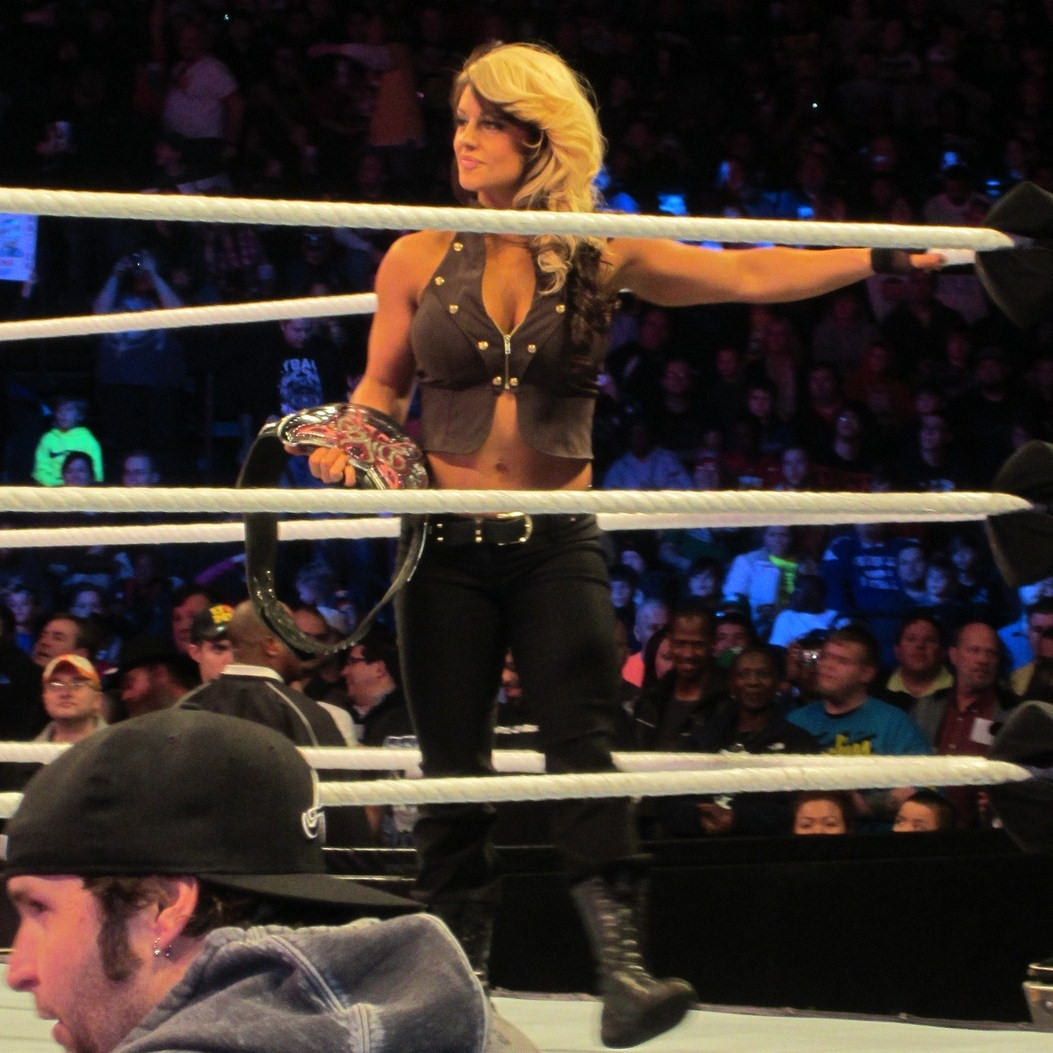
Kaitlyn as the WWE Divas Champion in February 2013

Kaitlyn's first challenger was Tamina Snuka, whom she defeated at Elimination Chamber on February 17, 2013, to retain the title. Later that month, a storyline relationship between herself and Cody Rhodes was teased, but she ultimately decided against it after seeing him with the Bella Twins. An angle between Kaitlyn and Layla was also teased, with Kaitlyn losing a non-title match against Tamina Snuka due to Layla's villainous theatrics. Kaitlyn successfully defended her championship in matches on NXT against Natalya and AJ Lee.

On March 25, Kaitlyn brawled backstage with her former tag partner AJ Lee and faced her in a match, losing via countout. Later that week, Kaitlyn got revenge on AJ in a mixed tag team match, also involving Daniel Bryan and Dolph Ziggler. AJ then became the number one contender to her Divas title. Meanwhile, Kaitlyn began a storyline where she received gifts from a secret admirer. On June 10, after setting Big E Langston to pose as the admirer, AJ revealed it to be a mind game, berated Kaitlyn and left her in tears. Six days later at Payback, Kaitlyn was defeated by AJ, ending her reign at 153 days. The feud between the two continued with them attempting to distract each other to gain leverage. On the July 12 episode of SmackDown, Kaitlyn participated in the first-ever public Divas Championship match contract signing along with AJ, which ended in a brawl between the two. Two days later at Money in the Bank, Kaitlyn lost their rematch.

==== Final feuds and retirement (2013–2014) ====
Kaitlyn faced AJ in a non-title match on July 29, where Kaitlyn emerged victorious. This led to Kaitlyn receiving another championship opportunity against AJ in her hometown on the August 2 episode of SmackDown, but she was defeated after the villainous Layla betrayed her. On the August 5 episode of Raw, Kaitlyn lost a match against Layla after being distracted by AJ. Later that night, she attacked AJ during a match between Ziggler and Langston, accidentally costing Ziggler the match. At SummerSlam on August 18, Kaitlyn and Ziggler defeated AJ and Langston in a mixed tag team match, ending their feud.

At Survivor Series, Kaitlyn participated in a seven-on-seven traditional elimination tag team match as her team took on the cast of Total Divas. Kaitlyn managed two eliminations before she was eliminated, with her team ultimately losing the match. On January 8, 2014, Kaitlyn decided to terminate her contract with WWE. Her final match aired that night on Main Event, where she lost to AJ Lee. In her final address, she stated that she will return to the fitness industry.

On July 17, 2014, Kaitlyn stated that she considered herself retired from WWE and planned to walk away from the wrestling business to focus on her marriage and clothing line.

=== Independent circuit (2018–2019) ===
On December 22, 2017, Coastal Championship Wrestling announced that Bonin was to come out of retirement and make her in-ring return on February 10, 2018. At the event, titled Breaking Chains, Bonin competed under her real name and defeated Rachael Ellering in singles action.

On October 27, 2019, Bonin defeated Black Widow and Katie Forbes to become the inaugural Slamforce Africa Women's Champion.

=== Return to WWE (2018–2019) ===
On July 11, 2018, WWE announced that Kaitlyn would make her return to the company for the first time in four and a half years as one of the participants to compete in the 2018 Mae Young Classic tournament. On August 8, in her first match back, Kaitlyn defeated Kavita Devi in the first round match, but she was eliminated in the second round by Mia Yim on August 9.

On July 22, 2019, Kaitlyn appeared during a backstage segment at the Raw Reunion show alongside Torrie Wilson, Alicia Fox, and Santino Marella.

In October 2026, Bonin stated that she did not wish to return to in-ring wrestling.

== Other media ==
Bonin occasionally contributes interviews, photo ops, and blogs to the bodybuilding website Hardbody.

Bonin appeared on the cover of the April 2016 edition of Iron Man magazine.

As Kaitlyn, Bonin made her sole video game appearance as a playable character in WWE 2K14.

== Business ventures ==
On June 25, 2014, Bonin launched a fitness clothing company named Celestial Bodiez. She is also a spokesperson for Blackstone Labs and Prime Nutrition, which her ex-husband PJ Braun owns.

In June 2015, Bonin and Braun opened a smoothie bar inside the Busy Body Fitness Center in Boca Raton, Florida.

== Personal life ==
Bonin married bodybuilder PJ Braun on June 20, 2014, and they divorced on September 26, 2017.

== Filmography ==
Television
| Year | Title | Role | Notes |
|---|---|---|---|
| 2020 | WWE Chronicle | Herself | Episode: “Drew McIntyre” |
| 2020 | Drew & A | Herself | Episode: “John Edward Seance with Superstars” |

Podcasts
| Year | Title | Role | Notes |
|---|---|---|---|
| 2020 | Ring The Belle | Herself | 1 episode |
| 2023 | Mike Lewis Podcast | Herself | 1 episode |

== Championships and accomplishments ==
=== Body fitness ===
- National Physique Committee
  - John Sherman Classic Bodybuilding Figure and Fitness Championship
  - Arnold Classic NPC Figure Class D Competition (Fifth place)

=== Professional wrestling ===
- Defiant Pro Wrestling
  - DPW Women's Championship (1 time)
- Pro Wrestling Illustrated
  - Ranked No. 5 of the top 50 female wrestlers in the PWI Female 50 in 2013
- Slamforce Africa
  - SFA Women's Championship (1 time)
- Wrestling Observer Newsletter
  - Worst Worked Match of the Year (2010) vs. Maxine on NXT on October 19
  - Worst Worked Match of the Year (2013) 14-woman elimination tag team match at Survivor Series on November 24
- WWE
  - WWE Divas Championship (1 time)
  - Ranked No. 49 of the top 50 Greatest WWE Female Superstars of all time (2021)
  - NXT winner (season 3)
