= Shaul Guerrero =

American professional wrestler (born 1990)

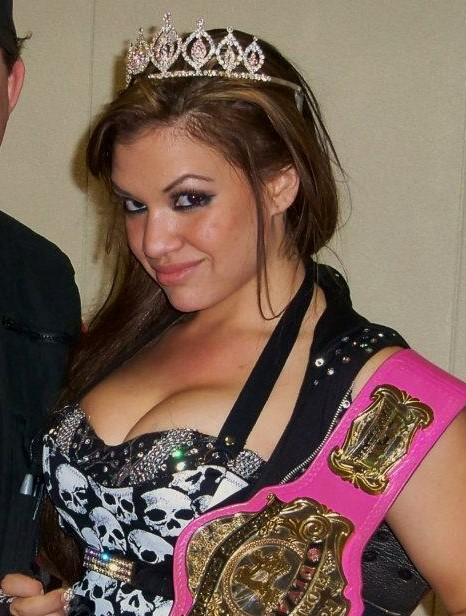
- Guerrero in 2011

Personal information
- Born: Shaul Marie Guerrero; October 14, 1990 (age 36) El Paso, Texas, U.S.
- Education: New Mexico State University
- Spouse: Matthew Rehwoldt (m. 2016)
- Parent(s): Eddie Guerrero; Vickie Guerrero
- Family: Guerrero

Professional wrestling career
- Ring name(s): Shaul Guerrero; Raquel Diaz
- Billed height: 5 ft 3 in (160 cm)
- Billed from: El Paso, Texas
- Trained by: Florida Championship Wrestling; WWE Performance Center
- Debut: February 11, 2011
- Retired: 2020

Shaul Marie Guerrero (born October 14, 1990) is an American burlesque performer and retired professional wrestler and ring announcer. She is best known for her time with World Wrestling Entertainment (WWE), where she performed under the ring name Raquel Diaz. As a burlesque dancer she often performs under the stage name Miss Nyxon.

In October 2010, Guerrero signed a developmental contract with WWE, and was assigned to Florida Championship Wrestling (FCW), WWE's developmental territory. In November 2011, Guerrero became the Queen of FCW, a title she held for 119 days, until it was deactivated. In December 2011, Guerrero won the FCW Divas Championship for the first time, and became the longest reigning FCW Divas Champion. In July 2012, Guerrero debuted in WWE's re-branded developmental territory, NXT, before leaving the company in April 2014.

== Early life ==
Guerrero was born in El Paso, Texas, and is the eldest daughter of Vickie Guerrero and the late Eddie Guerrero. Guerrero has a younger sister named Sherilyn Amber Guerrero, and a half-sister named Kaylie Marie Guerrero. Prior to joining WWE, Guerrero was a singer and a model while attending New Mexico State University. She has sung the national anthem at Florida Championship Wrestling events.

== Professional wrestling career ==
=== World Wrestling Entertainment/WWE (2010-2014) ===
==== Florida Championship Wrestling (2010–2012) ====
On October 26, 2010, World Wrestling Entertainment (WWE) signed Guerrero to a developmental contract, and she was assigned to Florida Championship Wrestling (FCW), WWE's developmental territory, based in Tampa, Florida. She made her debut in December 2010, appearing at ringside for a FCW Divas Championship match between AJ Lee and Naomi Knight. She made her in-ring debut at the February 11, 2011, television tapings under the ring name Raquel Diaz, where she and Naomi lost a tag team match to AJ and Aksana. She briefly acted as the manager for Alexander Rusev, before joining The Ascension faction, with Conor O'Brian, Kenneth Cameron, and Tito Colon, all of whom she began managing.

On the November 17 episode of FCW TV, Diaz defeated Aksana to become the new Queen of FCW. A month later, on the December 15 episode of FCW TV, Diaz defeated Audrey Marie to win the FCW Divas Championship, holding both the championship and the crown simultaneously. She retained the championship against Marie and Sofia Cortez, before FCW General Manager Summer Rae deactivated the Queen of FCW crown, leaving Diaz as the last champion, with her reign ending at 119 days. Diaz again defeated Audrey Marie to retain the championship in April. After losing a triple threat match to Paige in May, Diaz defended and successfully retained the championship against Paige by disqualification. Diaz lost the FCW Divas Championship on June 29 during a live event to Caylee Turner, ending her reign at 197 days.

==== NXT (2012–2014) ====
WWE went on to re-brand FCW into NXT, taped at Full Sail University in Orlando, Florida. Diaz's NXT television debut took place on the July 18, 2012, episode of NXT under the character of an "ultra diva" on an "exfoliating ugliness tour", and defeated Paige in a singles match. As part of her new character, she began drawing "L"s on the foreheads of other Divas after defeating them. On September 27, 2012, it was reported that Guerrero had requested and been granted a release from her developmental contract. Guerrero confirmed her departure from WWE three days later.

In September 2013, Guerrero returned to WWE's developmental territory. At this time, it was reported that she was never officially released, but was given a leave of absence to attend school. On April 30, 2014, it was reported that WWE had released Guerrero, with her failing to appear on television during her second run with the company. In August 2014, Guerrero stated that she left WWE due to an ongoing eating disorder.

=== Independent circuit (2018; 2020–present) ===
On February 17, 2018, Guerrero made her return to professional wrestling as a commentator at the Reality of Wrestling event, Ladies Night Out. In September, Guerrero signed a contract with Women of Wrestling to work as a ring announcer. She also appeared on Lucha Underground as the ring announcer during the season finale, Ultima Lucha Cuatro. On December 4, 2020, Guerrero made her independent wrestling in ring debut when she competed in a tournament to crown the first ever GCW Women's Champion. She defeated Renee Michelle in the first round, but lost to Queen Aminata in the second round.

=== All Elite Wrestling (2020) ===
On August 3, 2020, Guerrero served as ring announcer for All Elite Wrestling's AEW Women's Tag Team Cup Tournament.

== Other media ==
In 2018, Guerrero started performing burlesque in the Chicago area under the stage name Miss Nyxon. That same year, she appeared in the annual Maxim Cover Girl social media contest, finishing third in the Southwest Group Twelve.

== Personal life ==
In December 2014, Guerrero got engaged to professional wrestler Matt Rehwoldt, who was once known by the ring name Aiden English. They were married on January 3, 2016.

== Championships and accomplishments ==
- Defiant Pro Wrestling
  - DPW Women's Championship (1 time)
- Florida Championship Wrestling
  - FCW Divas Championship (1 time)
  - Queen of FCW (1 time, final)
