= Angela Fong =

Canadian professional wrestler and model

Personal information
- Born: Angela Carolyn Fong; February 3, 1985 (age 41) Vancouver, British Columbia, Canada
- Spouse: Phil Habeger (m. 2015)
- Children: 2

Professional wrestling career
- Ring name(s): Angela Fong; Black Lotus; Miss Angela; Savannah
- Billed height: 5 ft 5 in (165 cm)
- Billed weight: 120 lb (54 kg)
- Billed from: Hong Kong, China; Vancouver, British Columbia, Canada
- Trained by: Florida Championship Wrestling
- Debut: 2007
- Retired: 2018

Angela Carolyn Fong (born February 3, 1985) is a Canadian retired professional wrestler, model, ring announcer, cheerleader and actress. She is best known for her time at WWE from 2007 to 2010 under the ring name Savannah, and at Lucha Underground from 2014 to 2019, under the ring name Black Lotus.

Prior to her career in professional wrestling, she was a cheerleader for the BC Lions of the Canadian Football League (CFL).

== Professional wrestling career ==
=== World Wrestling Entertainment (2007–2010) ===
Fong tried out for the 2007 Diva Search, but she did not become one of the finalists. In February 2008, WWE signed Fong to a developmental deal and was shown briefly on OVW with Shawn Spears.

Fong debuted on FCW in early 2008. She initially started as a valet for The Puerto Rican Nightmares (Eddie Colón and Eric Perez) where they feuded with Nick Nemeth, Brad Allen and Taryn Terrell. The Puerto Rican Nightmares broke up and Angela started to wrestle more. On the February 5 episode of FCW television tapings, Angela defeated Alicia Fox in the finals to become the first ever Queen of FCW. Fong and Rosa Mendes established a feud when Mendes tried to steal the crown from Angela. On April 19, 2009, edition of FCW, Rosa Mendes challenged Angela for the Queen of FCW Crown only to be attacked by Doctor X, so she won by DQ. After defending the crown for seven months, Fong was defeated by Mia Mancini. During her time on ECW/NXT Fong still would make appearances in FCW including competing in a tournament for the new FCW Divas Championship, but lost to Naomi Night in the second round.

On September 15, 2009, Fong debuted as Savannah on ECW as a backstage interviewer. Fong spent most of her time as the ECW backstage interviewer, until ECW ring announcer Lauren Mayhew departed from the WWE which Fong took over the role as the ring announcer of the show. She was also a lumberjill during Michelle McCool and Melina's match on the October 2, 2009, episode of SmackDown!, namely during the 10th anniversary of SmackDown. After the ECW brand was closed down on February 16, 2010, and was replaced with NXT, she joined the WWE NXT broadcast team as the official ring announcer for the first season of NXT. At WrestleMania XXVI, she was the ring announcer for the preshow battle royal and the Money in the Bank ladder match. On June 23, 2010, Fong was released from her WWE contract.

=== Independent circuit (2010–2013) ===
Fong began wrestling in the independent circuit, under her real name and competed in her first post-WWE match in the organization, Ground Breaking Pro Wrestling on September 26, 2010, when she defeated Randi West to win the vacant GBPW Ladies Championship and became its first champion. On May 4, 2013, Fong defeated Miyako Matsumoto in a match for Ice Ribbon.

=== Lucha Underground (2014–2018) ===
In 2014, it was confirmed that Fong would return to the wrestling scene appearing for the new Lucha Underground wrestling series. She made her official television appearance during the November 26, 2014, episode where she was seen briefly watching the match between Son of Havoc and Mascarita Sagrada. She later appeared in many matches over the weeks spectating over different competitors in the Lucha Underground roster. Her role was revealed at the ending of the 28 January 2015 episode where she approached Lucha Underground owner Dario Cueto claiming to be looking for a man named Matanza. It was also revealed on the 4 February episode that she goes by the alias of Black Lotus.

On the June 3 episode, Cueto imprisoned Black Lotus for trying to kill his brother. Lotus was captured by Chavo Guerrero and the Crew, as Guerrero betrayed Lotus to Cueto in exchange for protection from Mexican enemies. At part one of Lucha Underground's Ultima Lucha, Cueto admitted to Black Lotus that "the Monster" Matanza is his brother, forced by their father to partake in underground fighting. He claimed that it was El Dragon Azteca who had killed Lotus' parents while framing Matanza for the deed (this was later revealed to be a lie). Despite Azteca trying to save Lotus, Lotus attacked and seemingly killed Azteca on part two of Ultima Lucha on August 5, 2015, also the first-season finale. Cueto then freed Lotus, claiming that Azteca's death had endangered them and they needed to leave. Cueto and Lotus fled along with Matanza, while the show closed with the Temple being abandoned.

Throughout Season 2, Lotus would act as the bodyguard to Dario Cueto both during their absence from the temple, and later when they resurfaced there. On the Season 2 Finale at Ultima Lucha Dos, she competed in her first televised match against El Dragon Azteca Jr. where the match went to a no contest due to Pentagón Dark breaking her arm. On November 16 episode of Lucha Underground during the Aztec Warfare III she returned to the temple along with The Black Lotus Triad members Hitokiri, Doku and Yurei and all four attacked Pentagón Dark, allowing Johnny Mundo to eliminate him, thus costing him the match.

== Other media ==
Since 2005, Fong has been pursuing an acting career in television shows and movies. Fong appeared as a contestant on Let's Make a Deal, where she won a purse and a $500 gift card. On June 7, 2012, Fong appeared as one of the girls looking for a date on Take Me Out, where she appeared on every episode during the season. She also competed on the hit Comedy.tv game show Who Wants to Date a Comedian?, where she won a date with Nestor Rodriguez.

== Personal life ==
Fong married Phil Habeger on September 6, 2015. The couple's first child, a daughter, was born in December 2020. Their second child, a son, was born in October 2023.

== Championships and accomplishments ==
- Florida Championship Wrestling
  - Queen of FCW (1 time)
  - Queen of FCW Tournament (2009)
- Ground Breaking Pro Wrestling
  - GBPW Ladies Championship (1 time)
