= FCW (TV series) =

Professional wrestling television program for Florida Championship Wrestling

- Created by: Steve Keirn; Vince McMahon
- Starring: FCW roster
- Opening theme: "Monster Rock" by Tony Clarke
- Country of origin: United States
- No. of seasons: 5
- No. of episodes: 197

Production
- Camera setup: Multicamera setup
- Running time: 60 minutes (including commercials)

Original release
- Network: Bright House Sports Network (2008–2012)
- Release: October 5, 2008 – July 15, 2012

Related
- WWE NXT

FCW was a professional wrestling television program for Florida Championship Wrestling, WWE's developmental territory. It debuted on October 5, 2008 on Bright House Sports Network in Tampa Bay and Central Florida and ran for close to four years until it aired its final episode on July 15, 2012. Its concept was merged with WWE NXT, where developmental wrestlers were previously appearing, in its sixth season.

The first episode was taped on July 17, 2008, at the opening of their new arena. The final taping was held June 1, 2012.

== Special episodes ==
Episode	Date	Notes
FCW	October 5, 2008	Series debut.
FCW 100th episode	August 29, 2010	Celebrated the show's 100th episode.
March of Champions	March 13, 2011	All of the developmental championships and accomplishments on the line.
FCW: The Final Episode	July 15, 2012	Series finale.
