= 2010 WWE Draft =

WWE's intra-brand draft

2010 WWE draft

General information
- Sport: Professional wrestling
- Date: April 26–27, 2010
- Location: Richmond, Virginia

Overview
- League: World Wrestling Entertainment
- Teams: Raw; SmackDown

The 2010 World Wrestling Entertainment (WWE) draft was the eighth WWE draft, produced by the American professional wrestling promotion World Wrestling Entertainment. The draft took place over two days: the first day was televised live for three hours on April 26, and the second part, the "supplemental draft", was held on April 27. The first day was broadcast on WWE's Monday night program Raw on the USA Network in the United States, (Note: In addition to the United States, Raw is broadcast in various countries.) and the supplemental draft was available on WWE's official website. The televised portion was held at Richmond Coliseum in Richmond, Virginia. During the production of the draft, guest hosts were portrayed as authority figure characters on Raw; however, due to the importance of the event, the draft was run by the WWE management backstage, as are all other WWE programs.

Unlike sports draft lotteries where players are signed to a team, WWE drafts featured the exchanging of employees between WWE's two brands. The 2010 WWE draft marked the fifth time that only the Raw and SmackDown brands were involved; wrestlers along with other WWE personalities from these brands were eligible to be drafted. This was the first draft since 2005 to not feature the ECW brand, due to its disbandment on February 16, 2010. For the televised portion, matches determined which brand received a random draft selection. During the supplemental draft, brand and employee selections were conducted randomly. Based on 2009 regulations, drafted champions took their titles to their new brands, and tag teams were not exempt from being selected. Unlike the previous year's draft where each selection was for only one individual, 2010 featured two instances where at least two employees were drafted in one pick.

Overall, 21 employees from the company's roster were drafted in 19 selections, the fewest in a single night draft show (that featured supplemental drafting) since 2004. Eight selections were made on television (four from each brand), while the supplemental draft saw eleven draft picks (five by Raw and six by SmackDown) that featured 13 draftees. Of the 21 selected personalities, seventeen were males (seven drafted on television) and three were females (one drafted on television). All but one draftee was a wrestler: The Great Khali's manager Ranjin Singh, who came to Raw in the supplemental draft along with Khali in one draft pick. SmackDown obtained the first draft pick by winning the first match, which resulted in the acquisition of the only drafted female wrestler on television, Kelly Kelly; John Morrison was Raw's first selection after winning the third match. In the supplemental draft, Unified WWE Tag Team Champions The Hart Dynasty (Tyson Kidd and David Hart Smith) were drafted as one selection to Raw, with their valet Natalya Neidhart drafted as a separate pick. In addition to Smith being drafted to Raw, Chavo Guerrero Jr., Montel Vontavious Porter, and Hornswoggle (who were all drafted to SmackDown) were acquired by the brand for which they made their debuts in WWE.

== Background ==
The Brand Extension storyline was initiated in March 2002, in which WWE's Raw and SmackDown television programs were made into brands (similar to conferences within a league) to which employees were assigned to; the ECW brand additionally involved between 2006 and 2009. Since its inception, annual drafts have followed, except for in 2003. As in previous drafts that followed the Brand Extension, the purpose of the 2010 WWE Draft was to increase television ratings of WWE programming and refresh the rosters with new storylines for each brand. The 2010 WWE Draft was confirmed both by WWE and Richmond Coliseum via their websites between March and April 2010, which featured the draft eligibility of WWE employees from the Raw and SmackDown brands. The event was scheduled to take place over two days, in which the televised draft would air live on the USA Network in the United States from the Coliseum in Richmond, Virginia, on the April 26 episode of Raw. The second portion of the draft, the "supplemental draft," was originally scheduled for April 28; however, it was announced during the live broadcast that it would be held the next day on April 27 with selections being announced via WWE's website.

== Selections ==
=== Televised draft ===
During Raw, six matches were held among representatives of the two brands to determine which would receive a draft pick; except for one match that was for three selections, the others were for one. Each match featured a wrestler representing their brand; if a wrestler was drafted earlier in the program, they would represent their new brand. After the matches, a computerized system, which appeared on the Raw stage TitanTron, randomly (Note: Although WWE claimed the draft was conducted randomly, the results were predetermined since the draft is a storyline.) selected a member from the opposing brand's roster for the winning brand.

==== Matches ====
No.	Results	Stipulations
1	Team Lay-Cool (Layla and Michelle McCool) (SmackDown) defeated Maryse and Eve Torres (Raw)	Tag team match for 1 female-only draft pick
2	CM Punk (SmackDown) defeated Evan Bourne (Raw)	Singles match for 1 draft pick
3	Santino Marella and Ted DiBiase (Raw) won by last eliminating Rey Mysterio (SmackDown) (Note: Other match participants: Raw; Montel Vontavious Porter, Mark Henry, and Yoshi Tatsu. SmackDown; Kane, R-Truth, Drew McIntyre, and Shad Gaspard.)	10-man Battle royal for 3 draft picks
4	Chris Jericho (SmackDown) defeated Christian (Raw)	Singles match for 1 draft pick
5	Jack Swagger (SmackDown) defeated John Morrison (Note: John Morrison was originally a SmackDown member, but represented Raw after being drafted earlier in the evening.) (Raw)	Singles match for 1 draft pick
6	Hornswoggle (Raw) defeated Dolph Ziggler (SmackDown)	Singles match for 1 draft pick

==== Selections ====
Pick No.	Brand (to)	Employee	Role	Brand (from)	Notes
1	SmackDown	Kelly Kelly	Female wrestler	Raw	
2	SmackDown	Big Show	Male wrestler	Raw	Split of ShoMiz
3	Raw	John Morrison	Male wrestler	SmackDown	
4	Raw	R-Truth	Male wrestler	SmackDown	
5	Raw	Edge	Male wrestler	SmackDown	
6	SmackDown	Kofi Kingston	Male wrestler	Raw	
7	SmackDown	Christian	Male wrestler	Raw	
8	Raw	Chris Jericho	Male wrestler	SmackDown	

=== Supplemental draft ===
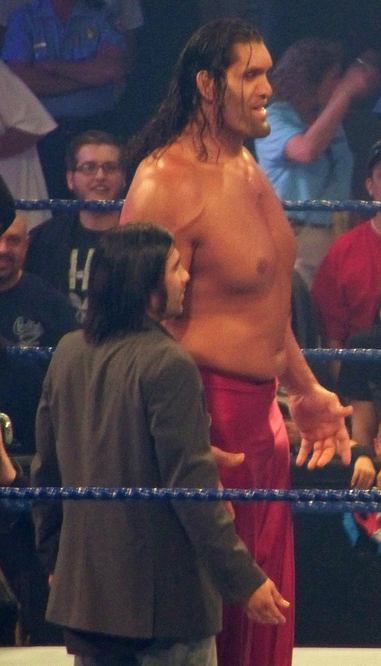
Ranjin Singh (left) and The Great Khali (right) made up the ninth overall pick in the 2010 WWE draft.

Pick No.	Brand (to)	Employee	Role	Brand (from)	Notes
9	Raw	The Great Khali and Ranjin Singh (Note: Both men were drafted in unison.)	Male wrestler and manager	SmackDown	
10	SmackDown	Chavo Guerrero	Male wrestler	Raw	
11	SmackDown	Cody Rhodes	Male wrestler	Raw	
12	Raw	Natalya	Female wrestler	SmackDown	
13	SmackDown	Chris Masters	Male wrestler	Raw	
14	Raw	Ezekiel Jackson	Male wrestler	SmackDown	
15	Raw	Goldust	Male wrestler	SmackDown	
16	SmackDown	Hornswoggle	Male wrestler	Raw	
17	SmackDown	Rosa Mendes	Female wrestler	Raw	
18	Raw	The Hart Dynasty (David Hart Smith and Tyson Kidd)	Male tag team	SmackDown	World Tag Team Champions and WWE Tag Team Champions (Unified WWE Tag Team Champions) while drafted.
19	SmackDown	MVP	Male wrestler	Raw	

== Response and aftermath ==
Following the televised draft, Josh Mathews, a commentator and interviewer for WWE, interviewed various wrestlers who switched brands. They included Big Show, Christian, Kelly Kelly, Kofi Kingston, John Morrison, and R-Truth, who all stated that they viewed their new brands as an opportunity to engage in combat with new competitors and to achieve new success. Based on the 2009 regulations, champions that were drafted would carry their titles with them to their new brand. As opposed to previous drafts, this was the first to not feature a championship exchange brands since 2007. (Note: Although The Hart Dynasty were the reigning Unified WWE Tag Team Champions at the time that they were drafted, the championship was available to both brands as opposed to only one.) Similar to 2007, no tag teams were affected by the draft since tag teams and stables were drafted to the same brand either as a single draft pick or consisting of several draft picks to a new brand. The two alliances that switched brands were the stable of The Hart Dynasty (Kidd, Natalya, and Smith), in which Kidd and Smith were in unison and Natalya consisted of a separate draft pick, and The Great Khali and Ranjin Singh, who were also drafted as one selection in the supplemental draft.

The draft had little effect on the WWE's television ratings. Despite not having direct involvement in the draft, NXT and WWE Superstars were a part of the weekly television lineup for the company and featured wrestlers from both brands. Generally, the ratings of the four shows during the week of the draft were consistent with the ratings of each from the previous week. The ratings for WWE programming the week before the draft were the following: the April 19 episode of Raw was watched by an average of 4.10 million viewers in the first hour and 4.20 in the second hour for an average 3.05 rating, WWE NXT on April 20 was watched by 1.21 million viewers for a 0.90 rating, the April 22 episode of WWE Superstars earned a 0.64 rating, (Note: Viewership details were not published and available via a reliable source of information.) while the April 23 episode of SmackDown was watched by 3.09 million viewers and earned a 1.8 rating. The draft episode of Raw was watched by 3.90 million viewers in its first hour, 4.99 in its second hour, and 4.98 in its final hour for an average of 3.07 rating. In the normal two-hour time slot for Raw, the show would have received a 3.4 rating. Later that week, WWE NXT was watched by 1,069,000 viewers for a 0.79 rating, WWE Superstars earned a 0.76 rating with 754,000 viewers, and SmackDown was watched by 2,718,000 million viewers for a 1.7 rating.

== See also ==
- History of WWE
