= 2011 WWE Draft =

WWE's intra-brand draft

2011 WWE draft

General information
- Sport: Professional wrestling
- Date: April 25, 2011
- Location: Raleigh, North Carolina

Overview
- League: WWE
- Teams: Raw; SmackDown

The 2011 WWE draft was the ninth and final overall WWE draft before the first WWE brand extension ended on August 29, produced by the American professional wrestling promotion WWE, which took place on April 25. With a core business of professional wrestling, the corporation held a draft to exchange personnel assigned to one of its two brands (Raw and SmackDown) that are (in terms of storyline) independent brands that represent WWE. The draft aired live on the USA Network on Raw in the United States (Note: In addition to the United States, Raw is broadcast in various countries.) for two hours in Raleigh, North Carolina, from the RBC Center. As a standard for previous drafts, most on-air personnel were eligible to be drafted. A continuation of the draft took place on WWE's official website at 12:00pm Eastern time on the following afternoon.

Matches determined the recipient of draft picks for the television portion of the draft while the continuation of the draft via the Internet was conducted at random. The draft's 30 selections featured 29 wrestlers being exchanged between WWE's two brands. SmackDown received 16 additional members to its roster while Raw received 13. For the first time in draft history, two of the draft picks consisted of the same wrestler (John Cena) being selected to SmackDown with the first pick and back to Raw with the last televised pick.

== Background ==
The Brand Extension storyline was initiated in March 2002, in which WWE's Raw and SmackDown television programs were made into brands (similar to conferences within a league) to which employees were assigned; the ECW brand was additionally involved between 2006 and 2009. Annual drafts have followed since this occurrence, except for in 2003. As with past drafts, the purpose of the 2011 WWE draft was to increase television ratings of WWE programming and refresh the rosters for each brand. The 2011 event was confirmed by the RBC Center in April 2011, with WWE officially announcing it on the April 18 episode of Raw. A USA Network executive had also confirmed the event to occur via a press release on the same day of the WWE announcement.

The 2011 WWE draft would mark the sixth time that only the Raw and SmackDown brands were involved; male and female wrestlers and other WWE personalities from these brands were eligible to be drafted. Unlike sports draft lotteries where players are signed to a team, WWE drafts feature on-air personnel being exchanged between brands. Like all other WWE programs, the draft was run by the WWE management backstage. Championships could be exchanged between brands if the champion was drafted, like with previous drafts; however, the WWE Divas Championship and WWE Tag Team Championship were accessible to both brands and thus had no role in the draft because of their inter-brand availability.

== Selections ==
Overall, 29 wrestlers were drafted in 30 selections. Eight selections were made on television (four from each brand) with seven draftees; the online draft featured 22 selections (13 by Raw and nine by SmackDown). Of the 29 drafted personalities, only five were females (all drafted after the televised event). All but one of the draftees were in-ring competitors: Alberto Del Rio's personal ring announcer, Ricardo Rodriguez, came to Raw in the televised draft with Alberto Del Rio in one draft pick. SmackDown obtained the first draft pick by winning the first match, which resulted in the acquisition of John Cena. Raw obtained their first pick after winning the second match and were able to acquire Rey Mysterio. Cena became the second person to have changed brands twice during the same draft event (the first was Triple H in 2004, who was drafted to SmackDown then traded back to Raw), with Raw reacquiring Cena with the eighth draft pick to conclude the televised portion. Kelly Kelly became the first woman to be drafted overall and was drafted to the Smackdown brand. The draft also featured various wrestlers being selected to a new brand for the first time in their WWE careers, such as Sheamus and Daniel Bryan.

=== Televised draft ===
During Raw, matches were held among representatives of the two brands to determine which would receive one or two draft picks. Each match featured one or more wrestlers representing their brand; if a wrestler was drafted earlier in the program, they would represent their new brand. After the matches, a computerized system, which appeared on the Raw stage TitanTron, randomly (Note: Although WWE claimed the Draft was conducted randomly, the results were predetermined since the Draft is a storyline.) selected a member from the opposing brand's roster for the winning brand. Unlike the regular Raw production, the lighting in the RBC Center featured red and blue lighting on the audience, like in WWE Superstars, and both programs' logos represented on the TitanTron.

==== Matches ====
No.	Results	Stipulations
1	Big Show and Kofi Kingston (SmackDown) won by last eliminating Mason Ryan (Raw) (Note: Other match participants: Raw; Evan Bourne, Daniel Bryan, Ted DiBiase, Mark Henry, The Great Khali, Vladimir Kozlov, Santino Marella, Sheamus, and Yoshi Tatsu. SmackDown; Brodus Clay, Kane, Chris Masters, Drew McIntyre, Cody Rhodes, and The Corre (Wade Barrett, Ezekiel Jackson, and Heath Slater).)	20-man battle royal for one draft pick
2	Eve (Raw) defeated Layla (SmackDown)	Singles match for one draft pick
3	Kofi Kingston (SmackDown) defeated Sheamus (Raw)	Singles match for one draft pick
4	Randy Orton (Note: This wrestler was originally a Raw member but represented SmackDown after being drafted earlier in the evening.) (SmackDown) defeated Dolph Ziggler (Raw)	Singles match for two draft picks
5	Rey Mysterio (Note: This wrestler was originally a SmackDown member but represented Raw after being drafted earlier in the evening.) (Raw) defeated Wade Barrett (SmackDown)	Singles match for two draft picks
6	The Miz, CM Punk and Alberto Del Rio (Raw) defeated John Cena, (Note: John Cena began in the draft as a Raw member and was drafted with the first pick to SmackDown (resulting his representation of the brand in one of the matches during the televised portion); however, he was ultimately drafted back to Raw with the final pick.) Christian and Mark Henry (SmackDown)	6-man tag team match for one draft pick

==== Selections ====
Pick No.	Brand (to)	Employee	Brand (from)	Notes
1	SmackDown	John Cena	Raw	
2	Raw	Rey Mysterio	SmackDown	
3	SmackDown	Randy Orton	Raw	
4	SmackDown	Mark Henry	Raw	
5	SmackDown	Sin Cara	Raw	
6	Raw	Big Show	SmackDown	WWE Tag Team Champion
7	Raw	Alberto Del Rio and Ricardo Rodriguez (Note: This person was drafted alongside the drafted wrestler)	SmackDown	
8	Raw	John Cena	SmackDown	

=== Online draft ===
WWE announced that the draft would continue to take place over WWE.com on Tuesday, April 26, 2011, beginning at 12:00pm Eastern time.

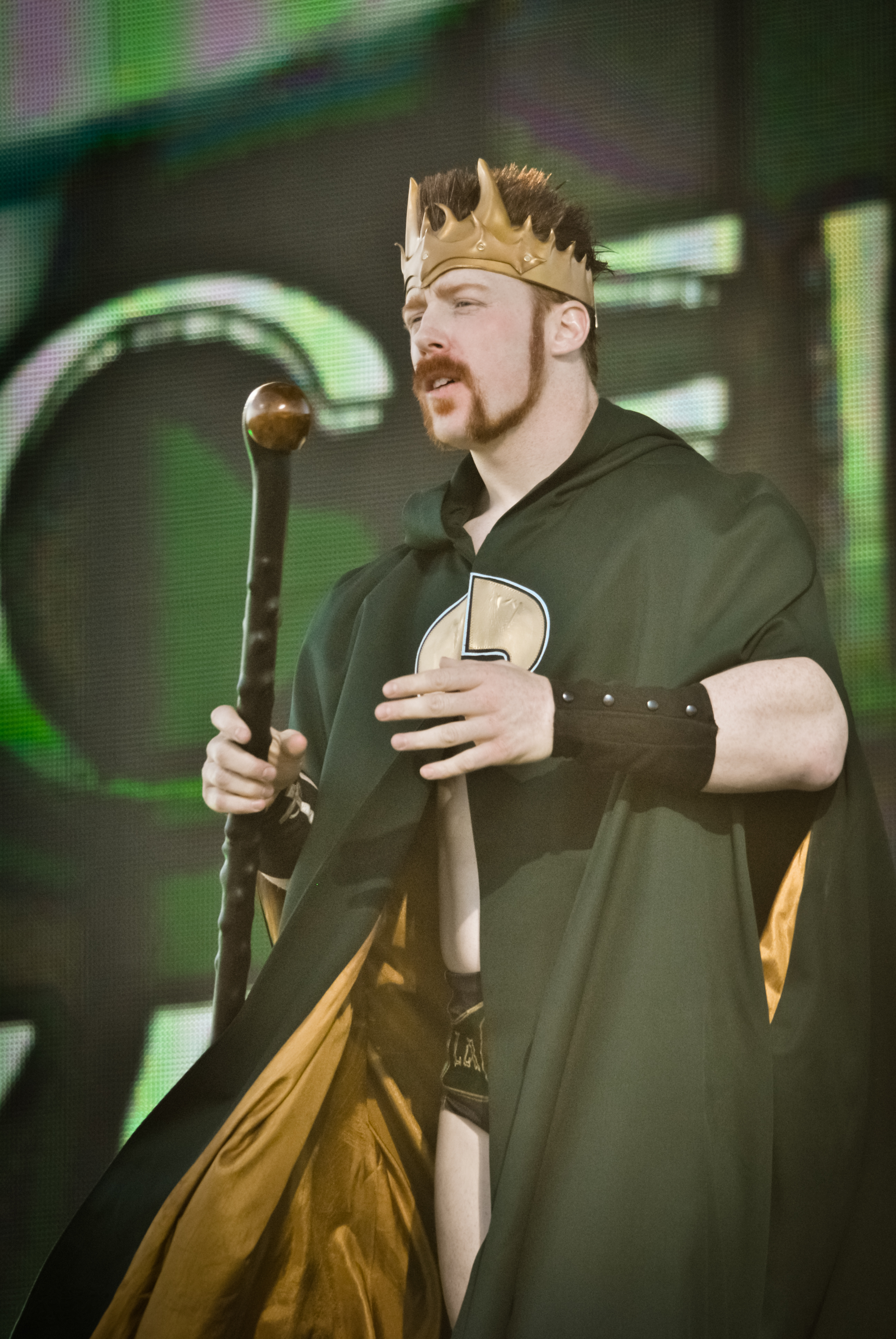
Sheamus was the final overall selection in the 2011 WWE draft.

Pick No.	Brand (to)	Employee	Brand (from)	Notes
9	SmackDown	Daniel Bryan	Raw	
10	Raw	Jack Swagger	SmackDown	
11	SmackDown	The Great Khali	Raw	
12	SmackDown	Jimmy Uso	Raw	Member of The Usos
13	Raw	Kelly Kelly	SmackDown	
14	Raw	JTG	SmackDown	
15	SmackDown	Alicia Fox	Raw	
16	SmackDown	William Regal	Raw	
17	SmackDown	Yoshi Tatsu	Raw	
18	Raw	Drew McIntyre	SmackDown	
19	SmackDown	Natalya	Raw	
20	Raw	Curt Hawkins	SmackDown	
21	Raw	Chris Masters	SmackDown	Never appeared on this brand as his contract was released
22	SmackDown	Jey Uso	Raw	Member of The Usos
23	Raw	Kofi Kingston	SmackDown	
24	SmackDown	Ted DiBiase	Raw	
25	SmackDown	Tyson Kidd	Raw	
26	SmackDown	Tamina	Raw	
27	Raw	Tyler Reks	SmackDown	
28	SmackDown	Alex Riley (Note: The draft pick was nullified due to Riley being under a personal service contract to The Miz, and not an official WWE contract. Riley officially signed with Raw on May 30, 2011.)	Raw	
29	Raw	Beth Phoenix	SmackDown	
30	SmackDown	Sheamus	Raw	WWE United States Champion

== Response and aftermath ==
Various WWE wrestlers posted updates on their Twitter accounts (as mentioned during the televised portion of the Draft) regarding their reactions to draft selections. Most of these regarded Raw losing top-tier talent to SmackDown, such as Cena and Orton switching brands. Mark Henry stated that with his recent weight loss, he was more determined to seek a championship reign on SmackDown. Rey Mysterio also was hopeful about his new home and explained that he would represent Raw just as proud as he has for the majority of his WWE career with SmackDown. The first and final pick in the televised event, John Cena, stated how he wanted to make history for 2011 and that it only begun by being the first person to ever be drafted officially first and last. Finally, Big Show was stunned by his selection but looked forward to the transition from broadcast delay to live television.

As a result of Sheamus holding the United States Championship, the title would be designated back to SmackDown (though the title would quickly go back to Raw due to Kofi Kingston's victory at Extreme Rules five nights later). Big Show being one half of the WWE Tag Team Champions allowed him to appear on both shows (as did his partner Kane), despite their brand designations. During the time that the Draft was produced, WWE was promoting their annual Extreme Rules pay-per-view event. At the time of production, the matches scheduled were between members of their respective rosters before the draft. These matches (including championships bouts) were scheduled to still take place while being official members to their new brands. As a result of the extra promotion, the April 25 episode of Raw increased viewership from the previous week in terms of adults from 1.6 and 1.7 to 2.0 and 1.9 for the first and second hours, respectively.

On the August 29 episode of Raw, it was announced that performers from Raw and SmackDown were no longer exclusive to their respective brand. Subsequently, championships previously exclusive to one show or the other were available for wrestlers from any show to compete for; this would mark the end of the brand extension, as all programming and live events featured the full WWE roster. In a 2013 interview with Advertising Age, Stephanie McMahon explained that WWE's decision to end the brand extension was due to wanting their content to flow across television and online platforms. However, the brand split was reintroduced in July 2016, when SmackDown began broadcasting live on Tuesdays.

== See also ==
- History of WWE
