= 2008 WWE Draft =

WWE's intra-brand draft

2008 WWE draft

General information
- Sport: Professional wrestling
- Date(s): June 23 and 25, 2008
- Location: San Antonio, Texas

Overview
- League: World Wrestling Entertainment
- Teams: Raw; SmackDown; ECW

The 2008 World Wrestling Entertainment (WWE) draft, the sixth WWE draft, took place at the AT&T Center in San Antonio, Texas, on June 23. The draft took place live for three hours on Raw. Every WWE wrestler, announcer, commentator, and general manager were eligible to be drafted. Similar to the 2007 WWE draft, wrestlers from each brand competed in matches to win a random draft pick for their brand. Draft picks were kayfabe selected at random via a computer that was shown on the Raw titantron. Like the previous year, a supplemental draft took place on June 25, where draft selections were randomly conducted. The Draft featured the Raw brand randomly drafting ECW Champion Kane from the ECW brand. It also featured the ECW brand drafting WWE United States Champion Matt Hardy from the SmackDown brand. The final selection in the draft was conducted by the SmackDown brand, and they drafted WWE Champion Triple H from the Raw brand. Per pre-draft stipulations, all the three champions brought their respective titles to the brand to which they were drafted. The 2008 Draft was the last to take place in the Ruthless Aggression Era, as the era ended after the SummerSlam PPV.

== Background ==
The draft was announced by WWE Chairman Vince McMahon on the May 26, 2008, episode of Raw. During the announcement, he stated that every WWE performer from all three brands, Raw, ECW, and SmackDown, were eligible to be drafted. On the June 16 episode of Raw, McMahon announced that his McMahon's Million Dollar Mania contest would take place on the same night as the WWE draft. During the contest, McMahon gave away one million dollars to WWE fans. McMahon telephoned fans, who had registered for the contest, at their homes and asked them for a password, which was revealed at the opening of the Raw broadcast. If their answer was correct, he awarded the fan a portion of one million dollars.

On June 24, WWE announced on its website that a supplemental draft would take place on June 25 at noon ET. The supplemental draft, like the previous year, was conducted randomly, with each brand receiving random draft selections. Wrestlers affected by the televised draft were exempt from the supplemental draft. Because professional wrestling is scripted, outcomes are usually predetermined. Unlike years past, during this draft, many employees in WWE were not told whether they were scripted to change brands.

Aside from the Million Dollar Mania contest, the draft was announced to help increase the television ratings of Raw, which had been declining since WrestleMania XXIV. Though the draft helps increase ratings, it is also used as a way to refresh the rosters and create new storylines.

== Selections ==
There were 28 selections conducted in the draft overall. 11 selections were conducted on television, while 17 selections occurred during the supplemental draft. The Raw brand earned five televised selections through their representatives winning five different matches, while they received six supplemental selections. In total, the Raw brand drafted 11 representatives: five on television and six through the supplemental draft. The SmackDown brand earned five television selections through their representatives winning five different matches, while they received seven supplemental selections. In total, the SmackDown brand drafted 12 representatives: five on television and seven through the supplemental draft. The ECW brand earned one televised selection through their representative winning one match, while they received four supplemental selections. In total, the ECW brand drafted five representatives: one on television and four through the supplemental draft. The 28 included two commentators, two Divas, and 24 male wrestlers (two inactive wrestlers and 22 active wrestlers).

=== Televised draft ===
==== Matches ====
During the program, representatives from the Raw, ECW and SmackDown brands were involved in matches that determined which brand received a draft pick. Overall, there were 9 matches, in which Raw won four, ECW won one, SmackDown won three and one resulted in no winner.

No.	Results	Stipulations
1	Triple H (Raw) defeated Mark Henry (SmackDown)	Singles match for 1 draft pick
2	Finlay and Hornswoggle (SmackDown) defeated Carlito and Santino Marella (Raw)	Tag team match for 1 draft pick
3	Hardcore Holly and Cody Rhodes (Raw) defeated Chavo Guerrero and Bam Neely (ECW)	Tag team match for 1 draft pick
4	John Morrison and The Miz (ECW) defeated The Hardys (Matt and Jeff (Note: Jeff Hardy, originally on the Raw brand, was drafted to SmackDown before this match took place.)) (SmackDown)	Tag team match for 1 draft pick
5	Melina and Mickie James (Raw) vs. Natalya and Victoria (SmackDown) ended in disqualification (Note: Picks No. 5 and 6 went to SmackDown and Raw, respectively, after the match resulted in a double-disqualification.)	Tag team match for 1 announcer-only draft pick
6	John Cena (Raw) defeated Edge (SmackDown)	Singles match for 1 draft pick
7	Montel Vontavious Porter (SmackDown) defeated Tommy Dreamer (ECW)	Singles match for 1 draft pick
8	John "Bradshaw" Layfield (Raw) defeated Kofi Kingston (ECW)	Singles match for 1 draft pick
9	Edge (SmackDown) won by lastly eliminating John Cena (Raw) (Note: Other participants included: Raw; Triple H, Batista, CM Punk and Kane. SmackDown; Big Show, The Great Khali, MVP and Jeff Hardy. ECW; Matt Hardy, John Morrison and The Miz, Chavo Guerrero and Shelton Benjamin.)	Tri-branded 15-man Battle royal for 2 draft picks

==== Selections ====
Pick No.	Brand (to)	Superstar	Role	Brand (from)	Notes
1	Raw	Rey Mysterio	Male wrestler	SmackDown	
2	SmackDown	Jeff Hardy	Male wrestler	Raw	
3	Raw	CM Punk	Male wrestler	ECW	Money in the Bank contract holder
4	ECW	Matt Hardy	Male wrestler	SmackDown	WWE United States Champion; Re-signed with the SmackDown brand in 2009, following his kayfabe release from ECW.
5	SmackDown	Jim Ross	Commentator	Raw	
6	Raw	Michael Cole	Commentator	SmackDown	
7	Raw	Batista	Male wrestler	SmackDown	
8	SmackDown	Umaga	Male wrestler	Raw	
9	Raw	Kane	Male wrestler	ECW	ECW Champion
10	SmackDown	Mr. Kennedy	Male wrestler	Raw	
11	SmackDown	Triple H	Male wrestler	Raw	WWE Champion

=== Supplemental draft ===
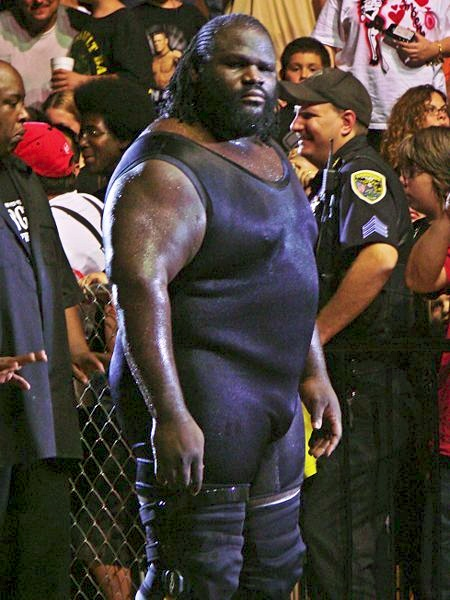
Mark Henry was the 12th pick in the 2008 WWE Draft

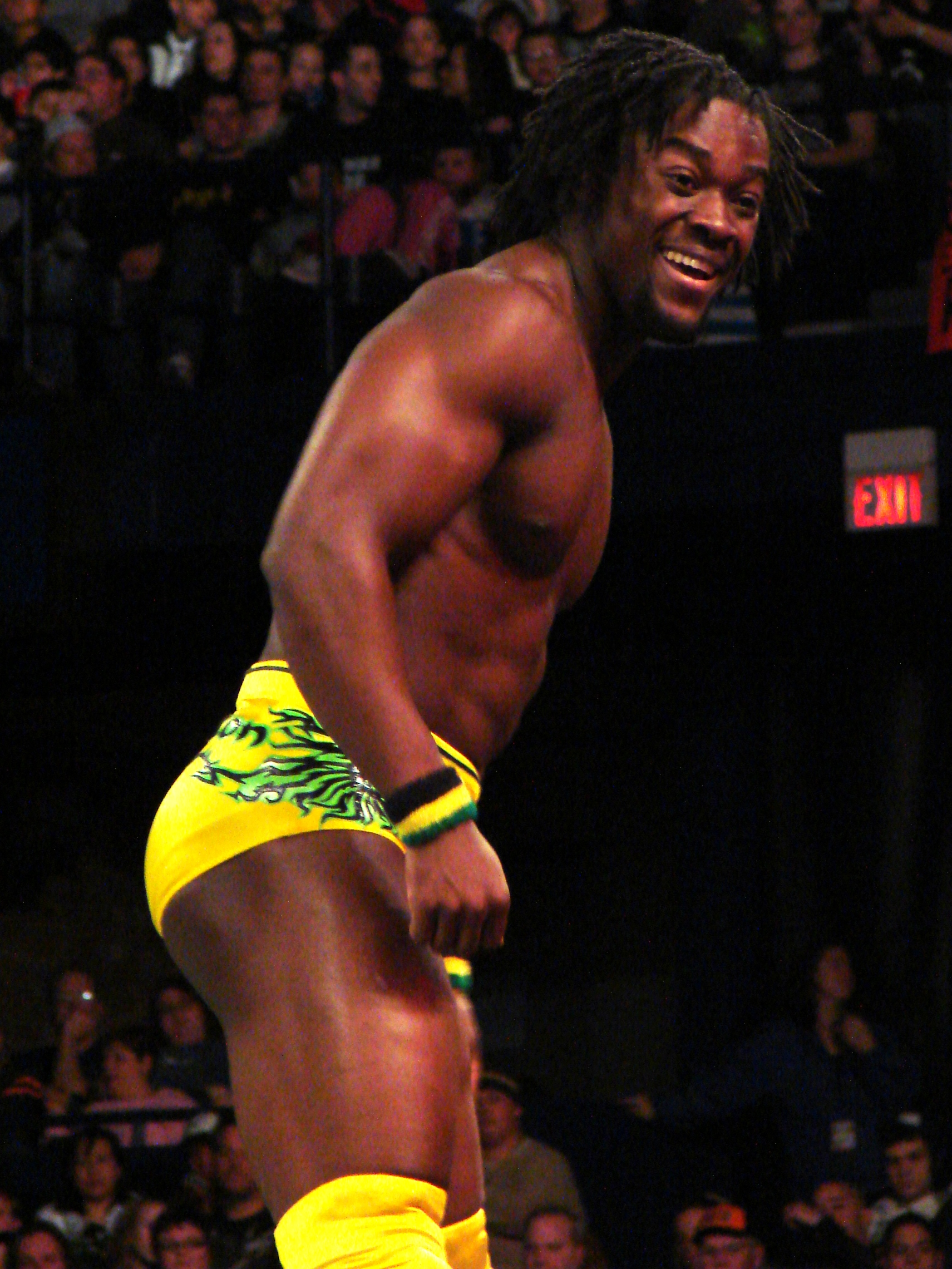
Kofi Kingston was the final, 28th overall, draft pick in the 2008 WWE Draft

Pick No.	Brand (to)	Employee	Role	Brand (from)	Notes
12	ECW	Mark Henry	Male wrestler	SmackDown	
13	Raw	Jamie Noble	Male wrestler	SmackDown	
14	SmackDown	Trevor Murdoch	Male wrestler	Raw	Never appeared on this brand as he was released from his contract
15	SmackDown	Big Daddy V	Male wrestler	ECW	Never appeared on this brand as he was released from his contract
16	Raw	Deuce	Male wrestler	SmackDown	
17	SmackDown	DH Smith	Male wrestler	Raw	Never appeared on this brand as he returned to FCW and was later drafted to ECW the following year without appearing on SmackDown
18	ECW	Hornswoggle	Male wrestler	SmackDown	Alliance with Finlay
19	ECW	Super Crazy	Male wrestler	Raw	
20	Raw	Chuck Palumbo	Male wrestler	SmackDown	Never appeared on this brand as he was released from his contract
21	SmackDown	Brian Kendrick	Male wrestler	Raw	Split of Paul London and Brian Kendrick
22	Raw	Matt Striker	Male wrestler	ECW	
23	SmackDown	Maria	Female wrestler	Raw	
24	SmackDown	Shelton Benjamin	Male wrestler	ECW	
25	ECW	Finlay	Male wrestler	SmackDown	Alliance with Hornswoggle
26	SmackDown	Carlito	Male wrestler	Raw	
27	Raw	Layla	Female wrestler	ECW	
28	Raw	Kofi Kingston	Male wrestler	ECW	

== Aftermath ==
Jim Ross, one of the draftees, was unaware he was to switch brands during the draft. After the draft, Ross was on the verge of quitting his job as a commentator for WWE, as he was angry at the fact he was leaving the Raw brand, where he had commentated for over ten years. Ross stated on his official blog that he was about to quit WWE, but he decided to continue to work for the company and make the best of working on SmackDown. After the Draft, the ECW brand was left without a world championship, after the ECW Champion Kane was drafted to Raw. As a result of pre-draft stipulations, champions took their championships to their new brand and made them property of that brand. SmackDown, however, lost their secondary championship, after United States Champion Matt Hardy was drafted to the ECW brand, in the process making the title ECW property, but gained another top-tier championship when WWE Champion Triple H was drafted to the SmackDown brand, in the process making the title SmackDown exclusive for the first time since 2005. The result of Triple H being drafted was the loss of the Raw brand's world championship. After the draft, the ECW Championship moved back to ECW when Mark Henry defeated Kane and Big Show in a Triple Threat match at Night of Champions, leaving Raw without any top-tier championships. On the June 30, 2008 episode of Raw, the Raw brand regained a world championship, after Money in the Bank contract holder, CM Punk, cashed in his contract and defeated the World Heavyweight Champion, Edge. Lastly, the United States Championship returned to SmackDown after Shelton Benjamin defeated Matt Hardy at The Great American Bash pay-per-view on July 20. Trevor Murdoch and Big Daddy V were both later released from WWE prior to their first appearances on SmackDown after being drafted. Chuck Palumbo was also later released from the WWE prior to his first appearance on Raw after being drafted. Umaga died in 2009 from an accidental drug overdose, while Big Daddy V died in 2014 of heart failure.

The draft helped increased the television ratings of Raw, which was one of the main purposes of the draft. The television rating for the three hours was 3.40 TVR, as it earned 2.78 TVR for the first hour, 3.46 TVR for the second hour, and 3.95 TVR for the final hour. In its regular time slot, the show would have garnered a 3.7 rating. Both ratings were higher than the week's previous rating of a 3.3 TVR.

== See also ==
- List of WWE personnel
