= 2008 Draft =

The 2008 Draft may refer to:

- The 2008 AFL draft
- The 2008 NBA draft
- The 2008 NFL draft
- The 2008 NHL entry draft
- The 2008 WNBA draft
- The 2008 WWE draft
