= 2017 WWE Superstar Shake-up =

WWE's intra-brand draft

- Promotional poster for the 2017 WWE Superstar Shake-up featuring various WWE wrestlers from Raw and SmackDown

General information
- Sport: Professional wrestling
- Date(s): April 10–11, 2017
- Location: Uniondale, New York (April 10; Raw); Boston, Massachusetts (April 11; SmackDown)

Overview
- League: WWE
- Teams: Raw; SmackDown

The 2017 WWE Superstar Shake-up was the eleventh WWE draft – and the first to be rebranded as the Superstar Shake-up – produced by the American professional wrestling promotion WWE between the Raw and SmackDown brands. Instead of a traditional draft, changes between the brands were made behind the scenes, with moving wrestlers simply appearing on a brand's show or announced via WWE's website or social medias. It was a two-day event that took place on the April 10 and 11 episodes of Monday Night Raw and SmackDown Live, respectively, on the USA Network in the United States. Raw was broadcast from Uniondale, New York at the Nassau Veterans Memorial Coliseum, while SmackDown was broadcast from Boston, Massachusetts at TD Garden.

== Background ==
The WWE Draft is an annual process used by the American professional wrestling promotion WWE while a brand extension, or brand split, is in effect. The original brand extension occurred from 2002 to 2011. During a brand extension, the company divides its roster into brands where the wrestlers exclusively perform for each brand's respective television show, and the draft is used to refresh the rosters of the brand divisions, typically between the Raw and SmackDown brands.

In mid-2016, WWE reintroduced the brand extension, dividing their main roster between the Raw and SmackDown brands, represented by the shows of the same name, with a commissioner and a general manager appointed for each brand. During the 2016 WWE draft in July, the commissioners and general managers drafted wrestlers to compete exclusively on their respective brands. The following year on the April 3, 2017 episode of Monday Night Raw, WWE Chairman and chief executive officer Vince McMahon announced another draft. The 2017 draft was rebranded as the Superstar Shake-up and scheduled for the April 10 and April 11 episodes of Raw and SmackDown Live, respectively. For the 2017 Superstar Shake-up, instead of a traditional draft, the brands' commissioners and general managers made trades and other deals behind the scenes between their respective talent. During the 2016 draft, NXT wrestlers were eligible to be drafted, and although some NXT wrestlers debuted on Raw and SmackDown during the 2017 Shake-up, these were not considered part of the Shake-up.

== Selections ==
=== Raw ===
The following wrestlers and other personnel changed brands on the April 10 episode of Raw. The first and last two entries happened before and after the show, respectively.

Color at the top indicates the brand color of Raw as to Night 1 of the draft taking place on Raw separate from Night 2 of the draft taking place on SmackDown separate from the color blue that represents the brand SmackDown.

#	Brand (to)	Employee	Role	Brand (from)	Notes
1	Raw	Apollo Crews	Male wrestler	SmackDown	Announced prior to Raw via WWE's social media
2	Raw	The Miz and Maryse	Male wrestler and female manager	SmackDown	
3	Raw	Dean Ambrose	Male wrestler	SmackDown	Drafted with the Intercontinental Championship
4	Raw	Curt Hawkins	Male wrestler	SmackDown	
5	Raw	Bray Wyatt	Male wrestler	SmackDown	
6	Raw	Kalisto	Male wrestler	SmackDown	
7	Raw	Heath Slater and Rhyno	Tag team	SmackDown	
8	Raw	Alexa Bliss	Female wrestler	SmackDown	
9	Raw	Mickie James	Female wrestler	SmackDown	
10	SmackDown	Byron Saxton	Male commentator	Raw	Announced after Raw via WWE's social media. Traded for David Otunga
11	Raw	David Otunga	Male commentator	SmackDown	Announced after Raw via WWE's social media. Traded for Byron Saxton. At time of the Superstar Shake-up, Otunga was out filming a movie. His first appearance for the brand was during the Extreme Rules preshow.

=== SmackDown ===
The following wrestlers changed brands on the April 11 episode of SmackDown. The first entry happened before the show.

Color at the top indicates the brand color of SmackDown as to Night 2 of the draft taking place on SmackDown separate from Night 1 of the draft taking place on Raw separate from the color red that represents the brand Raw.

#	Brand (to)	Employee	Role	Brand (from)	Notes
1	SmackDown	Jinder Mahal	Male wrestler	Raw	Announced prior to SmackDown via WWE's social media
2	SmackDown	Kevin Owens	Male wrestler	Raw	Drafted with the United States Championship
3	SmackDown	Sami Zayn	Male wrestler	Raw	
4	SmackDown	The Shining Stars (Primo and Epico)	Tag team	Raw	Subsequently changed their tag team name to The Colóns.
5	SmackDown	Tamina	Female wrestler	Free agent	Tamina went undrafted in the 2016 WWE draft, as she was out due to an injury. The Superstar Shake-up was her first appearance on WWE television since before the 2016 draft
6	SmackDown	Charlotte Flair	Female wrestler	Raw	
7	SmackDown	Sin Cara	Male wrestler	Raw	
8	SmackDown	Rusev	Male wrestler	Raw	At time of the Superstar Shake-up, Rusev was out of action due to shoulder surgery. He made his return on the July 4 episode of SmackDown.
9	SmackDown	Lana	Female wrestler	Raw	Drafted separately from her husband Rusev under a new gimmick. Her first appearance for the brand was on the June 6 episode of SmackDown
10	SmackDown	The New Day (Big E, Kofi Kingston, and Xavier Woods)	Tag team	Raw	At the time of the Superstar Shake-up, Kingston was out of action. The New Day's first appearance for the brand was on the May 23 episode of Talking Smack.

Notes

- The only tag team/stable broken up as a direct result of the Superstar Shake-up was The Wyatt Family: Bray Wyatt moved to Raw while Erick Rowan remained on SmackDown.
- The Intercontinental Championship moved to Raw while the United States Championship moved to SmackDown. Prior to the Superstar Shake-up, United States Champion Kevin Owens was already scheduled to defend the title against Chris Jericho at the Raw-exclusive pay-per-view Payback on April 30, 2017. At Payback, Jericho defeated Owens for the title and transferred to the SmackDown brand. Payback also included a non-title match between SmackDown's WWE Champion Randy Orton and Bray Wyatt, who moved to Raw.
- On June 14, 2017, it was revealed that John Cena, who had been on hiatus since WrestleMania 33, became a free agent during the Superstar Shake-up. He returned on the July 4 episode of SmackDown, stating that he would appear for both brands.

== Reception ==
WWE had explained that the general managers of Raw and SmackDown could make trades and deals amongst their talent. Adam Silverstein of CBS Sports commented on this, stating that there was no explanation on who was traded for who or what deals were made. Instead, the performers just appeared on the show and declared that they were now part of that brand. Silverstein also commented on how there were matches that were scheduled for Payback, which was supposed to be a Raw-exclusive pay-per-view, but due to the shake-up, a couple of SmackDown wrestlers appeared there since their matches were scheduled prior to the shake-up. He said the feuds for those matches should have ended at WrestleMania 33. Silverstein said that WWE at least explained what would happen to the winner of the United States Championship match, something they did not do for the WWE Championship match. The reason for this was because Randy Orton and Bray Wyatt's match was a non-title match, which was not initially clear when the match was scheduled.

Brian Mazique of Forbes stated that the Superstar Shake-up felt like Major League Baseball's Winter Meetings, and that it added "much-needed freshness after WrestleMania." Mazique also expressed excitement over potential feuds, such as Bray Wyatt and Finn Bálor on Raw and AJ Styles and Kevin Owens on SmackDown. Josh Barnett of Sports Weekly stated that the fate of SmackDown's tag team division was now up to The New Day, as the division had been foundering for quite some time.

The April 10 episode of Raw garnered a rating of 2.35, which was down from the post-WrestleMania Raw of the previous week, which had a 2.62 rating. The April 10 broadcast averaged 3.429 million viewers, which was down from the 3.767 million average viewers of the previous week. The April 11 episode of SmackDown saw a rating of 2.14, which was up from 2.02 the previous week, and was SmackDown's highest rating since the brand split in July 2016. The April 11 broadcast had a total viewership of 3.1 million viewers.

== Aftermath ==
During and following the events of the Superstar Shake-up on Raw, Braun Strowman injured new Raw member Kalisto after he had lost to him in a dumpster match. In the women's division, new Raw members Alexa Bliss and Mickie James participated in a fatal four-way match, which Alexa won to become the number one contender for the Raw Women's Championship at Payback; she subsequently defeated Bayley at the event and became the first woman to win both the Raw and SmackDown women's championships. New Raw members The Miz and Intercontinental Champion Dean Ambrose reignited their old feud from SmackDown over the title. Apollo Crews joined with Titus O'Neil and later Akira Tozawa, Curt Hawkins continued his role as a jobber, but claimed that everyone who defeats him becomes a star. Bray Wyatt ended his feud with Randy Orton at Payback and began a feud with Seth Rollins. Also, Dash Wilder of The Revival, who debuted along with his tag team partner Scott Dawson on the April 3 episode of Raw, suffered a jaw injury, which took him out for several weeks. NXT's Elias Samson debuted on the April 10 episode of Raw and later shortened his ring name to Elias.

On SmackDown, AJ Styles defeated Baron Corbin and new SmackDown member Sami Zayn to become the number one contender for the United States Championship at Backlash. New SmackDown member Charlotte Flair became the number one contender for Naomi's SmackDown Women's Championship. Their title match ended in a no contest after both women were attacked by The Welcoming Committee (Natalya, Tamina, and Carmella with James Ellsworth); Charlotte subsequently turned face. The Shining Stars changed their ring name to The Colóns and had a short feud with American Alpha. Jinder Mahal continued his mini-feud with Mojo Rawley from WrestleMania 33 and subsequently defeated Randy Orton for the WWE Championship at Backlash; he received help from the NXT's The Bollywood Boyz (renamed to The Singh Brothers, Sunil and Samir, respectively), who were promoted to SmackDown. At Payback, Chris Jericho defeated Kevin Owens for the United States Championship, subsequently moving Jericho to SmackDown. The New Day challenged The Usos for the SmackDown Tag Team Championship at Money in the Bank. For several weeks, Lana was promoted as "coming soon" in vignettes showcasing her in a new gimmick. She made her first official appearance for the brand on the June 6 episode of SmackDown and challenged Naomi for the SmackDown Women's Championship at Money in the Bank. Her husband Rusev appeared in WWE.com videos and demanded a WWE Championship match at Money in the Bank, but did not appear until the July 4 episode of SmackDown, when he confronted the returning John Cena, setting up a flag match at Battleground.
