= World Heavyweight Championship (WWE, 2002–2013) =

Former men's professional wrestling championship

- The World Heavyweight Championship was represented by a design based on the Big Gold Belt that incorporated the WWE logo.

Details
- Promotion: WWE
- Date established: September 2, 2002
- Date retired: December 15, 2013 (unified with the WWE Championship)

Other names
- World Championship (2006, 2010) (Note: During Rey Mysterio's reigns in 2006 and 2010, the title was referred to as the World Championship due to Mysterio not being a heavyweight.); WWE World Heavyweight Championship (2013) (Note: The title was unified with WWE Championship; this lasted for one minute until it deactivated.)
Statistics
- First champion: Triple H
- Final champion: Randy Orton
- Most reigns: Edge (7 reigns)
- Longest reign: Batista (1st reign, 282 days) (Note: 281 days as recognized by WWE)
- Shortest reign: Randy Orton (4th reign, 1 minute) (Note: WWE recognizes Orton's final reign—and the championship's subsequent unification with the WWE Championship—as lasting for one minute.)
- Oldest champion: The Undertaker (44 years, 194 days)
- Youngest champion: Randy Orton (24 years, 136 days)
- Heaviest champion: Big Show (441 lb (200 kg))
- Lightest champion: Rey Mysterio (175 lb (79 kg))

The 2002 to 2013 version of the World Heavyweight Championship was a men's professional wrestling world heavyweight championship created and promoted by the American promotion WWE. It was the second world championship to be created by the company, after their original world title, the WWE Championship (1963), but third used by the company, including the WCW Championship (2001). The title was one of two top championships in the company from 2002 to 2006 and from 2010 to 2013, complementing the WWE Championship, and one of three top championships from 2006 to 2010 with the addition of the ECW Championship.

Established in September 2002, its creation came as a result of the WWE Undisputed Championship becoming exclusive to the SmackDown brand which left Raw without a world title due to the introduction of the brand split. Raw then created the World Heavyweight Championship and the title was awarded to Triple H. The titles moved between the WWE brands on different occasions (usually as a result of the WWE Draft) until August 29, 2011, when all programming became full roster "supershows".

The World Heavyweight Championship was retired at TLC: Tables, Ladders & Chairs on December 15, 2013, when it was unified with the WWE Championship with Randy Orton recognized as the final champion. The title was one of five to be represented by the historic Big Gold Belt, introduced in 1986. Its heritage can be traced back to the original version of the World Heavyweight Wrestling Championship, which was the first recognized world championship, thereby giving the belt a legacy over 100 years old, the oldest in the world.

== History ==
=== Background ===
The title's origins lay in the first world heavyweight championship, and then to events that began in the National Wrestling Alliance (NWA), which had many different territorial professional wrestling promotions as members. In the late 1980s, World Championship Wrestling (WCW) was a member of the NWA, having been formed by the purchase of Jim Crockett Promotions (JCP), which had absorbed many other NWA members, by Turner Broadcasting, which aired WCW's programming. During this time, WCW used the NWA World Heavyweight Championship as its world title. The WCW World Heavyweight Championship was soon established when the recognition was awarded to then-NWA World Heavyweight Champion Ric Flair in 1991. In 1993, WCW seceded from the NWA and grew to become a rival promotion to the World Wrestling Federation (WWF), itself a former member of the NWA. Both organizations grew into mainstream prominence and were eventually involved in the Nielsen ratings war dubbed "the Monday Night War". Near the end of the ratings war, WCW began a financial decline, which culminated in March 2001 with the WWF's purchase of selected assets of WCW.

As a result of the purchase, the WWF acquired the video library of WCW, select talent contracts, and championships, among other assets. The slew of former WCW talent joining the WWF roster began "The Invasion" that effectively phased out the WCW name with the establishment of The Alliance. Following this, the renamed WCW World Championship was unified with the WWF Championship, the WWF's world title, at Vengeance on December 9, 2001. At the event, the WCW World Championship was decommissioned with Chris Jericho becoming the final WCW World Champion and the subsequent Undisputed WWF Championship after respectively defeating The Rock and Stone Steve Austin. The WWF title became the undisputed championship in professional wrestling until September 2002 with the creation of the World Heavyweight Championship, spun off from the Undisputed WWE Championship as the successor to the WCW World Championship.

=== Creation ===
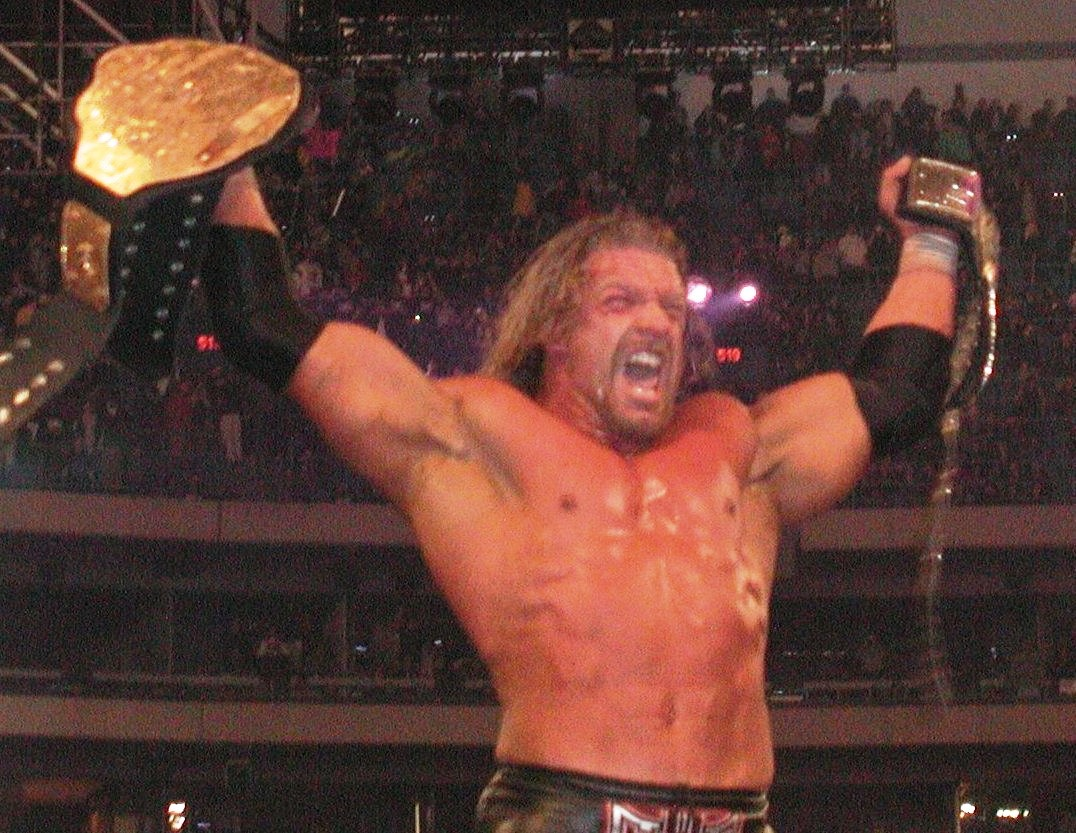
Inaugural and five-time World Heavyweight Champion Triple H

By 2002, WWE's roster had doubled in size due to the overabundance of contracted workers. As a result of the increase, WWE divided the roster through its two main television programs, Raw and SmackDown!, assigning championships and appointing figureheads to each brand of the same name. This expansion became known as the "Brand Extension". In May 2002, the WWF was renamed to World Wrestling Entertainment (WWE). Following these changes, the Undisputed WWE Championship remained unaffiliated with either brand as competitors from both brands could challenge the Undisputed Champion. Following the appointment of Eric Bischoff and Stephanie McMahon as General Managers of the Raw and SmackDown brands, respectively, McMahon contracted then-WWE Undisputed Champion Brock Lesnar to the SmackDown brand, leaving the Raw brand without a world title. On September 2, Bischoff announced the creation of the World Heavyweight Championship. Bischoff awarded the title to Triple H, who had been designated number-one contender to Lesnar's title the previous week. Immediately afterwards, the Undisputed WWE Championship returned to being the WWE Championship as it was no longer undisputed. The World Heavyweight Championship and the WWE Championship switched brands a number of times before the first brand split ended in 2011.

=== Historical lineage ===
A diagram showing the evolution of various world heavyweight championships

While introduced in 2002 as a new title, the WWE often made allusions to other titles including those of WCW and the NWA, amalgamating the history of the championship with the history of the Big Gold Belt that represents it. As affirmed by WWE, the World Heavyweight Championship is not a continuation of the WCW World Championship, amd is rather its successor by way of the WWE Undisputed Championship, just as the WCW World Championship spun off from the NWA World Heavyweight Championship. Due to its relation to both titles, its lineage is connected with the earliest recognized world heavyweight championship. In 2009, WWE released a DVD set called History of the World Heavyweight Championship that definitively linked the title to the WCW and NWA titles.

=== Title unification ===
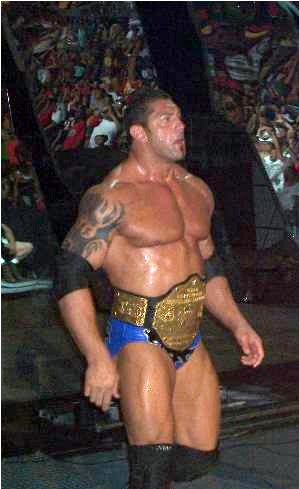
Four-time and longest-reigning champion Batista

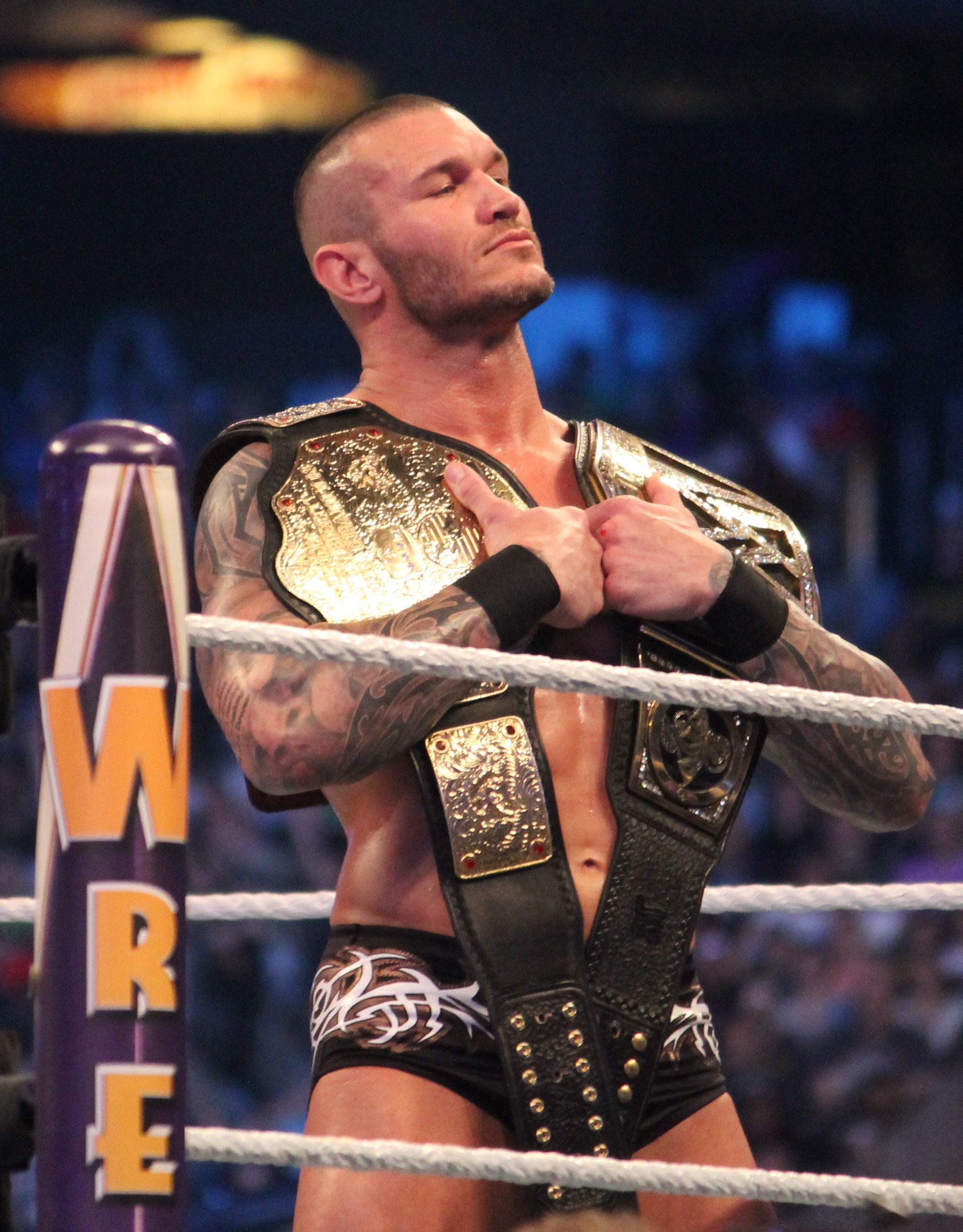
Youngest, four-time, and final champion Randy Orton, pictured here holding the Big Gold Belt (formerly representing the World Heavyweight Championship), and the 2013–2014 belt design of the WWE Championship; both belts together represented the renamed WWE World Heavyweight Championship until a single belt was introduced in August 2014.

Following the end of the first brand extension in 2011, both the World Heavyweight Champion and WWE Champion could appear on both Raw and SmackDown. On November 25, 2013, the night after Survivor Series, then-World Heavyweight Champion John Cena made a challenge to then-WWE Champion Randy Orton to determine an undisputed WWE world champion. Randy Orton defeated John Cena in a TLC match at the TLC: Tables, Ladders & Chairs pay-per-view on December 15 to unify the titles. Subsequently, the WWE Championship was renamed WWE World Heavyweight Championship. The unified championship retained the lineage of the WWE Championship and the World Heavyweight Championship was retired.

With his victory over Cena, Orton had become the final World Heavyweight Champion. Like with the Undisputed WWF/WWE Championship, the Big Gold Belt was used in tandem with the WWE Championship belt to represent the WWE World Heavyweight Championship until a single belt was presented to then champion Brock Lesnar in August 2014. In July 2016, with the return of the brand extension and the 2016 WWE Draft, the WWE Universal Championship was created as a new world championship, with no lineage to the World Heavyweight Championship.

=== New World Heavyweight Championship ===
On the April 24, 2023, episode of Raw, WWE Chief Content Officer Triple H unveiled a new World Heavyweight Championship with a belt design that pays homage to the Big Gold Belt and announced that the inaugural champion would be crowned at Night of Champions on May 27. Despite having the same name, this newer title does not carry the lineage of the 2002 to 2013 version but is considered his direct successor. On August 2, 2025, in the main event of Night 1 of SummerSlam, CM Punk defeated Gunther to win the newer World Heavyweight Championship. In the process, Punk became the first wrestler to win the 2002 and the 2023 versions of the World Heavyweight Championship.

== Brand designation history ==
Originally introduced on the Raw brand, the World Heavyweight Championship switched back and forth between WWE's two main brands.

Date of transition	Brand	Notes
September 2, 2002	Raw	The World Heavyweight Championship was established for Raw and awarded to Triple H, who was the previously designated number-one contender for the WWE Undisputed Championship before it became exclusive to SmackDown and renamed to WWE Championship.
June 30, 2005	SmackDown	World Heavyweight Champion Batista was drafted to SmackDown during the 2005 WWE Draft Lottery.
June 30, 2008	Raw	The World Heavyweight Championship moved to Raw after CM Punk, a member of the Raw brand, cashed in his Money in the Bank contract and defeated Edge to win the World Heavyweight Championship.
February 15, 2009	SmackDown	The World Heavyweight Championship moved to SmackDown after Edge, a member of the SmackDown brand, won the World Heavyweight Championship in an Elimination Chamber match at No Way Out.
April 5, 2009	Raw	The World Heavyweight Championship returned to Raw after John Cena, a member of the Raw brand, defeated Edge and Big Show in a triple threat match at WrestleMania 25 to win the World Heavyweight Championship.
April 26, 2009	SmackDown	The World Heavyweight Championship moved back to SmackDown after Edge, a member of the SmackDown brand, defeated John Cena in a Last Man Standing match at Backlash to win the World Heavyweight Championship.
August 29, 2011	N/A	In August 2011, the brand extension was ended. The World Heavyweight Champion could appear on both Raw and SmackDown. After two years, the title was retired at TLC: Tables, Ladders & Chairs in December 2013 as it was unified into the WWE Championship, which subsequently became known as the WWE World Heavyweight Championship.

== Reigns ==
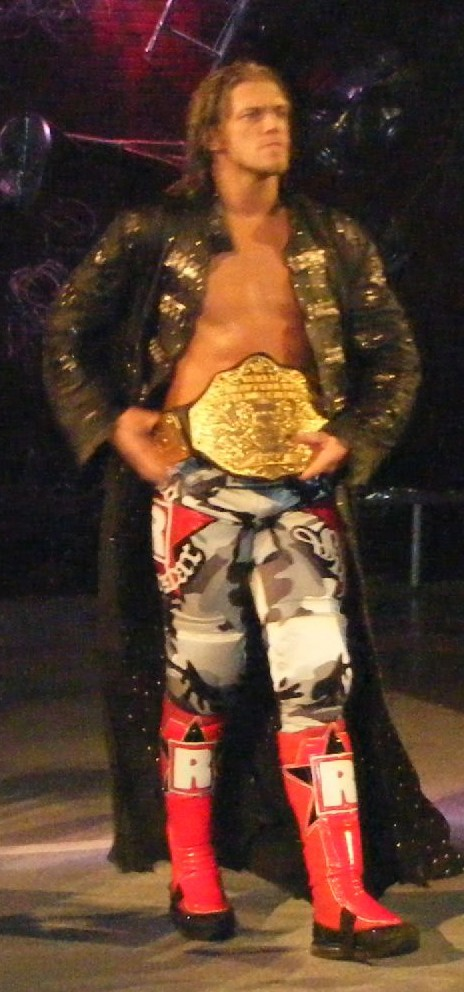
Record seven-time champion Edge

The inaugural champion was Triple H, and there were 25 different champions overall. Batista was the longest reigning champion in his first reign, holding the championship for 282 days. Triple H holds the record for longest combined reigns at 616 days over 5 reigns. Randy Orton was the shortest reigning champion in his fourth and final reign, immediately retiring the championship upon winning and unifying it with the WWE Championship. He was also the youngest champion, when he won the title for the first time at the age of 24 in 2004. The oldest champion was The Undertaker, who won the title for the third and final time at the age of 44 in 2009.

Edge holds the record for most reigns, with seven championship wins between 2007 and 2011. There were six vacancies throughout the title's history. Orton was the final champion in his fourth reign. He defeated John Cena in a TLC match at TLC: Tables, Ladders & Chairs in Houston, Texas, on December 15 to unify the WWE Championship and the World Heavyweight Championship into the WWE World Heavyweight Championship.

== Notes ==
Sporting positions
Preceded by WCW World Heavyweight Championship	WWE's top world championship 2002–2013	Succeeded by World Heavyweight Championship
