= 2006 WWE brand extension draft =

WWE's intra-brand draft

2006 WWE draft
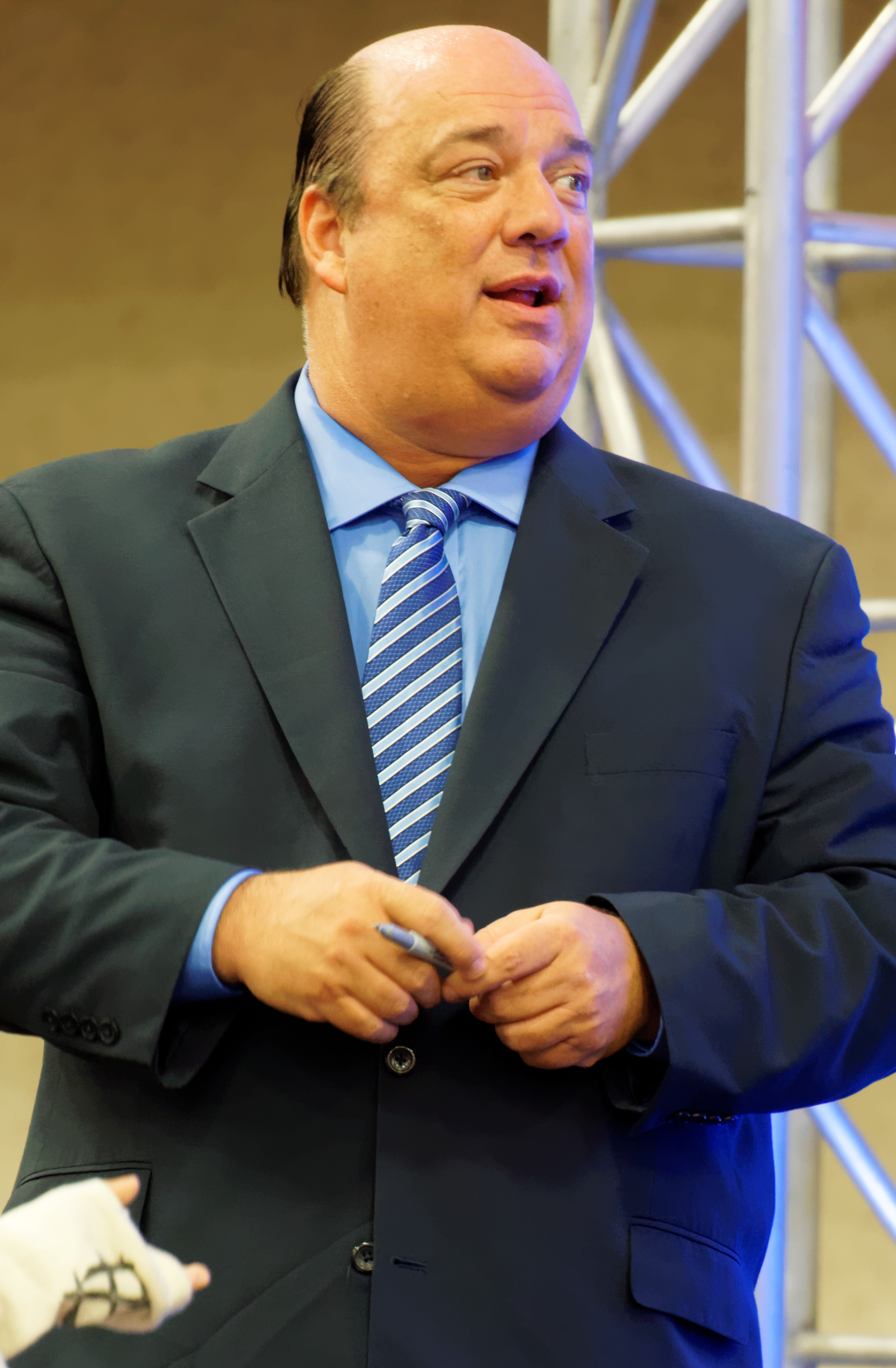
- Paul Heyman represented ECW during the 2006 WWE draft.

General information
- Sport: Professional wrestling
- Date: May 29, 2006
- Location: Tacoma, Washington

Overview
- League: World Wrestling Entertainment
- Teams: ECW; Raw (outgoing only); SmackDown! (outgoing only)

The 2006 World Wrestling Entertainment (WWE) brand extension draft, also known as the 2006 ECW draft, was the fourth WWE draft that took place at the Tacoma Dome in Tacoma, Washington, on May 29. The draft aired on WWE's flagship program Raw. The draft featured former Extreme Championship Wrestling (ECW) owner Paul Heyman receiving two total draft picks from the existing SmackDown! and Raw rosters for the newly created ECW brand.

== Background ==
After World Wrestling Entertainment, Inc. bought all the assets of Extreme Championship Wrestling (ECW) from its parent HHG Corporation in 2003, the company began releasing DVDs promoting the original ECW. Soon afterwards, the company promoted shows for ECW alumni entitled, One Night Stand in 2005 and in 2006. On May 25, 2006, WWE announced the launch of a new brand, ECW, a revival of original promotion. The new brand would later debut its television show on the Sci Fi Channel on June 13, 2006. In preparation for the launch of the new ECW television show, ECW representative Paul Heyman would receive two draft picks from the existing Raw and SmackDown! rosters.

== Selections ==
Pick No.	Brand (to)	Employee	Role	Brand (from)
1	ECW	Rob Van Dam	Male wrestler	Raw
2	ECW	Kurt Angle	Male wrestler	SmackDown!

== Aftermath ==
Fifteen days after the draft ECW would hold its premiere episode on June 13, 2006. Although not drafted, Tazz later defected from SmackDown! to ECW, Big Show from Raw to ECW, and Randy Orton from SmackDown! to Raw. In August 2006, after a few appearances, Kurt Angle requested and was granted his release from his WWE contract.

On February 2, 2010, WWE Chairman Vince McMahon announced that ECW would air its final episode on February 16, 2010. The ECW brand was disbanded after the final show, with every ECW wrestler becoming a free agent, eligible to join either the Raw or SmackDown brands. The original brand extension would end in August 2011.
