= WWE Draft =

Professional wrestling roster selection process

The WWE Draft logo used from October 2019 to April 2023

The WWE Draft is a process used by the American professional wrestling promotion WWE to refresh its rosters between the Raw and SmackDown brands (2002–2011; 2016–present) when a brand extension is in effect. Wrestlers from the promotion's developmental brand NXT (2016–present) are also eligible to be drafted to Raw and SmackDown. Two of WWE's former brands, ECW (2006–2009) and 205 Live (2019), have also taken part in the draft during the promotion's various brand split periods.

The draft was first used in 2002 when the then-World Wrestling Federation (WWF) introduced the brand split. It was initially called the WWF Draft Lottery but after the company's renaming from WWF to WWE two months after that original draft, it was rebranded the following year to WWE Draft Lottery (2004–2005), then WWE Brand Extension Draft (2006), and then simply WWE Draft (2007–2011). In 2011, WWE ended the original brand split.

With SmackDown moving to Tuesdays and to a live broadcast starting July 19, 2016, WWE reintroduced the brand split with a draft held that same episode. From 2017 until May 2019, the draft was rebranded as the Superstar Shake-up; instead of a traditional draft, wrestlers were traded or moved between the brands with decisions made behind the scenes. With SmackDown's move to Friday nights on FOX beginning October 4, 2019, a second draft for the year was scheduled to occur, reverting to its original name ("WWE Draft") and returning to a traditional draft format. A draft was not held in 2022, but it returned in 2023.

== History ==
=== Initial brand split ===
In 2002, the then-World Wrestling Federation (WWF, now WWE) introduced the brand extension, splitting its roster into two "brands", Raw and SmackDown, represented by the shows of the same name where their talent would exclusively perform. Only then Undisputed Champion Triple H and Women's Champion Jazz were ineligible to be drafted, as the holders of those titles defended them on both brands; the other champions, however, could be drafted.

The first half of the 2002 draft was televised live on TNN for two hours, as part of the WWF's flagship program, Monday Night Raw. The second half was conducted over the Internet on the WWF's website. There were thirty draft picks, with sixty wrestlers drafted overall by co-owners of the WWF, onto their respective brands, Raw and SmackDown. The remaining wrestlers were divided randomly in a draft lottery, with each brand receiving a grand total of thirty wrestlers. During the draft, Raw drafted Intercontinental Champion Rob Van Dam and European Champion William Regal, while SmackDown drafted Tag Team Champions Billy and Chuck, Cruiserweight Champion Tajiri, and Hardcore Champion Maven, though the Tag Team Championship, renamed to World Tag Team Championship, and Hardcore Championship switched to Raw after the titles were won by Raw's The Un-Americans (Christian and Lance Storm) and Raven, respectively. Two months after the draft, the WWF was renamed to World Wrestling Entertainment (WWE). In July and August, respectively, the European and Hardcore titles were unified into the Intercontinental title. In September, the Undisputed Championship became exclusive to SmackDown and renamed to WWE Championship after reigning champion Brock Lesnar signed an exclusive deal with the brand. In response, Raw established the World Heavyweight Championship as the counterpart to the WWE Championship. The Women's Championship also became exclusive to Raw with no SmackDown counterpart. SmackDown then established the WWE Tag Team Championship as the counterpart to the World Tag Team Championship, and in July 2003, they revived the United States Championship as the counterpart to the Intercontinental title.

The second draft took place in 2004 on Raw on Spike TV. Post-draft trades were revealed on WWE's website until midnight on March 22, 2004. There were twelve draft picks, with nineteen wrestlers overall switching between the promotion's two brands. During the draft lottery, the General manager of Raw, Eric Bischoff, and the General manager of SmackDown!, Paul Heyman, stood on opposite ends of the stage on the Raw set, where they drafted six wrestlers randomly via two machines. At the conclusion of the draft, the two GMs would then be allowed to trade anyone on the roster until Midnight EST, which was later extended until Tuesday night after Heyman resigned. Every on-screen WWE employee was eligible to be drafted, including injured wrestlers, commentators, champions, and general managers.

The 2005 draft took place on WWE's two television programs, Raw, which aired on Spike TV, and SmackDown!, which aired on UPN. Post-draft trades were announced on WWE's website. The draft picks were made each Monday on Raw and each Thursday on SmackDown! from June 6 to June 30. Each pick was drafted at random. Like the previous year, all on-screen WWE personnel were eligible to be drafted. There were ten draft picks and an eleven-person trade conducted between the promotion's two brands; twenty-two wrestlers were drafted and traded overall. During the draft, WWE Champion John Cena was drafted to Raw and kept his championship. General Manager Theodore Long considered creating a new SmackDown world championship but the idea was abandoned when World Heavyweight Champion Batista was drafted to SmackDown, bringing the title with him.

=== Addition of ECW ===
There was no Raw and SmackDown draft in 2006, however, ECW became a third brand. ECW representative Paul Heyman received two total draft picks from the existing SmackDown and Raw rosters for the newly created ECW brand, which shortly after revived the ECW World Heavyweight Championship as the brand's only title.

The first half of the 2007 draft was televised live on Raw on USA Network, while the second half, the supplemental draft, was conducted on June 17, 2007, on WWE's website for four hours as draft picks were revealed at twenty-minute intervals. There were twenty-three draft picks, with twenty-seven wrestlers drafted overall, between the promotion's three brands: Raw, SmackDown, and ECW. For the televised half of the draft, each brand's draft pick was determined by nine matches, one being a battle royal for two draft picks, where wrestlers from their respective brands wrestled to earn a draft pick. The supplemental draft, however, was conducted randomly, with each brand receiving random draft selections. Raw and SmackDown! received five random draft picks, while ECW received three random draft picks. The televised draft picks were randomly selected by a computer that was shown on the Raw titantron. Every WWE wrestler from Raw, SmackDown!, and ECW was eligible to be drafted. ECW World Champion Bobby Lashley was stripped of the title after being drafted to Raw. The Cruiserweight Championship was also retired later that year.

During the 2008 draft, broadcast live on Raw, United States Champion Matt Hardy was drafted to ECW, while WWE Champion Triple H was drafted to SmackDown, and ECW Champion Kane was drafted to Raw. The World Heavyweight Championship moved to Raw after Raw's CM Punk cashed in his Money in the Bank contract and defeated Edge to win the title on an episode of Raw, the ECW Championship moved back to ECW after ECW's Mark Henry won the title at Night of Champions, and the United States Championship moved back to SmackDown after SmackDown's Shelton Benjamin defeated Hardy to win the title. Every on-screen WWE employee was eligible to be drafted. Similar to the 2007 draft, wrestlers from each brand competed in matches to win a random draft pick for their brand. Draft picks were kayfabe selected at random via a computer that was shown on the titantron. Like the previous year, a supplemental draft took place on June 25, in which draft selections were randomly conducted. Also in 2008, SmackDown established the WWE Divas Championship as the counterpart to the Women's Championship on Raw.

The 2009 draft took place over two days: the first day was televised live on the April 13 episode of Raw from Atlanta, Georgia, while the supplemental draft was held on April 13 on WWE's website. Wrestlers, general managers, and commentators were all eligible to be drafted from the company's roster. For the televised half, matches determined which brand received a random draft selection. During the supplemental draft, brand and employee selections were made at random. Overall, 36 draft selections were made. Twelve selections were made on television, six by Raw, five by SmackDown, and one by ECW. All of the draftees were wrestlers: 28 males (10 drafted on television) and 8 females (2 drafted on television). Just prior to the 2009 draft at WrestleMania XXV, The Colóns (Carlito and Primo) unified the World Tag Team and WWE Tag Team Championships as the Unified WWE Tag Team Championship, though the titles remained independently active. Unified WWE Tag Team Champions The Colóns, Divas Champion Maryse, United States Champion MVP, and WWE Champion Triple H were drafted to Raw, while Women's Champion Melina and Intercontinental Champion Rey Mysterio were drafted to SmackDown. The World Heavyweight Championship moved to SmackDown after SmackDown's Edge defeated John Cena for the title at Backlash.

=== Disbanding of ECW and the brand split ===
The 2010 draft took place over two days: the first day was televised live on April 26 on Raw at Richmond Coliseum in Richmond, Virginia, and the second part, the supplemental draft, was held on April 27 on WWE's website. As the ECW brand had been disbanded two months earlier, deactivating the ECW Championship along with it, the draft was once again only between Raw and SmackDown. Unified WWE Tag Team Champions The Hart Dynasty (Tyson Kidd and David Hart Smith) were drafted to Raw. Later that year, the World Tag Team Championship was formally decommissioned in favor of continuing the WWE Tag Team Championship, which dropped "Unified" from its name, and the Women's and Divas Championships were unified, retiring the Women's title and continuing the Divas title, which briefly became known as the Unified WWE Divas Championship. The WWE Tag Team Championship and Divas Championship both became unbranded, allowing the holders to defend the titles on both shows.

During the 2011 draft, United States Champion Sheamus was drafted to SmackDown, however, he lost to the title to Raw's Kofi Kingston the following month, moving the title back to Raw. The draft aired live on Raw, for two hours in Raleigh, North Carolina from the RBC Center. As a standard for previous drafts, most on-air personnel were eligible to be drafted. A continuation of the draft took place on WWE's official website at 12:00pm Eastern Time on the following afternoon. SmackDown received 16 additional members to its roster while Raw received 13. For the first time in draft history, two of the draft picks consisted of the same wrestler (John Cena) being selected to SmackDown with the first pick and back to Raw with the last televised pick. This was the last draft of the first brand split as WWE ended the brand split in August 2011, with all on-screen personnel appearing on both shows. Also, earlier in April that year, WWE ceased using its full name with the "WWE" abbreviation becoming an orphaned initialism.

In early 2012, WWE established a developmental brand called NXT with its own set of championships. The following year in December, the WWE Championship and World Heavyweight Championship were unified, retiring the World Heavyweight Championship and continuing the WWE Championship, which became known as the WWE World Heavyweight Championship until mid-2016, when it was renamed back to WWE Championship. The Divas Championship was also retired in early 2016 and replaced by a new WWE Women's Championship.

=== Second brand split ===
With the return of the brand split in 2016, the draft was reintroduced and occurred on July 19 on SmackDown Live – the live premiere of SmackDown, which was previously taped (also the debut of SmackDown on the USA Network). With the exception of NXT champions, wrestlers from the NXT brand were eligible to be drafted, as well as on-screen WWE employees. Tag teams counted as one pick unless a brand specifically only wanted a single member of the team. For every two draft picks by SmackDown, Raw received three (due to Raw being a three-hour show while SmackDown was only two hours). SmackDown drafted WWE Champion Dean Ambrose and Intercontinental Champion The Miz (along with his wife Maryse), while Raw drafted WWE Women's Champion Charlotte, United States Champion Rusev (along with his wife Lana), and WWE Tag Team Champions The New Day (Big E, Kofi Kingston, and Xavier Woods), among others. New titles were introduced. Raw established the WWE Universal Championship to be the counterpart to the WWE Championship. The WWE Women's Championship and WWE Tag Team Championship were renamed to Raw Women's Championship and Raw Tag Team Championship, respectively, while SmackDown introduced the SmackDown Women's Championship and SmackDown Tag Team Championship as counterparts. A new WWE Cruiserweight Championship was later introduced for the revived cruiserweight division on Raw.

In the following years, the draft was revamped as the Superstar Shake-up, in which changes between the brands were made behind the scenes, with moving wrestlers simply appearing on a brand's show or announced via WWE's website or social medias. The 2017 Superstar Shake-up occurred on the April 10 and 11 episodes of Raw and SmackDown, respectively. Raw drafted Intercontinental Champion Dean Ambrose and SmackDown drafted United States Champion Kevin Owens; Owens then lost the title to Raw's Chris Jericho, but instead of the title switching brands, Jericho moved to SmackDown. On-screen WWE employees were eligible to be drafted. Although wrestlers from NXT debuted on Raw and SmackDown during the 2017 Shake-up, these were not considered part of the Shake-up.

The 2018 Superstar Shake-up occurred on the April 16 and 17 episodes of Raw and SmackDown, respectively. The United States Championship switched brands twice. On the April 16 episode of Raw, reigning champion Jinder Mahal moved to the Raw brand and lost the title to Jeff Hardy that same night, who then took the title back to SmackDown as he moved to that brand the following night on SmackDown. NXT wrestlers were also eligible to be drafted. Shortly after the 2018 Shake-up, 205 Live became its own separate brand from Raw and the Cruiserweight Championship became exclusive to 205 Live. NXT UK also became a brand later that year with its own set of championships. The WWE Women's Tag Team Championship was later established and shared between the Raw, SmackDown, and NXT brands.

The 2019 Superstar Shake-up began on the April 15 and 16 episodes of Raw and SmackDown, respectively, with more draft moves confirmed over the next few weeks. SmackDown drafted Intercontinental Champion Finn Bálor while Raw drafted United States Champion Samoa Joe. NXT wrestlers were also eligible to be drafted and for the first time, wrestlers from the 205 Live brand were eligible. Reigning NXT Tag Team Champions The Viking Raiders (Ivar and Erik) were drafted to Raw, but the titles remained part of NXT; they subsequently relinquished the titles. Although not officially part of the 2019 Shake-up, Alexander Wolfe moved from SmackDown to NXT UK after his stable, Sanity, disbanded when stable leader Eric Young moved from SmackDown to Raw, while Tyler Breeze moved from Raw to NXT. A "Wild Card Rule" was introduced shortly after the Shake-up, allowing up to four wrestlers to appear on the opposing brand's show by invitation for one night only with unsanctioned appearances penalized with a fine or termination. However, the rule's stipulations were not enforced, making brand division between wrestlers unclear. Also introduced was a new championship, the WWE 24/7 Championship; shared across all of WWE's brands and open to anyone. The WWE Cruiserweight Championship also became shared with NXT and renamed to NXT Cruiserweight Championship.

With SmackDown's move to Friday nights on Fox in October 2019 – and the show once again renamed to Friday Night SmackDown – a second draft for 2019 was scheduled to definitively split the main roster between the Raw and SmackDown brands. Returning to its original name (the WWE Draft) and a traditional draft format, the 2019 draft occurred on the October 11 and 14 episodes of SmackDown and Raw, respectively. Personalities from Fox and USA Network appeared and were presented as having an influence over WWE's drafting decisions (the first time that the brand's television networks had an influence). Several celebrities from both networks also appeared. Over 70 wrestlers from the Raw, SmackDown, 205 Live, and NXT rosters, as well as tag teams, were eligible to be drafted to Raw or SmackDown, including all champions (although the 24/7 Champion and Women's Tag Team Champions were eligible to be drafted, they still defend their respective titles across the brands). Just like the 2016 draft, tag teams counted as one pick unless a brand specifically only wanted a single member of the team, and for every two draft picks made by SmackDown, Raw received three (as Raw is three hours and SmackDown is two). Most draft picks were announced on the live broadcasts of SmackDown and Raw, while supplemental picks were announced afterwards via WWE's website. Wrestlers who were not drafted to either brand became free agents and could sign with the brand of their choosing. Raw made 38 picks, while SmackDown made 30. The Wild Card Rule also ended with this draft. While no championships switched brands during the draft, the Universal Championship was moved to SmackDown later that same month after "The Fiend" Bray Wyatt, a SmackDown wrestler, defeated Seth Rollins for the title at Crown Jewel. The WWE Championship was then moved to Raw as reigning champion Brock Lesnar quit SmackDown to go to Raw to continue a feud with Rey Mysterio. Just prior to the draft, NXT became WWE's third major brand, though did not directly participate in the draft. The NXT Cruiserweight Championship also became shared with NXT UK. In May 2020, WWE initiated the Brand-to-Brand Invitation, allowing wrestlers to appear and wrestle on an opposing brand four times a year, or once every quarter. Although somewhat similar to the abolished Wild Card Rule, the rules of the Brand-to-Brand Invitation were followed more strictly.

The 2020 draft occurred on the October 9 and 12 episodes of SmackDown and Raw, respectively, between the Raw and SmackDown brands. The rules were the same as the previous draft. During a media call for NXT TakeOver XXX on August 19, Triple H had said that this draft would also involve the NXT brand, but the official announcement that occurred during the Clash of Champions pay-per-view on September 27 stated that this draft would only be between Raw and SmackDown. NXT later established their own women's tag team championship, the NXT Women's Tag Team Championship, thus the WWE Women's Tag Team Championship became only available to Raw and SmackDown.

The 2021 draft was held during the October 1 and 4 episodes of SmackDown and Raw, respectively, between the Raw and SmackDown brands. The rules were mostly the same as the previous two drafts, with the exception that both brands received two picks each round instead of Raw making three and SmackDown only making two. Additionally, wrestlers from NXT were eligible to be drafted to either Raw or SmackDown. Unlike previous drafts, the results did not immediately go into effect and instead became effective beginning with the October 22 episode of SmackDown, the day after the Crown Jewel pay-per-view.

A draft was not held in 2022 and brand division became increasingly unclear. At WrestleMania 38 in 2022, Roman Reigns won both the WWE Championship and Universal Championship, allowing him to appear on both brands as the Undisputed WWE Universal Champion, although both titles retained their individual lineages. Similarly, the Raw and SmackDown tag team titles became the Undisputed WWE Tag Team Championship in May 2022, but also retaining their individual lineages. These undisputed titles allowed all members of The Bloodline stable to appear on both brands, which extended to other wrestlers who became involved in their storylines, and even some who were not. The 24/7 Championship was also retired in November 2022. Also in 2022, both the 205 Live and NXT UK brands were disbanded (although NXT UK is planned for a relaunch as NXT Europe in 2024), with their championships retired, except the NXT UK Heritage Cup, which was transferred to NXT and renamed NXT Heritage Cup.

On the April 7, 2023, episode of SmackDown, with unclear roster division, WWE executive Triple H announced the 2023 draft. It was scheduled for the April 28 and May 1 episodes of SmackDown and Raw, respectively, with draft results taking effect beginning with the May 8 episode of Raw, two days after the Backlash pay-per-view and livestreaming event. This subsequently repositioned the draft back in its traditional post-WrestleMania slot. Triple H revealed that every WWE wrestler from Raw and SmackDown would be eligible to be drafted, with select wrestlers from NXT also eligible. While the Undisputed WWE Tag Team Championship continued to be shared between both brands, a new World Heavyweight Championship was introduced for the brand that did not draft Roman Reigns, who kept his Undisputed WWE Universal Championship. SmackDown drafted Reigns, thus the World Heavyweight Championship became exclusive to Raw. Additionally, the mid-card titles switched brands as Raw drafted Intercontinental Champion Gunther while SmackDown drafted United States Champion Austin Theory. SmackDown also drafted NXT Women's Tag Team Champions Isla Dawn and Alba Fyre, while Raw drafted NXT Women's Champion Indi Hartwell; Hartwell relinquished her title while Dawn and Fyre's title was unified into the WWE Women's Tag Team Championship in June, which made the latter available to NXT again. The Raw and SmackDown women's championships also switched brands, as Raw Women's Champion Bianca Belair was drafted to SmackDown and SmackDown Women's Champion Rhea Ripley was drafted to Raw. This issue was resolved in June as the Raw title reverted to its original name of WWE Women's Championship while the SmackDown title was renamed as the Women's World Championship. Draft selections on both nights were announced by various WWE Hall of Famers, including Triple H. Most draft selections were made on the shows, while supplemental picks were announced on the post-shows, SmackDown LowDown and Raw Talk, respectively. Unlike previous drafts in which free agents could sign with the brand of their choosing, wrestlers declared free agents in the 2023 draft could appear on any brand, though they were later assigned to specific brands. This designation of free agency was previously only reserved for part-time performers like John Cena and Brock Lesnar. At WrestleMania XL Night 1 on April 6, 2024, the Undisputed WWE Tag Team Championship was split, with Raw's tag title subsequently renamed as World Tag Team Championship while the SmackDown title was renamed as WWE Tag Team Championship.

The 2024 draft was scheduled for the April 26 and 29 episodes of SmackDown and Raw, respectively. Like previous drafts, select wrestlers from NXT were eligible to be drafted to Raw and SmackDown. However, unlike previous drafts, the champions of Raw and SmackDown were ineligible to be drafted, thus remaining on their respective brands, with the exception of the holders of the WWE Women's Tag Team Championship. While that title is available to all three brands, the reigning champions were eligible to be drafted as the brand they were drafted to is where they would be assigned upon loss of the title. Draft selections on both nights were announced by various WWE Hall of Famers and veterans, including Triple H. Most draft selections were made on the shows, while supplemental picks were announced on WWE's social media platforms after the broadcasts. Draft results went into effect beginning with the May 6 episode of Raw, two days after the Backlash France pay-per-view and livestreaming event.

== Drafts ==
No.	Year	Date(s)	Brands
1	2002	March 25	Raw; SmackDown
2	2004	March 22	Raw; SmackDown
3	2005	June 6–30	Raw; SmackDown
4	2006	May 29	ECW; Raw (outgoing only); SmackDown (outgoing only)
5	2007	June 11	Raw; SmackDown; ECW
6	2008	June 23	Raw; SmackDown; ECW
7	2009	April 13	Raw; SmackDown; ECW
8	2010	April 26	Raw; SmackDown
9	2011	April 25	Raw; SmackDown
10	2016	July 19	Raw; SmackDown; NXT (outgoing only)
11	2017	April 10–11	Raw; SmackDown
12	2018	April 16–17	Raw; SmackDown; NXT (outgoing only)
13	2019	April 15 – May 8	Raw; SmackDown; 205 Live; NXT (outgoing only)
14	2019	October 11–14	Raw; SmackDown; NXT (outgoing only); 205 Live (outgoing only)
15	2020	October 9–12	Raw; SmackDown; NXT (outgoing only)
16	2021	October 1–4	Raw; SmackDown; NXT (outgoing only)
17	2023	April 28 – May 1	Raw; SmackDown; NXT (outgoing only)
18	2024	April 26–29	Raw; SmackDown; NXT (outgoing only)
