= 2016 WWE Draft =

WWE's intra-brand draft

2016 WWE draft
- The 2016 WWE Draft logo.

General information
- Sport: Professional wrestling
- Date: July 19, 2016
- Location: Worcester, Massachusetts

Overview
- League: WWE
- Teams: Raw; SmackDown; NXT (outgoing only)

The 2016 WWE draft was a professional wrestling event and the tenth WWE draft, the first since 2011, produced by the American professional wrestling promotion WWE between the Raw and SmackDown brands. It took place on July 19 during the live premiere of SmackDown on the USA Network in the United States broadcasting from the DCU Center in Worcester, Massachusetts.

== Background ==
In 2002, following the acquisition of the remains of World Championship Wrestling (WCW) and Extreme Championship Wrestling (ECW), the then-World Wrestling Federation (WWF, now WWE) introduced the brand split, dividing its roster among two brands, Raw and SmackDown, represented by the shows of the same name. The brand split would continue until 2011, with a draft held every year (except 2003) to refresh the brands' rosters. In August 2011, the brand split ended, allowing all WWE wrestlers to appear on both shows.

In mid-2016, with a larger roster of wrestlers, in part thanks to WWE's developmental brand NXT, WWE decided to reintroduce the brand split with a draft to be held on the July 19 episode of SmackDown – the show's debut broadcast on the USA Network, as well as its renaming to SmackDown Live (with the show now broadcasting live as it was previously aired on tape delay). On the July 11 episode of Monday Night Raw, WWE Chairman and Chief Executive Officer Vince McMahon appointed Shane McMahon as the commissioner of SmackDown and Stephanie McMahon as the commissioner of Raw. The following week, the commissioners introduced Mick Foley and Daniel Bryan as the general managers of Raw and SmackDown, respectively.

The rules of the draft were posted to WWE's website on July 17. They were the following:

- Raw received the first overall draft pick.
- For every two draft picks for SmackDown, Raw received three picks (due to Raw being a three-hour show, while SmackDown is two hours).
- Tag teams counted as one pick unless a commissioner/general manager specifically only wanted a single member from the team as their pick.
- Six draft picks had to be made from the NXT roster; title holders could not be picked.

== Results ==
In addition to the televised draft, the live episode of SmackDown also featured several matches.

No.	Results	Stipulations	Times
1	John Cena defeated Luke Gallows	Singles match	5:25
2	Darren Young and Zack Ryder defeated The Miz and Rusev by submission	Tag team match	4:05
3	Bray Wyatt defeated Xavier Woods	Singles match	4:45
4	Dana Brooke and Charlotte defeated Sasha Banks	2-on-1 handicap match	2:18
5	Chris Jericho defeated Cesaro	Singles match	4:52
6	Dean Ambrose (c) defeated Seth Rollins	Singles match for the WWE Championship	12:17
(c) / – the champion(s) heading into the match

== Selections ==
=== SmackDown Live ===
The following is the list of wrestlers who were drafted on SmackDown Live.

Rnd.	Pick #	Brand	Brand pick #	Employee	Notes
1	1	Raw	1	Seth Rollins	
1	2	SmackDown	1	Dean Ambrose	WWE Champion
1	3	Raw	2	Charlotte	WWE Women's Champion
1	4	SmackDown	2	AJ Styles	
1	5	Raw	3	Finn Bálor	Drafted from NXT
2	6	Raw	4	Roman Reigns	
2	7	SmackDown	3	John Cena	
2	8	Raw	5	Brock Lesnar	
2	9	SmackDown	4	Randy Orton	
2	10	Raw	6	The New Day (Big E, Kofi Kingston, and Xavier Woods)	WWE Tag Team Champions
3	11	Raw	7	Sami Zayn	
3	12	SmackDown	5	Bray Wyatt	
3	13	Raw	8	Sasha Banks	
3	14	SmackDown	6	Becky Lynch	
3	15	Raw	9	Chris Jericho	
4	16	Raw	10	Rusev with Lana	WWE United States Champion
4	17	SmackDown	7	The Miz with Maryse	WWE Intercontinental Champion
4	18	Raw	11	Kevin Owens	
4	19	SmackDown	8	Baron Corbin	
4	20	Raw	12	Enzo and Cass (Enzo Amore and Big Cass)	
5	21	Raw	13	Luke Gallows and Karl Anderson	
5	22	SmackDown	9	American Alpha (Jason Jordan and Chad Gable)	Drafted from NXT
5	23	Raw	14	Big Show	
5	24	SmackDown	10	Dolph Ziggler	
5	25	Raw	15	Nia Jax	Drafted from NXT
6	26	Raw	16	Neville	
6	27	SmackDown	11	Natalya	
6	28	Raw	17	Cesaro	
6	29	SmackDown	12	Alberto Del Rio	
6	30	Raw	18	Sheamus	

=== WWE Draft Center Live ===
The following is the list of wrestlers who were drafted on the WWE Draft Center Live special on the WWE Network.

Rnd.	Pick #	Brand	Brand pick #	Employee	Notes
7	31	Raw	19	Golden Truth (Goldust and R-Truth)	
7	32	SmackDown	13	The Usos (Jimmy Uso and Jey Uso)	
7	33	Raw	20	Titus O'Neil	
7	34	SmackDown	14	Kane	
7	35	Raw	21	Paige	
8	36	Raw	22	Darren Young with Bob Backlund	
8	37	SmackDown	15	Kalisto	
8	38	Raw	23	Sin Cara	
8	39	SmackDown	16	Naomi	
8	40	Raw	24	Jack Swagger	
8	41	SmackDown	17	The Ascension (Konnor and Viktor)	
9	42	Raw	25	Dudley Boyz (Bubba Ray Dudley and D-Von Dudley)	
9	43	SmackDown	18	Zack Ryder	
9	44	Raw	26	Summer Rae	
9	45	SmackDown	19	Apollo Crews	
9	46	Raw	27	Mark Henry	
9	47	SmackDown	20	Alexa Bliss	Drafted from NXT
10	48	Raw	28	Braun Strowman	
10	49	SmackDown	21	Breezango (Tyler Breeze and Fandango)	
10	50	Raw	29	Bo Dallas	
10	51	SmackDown	22	Eva Marie	
10	52	Raw	30	The Shining Stars (Primo and Epico)	
10	53	SmackDown	23	Vaudevillains (Aiden English and Simon Gotch)	
11	54	Raw	31	Alicia Fox	
11	55	SmackDown	24	Erick Rowan	
11	56	Raw	32	Dana Brooke	
11	57	SmackDown	25	Mojo Rawley	Drafted from NXT
11	58	Raw	33	Curtis Axel	
11	59	SmackDown	26	Carmella	Drafted from NXT

=== Undrafted ===
Several wrestlers remained undrafted mainly due to injury or inactivity, some of which eventually were assigned to a brand. The chart is organized by date.

Employee	Reason for not being drafted	Subsequent status	Date	Notes
Ryback	Contract dispute	Released	August 8, 2016	Ryback was released from WWE due to a contract dispute.
Nikki Bella	Neck injury	SmackDown	August 21, 2016	Returned at SummerSlam, replacing the suspended Eva Marie, in a SmackDown match teaming with Natalya and Alexa Bliss to defeat Becky Lynch, Naomi, and Carmella.
Triple H	Semi-active	Unaffilliated	August 29, 2016	Returned on Raw and attacked Seth Rollins, and subsequently only appeared on Raw but never declared an affiliation to any brand.
Heath Slater	Only active wrestler not to be drafted	SmackDown	September 13, 2016	Earned a SmackDown contract after winning the WWE SmackDown Tag Team Championship tournament with Rhyno at Backlash.
Luke Harper	Knee injury	SmackDown	October 9, 2016	Returned at No Mercy to help Bray Wyatt defeat Randy Orton.
Rosa Mendes	Maternity leave	Retired	February 13, 2017	Announced retirement on February 13, 2017.
Emma	Back injury	Raw	February 13, 2017	Returned to the Raw brand as "Emmalina", then announced her makeover back to "Emma". She was off television until April 3, 2017, where she returned as her evil-Emma character.
The Undertaker	Semi-active	Unaffiliated	January 9, 2017	Returned at SmackDown's 900th episode on November 15, 2016. Subsequently, appeared on the January 9, 2017 episode of Raw, where he declared his unaffiliation to any brand.
Tamina	Knee injury	SmackDown	April 11, 2017	Returned as part of the Superstar Shake-up.
Tyson Kidd	Neck injury	Retired	June 29, 2017	Suffered a life-threatening spinal injury on June 8, 2015. On June 29, 2017, Kidd officially retired from in-ring competition and became a producer.
The Rock	Semi-active	Retired	August 2, 2019	Announced he had quietly retired on August 2, 2019. Even after coming out of retirement and returning to WWE on a part-time basis on 2024, The Rock did not affiliate with any brand.

Notes

- Tag teams/stables broken up as a result of the draft were The Wyatt Family (Bray Wyatt and Erick Rowan to SmackDown, Braun Strowman to Raw; Luke Harper went undrafted due to having suffered a knee injury before the draft, but was signed by SmackDown), The Club (AJ Styles to SmackDown, Luke Gallows and Karl Anderson to Raw), and The Social Outcasts (Bo Dallas and Curtis Axel to Raw; Heath Slater went undrafted but was eventually signed by SmackDown).
- Lana, Maryse, and Bob Backlund were each drafted in the same pick as their respective clients. Dana Brooke was drafted separately from her client Charlotte, but continued to manage her for several months afterwards.
- Of the six NXT draft picks, two were made by Raw (Finn Bálor and Nia Jax), the other four were made by SmackDown (American Alpha (Jason Jordan and Chad Gable), Alexa Bliss, Mojo Rawley, and Carmella).
- After the results at Battleground, Raw was the home of three WWE titles (WWE Women's Championship, WWE Tag Team Championship, and United States Championship), while SmackDown was the home of two WWE titles (WWE Championship and Intercontinental Championship). The WWE Universal Championship was introduced for Raw on July 25, 2016; the WWE Championship was subsequently renamed to WWE World Championship (it was reverted to WWE Championship in December 2016). The WWE SmackDown Tag Team Championship and WWE SmackDown Women's Championship were unveiled on August 23, 2016; Raw's Women's and Tag Team titles were subsequently renamed to reflect their exclusivity to Raw. A new WWE Cruiserweight Championship was then unveiled for the cruiserweight division on September 14, 2016 (originally part of Raw, but made exclusive to the 205 Live brand in 2018).

== Response and aftermath ==
Following the brand extension draft, former WWE wrestlers made their return to WWE and sided with either Raw or SmackDown. Within the next month, Jinder Mahal and Brian Kendrick returned on Raw, while Rhyno and Curt Hawkins joined SmackDown. Shelton Benjamin was announced to return on SmackDown, but his return was put on hiatus due to a torn rotator cuff, which required surgery. In September, Raw draftee Jack Swagger moved to SmackDown. Various competitors from the Cruiserweight Classic also signed contracts with Raw due to being a part of the cruiserweight division. Former NXT Women's Champion Bayley joined Raw after her final match at NXT TakeOver: Brooklyn II.

On November 29, 2016, a new show called 205 Live premiered. The new show exclusively features WWE's cruiserweight division. The division was formerly exclusive to Monday Night Raw, but became shared between Raw and 205 Live until 205 Live became its own brand in 2018.

As a result of the reintroduction of the brand extension, the July 19 Draft episode (and the first live episode) of SmackDown on Tuesdays gained a viewership by 2.2 rating with 3.17 million viewers (compare to Raw's rating with 3.04 million viewers on the previous night), and was SmackDown's highest rated episode since December 2010.
