= List of WWE Raw guest stars =

The WWE Raw guest star is a concept which involves a current or former WWE performer, mainstream celebrity or, sports personality making a guest appearance, assuming the on-screen role as a guest star for that particular episode. The guest star also often participates in backstage vignettes with members of the WWE roster.

The concept was introduced on the June 15, 2009 episode of WWE Raw by Donald Trump, who at the time was involved in an angle where he was the owner of the Raw franchise. On June 22, after having regained ownership of Raw, WWE Chairman Vince McMahon announced that Trump's initiative would go into effect on June 29, with the first star being Batista. For almost a year, Raw featured a guest star each week except for the week of April 26, 2010 episode, which featured the 2010 WWE Draft. As of June 14, 2010, WWE decided to slowly phase out the guest star concept on Raw, by only scheduling guest stars every other week, with the possibility of having a guest star only when needed.

Guest hosts differ from guest stars in that they have the power of a Raw brand General Manager. On May 10, 2010, it was announced that all future guest stars would no longer have that power in a decision made by the Raw general manager Vickie Guerrero who later quit the role that night. The guest host position was renamed to guest star, and the general manager position returned. In November 2014, the guest host position returned after a 3-year hiatus.

Since the WWE Raw guest star concept was established there have been 73 episodes that have featured 92 stars.

== Guest host history ==
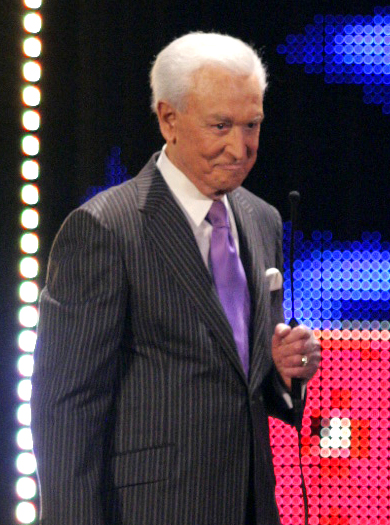
Bob Barker as Raw guest host. His stint earned him the Guest Host of the Year award at the 2009 Slammy Awards.

Host(s)	Venue	Location	Date	Ref.
Batista	HP Pavilion at San Jose	San Jose, California	June 29, 2009	
"The Million Dollar Man" Ted DiBiase	HP Pavilion at San Jose	San Jose, California	July 6, 2009	
Seth Green	Amway Arena	Orlando, Florida	July 13, 2009	
ZZ Top (Billy Gibbons and Dusty Hill)	RBC Center	Raleigh, North Carolina	July 20, 2009	
Shaquille O'Neal	Verizon Center	Washington, D.C.	July 27, 2009	
Jeremy Piven	Mohegan Sun Arena	Uncasville, Connecticut	August 3, 2009	
Sgt. Slaughter	Pengrowth Saddledome	Calgary, Alberta	August 10, 2009	
Freddie Prinze Jr.	Scottrade Center	St. Louis, Missouri	August 17, 2009	
Floyd Mayweather Jr.	Thomas & Mack Center	Paradise, Nevada	August 24, 2009	
Dusty Rhodes	Joe Louis Arena	Detroit, Michigan	August 31, 2009	
Bob Barker	Allstate Arena	Rosemont, Illinois	September 7, 2009	
Trish Stratus	Air Canada Centre	Toronto, Ontario	September 14, 2009	
Cedric the Entertainer	Verizon Arena	Little Rock, Arkansas	September 21, 2009	
Al Sharpton	Times Union Center	Albany, New York	September 28, 2009	
Ben Roethlisberger	Wachovia Arena at Casey Plaza	Wilkes-Barre, Pennsylvania	October 5, 2009	
Nancy O'Dell and Maria Menounos	Conseco Fieldhouse	Indianapolis, Indiana	October 12, 2009	
Snoop Dogg	Jacksonville Veterans Memorial Arena	Jacksonville, Florida	October 19, 2009	
Kyle Busch and Joey Logano	HSBC Arena	Buffalo, New York	October 26, 2009	
Ozzy and Sharon Osbourne	DCU Center	Worcester, Massachusetts	November 2, 2009	
Ricky Hatton	Sheffield Arena	Sheffield, England	November 9, 2009	
Roddy Piper	Madison Square Garden	New York, New York	November 16, 2009	
Jesse Ventura	Giant Center	Hershey, Pennsylvania	November 23, 2009	
Verne Troyer	1st Mariner Arena	Baltimore, Maryland	November 30, 2009	
Mark Cuban	American Airlines Center	Dallas, Texas	December 7, 2009	
Dennis Miller	American Bank Center	Corpus Christi, Texas	December 14, 2009	
Johnny Damon	St. Pete Times Forum	Tampa, Florida	December 21, 2009	
Timbaland	XL Center	Hartford, Connecticut	December 28, 2009	
Bret Hart	Nutter Center	Dayton, Ohio	January 4, 2010	
Mike Tyson	Target Center	Minneapolis, Minnesota	January 11, 2010	
Jon Heder and Don Johnson	Thompson–Boling Arena	Knoxville, Tennessee	January 18, 2010	
Dulé Hill	Nationwide Arena	Columbus, Ohio	January 25, 2010	
William Shatner	Sommet Center	Nashville, Tennessee	February 1, 2010	
Carl Edwards	Cajundome	Lafayette, Louisiana	February 8, 2010	
Jerry Springer	Wells Fargo Arena	Des Moines, Iowa	February 15, 2010	
Jewel and Ty Murray	Conseco Fieldhouse	Indianapolis, Indiana	February 22, 2010	
Cheech & Chong	Ford Center	Oklahoma City, Oklahoma	March 1, 2010	
Criss Angel	Rose Garden Arena	Portland, Oregon	March 8, 2010	
Stone Cold Steve Austin	San Diego Sports Arena	San Diego, California	March 15, 2010	
Pete Rose	HP Pavilion at San Jose	San Jose, California	March 22, 2010	
Rob Corddry, Clark Duke and Craig Robinson	US Airways Center	Phoenix, Arizona	March 29, 2010	
David Otunga	iWireless Center	Moline, Illinois	April 5, 2010	
David Hasselhoff	The O2 Arena	London, England	April 12, 2010	
Will Forte, Kristen Wiig and Ryan Phillippe	Izod Center	East Rutherford, New Jersey	April 19, 2010	
Wayne Brady	Jacksonville Veterans Memorial Arena	Jacksonville, Florida	May 3, 2010	
Flavor Flav	Mellon Arena	Pittsburgh, Pennsylvania	May 10, 2010	
Daniel Bryan	Bankers Life Fieldhouse	Indianapolis, Indiana	November 24, 2014	
Chris Jericho	Joe Louis Arena	Detroit, Michigan	December 15, 2014	
Hulk Hogan	Target Center	Minneapolis, Minnesota	December 22, 2014	
Edge and Christian	Verizon Center	Washington, D.C.	December 29, 2014	

== Guest star history ==
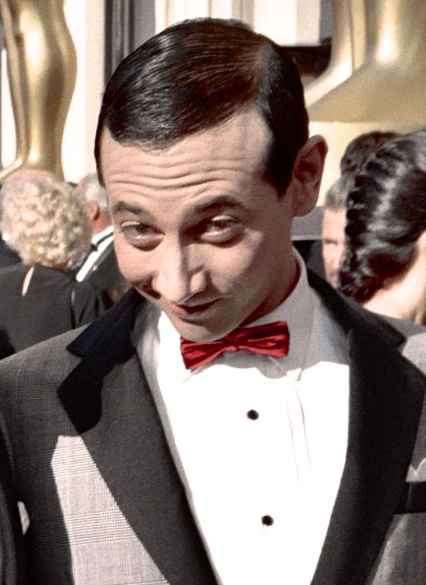
Pee-wee Herman (Paul Reubens), who won the Guest Star Shining Moment of the Year award at the 2010 Slammy Awards.

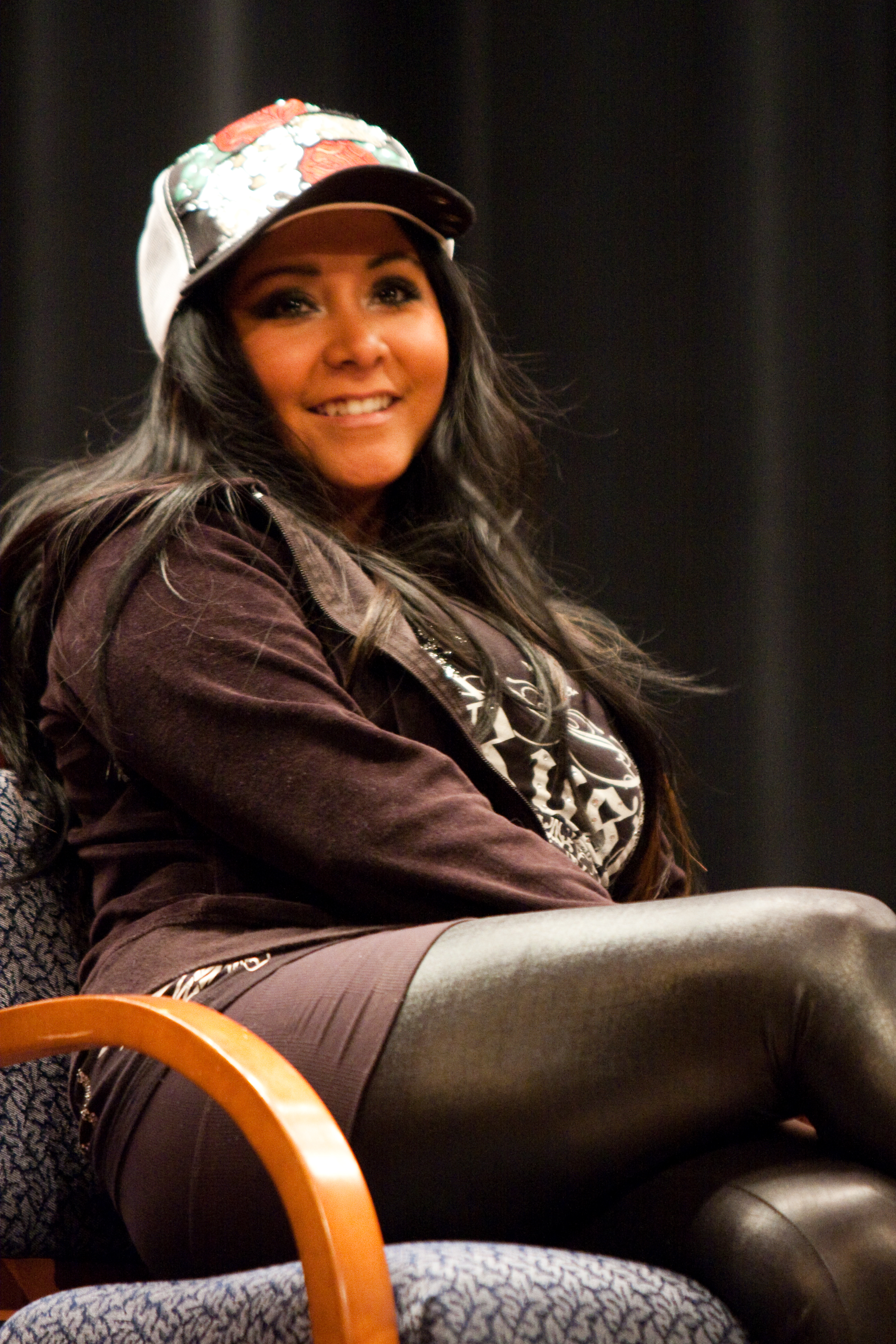
Snooki, whose stint led to a match at WrestleMania XXVII (which she won), and the A-Lister of the Year award at the 2011 Slammy Awards.

Star(s)	Venue	Location	Date	Ref.
Buzz Aldrin	Air Canada Centre	Toronto, Ontario	May 17, 2010	
Jon Lovitz	Huntington Center	Toledo, Ohio	May 24, 2010	
Ashton Kutcher	Frank Erwin Center	Austin, Texas	May 31, 2010	
Bradley Cooper, Quinton Jackson and Sharlto Copley	American Airlines Arena	Miami, Florida	June 7, 2010	
Mark Feuerstein	Time Warner Cable Arena	Charlotte, North Carolina	June 14, 2010	
Rob Zombie	Wachovia Center	Philadelphia, Pennsylvania	June 28, 2010	
Florence Henderson	Rupp Arena	Lexington, Kentucky	July 12, 2010	
Justin Long, Charlie Day and Jason Sudeikis	Staples Center	Los Angeles, California	August 16, 2010	
Chad Ochocinco	U.S. Bank Arena	Cincinnati, Ohio	September 13, 2010	
Johnny Knoxville	Intrust Bank Arena	Wichita, Kansas	October 4, 2010	
Bobb'e J. Thompson	Pengrowth Saddledome	Calgary, Alberta	October 18, 2010	
Toby Keith	Resch Center	Green Bay, Wisconsin	October 25, 2010	
Paul Reubens (as Pee-wee Herman)	Nassau Veterans Memorial Coliseum	Uniondale, New York	November 1, 2010	
Rima Fakih	Wells Fargo Center	Philadelphia, Pennsylvania	November 29, 2010	
Ariel Winter	Honda Center	Anaheim, California	February 14, 2011	
Snooki	Scottrade Center	St. Louis, Missouri	March 14, 2011	
Pitbull and Mýa	American Airlines Arena	Miami, Florida	May 2, 2011	
Shawn Michaels	Thomas & Mack Center	Paradise, Nevada	June 27, 2011	
Hugh Jackman	Quicken Loans Arena	Cleveland, Ohio	September 19, 2011	
The Muppets	Philips Arena	Atlanta, Georgia	October 31, 2011	
Perez Hilton	Honda Center	Anaheim, California	January 16, 2012	
James Roday	Quicken Loans Arena	Cleveland, Ohio	March 12, 2012	
The Three Stooges (Moe Howard, Larry Fine and Curly Howard) (played by Chris Diamantopoulos, Sean Hayes and Will Sasso respectively)	Verizon Center	Washington, D.C.	April 9, 2012	
Cyndi Lauper	Nassau Veterans Memorial Coliseum	Uniondale, New York	June 18, 2012	
Charlie Sheen (via Skype)	Scottrade Center	St. Louis, Missouri	July 23, 2012	
Jared Fogle	Webster Bank Arena	Bridgeport, Connecticut	September 17, 2012	
Larry and Shawn King	Power Balance Pavilion	Sacramento, California	October 8, 2012	
Mick Foley (as Santa Claus)	Consol Energy Center	Pittsburgh, Pennsylvania	December 24, 2012	
Michael Strahan	Nassau Veterans Memorial Coliseum	Uniondale, New York	November 25, 2013	
Betty White	Staples Center	Los Angeles, California	February 10, 2014	
Aaron Paul	Allstate Arena	Rosemont, Illinois	March 3, 2014	
Arnold Schwarzenegger and Joe Manganiello	Barclays Center	Brooklyn, New York	March 24, 2014	
Hugh Jackman	Scottrade Center	St. Louis, Missouri	April 28, 2014	
Kevin Hart	Quicken Loans Arena	Cleveland, Ohio	June 16, 2014	
Bret Hart	Bell Centre	Montreal, Quebec	July 7, 2014	
Flo Rida	American Airlines Arena	Miami, Florida	July 21, 2014	
Jerry Springer	Baltimore Arena	Baltimore, Maryland	September 8, 2014	
Kathie Lee Gifford and Hoda Kotb	Barclays Center	Brooklyn, New York	October 6, 2014	
Grumpy Cat	Roanoke Civic Center	Roanoke, Virginia	November 17, 2014	
Larry the Cable Guy and Santino Marella	Bankers Life Fieldhouse	Indianapolis, Indiana	November 24, 2014	
Jon Stewart	Prudential Center	Newark, New Jersey	March 2, 2015	
Wiz Khalifa	Consol Energy Center	Pittsburgh, Pennsylvania	March 9, 2015	
Snoop Dogg and Bill Simmons	Staples Center	Los Angeles, California	March 23, 2015	
Stephen Amell	KeyArena	Seattle, Washington	August 10, 2015	
Wayne Rooney	Manchester Arena	Manchester, England	November 9, 2015	
Dr. Phil	Staples Center	Los Angeles, California	April 11, 2016	
Sean Combs	Honda Center	Anaheim, California	August 8, 2016	
Ashton Kutcher and Danny Masterson	Staples Center	Los Angeles, California	October 3, 2016	
Josh Duhamel	Staples Center	Los Angeles, California	June 26, 2017	
LaVar Ball	Staples Center	Los Angeles, California	June 26, 2017	
Michael Che and Colin Jost	Wells Fargo Center	Philadelphia, Pennsylvania	March 4, 2019	
