= 2002 WWF Draft Lottery =

WWF's intra-brand draft

2002 WWF draft lottery

General information
- Sport: Professional wrestling
- Date: March 25, 2002
- Location: State College, Pennsylvania

Overview
- League: World Wrestling Federation
- Teams: Raw; SmackDown!

The 2002 World Wrestling Federation (WWF) draft lottery, the initial WWF draft, took place at Penn State University in State College, Pennsylvania, on March 25. The first half of the draft was televised live on TNN for two hours, as part of the WWF's program, Raw. The second half was conducted over the Internet on WWF's official website, WWF.com. There were thirty draft picks, with sixty wrestlers drafted overall by co-owners of the WWF, onto their respective brands, Raw and SmackDown!. The remaining wrestlers were divided randomly in a draft lottery, with each brand receiving a grand total of thirty wrestlers.

== Background ==
On March 17, 2002, World Wrestling Federation (WWF) Chairman Vince McMahon announced that the company would represent its business of professional wrestling through two distinct brands named after the WWF's weekly television programs, Raw and SmackDown!. This was a direct result of the acquisition of World Championship Wrestling (WCW) and Extreme Championship Wrestling (ECW), the WWF's primary rival corporations throughout the 1990s, that resulted in the addition of numerous talent to the extensive WWF roster.

In terms of storyline, Ric Flair had become fifty percent owner of the WWF following Survivor Series 2001 after Shane and Stephanie had sold their stocks to him in order to purchase WCW and ECW, respectively, a campaign to launch The Invasion. Original full WWF owner Vince McMahon detested having to share his creation with Flair and sought to dissolve their partnership. Simultaneously, Flair was engaged in a feud with The Undertaker and wanted to conclude it with a bout at WrestleMania X8. However, the WWF Board of Directors would only allow the match if Flair returned full ownership back to McMahon. Flair agreed, but the Board stated that it would review the WWF's status and ownership following WrestleMania.

In continuation with storyline, the Board's ultimate decision was to split the entire WWF roster into two separate entities, with McMahon in control of the SmackDown! brand and Flair in control of the Raw brand. All WWF wrestlers were to be assigned to a brand based on random selections conducted through a mock-draft lottery. On the March 25, 2002 episode of Raw, the WWF Draft was held, in which each owner received a total of thirty picks.

== Selections ==
On the March 25, 2002, episode of Raw, Vince McMahon won a coin toss to determine who would receive the first draft selection.

Pick No.	Brand (to)	Round No.	Employee	Notes
1	SmackDown!	1	The Rock	
2	Raw	1	The Undertaker	
3	SmackDown!	2	Kurt Angle	
4	Raw	2	nWo (Kevin Nash, X-Pac and Scott Hall)	
5	SmackDown!	3	Chris Benoit	Drafted while recovering from neck surgery. Benoit returned on the Raw brand instead.
6	Raw	3	Kane	
7	SmackDown!	4	Hollywood Hulk Hogan	
8	Raw	4	Rob Van Dam	Van Dam was the WWF Intercontinental Champion, making the title exclusive to Raw.
9	SmackDown!	5	Billy Gunn and Chuck Palumbo	Billy and Chuck were the WWF Tag Team Champions, making the titles exclusive to SmackDown!. In addition, Billy and Chuck's manager, Rico, went along with them in the draft.
10	Raw	5	Booker T	
11	SmackDown!	6	Edge	
12	Raw	6	Big Show	
13	SmackDown!	7	Rikishi	
14	Raw	7	Bubba Ray Dudley	
15	SmackDown!	8	D-Von Dudley	
16	Raw	8	Brock Lesnar	McMahon attempted to use his 9th draft pick for Lesnar but, as it was not his pick, Flair immediately picked Lesnar as his 8th pick. Lesnar's manager, Paul Heyman, went along with him in the draft.
17	SmackDown!	9	Mark Henry	
18	Raw	9	William Regal	Regal was the WWF European Champion, making the title exclusive to Raw.
19	SmackDown!	10	Maven	Maven was the WWF Hardcore Champion, making the title exclusive to SmackDown!. However, Raven defeated Maven for the championship prior to the brand separation, bringing the title to Raw with him.
20	Raw	10	Lita	
21	SmackDown!	11	Billy Kidman	
22	Raw	11	Bradshaw	
23	SmackDown!	12	Tajiri	Tajiri was the WWF Cruiserweight Champion, making the title exclusive to SmackDown!.
24	Raw	12	Steven Richards	
25	SmackDown!	13	Chris Jericho	
26	Raw	13	Matt Hardy	
27	SmackDown!	14	Ivory	
28	Raw	14	Raven	
29	SmackDown!	15	Albert	
30	Raw	15	Jeff Hardy	
31	SmackDown!	16	The Hurricane	
32	Raw	16	Mr. Perfect	
33	SmackDown!	17	Al Snow	
34	Raw	17	Spike Dudley	
35	SmackDown!	18	Lance Storm	
36	Raw	18	D'Lo Brown	
37	SmackDown!	19	Diamond Dallas Page	
38	Raw	19	Shawn Stasiak	
39	SmackDown!	20	Torrie Wilson	
40	Raw	20	Terri	
41	SmackDown!	21	Scotty 2 Hotty	
42	Raw	21	Jacqueline	
43	SmackDown!	22	Stacy Keibler	
44	Raw	22	Goldust	
45	SmackDown!	23	Christian	
46	Raw	23	Trish Stratus	
47	SmackDown!	24	Test	
48	Raw	24	Justin Credible	
49	SmackDown!	25	Faarooq	
50	Raw	25	Big Boss Man	
51	SmackDown!	26	Tazz	
52	Raw	26	Tommy Dreamer	
53	SmackDown!	27	Hardcore Holly	
54	Raw	27	Crash Holly	
55	SmackDown!	28	Val Venis	
56	Raw	28	Mighty Molly	
57	SmackDown!	29	Perry Saturn	

Notes:

- Picks No. 1–20 were made live on Raw
- Picks No. 21–57 were conducted via lottery on the WWF's website

=== Undrafted ===
Several wrestlers remained undrafted for various reasons.

Employee	Reason for not being drafted	Status after being drafted
Triple H	Triple H was the Undisputed WWF Champion, and could appear on either show as the title represented both brands. It was stipulated that whoever was to defeat him for the title, he would join that challenger’s home brand. Hollywood Hulk Hogan, a member of the SmackDown! Brand, won the title from Triple H, thus Triple H was assigned to SmackDown!	SmackDown!
Jazz	Jazz was the WWF Women's Champion, and could appear on either show as the title represented both brands. After losing the title, she joined the Raw brand.	Raw
Chris Jericho	Had a match for the Undisputed WWF Championship the night of the draft. After losing, Jericho joined SmackDown!.	SmackDown!
Stephanie McMahon	Had a match for the Undisputed WWF Championship the night of the draft. After losing, McMahon was forced to leave the company. She later returned as the SmackDown! General Manager.	SmackDown!
Stone Cold Steve Austin	Austin was considered a free agent in the draft by Linda McMahon, and chose to sign to Raw.	Raw

== Aftermath ==
The brand extension was officially enforced on April 1, 2002. Stone Cold Steve Austin was made exempt from the draft by Linda McMahon, but later opted to sign with Raw. A month later, the WWF was sued by the World Wildlife Fund over the WWF initialism. This resulted in the company being renamed from "World Wrestling Federation Entertainment, Inc." to simply "World Wrestling Entertainment, Inc.", which caused all of the WWF's assets to be properly renamed and branded. The Flair and McMahon feud came to an end on the June 10, 2002 edition of Raw, when McMahon became the sole owner of WWE by defeating Flair in a No Holds Barred match. Following the situations with the brand extension and name change, by having two brands in place, the WWE was able to increase the number of live events held each year from 200 to 350, including tours in several new international markets. Even after the end of the first brand extension in 2011, WWE continued to have two touring live event shows. The brand extension returned in 2016.

After McMahon became the sole owner, the owner role was replaced by "general managers". For Raw, he announced the new general manager for Raw would be Eric Bischoff, and for SmackDown!, Stephanie McMahon. On the same night when he announced Stephanie as new general manager, he also stated that a free agent period has started and any Superstar could sign with the other brand. This continued until the fall of 2002. On the September 23 edition of Raw, Bischoff announced that the roster was frozen and the only way for a wrestler to move was to ask for a trade.
