= 2007 WWE Draft =

WWE's intra-brand draft

2007 WWE draft
- The WWE Draft logo used from 2007 to 2011.

General information
- Sport: Professional wrestling
- Date(s): June 11 and 17, 2007
- Location: Wilkes-Barre, Pennsylvania

Overview
- League: World Wrestling Entertainment
- Teams: Raw; SmackDown! ECW

The 2007 World Wrestling Entertainment (WWE) draft, the fifth WWE Draft, took place at the Wachovia Arena in Wilkes-Barre, Pennsylvania, on June 11. The first half of the draft was televised live for three hours on World Wrestling Entertainment's program, Raw on USA Network. The second half of the draft, or the "supplemental draft", was conducted over WWE's website, WWE.com, for four hours on June 17, 2007, as draft picks were announced at twenty-minute intervals. There were twenty-three draft picks, with twenty-seven wrestlers drafted overall, between the promotion's three main brands: Raw, SmackDown!, and ECW. For the televised half of the draft, each brand's draft pick was determined by nine matches, one being a battle royal for two draft picks, where wrestlers from their respective brands wrestled to earn a draft pick. The supplemental draft, however, was conducted randomly, with each brand receiving random draft selections. Raw and SmackDown! received five random draft picks, while ECW received three random draft picks. The televised draft picks were randomly selected by a computer that was shown on the Raw titantron. Every WWE wrestler from Raw, SmackDown!, and ECW was eligible to be drafted.

== Background ==
The draft was announced by Shane McMahon on the May 28, 2007, episode of Raw from the Air Canada Centre in Toronto, Ontario, and was promoted as the "first ever tri-branded draft". Besides the promoted draft, the show was billed as "Mr. McMahon Appreciation Night", a tribute of appreciation to the WWE Chairman, Vince McMahon, who was blown up in his limousine later that night.

The draft lottery is a concept used by WWE to improve its weekly television ratings of Raw, SmackDown! and ECW'. The WWE yet again used the concept in 2007, to improve its television ratings. The 2007 WWE draft was the first official draft lottery to take place in WWE since the 2005 WWE draft lottery.

== Selections ==
=== Televised draft ===
==== Matches ====
During the program, representatives from the Raw, ECW, and SmackDown! brands were involved in matches that determined which brand received a draft pick. Overall, there were 9 matches, of which SmackDown! got four, Raw got three and ECW got two.

No.	Results	Stipulations
1	Edge (SmackDown!) defeated John Cena (Raw)	Singles match for 1 draft pick
2	CM Punk (ECW) defeated Carlito (Raw)	Singles match for 1 draft pick
3	Umaga (Raw) defeated Balls Mahoney (ECW)	Singles match for 1 draft pick
4	Bobby Lashley (ECW) defeated Chris Benoit (SmackDown!)	Singles match for 1 draft pick
5	MVP (SmackDown!) defeated Santino Marella (Raw)	Singles match for 1 draft pick
6	The Miz (SmackDown!) defeated Snitsky (ECW)^{1}	Singles match for 1 draft pick
7	Candice Michelle (Raw) defeated Kristal Marshall (SmackDown!)	Singles match for 1 draft pick
8	Batista (SmackDown!) defeated Elijah Burke (ECW) and Jeff Hardy (Raw)	Triple Threat match for 1 draft pick
9	Randy Orton (Raw) won by last eliminating Matt Hardy (SmackDown!)^{8}	Tri-branded 15-man Battle royal for 2 draft picks

==== Selections ====
Pick No.	Brand (to)	Employee	Role	Brand (from)
1	SmackDown!	The Great Khali	Male wrestler	Raw
2	ECW	The Boogeyman	Male wrestler	SmackDown!
3	Raw	King Booker and Queen Sharmell^{2}	Male/female wrestler	SmackDown!
4	ECW	Chris Benoit	Male wrestler	SmackDown!
5	SmackDown!	Torrie Wilson	Female wrestler	Raw
6	SmackDown!	Chris Masters	Male wrestler	Raw
7	Raw	Bobby Lashley^{3}	Male wrestler	ECW
8	SmackDown!	Ric Flair	Male wrestler	Raw
9	Raw	Snitsky	Male wrestler	ECW
10	Raw	Mr. Kennedy	Male wrestler	SmackDown!

=== Supplemental draft ===
Pick No.	Brand (to)	Employee	Role	Brand (from)
11	Raw	Paul London and Brian Kendrick^{4}	Male tag team	SmackDown!
12	SmackDown!	Kenny Dykstra	Male wrestler	Raw
13	ECW	Viscera^{5}	Male wrestler	Raw
14	Raw	The Sandman	Male wrestler	ECW
15	SmackDown!	Hardcore Holly^{6}	Male wrestler	ECW
16	ECW	The Miz	Male wrestler	SmackDown!
17	Raw	Daivari	Male wrestler	SmackDown!
18	SmackDown!	Bret Major and Brian Major^{4}	Male tag team	ECW
19	Raw	William Regal	Male wrestler	SmackDown!
20	SmackDown!	Victoria	Female wrestler	Raw
21	Raw	Jillian	Female wrestler	SmackDown!
22	SmackDown!	Eugene	Male wrestler	Raw
23	ECW	Johnny Nitro^{7}	Male wrestler	Raw

- 1 – The referee reversed his decision to give The Miz the win due to Snitsky ignoring the referee whilst attacking Miz.
- 2 – This person was drafted alongside the drafted wrestler.
- 3 – Bobby Lashley was stripped of the ECW World Championship after being drafted to Raw, vacating the title as a result.
- 4 – Both members of the tag team were drafted in unison.
- 5 – Viscera would debut on the July 10 episode of ECW repackaged as Big Daddy V.
- 6 – Hardcore Holly made his re-debut on Raw rather than SmackDown!.
- 7 – Weeks after his ECW debut, Johnny Nitro would repackage himself as John Morrison.
- 8 - Other match participants: Raw; Johnny Nitro, Eugene, Kenny Dykstra, and Viscera. SmackDown!; Chris Masters, Mark Henry, Chavo Guerrero, and William Regal. ECW; Tommy Dreamer, The Sandman, Marcus Cor Von, Kevin Thorn, and Matt Striker.

== Aftermath ==
The 2007 draft lottery provided WWE's three brands with new wrestlers, allowing for new storylines and rivalries. Television ratings for WWE increased, as Raw, SmackDown!, and ECW became the most watched programs on their respective television networks in the summer of 2007. Four months after the draft, on October 16, 2007, it was announced that ECW and SmackDown! would have a talent exchange that would allow wrestlers from their respective brands to compete on either brand.
