= 2004 WWE Draft Lottery =

WWE's intra-brand draft

2004 WWE draft lottery
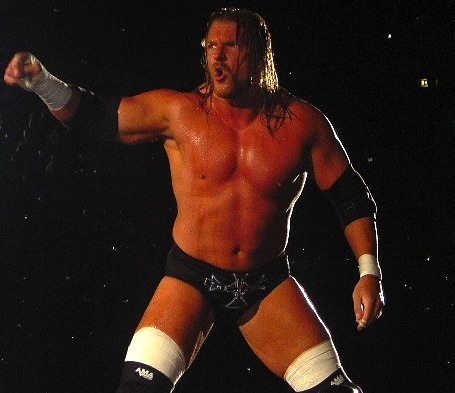
- Triple H, who was drafted to SmackDown! and traded back to Raw in the draft lottery.

General information
- Sport: Professional wrestling
- Date: March 22, 2004
- Location: Detroit

Overview
- League: World Wrestling Entertainment
- Teams: Raw; SmackDown!

The 2004 World Wrestling Entertainment (WWE) draft lottery, the second WWE draft, took place at the Joe Louis Arena in Detroit, Michigan on March 22. The draft took place live for two hours on WWE's television program, Raw on Spike TV. Post-draft trades were announced on WWE's official website, WWE.com, until midnight on March 22. There were twelve draft picks, with nineteen wrestlers overall switching between the promotion's two main brands: Raw and SmackDown!. During the draft lottery, the General manager of Raw, Eric Bischoff, and the General manager of SmackDown!, Paul Heyman, stood on opposite ends of the stage on the Raw set, where they drafted six wrestlers randomly via two machines. At the conclusion of the draft, the two GMs would then be allowed to trade anyone on the roster until Midnight EST, which was later extended until Tuesday night after Heyman resigned. Every WWE star was eligible to be drafted, including injured wrestlers, commentators, champions, and general managers.

The main event was a SmackDown! exclusive match, in which Eddie Guerrero defeated Triple H to retain the WWE Championship by disqualification after Christian attacked Guerrero resulting in a brawl between SmackDown! and Velocity wrestlers against Raw and Heat wrestlers.

== Background ==
The tagline for WrestleMania XX (that year's WrestleMania), was Where it all begins again. To remain with the tagline, on the March 15, 2004 episode of Raw, the chairman of WWE, Vince McMahon, announced that it was time "for a new WWE" and that a draft lottery would take place the following week on Raw. Both Raw and SmackDown! Wrestlers would be present for the draft lottery, as McMahon announced that every wrestler was eligible to be drafted, including commentators, ring announcers, referees, injured wrestlers, champions and even general managers.

== Selections ==
=== Draft lottery ===
Pick No.	Brand (to)	Wrestler	Role	Brand (from)
1	SmackDown!	René Duprée	Male wrestler	Raw
2	Raw	Shelton Benjamin	Male wrestler	SmackDown!
3	SmackDown!	Mark Jindrak	Male wrestler	Raw
4	Raw	Nidia	Female wrestler	SmackDown!
5	SmackDown!	Triple H^{1}	Male wrestler	Raw
6	Raw	Rhyno	Male wrestler	SmackDown!
7	SmackDown!	Rob Van Dam	Male wrestler	Raw
8	Raw	Tajiri	Male wrestler	SmackDown!
9	SmackDown!	Teddy Long	Manager	Raw
10	Raw	Edge	Male wrestler	SmackDown!
11	SmackDown!	Spike Dudley	Male wrestler	Raw
12	Raw	Paul Heyman^{2}	General manager	SmackDown!

=== Post-draft trades ===
Pick No.	Brand (to)	Wrestler	Role	Brand (from)
1	SmackDown!	Booker T; Bubba Ray and D-Von Dudley; Rico; Miss Jackie	Male/female wrestlers	Raw
2	Raw	A-Train; Chuck Palumbo; Triple H	Male wrestlers	SmackDown!

- 1 – Triple H was traded back to Raw prior to his redebut on the SmackDown! brand.
- 2 – Heyman resigned prior to his first appearance on the Raw brand.

== Aftermath ==
After Paul Heyman was drafted from the SmackDown! brand to the Raw brand, he (kayfabe) quit the WWE, thus leaving the SmackDown! brand without a general manager. Shortly after the draft, the WWE chairman, Vince McMahon announced that a new general manager had been appointed to the SmackDown! brand, and that he would conduct the supplemental trades with Raw general manager, Eric Bischoff. On the March 25, 2004 episode of SmackDown!, Kurt Angle came down to the ring and announced that he was the new SmackDown! General manager.
