= ECW (WWE brand) =

Former professional wrestling roster division

- Logo for the brand and the ECW television program from 2008 to 2010
- Product type: Hardcore wrestling Sports entertainment
- Current owner: World Wrestling Entertainment
- Produced by: Paul Heyman (2006); Vince McMahon (2006–2010)
- Country: United States
- Introduced: May 25, 2006
- Discontinued: February 16, 2010
- Related brands: Raw; SmackDown
- Tagline: A new breed unleashed The Tribe of Extreme has risen again!
- General Manager: Paul Heyman (2006); Armando Estrada (2007–2008); Theodore Long (2008–2009); Tiffany (2009–2010) Predecessor: Extreme Championship Wrestling Successor: NXT (WWE brand)

ECW (often pejoratively nicknamed WWECW to distinguish from its original 1990s predecessor and also referred to by its full name Extreme Championship Wrestling) was a brand of the American professional wrestling promotion World Wrestling Entertainment (WWE) that was established in May 2006 and discontinued in February 2010. Wrestlers that were assigned to ECW primarily appeared on the brand's weekly television program, ECW. The brand was established as a relaunch of the former Extreme Championship Wrestling (ECW) promotion, the assets of which WWE acquired in 2003.

The brand operated during the second half of WWE's first brand extension period (2002–2011), and was one of WWE's three main brands, along with Raw and SmackDown. In addition to the brand's television program, ECW wrestlers competed on the branded and co-branded pay-per-view events. From 2007 to 2009, ECW wrestlers also occasionally appeared on the Raw and SmackDown television programs due to talent exchange agreements between the brands. The brand was dissolved in February 2010, and its show was replaced by the reality series NXT, which was rebranded as WWE's developmental territory, NXT, in 2012.

== History ==
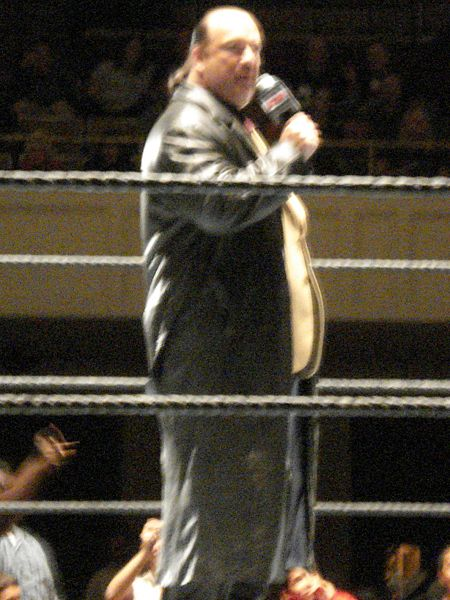
Paul Heyman, the first ECW Representative in the ring in 2006

In early-to-mid-2002, then World Wrestling Federation (WWF, later WWE) underwent a process they called the "brand extension". The WWF divided itself into two de facto wrestling promotions with separate rosters, storylines and authority figures. Raw and SmackDown! would host each division, give its name to the division and essentially compete against each other. The split came about as a result of the WWF purchasing its biggest competitor, World Championship Wrestling (WCW); and the subsequent doubling of its roster and championships. The brand extension was publicly announced by Linda McMahon during a telecast of Raw on March 25 and became official the next day. WWE acquired the rights to Extreme Championship Wrestling (ECW)'s trademarks and video library in 2003.

The enormous popularity of The Rise and Fall of ECW and other ECW merchandise prompted WWE to organize One Night Stand, an ECW reunion pay-per-view in 2005. The financial and critical success of the event motivated WWE to organize a second One Night Stand the following year. With rejuvenated interest in the ECW product, WWE began exploring the possibility of reviving the promotion full-time. On May 25, 2006, WWE announced the launch of ECW as a stand-alone brand, congruous to Raw and SmackDown!, with its own show on Sci Fi (now Syfy). On May 29, the WWE held their 2006 brand extension draft. The draft featured ECW founder Paul Heyman receiving two total draft picks from the existing Raw and SmackDown! rosters for the newly created ECW brand. During the draft, Rob Van Dam was drafted from Raw and Kurt Angle from SmackDown! as the marquee signings.

The ECW brand was initially produced differently from WWE's other brands. For televised events, the main ring-facing cameras were placed on a different location in the arena while the wrestling ring itself featured an ECW logo on the mat and blank turnbuckle covers. The male performers were referred to "Extremists" instead of "Superstars" while female performers were called "Vixens" rather than Divas. However, the brand steadily began being produced following the same format of the other brands and as opposed to the original promotion match rules, such as count outs and disqualifications, were now standard. Matches featuring the rule set of the original promotion were then classified as being contested under "Extreme Rules" and were only fought when specified.

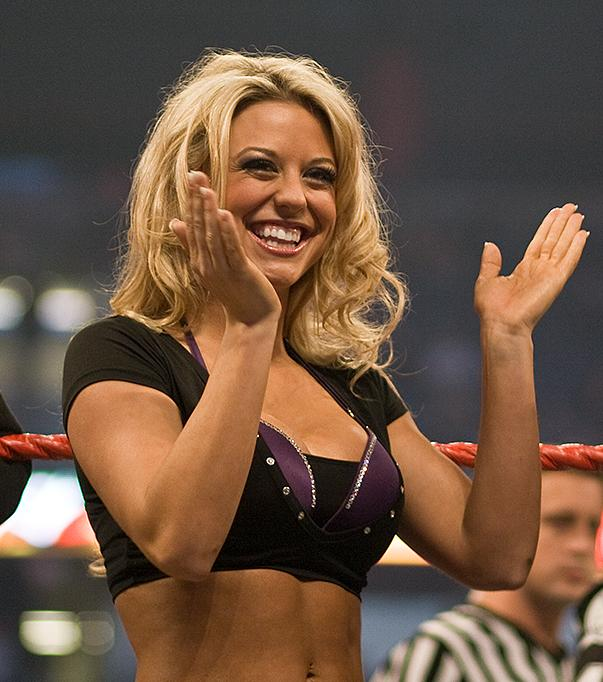
Tiffany (the final ECW General Manager) on Raw in November 2008

Former ECW owner Paul Heyman served as the on-air ECW Representative until December to Dismember, when Heyman was relieved from both his on and off-air duties with WWE. After Heyman left in late 2006, there was no ECW authority figure until August 14, 2007, when Armando Estrada was announced as the General Manager. On June 3, 2008, Estrada was replaced by Theodore Long. On the April 7, 2009 edition of ECW, it was announced that Long was returning to SmackDown to fulfill the role of General Manager. From this point, the Interim General Manager was named as Tiffany, who took over as full-time General Manager on the June 30 episode.

On October 16, 2007, a "talent exchange" was started between the SmackDown! and ECW brands, allowing their respective talent to appear on either brand. On the September 8, 2008 episode of Raw, it was announced a "talent exchange" was started also for the Raw brand with ECW, allowing their respective talent to appear on either brand whenever they feel like. Following the 2009 WWE draft, both of these talent exchanges were quietly dropped.

On February 2, 2010, WWE Chairman Vince McMahon announced that ECW would be going off the air and would air its final episode on February 16. The final match on the show was an extreme rules match where Ezekiel Jackson defeated ECW Champion Christian.

With the ECW brand permanently disbanded, the ECW roster were assigned to other brands. The ECW show was replaced by the reality series NXT, which was rebranded as WWE's developmental territory, NXT, in 2012.

== Championships ==
When ECW was revived in 2006 as a third brand, the ECW World Heavyweight Championship was reactivated and was intended to be the brand's only championship. The brand would later gain championships through the yearly WWE draft, but the ECW Championship was deactivated along with the ECW brand on February 16, 2010.

Championship	Time on brand
ECW Championship	June 13, 2006 – January 22, 2008; March 30, 2008 – June 23, 2008; June 29, 2008 – February 16, 2010
WWE Championship	June 13, 2006 – July 3, 2006
WWE United States Championship	June 23, 2008 – July 20, 2008
WWE Tag Team Championship	November 13, 2007 – July 20, 2008
World Tag Team Championship	December 13, 2008 – April 5, 2009

== Pay-per-view events ==
Date	Event	Venue	Location	Main event
June 11, 2006	One Night Stand	Hammerstein Ballroom	New York, New York	John Cena vs. Rob Van Dam for the WWE Championship
December 3, 2006	December to Dismember	James Brown Arena	Augusta, Georgia	Big Show vs. Bobby Lashley vs. CM Punk vs. Hardcore Holly vs. Rob Van Dam vs. Test in a six-man extreme Elimination Chamber match for the ECW Championship
