= WWE Tribute to the Troops =

American television special series

- Created by: Vince McMahon; John Layfield
- Starring: SmackDown roster
- Country of origin: United States
- No. of episodes: 20 (Note: 21 shows were produced, but only 20 aired as the 2019 event was non-televised. From 2003 to 2007, Tribute to the Troops aired as pre-taped episodes of SmackDown! and Raw, before being established as a stand-alone special in 2008. The 2023 edition was held as a live special edition of SmackDown.)

Production
- Running time: 120 minutes

Original release
- Network: UPN
- Release: December 25, 2003 – December 23, 2004
- Network: USA Network
- Release: December 19, 2005 – December 20, 2018
- Network: NBC
- Release: December 20, 2008 – December 27, 2014
- Network: Fox
- Release: December 6, 2020 – December 8, 2023

WWE Tribute to the Troops, or simply Tribute to the Troops, is a former annual American professional wrestling event that was held and produced by WWE and Armed Forces Entertainment. The show aired as a television special during the month of December (specifically during the holiday season), with the exception of the 2019 event, which was a special non-televised show, and the 2021 event, which aired in mid-November.

As its name implied, the show honored and entertained United States Armed Forces members; the first eight editions of Tribute to the Troops were held at U.S. military bases in Iraq and Afghanistan, with performers and employees traveling to these countries and interacting with troops, as well as visiting military camps, bases, and hospitals. From 2010 onward, the show was held at either a domestic military base or a venue near one, as well as visiting sites such as Walter Reed Army Medical Center and Bethesda Naval Hospital. Aside from 2020 (which was filmed at Amway Center due to the COVID-19 pandemic and the WWE ThunderDome), the 2021 event was the first not to be held at or near a military base.

From 2003 to 2007, Tribute to the Troops was broadcast as a special episode of either Raw or SmackDown!; beginning 2008, Tribute to the Troops became a standalone special, airing on NBC or, later on, USA Network. In 2020, after Tribute to the Troops was held as a non-televised event in 2019, the special moved to Fox as part of its rights to SmackDown. The 2023 Tribute to the Troops was held as a special episode of SmackDown; the special was quietly cancelled afterward.

== History ==
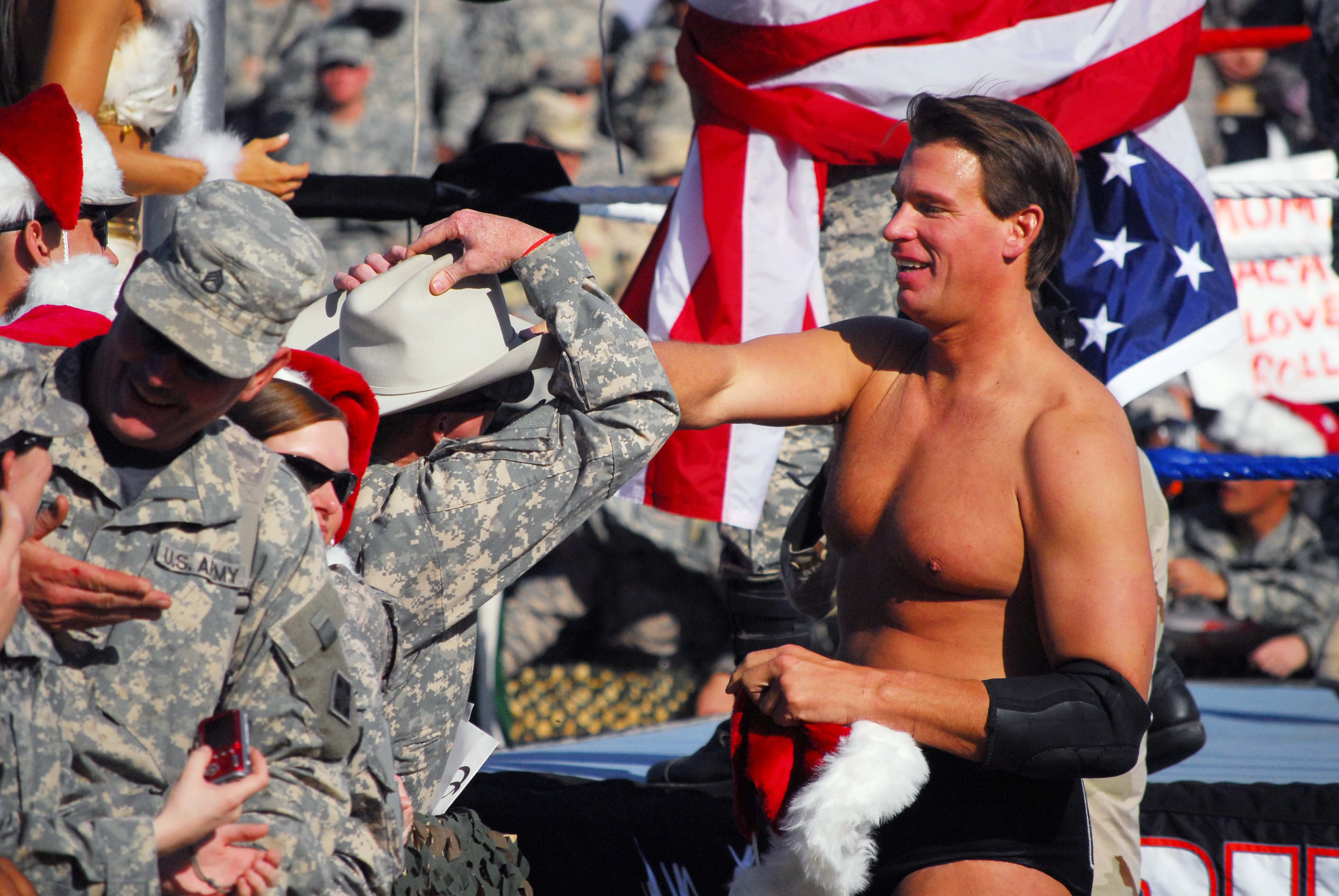
Series creator John Layfield interacting with soldiers

The idea of the event is credited to wrestler John "Bradshaw" Layfield, who suggested it to WWE Chairman Vince McMahon.

WWE first held the event in December 2003, from Camp Victory in Baghdad, Iraq and aired it on Christmas Day as a special episode of SmackDown!. In the main event, John Cena defeated Big Show, and Stone Cold Steve Austin came out after the match, performed a Stunner on both men, and finally invited all the talent backstage to the ring to celebrate. For this Tribute to the Troops and all others until 2011, commentary was recorded at WWE headquarters in Stamford, Connecticut, as commentators were not at ringside.

In December 2004, WWE traveled to COB Speicher in Tikrit, Iraq. The television show, Christmas in Iraq, aired on December 23 as another special SmackDown! episode. Eddie Guerrero and Rey Mysterio defeated Kurt Angle and Luther Reigns in the main event.

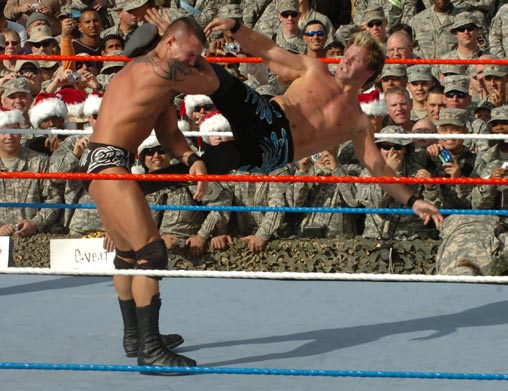
Chris Jericho performs an enzuigiri on Randy Orton during the 2007 Tribute to the Troops

On December 9, 2005, WWE held the event at the Bagram Airfield in Bagram, Afghanistan. It aired December 19, this time on USA Network as a special edition of WWE Raw. In the main event, Shawn Michaels beat Triple H in a Boot Camp match.

In 2006, the show was taped at Camp Victory in Baghdad, aired on Raw on Christmas Day, and had Carlito pin Randy Orton in the main event. A day before taping, a mortar attack happened near the camp, injuring 14 soldiers. Michael Cole reported details from the scene minutes later.

In 2007, WWE returned to Tikrit. D-Generation X members Triple H and Shawn Michaels defeated Umaga and Mr. Kennedy in the main event, which aired on Christmas Eve on WWE Raw.

2008's show from Camp Liberty, Baghdad was the first to air in a non-standard WWE timeslot, a one-hour December 20 special on NBC. In its main event, John Cena, Batista and Rey Mysterio defeated Chris Jericho, Big Show and Randy Orton in a six-man tag team match.

WWE again traveled to Iraq in 2009. In the main event from Joint Base Balad, John Cena retained his WWE Championship against Chris Jericho. It aired on December 19, 2009 on NBC.

In 2010, WWE held its first domestically hosted Tribute to the Troops, from Fort Hood in Killeen, Texas on December 11. It aired on NBC December 18 for one hour, with a message from former president George W. Bush. A two-hour version of the show aired December 22 on USA Network.

The 2019 edition marked the first and so far only time that the event was not aired on television.

The 2020 edition returned to television, this time being broadcast from Orlando's Amway Center, by way of the WWE ThunderDome bio-secure bubble. The one-hour special aired on Fox on December 6, adjunct to NFL coverage.

The 2023 edition was broadcast live as a special episode of SmackDown on December 8, 2023, from Amica Mutual Pavilion in Providence, Rhode Island. To cross promote the Army–Navy Game occurring the following day at Gillette Stadium, CBS college football commentator Brad Nessler made a guest appearance.

The Tribute to the Troops event was not held for 2024 with no tapings held. Dave Meltzer of the Wrestling Observer Newsletter reported on December 24, 2024, that Tribute to the Troops was done, "for the time being". Following the ousting of McMahon in January 2024 amidst the ongoing sex scandal, Meltzer said that a WWE source confirmed it to him without the company's acknowledgment.

== Awards and honors ==
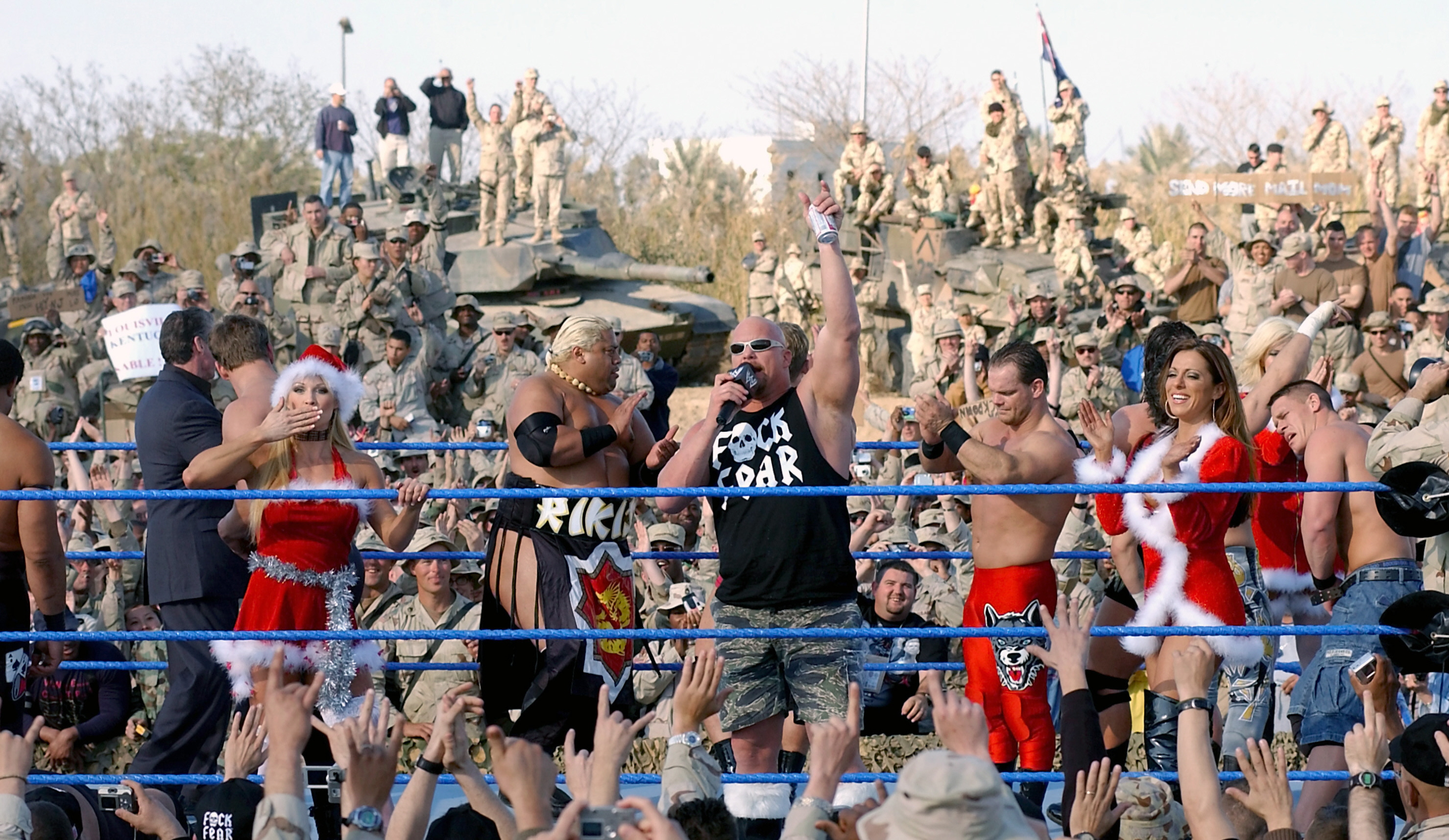
WWE wrestlers during the 2003 Tribute to the Troops

- In 2004, the United Service Organizations (USO) of Metropolitan Washington awarded WWE with the first-ever Legacy of Hope award "for its extensive support of our troops and the USO's Operation Care Package program".
- In 2005, the Army and Air Force Exchange Service (AAFES) awarded WWE the first-ever Three-Commander Coin Award "for WWE's support of its partnership with AAFES to improve the quality of life for our troops by supporting service members and their families worldwide".
- During the 2006 show, Director of Air Force Morale, Welfare and Recreation Art Myers presented WWE Chairman Vince McMahon with the Secretary of Defense Exceptional Public Service Award. McMahon immediately presented the award to John Bradshaw Layfield, who had the idea for the show.
- In 2007, WWE received the first Corporate Patriot Award at the annual GI Film Festival in Washington, D.C., "in recognition of its ongoing support and appreciation of the U.S. military and their families, particularly its annual holiday Tribute to the Troops tour to entertain troops in war zones in Iraq and Afghanistan".
- In 2008, then President George W. Bush aired a message during the show, thanking WWE for giving US troops the gift of entertainment every Christmas. He did so again in 2010.
- In 2011 and 2012, WWE aired messages from President Barack Obama during the broadcasts, expressing his gratitude for the Armed Forces for their service in Iraq and Afghanistan.
- In 2015, WWE themselves began presenting a custom WWE Championship belt to the servicemen and women who had helped in hosting the event and for their continued service to the country. The custom belt featured side plates that commemorated the year's event. They subsequently presented custom belts at every event thereafter.

== Events ==
#	Date	Airdate	Venue	Location
1	December 20, 2003	December 25, 2003	Camp Victory	Baghdad, Iraq
2	December 18, 2004	December 23, 2004	Camp Speicher	Tikrit, Iraq
3	December 9, 2005	December 19, 2005	Bagram Air Base	Bagram, Afghanistan
4	December 8, 2006	December 25, 2006	Camp Victory	Baghdad, Iraq
5	December 7, 2007	December 24, 2007	Camp Speicher	Tikrit, Iraq
6	December 5, 2008	December 20, 2008	Camp Victory	Baghdad, Iraq
7	December 4, 2009	December 19, 2009	Holt Memorial Stadium (Balad Air Base)	Balad, Iraq
8	December 11, 2010	December 18, 2010	Fort Hood	Killeen, Texas
9	December 9, 2011	December 19, 2011	Norfolk Scope	Norfolk, Virginia
10	December 11, 2012	December 13, 2012	Crown Coliseum	Fayetteville, North Carolina
11	December 11, 2013	December 28, 2013	Joint Base Lewis-McChord	Tacoma, Washington
12	December 11, 2014	December 17, 2014	Columbus Civic Center	Columbus, Georgia
13	December 8, 2015	December 23, 2015	Jacksonville Veterans Memorial Arena	Jacksonville, Florida
14	December 13, 2016	December 14, 2016	Verizon Center	Washington, D.C.
15	December 5, 2017	December 14, 2017	Naval Base San Diego	San Diego, California
16	December 4, 2018	December 20, 2018	Fort Hood	Killeen, Texas
17	December 4, 2019	Not televised	Marine Corps Air Station New River; Marine Corps Base Camp Lejeune	Jacksonville, North Carolina
18	December 2, 2020	December 6, 2020	Amway Center	Orlando, Florida
19	October 15, 2021	November 14, 2021	Toyota Arena	Ontario, California
20	November 11, 2022	December 17, 2022	Gainbridge Fieldhouse	Indianapolis, Indiana
21	December 8, 2023	December 8, 2023 (Note: The 2023 edition was held as a live special episode of SmackDown.)	Amica Mutual Pavilion	Providence, Rhode Island
