= List of WWE Raw special episodes =

Special episodes of WWE's professional wrestling television program WWE Raw

This is a list of special episodes of the professional wrestling television series WWE Raw. Throughout its broadcast history, the show has aired episodes that have different themes. Some of them are yearly events such as the WWE draft and the Slammy Awards. Others include tributes to various professional wrestlers who have recently died or retired from actively performing.

== 1990s ==
=== 1993 ===
Date	Episode	Venue	Location	Final match	Rating (millions)	Notes
January 11	Monday Night Raw Premiere	Manhattan Center	New York City, New York	The Undertaker vs. Damien Demento	2.5	
August 23	SummerSlam Spectacular Recap	—N/a	—N/a	—N/a	—N/a	

=== 1994 ===
Date	Episode	Venue	Location	Final match	Rating (millions)	Notes
June 13	Countdown to the Crowning	Erie Civic Center	Erie, Pennsylvania	The Headshrinkers (Fatu and Samu) (c) defeat The Quebecers (Jacques and Pierre) for the WWF Tag Team Championship	—N/a	Taped on May 25.

=== 1995 ===
Date	Episode	Venue	Location	Final match	Rating (millions)	Notes
January 9	Raw's 2nd Anniversary	The Summit	Houston, Texas	Howard Finkel vs. Harvey Wippleman in a Tuxedo match	2.1	Featured a special King's Court hosted by Jerry "The King" Lawler with special guest William Shatner
September 11	Raw's "New Fall Season"	Canton Memorial Civic Center; Titan Towers	Canton, Ohio; Stamford, Connecticut	Shawn Michaels (c) vs. Sid for the WWF Intercontinental Championship	2.7	Originally named "New Look, New Attitude"
October 30	Halloween Raw	Keystone Centre	Brandon, Manitoba, Canada	Razor Ramon (c) vs. Owen Hart for the WWF Intercontinental Championship	2.7	Taped on October 23; The Raw after In Your House 4; The TV debut of Goldust
December 28	The World Wrestling Federation Championship: The Dream, The Reign, The Quest	—N/a	—N/a	—N/a	—N/a	A 30-minute Thursday recap about Bret Hart and the WWF Championship hosted by Vince McMahon and Mr. Perfect.

=== 1996 ===
Date	Episode	Venue	Location	Final match	Rating (millions)	Notes
January 1	The Raw Bowl	Bob Carpenter Center	Newark, Delaware	Diesel vs. Mabel	2.6	Super Bowl theme; Taped on December 18, 1995
September 6	Raw Championship Friday	Wheeling Civic Center	Wheeling, West Virginia	Shawn Michaels (c) vs. Goldust for the WWF Championship	3.4	Taped on August 19

=== 1997 ===
Date	Episode	Venue	Location	Final match	Rating (millions)	Notes
February 3	Royal Rumble Raw	SkyDome	Toronto, Ontario, Canada	The Undertaker and Ahmed Johnson vs. Mankind and Faarooq in a No Holds Barred tag team match	2.6	Taped on January 31; 1st 2-hour Raw
February 13	Thursday Raw Thursday	Lowell Memorial Auditorium	Lowell, Massachusetts	Bret Hart vs. Vader	—N/a	
February 24	ECW Invasion	Manhattan Center	New York City, New York	The Undertaker vs. Faarooq	2.5	
September 22	Raw's Madison Square Garden debut	Madison Square Garden	New York City, New York	Bret Hart vs. Goldust	2.4	
December 29	New Year's Eve Raw	Nassau Coliseum	Uniondale, New York	Shawn Michaels (c) vs. Owen Hart for the WWF Championship	3.6	

=== 1998 ===
Date	Episode	Venue	Location	Final match	Rating (millions)	Notes
January 5	New Year's Raw 1998	New Haven Coliseum	New Haven, Connecticut	The New Age Outlaws (Billy Gunn and Road Dogg) vs. The Headbangers (Mosh and Thrasher)	3.3	Taped on December 30, 1997
September 5	Saturday Night	New Haven Coliseum	New Haven, Connecticut	Jeff Jarrett vs. Scorpio	—N/a	Taped on August 31
September 12	Saturday Night	Tsongas Arena	Lowell, Massachusetts	D-Generation X (Triple H, Billy Gunn, Road Dogg, and X-Pac) vs. Kai En Tai (Dick Togo, Mens Teioh, Sho Funaki, and Taka Michinoku)	—N/a	Taped on September 1
December 28	New Year's Eve Raw	Pepsi Arena	Albany, New York	Road Dogg (c) vs. Mankind for the WWF Hardcore Championship	4.9	

=== 1999 ===
Date	Episode	Venue	Location	Final match	Rating (millions)	Notes
January 4	New Year's Raw	Worcester Centrum	Worcester, Massachusetts	The Rock (c) vs. Mankind in a No Disqualification match for the WWF Championship	5.7	Mankind's WWF Championship victory was infamously spoiled by WCW Monday Nitro, causing it to significantly lose viewers to Raw.
February 13	Raw Saturday Night	SkyDome	Toronto, Ontario, Canada	"Stone Cold" Steve Austin vs. The Corporation (Vince McMahon, Kane, Test, Ken Shamrock, Big Boss Man, and Chyna) in a 6-on-1 Handicap Gauntlet match	5.9	Aired on a Saturday due to USA's coverage of the Westminster Kennel Club Dog Show; 41,432 spectators, the largest attendance in Raw history
May 24	Owen Hart Tribute Show	Kiel Center	St. Louis, Missouri	The Rock vs. Val Venis	7.2	In honor of Owen Hart, who died after a fall accident at Over the Edge.
December 27	New Year's Eve Raw	Greensboro Coliseum	Greensboro, North Carolina	Big Show (c) vs. Triple H for the WWF Championship	5.8	

== 2000s ==
=== 2000 ===
Date	Episode	Venue	Location	Final match	Rating (millions)	Notes
January 3	New Year's Raw	American Airlines Arena	Miami, Florida	The Rock vs. D-Generation X (Billy Gunn, Road Dogg, and X-Pac)	6.4	
September 25	Raw's TNN debut	Bryce Jordan Center	State College, Pennsylvania	The Rock (c) vs. Chris Benoit for the WWF Championship	5.4	

=== 2001 ===
Date	Episode	Venue	Location	Final match	Rating (millions)	Notes
January 1	New Year's Raw	Frank Erwin Center	Austin, Texas	"Stone Cold" Steve Austin vs. William Regal for the final spot in the triple threat match to determine the #1 contender for the WWF Championship	4.55	Taped on December 29, 2000
March 26	The Night of Champions	Gund Arena	Cleveland, Ohio	"Stone Cold" Steve Austin and The Rock vs. The Undertaker and Kane	5.2	The last Raw before WrestleMania X-Seven; The start of the Invasion storyline
December 24	Raw Christmas Eve	American Airlines Arena	Miami, Florida	Chris Jericho (c) vs. The Rock vs. Kurt Angle in a triple threat match for the Undisputed WWF Championship	3.2	Taped on December 21
December 31	Best of the WWF 2001: Viewer's Choice	Titan Towers	Stamford, Connecticut	—N/a	2.4	Recap episode

=== 2002 ===
Date	Episode	Venue	Location	Final match	Rating (millions)	Notes
January 7	New Year's Raw	Madison Square Garden	New York City, New York	The Dudley Boyz (Bubba Ray Dudley and D-Von Dudley) (c) vs. Spike Dudley and Tazz for the WWF World Tag Team Championship	4.9	
March 25	WWE Draft	Bryce Jordan Center	State College, Pennsylvania	Triple H (c) vs. Chris Jericho vs. Stephanie McMahon in a triple threat match for the Undisputed WWF Championship	5.4	The start of the 1st brand extension; Vince McMahon selected for SmackDown! while Ric Flair selected for Raw.
October 7	Raw Roulette	Thomas & Mack Center	Las Vegas, Nevada	Kane (c) vs. Bubba Ray Dudley and Spike Dudley vs. Chris Jericho and Christian vs. Jeff Hardy and Rob Van Dam in a Tables, Ladders, and Chairs match for the World Tag Team Championship	3.8	Match stipulations were decided via a wheel spin.
December 23	Raw's 500th Episode	Ford Center	Oklahoma City, Oklahoma	Jerry "The King" Lawler and Jim Ross vs. William Regal and Lance Storm	3.3	Taped on December 21
December 30	Year In Review Special	Titan Towers	Stamford, Connecticut	—N/a	4.9	Recap episode

=== 2003 ===
Date	Episode	Venue	Location	Final match	Rating (millions)	Notes
January 6	New Year's Raw	America West Arena	Phoenix, Arizona	Kane and Rob Van Dam vs. Chris Jericho and Christian Cage	3.6	
August 4	Final Raw on TNN	PNE Coliseum	Vancouver, British Columbia, Canada	Shane McMahon vs. Eric Bischoff in a No Holds Barred match	4.0	TNN rebranded to Spike TV the following week.
August 11	Raw's Spike TV debut	MARK of the Quad	Moline, Illinois	Ric Flair vs. Goldberg in a No Disqualification match with Randy Orton as the special guest referee	3.9	
November 24	Raw Roulette	E Center	West Valley City, Utah	Shawn Michaels and Chris Jericho vs. Ric Flair and Batista in a Bischoff's Choice tag team match	3.6	Match stipulations were decided via a wheel spin.; Lita vs. Victoria marked the 1st women's Steel Cage match in WWE history.
December 22	Year In Review Special	Titan Towers	Stamford, Connecticut	—N/a	—N/a	Recap episode
December 29	New Year's Eve Raw	SBC Center	San Antonio, Texas	Triple H (c) vs. Shawn Michaels for the World Heavyweight Championship	3.7	

=== 2004 ===
Date	Episode	Venue	Location	Final match	Rating (millions)	Notes
January 5	New Year's Raw	The Pyramid	Memphis, Tennessee	Evolution (Ric Flair and Dave Bautista) (c) vs. The Dudley Boyz (Bubba Ray Dudley and D-Von Dudley) for the World Tag Team Championship	3.5	
March 22	WWE Draft	Joe Louis Arena	Detroit, Michigan	Eddie Guerrero (c) vs. Triple H for the WWE Championship	3.7	2-hour runtime; Multi-brand episode with SmackDown!
September 20	Raw 2004–05 Season Premiere	Tucson Convention Center Arena	Tucson, Arizona	Evolution (Triple H, Ric Flair, and Dave Bautista) vs. Chris Benoit, Randy Orton, and Shelton Benjamin	3.7	
December 20	Year in Review Special	Titan Towers	Stamford, Connecticut	—N/a	—N/a	Recap episode
December 27	New Year's Eve Raw	Mississippi Coast Coliseum	Biloxi, Mississippi	Triple H vs. Shelton Benjamin in a Beat the Clock Challenge	—N/a	

=== 2005 ===
Date	Episode	Venue	Location	Final match	Rating (millions)	Notes
January 3	New Year's Raw	Nassau Coliseum	Uniondale, New York	Randy Orton vs. Triple H	—N/a	
February 7	Raw Live in Japan	Saitama Super Arena	Saitama, Japan	Triple H (c) vs. Edge for the World Heavyweight Championship	3.7	Taped on February 4; The 1st Raw episode held in Japan.
June 6	WWE Draft	Savvis Center	St. Louis, Missouri	Chris Benoit vs. Gene Snitsky in an ECW Rules match	—N/a	1st night of the WWE Draft
June 13	WWE Draft	Broome County Arena	Binghamton, New York	Kane vs. Sylvain Grenier	—N/a	3rd night of the WWE Draft
June 20	WWE Draft	America West Arena	Phoenix, Arizona	Triple H and Kurt Angle vs. Shawn Michaels and Batista	—N/a	5th night of the WWE Draft
June 27	WWE Draft	Arrowhead Pond	Anaheim, California	Shawn Michaels, John Cena, and Hulk Hogan vs. Chris Jericho, Christian, and Tyson Tomko	—N/a	7th night of the WWE Draft
September 26	Final Raw on Spike TV	Heart O' Coliseum	Waco, Texas	Shawn Michaels and John Cena vs. Chris Masters and Carlito	—N/a	
October 3	Raw Homecoming	American Airlines Center	Dallas, Texas	John Cena (c) vs. Eric Bischoff for the WWE Championship	5.6	1st 3-hour episode; Raw's return to USA; The 2005-2006 season premiere
October 31	Raw Halloween	Arrowhead Pond	Anaheim, California	John Cena vs. Shawn Michaels	—N/a	
November 14	Eddie Guerrero Tribute	Target Center	Minneapolis, Minnesota	John Cena vs. Randy Orton	5.3	In honor of Eddie Guerrero who had died the previous weekend.; Taped November 13
December 19	Holiday with the Troops	Bagram Air Base	Bagram, Afghanistan	Shawn Michaels vs. Triple H in a Boot Camp match	4.2	In honor of the United States Armed Forces; Taped December 9

=== 2006 ===
Date	Episode	Venue	Location	Final match	Rating (millions)	Notes
January 2	New Year's Raw	Continental Airlines Arena	East Rutherford, New Jersey	John Cena vs. Kurt Angle in a First Blood match	—N/a	
February 16	Thursday Night Raw	Greensboro, North Carolina	Greensboro Coliseum	John Cena (c) vs. Edge for the WWE Championship	—N/a	Taped on February 13
April 3	WrestleMania 22 Fallout	Allstate Arena	Rosemont, Illinois	John Cena (c) vs. Edge and Triple H in a 2-on-1 Handicap match	4.1	The Raw after WrestleMania 22
May 29	WWE Draft	Tacoma Dome	Tacoma, Washington	Triple H vs. Kenny	—N/a	
October 9	Family Reunion	Colonial Center	Columbia, South Carolina	John Cena vs. The Undertaker	5.0	2006–07 season premiere; Multi-brand episode with SmackDown and ECW
October 23	Raw's 700th Episode	Allstate Arena	Rosemont, Illinois	Randy Orton vs. Triple H	—N/a	
December 18	Raw 3-Hour Special	Verizon Center	Washington, D.C.	D-Generation X (Shawn Michaels and Triple H) and John Cena vs. Rated-RKO (Edge and Randy Orton) and Umaga	—N/a	
December 25	Tribute to the Troops	Camp Victory	Baghdad, Iraq	Randy Orton vs. Carlito	4.1	In honor of the United States Armed Forces; Taped on December 7

=== 2007 ===
Date	Episode	Venue	Location	Final match	Rating (millions)	Notes
January 1	New Year's Raw	American Airlines Arena	Miami, Florida	John Cena vs. Umaga, Johnny Nitro, Jonathan Coachman, and Armando Estrada	—N/a	
February 15	Raw Thursday	Rose Garden	Portland, Oregon	John Cena, Shawn Michaels, The Undertaker, and Batista vs. Rated-RKO (Edge and Randy Orton), Mr. Kennedy, and Montel Vontavious Porter	—N/a	Taped on February 12
June 11	WWE Draft (Night 1)	Wachovia Arena	Wilkes-Barre, Pennsylvania	Team Raw (Randy Orton, Johnny Nitro, Eugene, Kenny Dykstra, and Viscera) vs. Team ECW (Tommy Dreamer, The Sandman, Matt Striker, Kevin Thorn, and Marcus Cor Von) vs. Team SmackDown (William Regal, Matt Hardy, Mark Henry, Chavo Guerrero, and Chris Masters) in a 15-man triple threat tag team battle royal to earn 2 draft picks for their respective brand	4.5	
June 25	Chris Benoit Tribute	American Bank Center	Corpus Christi, Texas	—N/a	3.8	3-hour memorial for Chris Benoit and his family; A kayfabe memorial for the Mr. McMahon character was originally planned. It was postponed but the circumstances related to their deaths were unknown at the time.; Replaced with a recap show internationally and on the WWE Network.
December 10	Raw 15th Anniversary	Arena At Harbor Yard	Bridgeport, Connecticut	Mr. Kennedy vs. Marty Jannetty	4.7	
December 24	Tribute to the Troops	Camp Victory	Baghdad, Iraq	D-Generation X (Shawn Michaels and Triple H) defeat Mr. Kennedy and Umaga	4.0	In honor of the United States Armed Forces

=== 2008 ===
Date	Episode	Venue	Location	Final match	Rating (millions)	Notes
January 7	Raw Roulette	Mohegan Sun Arena	Uncasville, Connecticut	Jeff Hardy vs. Umaga in a Steel Cage match	3.2	Multi-brand episode with SmackDown! and ECW; Match stipulations were decided via a wheel spin.
January 21	Raw In HD	Hampton Coliseum	Hampton, Virginia	Mark Henry vs. Snitsky vs. Triple H vs. William Regal in a Battle Royal Gauntlet match	—N/a	The 1st Raw episode in HD
March 10	WrestleMania Rewind	Bradley Center	Milwaukee, Wisconsin	John Cena vs. Shawn Michaels	3.6	3-hour runtime; Multi-brand episode with SmackDown! and ECW; Featured WrestleMania rematches
April 21	King of the Ring	BI-LO Center	Greenville, South Carolina	John Cena, Triple H, The Undertaker, and Kane vs. Randy Orton, Edge, John "Bradshaw" Layfield, and Chavo Guerrero	3.0	Multi-brand episode with SmackDown! and ECW
June 23	WWE Draft	AT&T Center	San Antonio, Texas	Team Raw (John Cena, Triple H, Batista, CM Punk, and Kane) vs. Team SmackDown (Edge, Jeff Hardy, Big Show, The Great Khali, and Montel Vontavious Porter) vs. Team ECW (Matt Hardy, The Miz, Chavo Guerrero, John Morrison, and Shelton Benjamin) in a 15-man triple threat tag team battle royal	3.4	
August 25	Raw on Sci Fi	Wachovia Center	Wilkes-Barre, Pennsylvania	Batista vs Kane	—N/a	
November 3	Raw's 800th Episode Celebration	St. Pete Times Forum	Tampa, Florida	Batista (c) vs. Chris Jericho in a Steel Cage match for the World Heavyweight Championship	3.4	The 800th Raw episode
December 8	2008 Slammy Awards	Wachovia Center	Philadelphia, Pennsylvania	John Cena vs. Edge	3.2	

=== 2009 ===
Date	Episode	Venue	Location	Final match	Rating (millions)	Notes
January 5	New Year's Raw	New Orleans Arena	New Orleans, Louisiana	John Cena and Shawn Michaels vs. Randy Orton and Chris Jericho	—N/a	
April 13	WWE Draft	Philips Arena	Atlanta, Georgia	Triple H, Batista, and Shane McMahon vs. Cody Rhodes and Ted Dibiase in a 3-on-2 Handicap match	3.7	
June 15	Three For All	Time Warner Cable Arena	Charlotte, North Carolina	10-man battle royal to determine the #1 contender for the WWE Championship	3.6	
June 22	Trump Raw	Resch Center	Green Bay, Wisconsin	John Cena vs. Big Show	4.4	Commercial-free episode; Hosted by Donald Trump
September 7	The Price Is Raw	Allstate Arena	Rosemont, Illinois	D-Generation X (Triple H and Shawn Michaels) vs. Randy Orton and Chris Masters	—N/a	Hosted by Bob Barker
November 23	A Raw Thanksgiving	Giant Center	Hershey, Pennsylvania	8-man Breakthrough Battle Royal to determine the #1 contender for the WWE Championship	3.3	3-hour runtime; Multi-brand episode with SmackDown; Hosted by Jesse Ventura
December 14	Slammy Awards	American Bank Center	Corpus Christi, Texas	John Cena vs. Randy Orton in the final of the 2009 Superstar of the Year Tournament	3.3	3-hour runtime; Multi-brand episode with SmackDown; Special appearance by Dennis Miller

== 2010s ==
=== 2010 ===
Date	Episode	Venue	Location	Final match	Rating (millions)	Notes
January 4	New Year's Raw	Nutter Center	Dayton, Ohio	Kofi Kingston vs. Randy Orton	—N/a	Bret Hart returned for the first time in 12 years.
March 15	WrestleMania Recap	San Diego Sports Arena	San Diego, California	Kofi Kingston vs. Batista	3.7	Composed of rematches from past WrestleManias; Special appearance by "Stone Cold" Steve Austin
April 19	Monday Night SmackDown	IZOD Center	East Rutherford, New Jersey	Triple H, Edge, and Rey Mysterio vs. Chris Jericho, CM Punk, and Luke Gallows	3.1	Due to the air travel disruption after the 2010 Eyjafjallajökull eruption, most of the Raw roster remained in Belfast and was replaced by the SmackDown roster.; Special appearances by MacGruber's Will Forte, Kristen Wiig and Ryan Phillippe
April 26	WWE Draft	Richmond Coliseum	Richmond, Virginia	Batista vs. Randy Orton vs. Sheamus in a Triple threat match to determine the #1 contender for the WWE Championship	3.1	3-hour runtime; Multi-brand episode with SmackDown; SmackDown General Manager Theodore Long and John Cena took over authoritative duties.
May 17	Commercial-Free Raw	Air Canada Centre	Toronto, Ontario, Canada	John Cena vs. Sheamus	3.4	The 2nd commercial-free Raw; Special appearance by Buzz Aldrin
June 7	Viewer's Choice	American Airlines Arena	Miami, Florida	John Cena vs. CM Punk	3.1	Multi-brand episode with SmackDown≤; Match selections were voted on WWE.com.; Special appearances by the A-Team's Quinton "Rampage" Jackson and Sharlto Copley; Debut of The Nexus
August 30	Raw's 900th Episode	TD Garden	Boston, Massachusetts	Team Raw (John Cena, Randy Orton, Edge, Chris Jericho, and Sheamus) vs. The Nexus (Wade Barrett, Justin Gabriel, Heath Slater, David Otunga, and Michael Tarver) in a 10-man tag team elimination match	3.5	
September 13	Raw Roulette	U.S. Bank Arena	Cincinnati, Ohio	John Cena vs. Randy Orton in a Tables match	3.0	Multi-brand episode with SmackDown; Match stipulations were decided via a wheel spin.; Special appearance by Chad Johnson
November 15	Old School Raw	Giant Center	Hershey, Pennsylvania	Daniel Bryan vs. Jack Swagger	3.05	3-hour runtime; Special appearances by WWE legends; Supposed to temporarily revert to the 1993 Raw format. However, while some items from 1993 were used, such as the ring and the theme music, it used the 1980s-era WWF opening as well as the 1997 stage setup.
November 29	King of the Ring	Wells Fargo Center	Philadelphia, Pennsylvania	The Miz (c) vs. Jerry "The King" Lawler in a Tables, Ladders, and Chairs match for the WWE Championship	3.1	3-hour runtime; Multi-brand episode with SmackDown; Special appearance by Rima Fakih
December 13	Slammy Awards	New Orleans Arena	New Orleans, Louisiana	John Cena vs. David Otunga	3.06	Hosted by David Arquette; Multi-brand episode with SmackDown

=== 2011 ===
Date	Episode	Venue	Location	Final match	Rating (millions)	Notes
January 3	New Year's Raw	US Airways Center	Phoenix, Arizona	King Sheamus vs. Randy Orton vs. Wade Barrett in a Triple threat steel cage match to determine the #1 contender for the WWE Championship	—N/a	
April 25	WWE Draft	PNC Arena	Raleigh, North Carolina	John Cena, Christian, and Mark Henry vs. The Miz, CM Punk, and Alberto Del Rio	3.4	Booker T served as an alternate color commentator.
May 2	The Rock's Birthday Bash	American Airlines Arena	Miami, Florida	Kane vs. Mason Ryan	3.4	Special appearances by Mýa and Pitbull
June 13	WWE All Star Night	Nassau Veterans Memorial Coliseum	Uniondale, New York	CM Punk vs. John Cena	3.1	3-hour runtime; Multi-brand episode with SmackDown; "Stone Cold" Steve Austin served as the guest general manager.
June 20	Power to the People	Baltimore Arena	Baltimore, Maryland	John Cena, Randy Orton, and Alex Riley vs. Christian, The Miz, and R-Truth	3.1	3-hour runtime; Multi-brand episode with SmackDown; Matches were selected by fans via mobile votes.
June 27	Raw Roulette	Thomas & Mack Center	Las Vegas, Nevada	John Cena vs. R-Truth in a Tables match	3.1	Multi-brand episode with SmackDown; Match stipulations were decided via a wheel spin.; Special appearance by Shawn Michaels; CM Punk made his iconic pipebomb speech.
August 29	Raw SuperShow	BOK Center	Tulsa, Oklahoma	John Cena and Sheamus vs Christian and Mark Henry	—N/a	The first Raw under the "Raw SuperShow" title, following the initial discontinuation of the WWE brand split.
October 31	Raw Halloween	Philips Arena	Atlanta, Georgia	John Cena vs. The Miz	—N/a	Guest hosted by The Muppets.
November 14	Raw Gets Rocked	TD Garden	Boston, Massachusetts	Wade Barrett vs Randy Orton	3.2	3-hour runtime; Special appearances by The Rock 'n' Sock Connection, their 1st appearance together since 2004.
December 12	Slammy Awards	Norfolk Scope	Norfolk, Virginia	John Cena vs. Mark Henry	2.8	3-hour runtime; Kane returned, wearing his mask for the first time since 2003.

=== 2012 ===
Date	Episode	Venue	Location	Final match	Rating (millions)	Notes
April 23	Raw SuperShow	Joe Louis Arena	Detroit, Michigan	Dolph Ziggler and Jack Swagger vs. Brodus Clay and Hornswoggle	4.39/3.04 share	3-hour runtime
July 23	Raw 1000	Scottrade Center	St. Louis, Missouri	CM Punk (c) vs. John Cena for the WWE Championship	6.01/3.84 share	The 1,000th Raw episode; Marked the start of Raw's permanent 3-hour format.; Unveiled the new Raw logo.; Charlie Sheen made a special appearance via Skype.
August 6	Shawn Michaels Appreciation Night	AT&T Center	San Antonio, Texas	John Cena vs. Daniel Bryan	4.7/3.54 share	
December 17	Slammy Awards	Wells Fargo Center	Philadelphia, Pennsylvania	John Cena and Vickie Guerrero vs. Dolph Ziggler and AJ Lee in a Mixed tag team match	4.23/2.89 share	
December 24	Raw Christmas Eve	CONSOL Energy Center	Pittsburgh, Pennsylvania	John Cena vs. Alberto del Rio in a Miracle on 34th Street Fight	2.2	Mick Foley, dressed up as Santa Claus, got run over by Alberto Del Rio. Foley interfered in Del Rio's match later that night.
December 31	Champion's Choice Night	Verizon Center	Washington, D.C.	Kofi Kingston (c) vs. Wade Barrett for the WWE Intercontinental Championship	3.5	Every title, except the WWE Championship, was on the line and the champions got to choose their opponent(s).

=== 2013 ===
Date	Episode	Venue	Location	Final match	Rating (millions)	Notes
January 14	Raw 20th Anniversary	Toyota Center	Houston, Texas	John Cena vs. Dolph Ziggler in a Steel Cage match	4.55/3.1 share	Jim Ross commentated in the main event.
January 28	Raw Roulette	Thomas & Mack Center	Las Vegas, Nevada	Team Hell No (Daniel Bryan and Kane vs. Dolph Ziggler and Chris Jericho	5.02/3.67 share	Match stipulations were chosen via a wheel spin.
March 4	Old School Raw	KeyBank Center	Buffalo, New York	Big Show vs. CM Punk vs. Randy Orton vs. Sheamus in a Fatal 4-way match	5.02/3.55 share	Appearances by WWE legends.; Used the Attitude Era theme song from the War Zone segment during backstage segments; Used a modified 1980's WWF logo without the "F", a result of the WWF trademark dispute.
April 8	WrestleMania 29 Raw	IZOD Center	East Rutherford, New Jersey	John Cena vs. Mark Henry	3.4	The Raw after WrestleMania 29
May 27	Bret Hart Appreciation Night	Scotiabank Saddledome	Calgary, Alberta	John Cena vs. Curtis Axel	3.94/1.4 share	
November 18	Raw Country	Bridgestone Arena	Nashville, Tennessee	CM Punk, Daniel Bryan, Cody Rhodes, Goldust, and The Usos (Jey Uso and Jimmy Uso) vs. The Shield (Dean Ambrose, Roman Reigns, and Seth Rollins) and The Wyatt Family (Bray Wyatt, Luke Harper, and Erick Rowan)	3.80/1.4 share	Florida Georgia Line had a live performance.
December 9	Slammy Awards	Key Arena	Seattle, Washington	Natalya vs. Tamina	4.15/1.5 share	
December 23	Raw Christmas	Frank Erwin Center	Austin, Texas	John Cena, CM Punk, and Big E Langston vs. The Shield (Dean Ambrose, Roman Reigns, and Seth Rollins)	5.2	

=== 2014 ===
Date	Episode	Venue	Location	Final match	Rating (millions)	Notes
January 6	Old School Raw	Baltimore Arena	Baltimore, Maryland	CM Punk vs. Roman Reigns	4.54/1.6 share	Jake "The Snake" Roberts made his first appearance since 2005.
March 10	Occupy Raw	FedExForum	Memphis, Tennessee	Daniel Bryan and Big Show vs. Randy Orton and Batista	4.73/1.5 share	Featured the "Occupy Raw Movement".
June 23	Raw 1100	Verizon Center	Washington, D.C.	John Cena, Roman Reigns, and Sheamus vs. Randy Orton, Bray Wyatt, Alberto Del Rio, and Cesaro in a 4-on-3 Handicap match	4.03/1.4 share	The 1,100th Raw episode
August 11	Hulk Hogan's 61st Birthday Celebration	Portland, Oregon	Moda Center	Sheamus vs. Randy Orton	4.30/1.5 share	
August 25	WWE Hall of Fame Forum	Honda Center	Anaheim, California	John Cena, Big Show, and Mark Henry vs. The Wyatt Family (Bray Wyatt, Luke Harper, and Erick Rowan)	3.98/1.3 share	
September 8	Raw 2014–15 Season Premiere	Baltimore Arena	Baltimore, Maryland	Roman Reigns vs. Randy Orton	3.98/1.4 share	
December 8	Slammy Awards	Bon Secours Wellness Arena	Greenville, South Carolina	John Cena vs. Big Show	2.66/1.3 share	Hosted by Seth Green
December 22	Raw Christmas	Target Center	Minneapolis, Minnesota	Dean Ambrose vs. Bray Wyatt in a Miracle on 34th Street Fight	3.63/1.3 share	Hulk Hogan (as "Ho Ho Hogan") was the general manager.
December 29	New Year's Raw	Verizon Center	Washington, D.C.	The Miz and Damien Mizdow vs. The Ascension (Konnor and Viktor)	3.61/2.2 share	Edge and Christian were the general managers.; Marked the return of The Authority after they were removed from power at Survivor Series.

=== 2015 ===
Date	Episode	Venue	Location	Final match	Rating (millions)	Notes
January 5	John Cena Appreciation Night	American Bank Center	Corpus Christi, Texas	Big E vs. Adam Rose	3.67/1.3 share	
January 19	Raw Reunion	American Airlines Center	Dallas, Texas	The Authority (Seth Rollins, Kane, and Big Show) vs. John Cena in a 3-on-1 Handicap match	4.10/1.4 share	Featured appearances by Hulk Hogan, D-Generation X, Ric Flair, The APA, and Sting.
January 26	Raw Special in Studio Show	Titan Towers	Stamford, Connecticut	—N/a	4.42/1.4 share	Due to a blizzard across Connecticut, a SmackDown taping was cancelled and Raw was rescheduled for the ensuing SmackDown.
April 27	King of the Ring (Night 1)	Resch Center	Green Bay, Wisconsin	Randy Orton and Roman Reigns vs. The Authority (Seth Rollins and Kane)	3.76/1.2 share	
September 14	Raw 2015–16 Season Premiere	FedExForum	Memphis, Tennessee	John Cena and Sting vs. Seth Rollins and Big Show	2.42	
December 21	Slammy Awards	Target Center	Minneapolis, Minnesota	Dean Ambrose vs. Sheamus in a Steel Cage match	3.50	

=== 2016 ===
Date	Episode	Venue	Location	Final match	Rating (millions)	Notes
January 11	Raw's 23rd Birthday	Smoothie King Center	New Orleans, Louisiana	Roman Reigns vs. Alberto Del Rio, Kevin Owens, Sheamus, Stardust, The Ascension (Konnor and Viktor), The New Day (Big E, Kofi Kingston, and Xavier Woods), The Wyatt Family (Bray Wyatt, Luke Harper, Erick Rowan, and Braun Strowman) and Tyler Breeze in a 14-on-1 Handicap match	3.3	
February 8	Thank You, Daniel Bryan!	KeyArena	Seattle, Washington	The Dudley Boyz (Bubba Ray Dudley and D-Von Dudley) and The Usos (Jey Uso and Jimmy Uso) defeat Mark Henry and The New Day (Big E, Kofi Kingston, and Xavier Woods)	2.65	In honor of Daniel Bryan after his retirement
May 23	Raw 1200	Royal Farms Arena	Baltimore, Maryland	AJ Styles vs. Kevin Owens for a spot in the Money in the Bank ladder match	1.12	The 1,200th Raw episode
October 31	Raw Halloween	XL Center	Hartford, Connecticut	Roman Reigns (c) vs. Chris Jericho for the WWE United States Championship	1.88	

=== 2017 ===
Date	Episode	Venue	Location	Final match	Rating (millions)	Notes
April 10	Superstar Shake-up (Night 1)	Nassau Veterans Memorial Coliseum	Uniondale, New York	Dean Ambrose vs. Kevin Owens	3.42	
December 25	Raw Christmas	Allstate Arena	Rosemont, Illinois	The Bar (Cesaro and Sheamus) (c) vs. Seth Rollins and Jason Jordan for the WWE Raw Tag Team Championship	0.83	

=== 2018 ===
Date	Episode	Venue	Location	Final match	Rating (millions)	Notes
January 1	Raw New Year's Day	American Airlines Arena	Miami, Florida	Finn Bálor and The Club (Karl Anderson and Luke Gallows) vs. Elias and The Miztourage (Bo Dallas and Curtis Axel)	1.07	
January 22	Raw 25th Anniversary	Brooklyn, New York	Barclays Center	Heath Slater and Rhyno vs. Titus Worldwide (Titus O'Neil and Apollo Crews)	4.53	Simulcast from the two venues.
January 22	Raw 25th Anniversary	New York City, New York	Manhattan Center	Bálor Club (Karl Anderson and Luke Gallows) vs. The Revival (Dash Wilder and Scott Dawson)	4.53	Simulcast from the two venues.
April 16	Superstar Shake-up (Night 1)	XL Center	Hartford, Connecticut	Seth Rollins, Braun Strowman, Finn Bálor, Bobby Lashley, and Bobby Roode vs. Kevin Owens, Sami Zayn, The Miz, and The Miztourage (Bo Dallas and Curtis Axel)	3.62	
April 23	Raw 1300	Scottrade Center	St. Louis, Missouri	Alexa Bliss, Mickie James, and The Riott Squad (Liv Morgan, Ruby Riott, and Sarah Logan) vs. Bayley, Sasha Banks, Nia Jax, Ember Moon, and Natalya	3.1	The 1,300th Raw episode
December 24	Christmas Eve Raw	Golden 1 Center	Sacramento, California	Seth Rollins vs. Baron Corbin	1.7	Taped on December 17
December 31	New Year's Eve Raw	Little Caesars Arena	Detroit, Michigan	Natalya and Ronda Rousey vs. Nia Jax and Tamina	1.9	Taped on December 28

=== 2019 ===
Date	Episode	Venue	Location	Final match	Rating (millions)	Notes
February 25	Ric Flair's 70th Birthday Celebration	State Farm Arena	Atlanta, Georgia	Bayley vs. Nia Jax	2.9	Featured appearances by Sting, Batista, Triple H, and Shawn Michaels
April 15	Superstar Shake-up (Night 1)	Bell Centre	Montreal, Quebec, Canada	AJ Styles, Roman Reigns, and Seth Rollins vs. Baron Corbin, Bobby Lashley, and Drew McIntyre	2.66	
July 22	Raw Reunion	Amalie Arena	Tampa, Florida	Braun Strowman vs. Randy Row	3.09	Featured appearances by John Cena, Hulk Hogan, Booker T, Torrie Wilson, Christian, Kelly Kelly, Kurt Angle, Rob Van Dam, Ric Flair, The Kliq, Mick Foley, Stone Cold Steve Austin, and other WWE legends.
August 19	King of the Ring (Night 1)	Xcel Energy Center	Saint Paul, Minnesota	The O.C. (Karl Anderson and Luke Gallows) (c) vs. Braun Strowman and Seth Rollins for the WWE Raw Tag Team Championship	2.53	The 1st night of the return of the King of the Ring tournament, last held in 2015.
September 9	Raw's Return to Madison Square Garden	Madison Square Garden	New York, New York	Seth Rollins, Braun Strowman, Cedric Alexander, and The Viking Raiders (Erik and Ivar) vs. Dolph Ziggler, Robert Roode, and The O.C. (AJ Styles, Karl Anderson, and Luke Gallows)	2.13	First televised WWE event at Madison Square Garden in 10 years.; Featured an appearance by "Stone Cold" Steve Austin.
September 23	Raw 2018–19 Season Finale	Chase Center	San Francisco, California	Braun Strowman vs. Seth Rollins	2.24	
September 30	Raw 2019–20 Season Premiere	Talking Stick Resort Arena	Phoenix, Arizona	Seth Rollins (c) vs. Rusev for the WWE Universal Championship	2.56	Debuted a new logo and "Legendary" by Skillet) as the new theme song.
October 14	WWE Draft (Night 2)	Pepsi Center	Denver, Colorado	The Kabuki Warriors (Asuka and Kairi Sane) vs. Lacey Evans and Natalya	2.27	

== 2020s ==
=== 2020 ===
Date	Episode	Venue	Location	Final match	Rating (millions)	Notes
January 27	Edge Appreciation Night	AT&T Center	San Antonio, Texas	Erick Rowan vs. Branden Vice	2.40	Edge returned to the ring the previous night for the 1st time in 9 years.
March 16	3:16 Day	WWE Performance Center	Orlando, Florida	Andrade vs. Rey Mysterio	2.33	Featured an appearance by Stone Cold Steve Austin.; Marked the first Raw held behind closed doors at the WWE Performance Center due to the COVID-19 lockdowns.
March 23	Raw 1400	WWE Performance Center	Orlando, Florida	Aleister Black vs. Leon Ruff	2.0	Marked Raw's 1,400th episode.
June 22	Championship Monday	WWE Performance Center	Orlando, Florida	Apollo Crews vs. Shelton Benjamin	1.92	
September 14	In Your Face	Amway Center	Orlando, Florida	Drew McIntyre vs. Keith Lee	1.69	
October 12	WWE Draft (Night 2)	Amway Center	Orlando, Florida	14-woman battle royal to determine the #1 contender for the WWE Raw Women's Championship	1.85	
October 19	Raw 2020–21 Season Premiere	Amway Center	Orlando, Florida	Braun Strowman vs. Keith Lee	1.77	

=== 2021 ===
Date	Episode	Venue	Location	Final match	Rating (millions)	Notes
January 4	Legends Night	Tropicana Field	St. Petersburg, Florida	Drew McIntyre vs. Keith Lee for the WWE Championship	2.13	Featured appearances by Hulk Hogan, Ric Flair, Mickie James, Torrie Wilson, Booker T, Goldberg, and other WWE legends.
October 4	WWE Draft (Night 2)	Bridgestone Arena	Nashville, Tennessee	Bianca Belair vs. Charlotte Flair	1.86	
October 25	Raw 2021–22 Season Premiere	Toyota Center	Houston, Texas	Finn Bálor vs. Kevin Owens vs. Rey Mysterio vs. Seth Rollins in a Fatal 4-way ladder match to determine the #1 contender for the WWE Championship	1.65	

=== 2022 ===
Date	Episode	Venue	Location	Final match	Rating (millions)	Notes
February 21	Raw 1500	Colonial Life Arena	Columbia, South Carolina	RK-Bro (Randy Orton and Riddle) vs. Kevin Owens and Seth Rollins	1.825	Marked the 1,500th Raw episode.
March 28	WrestleMania Raw	PPG Paints Arena	Pittsburgh, Pennsylvania	RK-Bro (Randy Orton and Riddle) vs. Austin Theory and Seth Rollins	1.979	The last Raw before WrestleMania 38.
April 4	WrestleMania Fallout	American Airlines Center	Dallas, Texas	The Street Profits (Angelo Dawkins and Montez Ford) vs. Alpha Academy (Chad Gable and Otis) in a Texas Tornado tag team match	—N/a	The Raw after WrestleMania 38.
April 25	Randy Orton 20th Anniversary Celebration	Thompson–Boling Arena	Knoxville, Tennessee	Cody Rhodes, Ezekiel, and RK-Bro (Randy Orton and Riddle) vs. Kevin Owens, Seth Rollins, and The Usos (Jey Uso and Jimmy Uso)	1.613	
June 27	John Cena 20th Anniversary Celebration	Sames Auto Arena	Laredo, Texas	Becky Lynch vs. Doudrop vs. Nikki ASH vs. Shayna Baszler vs. Tamina vs. Xia Li in a Six-pack elimination match for the last spot in the Women's Money in the Bank ladder match	1.951	
July 25	Rey Mysterio 20th Anniversary Celebration	New York City, New York	Madison Square Garden	The Bloodline (Roman Reigns, Jey Uso, and Jimmy Uso) vs. Riddle and The Street Profits (Angelo Dawkins and Montez Ford)	1.901	Raw's return to Madison Square Garden.; The 1st Raw after Vince McMahon's retirement.; The last Raw before SummerSlam.
August 29	Kurt Angle Appreciation Night	PPG Paints Arena	Pittsburgh, Pennsylvania	Aliyah and Raquel Rodriguez vs. Dakota Kai and Iyo Sky for the vacant WWE Women's Tag Team Championship	2.107	Kurt Angle's return to Pittsburgh, his hometown.
October 10	Raw 2022–23 Season Premiere	Barclays Center	Brooklyn, New York	Matt Riddle vs. Sami Zayn	1.824	Featured an appearance by D-Generation X for their 25th anniversary.; The Raw after Extreme Rules.
October 31	Raw Halloween	American Airlines Center	Dallas, Texas	Damage CTRL (Dakota Kai and Iyo Sky) (c) vs. Alexa Bliss and Asuka for the WWE Women's Tag Team Championship	1.500	The last Raw before Crown Jewel.
November 28	First Hour Commercial-Free	Norfolk Scope	Norfolk, Virginia	Jey Uso vs. Kevin Owens	1.668	The 1st hour was commercial-free.; The raw after Survivor Series: WarGames.
December 26	The Absolute Best of 2022	Titan Towers	Stamford, Connecticut	—N/a	1.075	A taped recap episode hosted by Jackie Redmond and Corey Graves.

=== 2023 ===
Date	Episode	Venue	Location	Final match	Rating (millions)	Notes
January 23	Raw Is XXX	Wells Fargo Center	Philadelphia, Pennsylvania	Austin Theory (c) vs. Bobby Lashley in a No Disqualification match for the WWE United States Championship	2.344	Raw's 30th anniversary; Special appearances by WWE legends, including The Undertaker, Hulk Hogan, Triple H, Shawn Michaels, and Brock Lesnar.; The 1st hour was commercial-free.
March 6	John Cena Returns Home	TD Garden	Boston, Massachusetts	Jimmy Uso vs. Sami Zayn	1.827	
March 27	WrestleMania Raw	Footprint Center	Phoenix, Arizona	Cody Rhodes vs. Solo Sikoa	1.843	The final Raw before WrestleMania 39
April 3	WrestleMania Fallout	Crypto.com Arena	Los Angeles, California	Damage CTRL (Dakota Kai and Iyo Sky) vs. Liv Morgan and Raquel Rodriguez	1.843	The Raw after WrestleMania 39
May 1	WWE Draft (Night 2)	Dickies Arena	Fort Worth, Texas	Seth Rollins vs. Solo Sikoa	1.778	
October 16	Raw 2023–24 Season Premiere	Paycom Center	Oklahoma City, Oklahoma	Cody Rhodes and Jey Uso (c) vs. The Judgment Day (Damian Priest and Finn Bálor) for the Undisputed WWE Tag Team Championship	1.483	
October 30	Raw Halloween	Bon Secours Wellness Arena	Greenville, South Carolina	Damian Priest vs. Sami Zayn	1.391	
November 27	First Hour Commercial-Free	Bridgestone Arena	Nashville, Tennessee	Dominik Mysterio vs. Randy Orton	1.884	The 1st hour was commercial-free.; The 1st TV appearances of CM Punk and Randy Orton since January 2014 and May 2022, respectively.; The Raw after Survivor Series: WarGames
December 25	The Absolute Best of 2023	WWE Headquarters	Stamford, Connecticut	—N/a	0.698	A taped recap episode hosted by Jackie Redmond and Peter Rosenberg.

=== 2024 ===
Date	Episode	Venue	Location	Final match	Rating (millions)	Notes
January 1	Day 1	Pechanga Arena	San Diego, California	Seth Rollins (c) vs. Drew McIntyre for the World Heavyweight Championship	1.751	Featured The Rock's first Raw appearance in 8 years.
January 22	Raw 1600	New Orleans, Louisiana	Smoothie King Center	Drew McIntyre vs. Damian Priest	1.686	The 1600th Raw episode
April 1	WrestleMania Raw	Barclays Center	Brooklyn, New York	Seth Rollins vs. Solo Sikoa in a Bloodline Rules match	1.784	The last Raw before WrestleMania XL
April 8	WrestleMania Fallout	Wells Fargo Center	Philadelphia, Pennsylvania	Bronson Reed vs. Drew McIntyre vs. Jey Uso vs. Ricochet in a Fatal 4-way match to determine the #1 contender for the World Heavyweight Championship	2.362	The Raw after WrestleMania XL; The Rock, John Cena, and Triple H made special appearances.; The 1st hour was commercial-free.
April 29	WWE Draft (Night 2)	T-Mobile Center	Kansas City, Missouri	The Judgment Day (Damian Priest, Finn Bálor, and JD McDonagh) vs. Andrade, Jey Uso, and Ricochet	1.683	
August 5	First Hour Commercial-Free	CFG Bank Arena	Baltimore, Maryland	The Wyatt Sicks (Dexter Lumis, Joe Gacy, and Erick Rowan) vs. American Made (Chad Gable, Brutus Creed, and Julius Creed)	1.724	The Raw after SummerSlam
September 9	Raw 2024–25 Season Premiere	Scotiabank Saddledome	Calgary, Alberta, Canada	Braun Strowman vs. Ilja Dragunov vs. Jey Uso vs. Pete Dunne in a Fatal 4-way match in the final of the WWE Intercontinental Championship #1 Contender's Tournament	1.430	Special appearance by Bret Hart; The 1st hour was commercial-free.
October 7	Raw returns to 2 hours	Enterprise Center	St. Louis, Missouri	Gunther (c) vs. Sami Zayn for the World Heavyweight Championship	1.545	Raw's first 2-hour episode since July 16, 2012.; The Raw after Bad Blood
November 4	Raw in Saudi Arabia	Mohammed Abdo Arena	Riyadh, Saudi Arabia	Damian Priest vs. Dominik Mysterio vs. Seth Rollins vs. Sheamus in a Fatal 4-way match to determine the #1 contender for the World Heavyweight Championship	1.465	1st Raw episode in Saudi Arabia; Taped on November 3 after Crown Jewel.
December 2	First Half-Hour Commercial-Free	Angel of the Winds Arena	Everett, Washington	Sami Zayn vs. Seth Rollins	1.709	The 1st 30 minutes were commercial-free.; The Raw after Survivor Series: WarGames
December 30	Final Raw on USA	Houston, Texas	Toyota Center	Iyo Sky vs. Lyra Valkyria in the semifinals of the inaugural WWE Women's Intercontinental Championship Tournament	1.596	The 1st 30 minutes were commercial-free.

=== 2025 ===
Date	Episode	Venue	Location	Final match	Rating (millions)	Notes
January 6	Raw premiere on Netflix	Intuit Dome	Inglewood, California	CM Punk vs. Seth "Freakin" Rollins	Global: 4.900	For the 1st time, the show had a flexible runtime.
January 6	Raw premiere on Netflix	Intuit Dome	Inglewood, California	CM Punk vs. Seth "Freakin" Rollins	US: 2.600	For the 1st time, the show had a flexible runtime.
April 14	WrestleMania Raw	Golden 1 Center	Sacramento, California	Finn Bálor vs. Penta	—N/a	The last Raw before WrestleMania 41
April 21	WrestleMania Fallout	T-Mobile Arena	Paradise, Nevada	Dominik Mysterio vs. Penta for the WWE Intercontinental Championship	—N/a	The Raw after WrestleMania 41
November 17	John Cena's Final Raw	Madison Square Garden	New York City	Gunther vs. Je'Von Evans in the 1st Round of The Last Time Is Now Tournament	—N/a	Featured the appearances of Dolph Ziggler, Gunther, AJ Lee, Brock Lesnar, and Roman Reigns
December 22	Raw 1700	Van Andel Arena	Grand Rapids, Michigan	CM Punk and Rey Mysterio vs. Austin Theory and Bronson Reed	—N/a	The 1,700th Raw episode; Taped On December 19

=== 2026 ===
Date	Episode	Venue	Location	Final match	Rating (millions)	Notes
January 5	Raw on Netflix Anniversary Show	Barclays Center	Brooklyn, New York	CM Punk (c) vs. Bron Breakker for the World Heavyweight Championship	—N/a	1-year anniversary of Raw on Netflix; Stranger Things theme
January 12	Raw Düsseldorf	PSD Bank Dome	Düsseldorf, Germany	AJ Styles vs. Gunther	—N/a	
January 19	Raw Belfast	SSE Arena	Belfast, Northern Ireland	CM Punk (c) vs. Finn Bálor for the World Heavyweight Championship	—N/a	
February 23	AJ Styles Tribute Show	State Farm Arena	Atlanta, Georgia	Raquel Rodriguez vs. Kairi Sane vs. Iyo Sky in a triple threat match to qualifying for Elimination Chamber	—N/a	Styles announces retirement; The Undertaker had a special appearance who announced that Styles will be inducted into the Hall of Fame 2026
April 13	WrestleMania Raw	Golden 1 Center	Sacramento, California	Dragon Lee & Je'Von Evans vs. Rusev & JD McDonagh	—N/a	The last Raw before WrestleMania 42
April 20	WrestleMania Fallout	T-Mobile Arena	Paradise, Nevada	Finn Bálor vs. JD McDonagh	—N/a	The Raw after WrestleMania 42
June 1	Raw Italy	Inalpi Arena	Turin, Italy	Seth Rollins vs. Bron Breakker	—N/a	First Raw in Italy since 2007
June 8	Raw Paris	Accor Arena	Paris, France	Je'Von Evans vs. Seth Rollins vs. Talla Tonga vs. Ricky Saints in a Fatal 4-way match to Qualifying first round King of the Ring tournament	—N/a	
August 3	SummerSlam Fallout	Casey's Center	Des Moines, Iowa	Jacob Fatu vs. Royce Keys in a Street Fight	—N/a	The Raw after SummerSlam
September 14	Raw in Mexico City special	Arena CDMX	Mexico City, Mexico	Roman Reigns (c) vs. Penta for the World Heavyweight Championship	—N/a	The second episode of Raw to be broadcast live from Mexico since 2011.
October 5	Money in the Bank Raw	Enterprise Center	St. Louis, Missouri	Liv Morgan vs. Becky Lynch for No. 1 Contender for WWE Women's World Championship	—N/a	The final Raw before Money in the Bank.
December 14	John Cena Classic	ESPN Wide World of Sports Complex	Osceola County, Florida			

== See also ==
- List of WWE SmackDown special episodes
- List of WWE NXT special episodes
