= WWE Raw is XXX =

Professional wrestling television special

Raw is XXX
- Promotional poster featuring Bobby Lashley, Austin Theory, Becky Lynch, Roman Reigns, Bianca Belair, and Seth "Freakin" Rollins
- Promotion: WWE
- Brand(s): Raw; SmackDown
- Date: January 23, 2023
- City: Philadelphia, Pennsylvania
- Venue: Wells Fargo Center
- Attendance: 16,957

Raw special episodes chronology
← Previous; Raw 25 Years	Next → Day 1

Raw is XXX (pronounced "Raw is Thirty") was a professional wrestling television special of WWE's weekly television series, Monday Night Raw. The special episode was held on January 23, 2023, at the Wells Fargo Center in Philadelphia, Pennsylvania and was broadcast live on the USA Network. It was a commemoration of the 30th anniversary of the program's debut in January 1993 as well as the final Raw before the 2023 Royal Rumble event. The event set a financial record for the company, becoming the highest-grossing domestic gate in Raw's history.

The event also featured various appearances from WWE Hall of Famers. These included, among others, Shawn Michaels and The Undertaker—who both notably appeared on the very first episode of Raw—Kurt Angle, Ric Flair, X-Pac, Teddy Long, Jerry "The King" Lawler, Ron Simmons, "Road Dogg" Jesse James (who is the WWE Senior Vice President of Live Events), Triple H (who is the WWE Chief Content Officer), Hulk Hogan, "The Million Dollar Man" Ted DiBiase, Jimmy Hart, Mike "I.R.S." Rotunda, Lita, Alundra Blayze, The Godfather, Diamond Dallas Page, and Booker T.

Four matches were contested on the event's card, as well as several segments featuring current wrestlers and the returning WWE Hall of Famers and veterans; many of these segments progressed storylines for the upcoming Royal Rumble event. In the main event, Austin Theory defeated Bobby Lashley in a No Disqualification match to retain the United States Championship, thanks to a returning Brock Lesnar, in his first appearance since Crown Jewel in November 2022, who attacked Lashley. In another prominent match, which was the first match on the event's card, Jey Uso and Sami Zayn, who substituted for Jimmy Uso after Jimmy suffered an injury (kayfabe), defeated The Judgment Day (Damian Priest and Dominik Mysterio) to retain the Raw Tag Team Championship.

In one of the segments, The Undertaker and Bray Wyatt shared the ring in a segment with LA Knight, in which Undertaker seemingly gave Wyatt his approval in what many called a "passing of the torch" moment. Wyatt would later state how much this segment meant to him and his career. It would turn out to be Wyatt's final in-person appearance on Raw before his death later in the same year.

== Production ==
=== Background ===
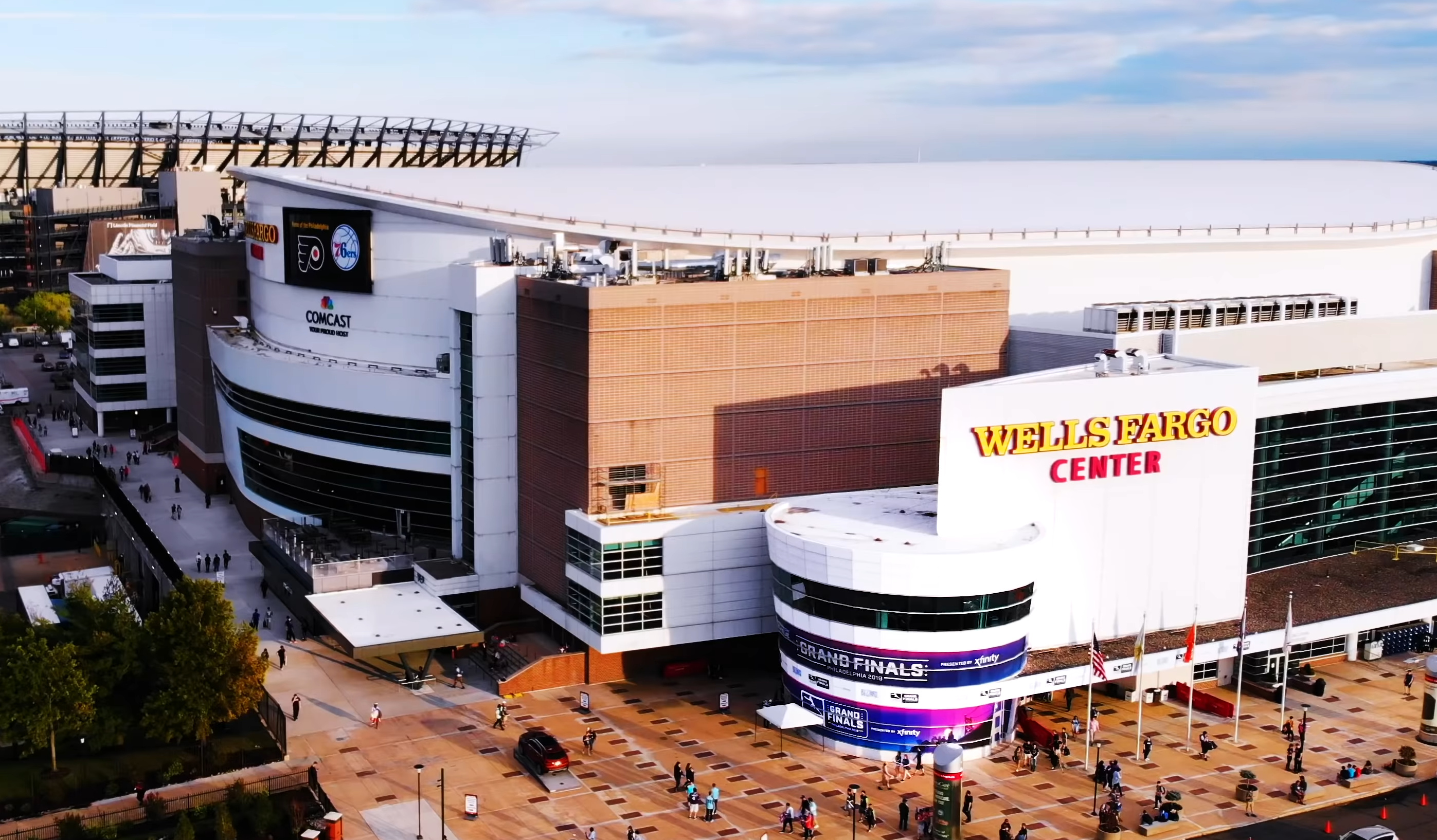
The event was held at the Wells Fargo Center in Philadelphia, Pennsylvania.

Monday Night Raw is a professional wrestling television program produced by the American promotion WWE. It first aired on January 11, 1993, on the USA Network and since became the longest-running weekly episodic program in television history with no reruns albeit from its brief run on TNN (renamed to Spike TV in 2003 and now known as the Paramount Network) from 2000 to 2005. It is one of WWE's two flagship television programs, alongside Friday Night SmackDown, and is also the namesake program for the company's Raw brand, a subdivision of WWE's main roster where wrestlers are exclusively assigned to perform on a weekly basis, albeit with some exceptions. On November 7, 2022, WWE announced that Raw would celebrate its 30th anniversary on January 23, 2023, with a special episode titled "Raw is XXX", a throwback to Raw is War, which was the show's name during the Monday Night War, with the special also using a similar logo design. Due to the occasion and also a cross-brand storyline, some wrestlers from the SmackDown brand were also featured. The event was held at the Wells Fargo Center in Philadelphia, Pennsylvania and was broadcast live on the USA Network. On the day of the event, it was revealed that the first hour would air commercial-free. The official theme song for the television special was "I'm Good (Blue)" by David Guetta and Bebe Rexha.

In addition to the matches scheduled for the event, WWE announced that several WWE Hall of Famers and veterans would be making appearances at "Raw is XXX". These included, among others, Shawn Michaels, The Undertaker, Kurt Angle, Ric Flair, X-Pac, Teddy Long, Jerry "The King" Lawler, Ron Simmons, "Road Dogg" Jesse James, Triple H, Hulk Hogan, Jimmy Hart, Alundra Blayze, "The Million Dollar Man" Ted DiBiase, Lita, The Godfather, Diamond Dallas Page, and Booker T. Notably, Michaels and Undertaker performed on the very first episode of Raw.

=== Storylines ===
The event included matches that resulted from scripted storylines, where wrestlers portrayed heroes, villains, or less distinguishable characters in scripted events that built tension and culminated in a wrestling match or series of matches. Results were predetermined by WWE's writers on the Raw and SmackDown brands, while storylines were produced on WWE's weekly television shows, Raw and SmackDown.

After Survivor Series: WarGames, The Usos (Jey Uso and Jimmy Uso), Solo Sikoa, and Sami Zayn of The Bloodline—all from SmackDown—began invading Raw on a weekly basis in response to Kevin Owens interfering with The Bloodline on SmackDown. The invasion persisted up to the January 9, 2023, episode of Raw, which led to WWE official Adam Pearce ordering The Usos to defend the Raw Tag Team Championship against the winners of that night's tag team turmoil match. The tag team turmoil was won by The Judgment Day's Damian Priest and Dominik Mysterio, and the title match was scheduled for "Raw is XXX". Since May 2022, The Usos had held both the Raw and SmackDown Tag Team Championships together as the Undisputed WWE Tag Team Champions. "Raw is XXX" was the first instance of The Usos defending the titles separately.

On January 16, it was announced that at "Raw is XXX", there would be a Bloodline acknowledgement ceremony for Bloodline leader and Undisputed WWE Universal Champion, Roman Reigns, with members of the Anoaʻi family to take part. However, this segment was later changed into Tribal Court for the trial of The Bloodline's honorary member, Sami Zayn, for his actions on the January 20 episode of SmackDown. On that SmackDown, a contract signing for a championship match between Reigns and Kevin Owens at the Royal Rumble was held, however, Owens attacked all members of The Bloodline, including performing a pop-up powerbomb on Reigns through a table, and signed the contract. Zayn, who had been backstage preparing for The Bloodline's departure, ran out to reprimand Owens for his actions and chased after him, however, Owens retreated into the crowd. As The Bloodline tended to Reigns, he saw Zayn holding the contract thinking that Zayn had a hand in the ambush.

On the January 16 episode of Raw, Bobby Lashley won a six-man elimination match to earn a United States Championship match against Austin Theory at "Raw is XXX". On the day of the event, the stipulation was changed to a No Disqualification match.

At Survivor Series: WarGames, Damage CTRL (Bayley, Dakota Kai, and Iyo Sky) took part in a WarGames match, where they lost to Becky Lynch's team. Over the next few weeks, Kai and Sky continued targeting Lynch until the December 12, 2022, episode of Raw, where Lynch sent them retreating before Bayley's match. The following week, Bayley defeated Lynch with the distraction of Kai and Sky. On the January 2, 2023, episode, Bayley cost Lynch a win in a tag team match. Two weeks later, Lynch claimed Bayley always had to hide behind Kai and Sky and goaded Bayley into accepting a Steel Cage match against her at "Raw is XXX".

== Event ==
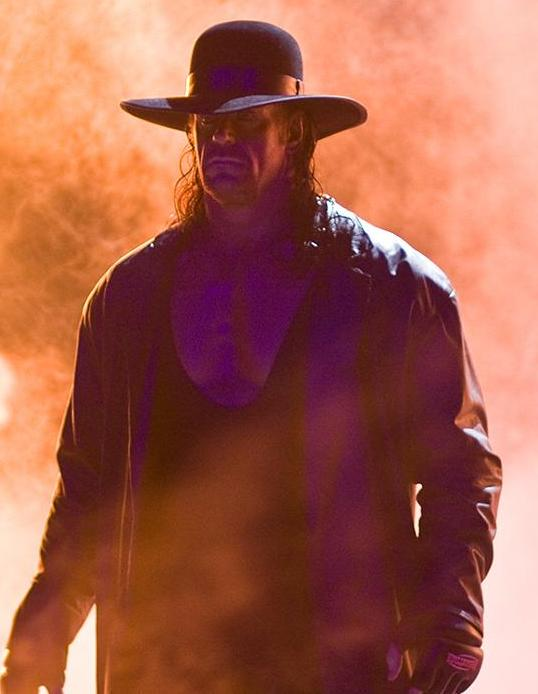
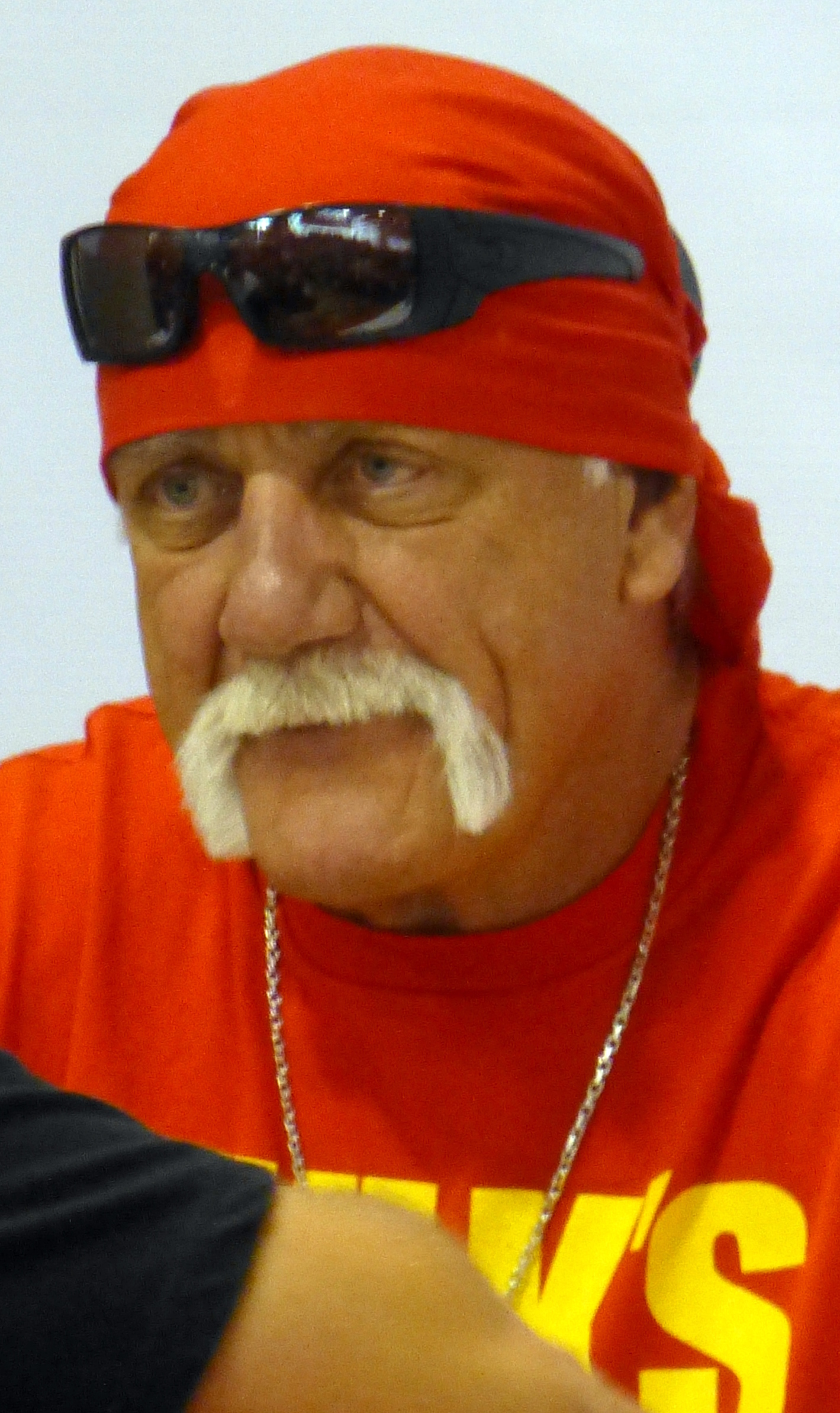
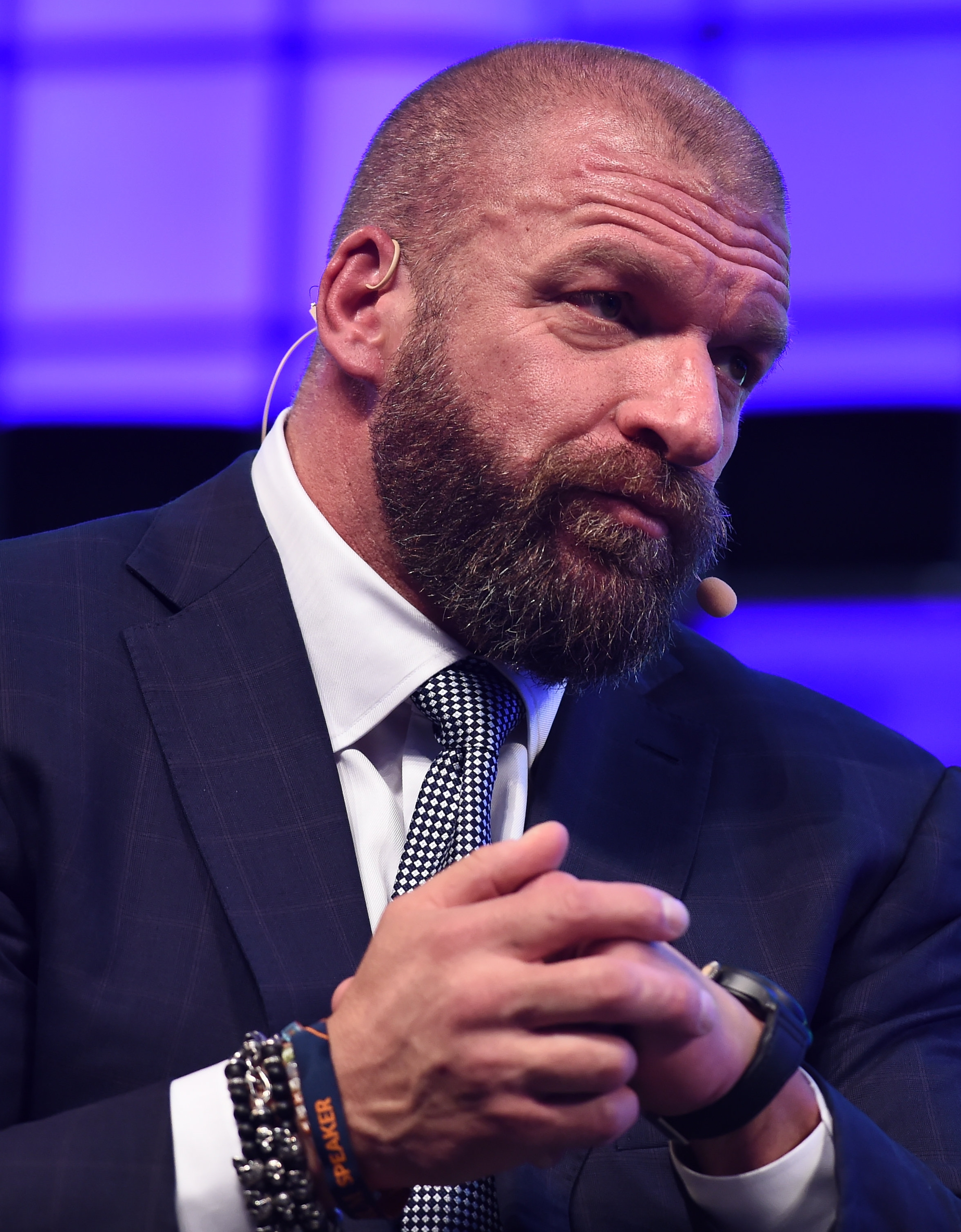
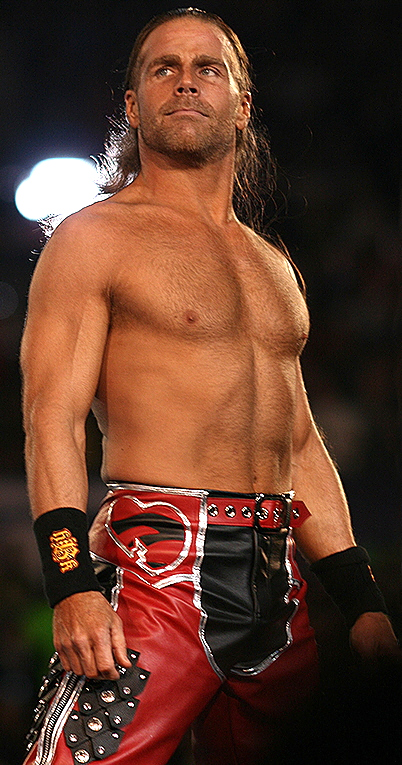
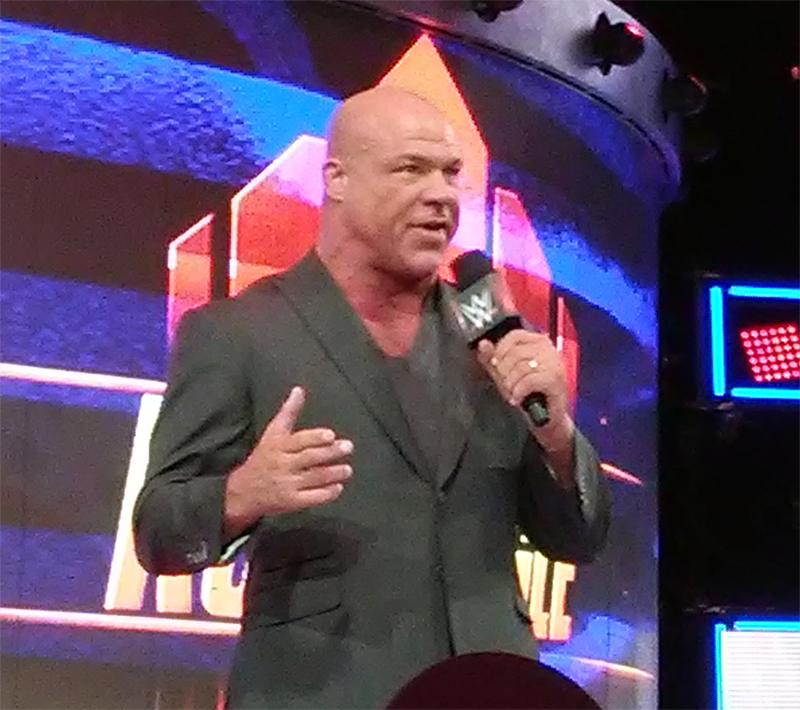
(left to right): The Undertaker, Hulk Hogan, Triple H, Shawn Michaels, and Kurt Angle were some of the WWE Hall of Famers that appeared at "Raw is XXX"

"Raw is XXX" opened with Hulk Hogan and Jimmy Hart welcoming everyone to the event, after which, Hogan hyped up the crowd with his catchphrase. A video package was then shown, highlighting several moments from Raw's history over the last 30 years.

Next, The Bloodline (Roman Reigns, Jey Uso, Jimmy Uso, Solo Sikoa, and special counsel Paul Heyman) held a Tribal Court for the trial of the honorary member Sami Zayn due to his actions on the previous episode of SmackDown. Heyman presented evidence that framed Zayn as if he had been conspiring against Reigns. Zayn was taken aback by Heyman, as Heyman had shown Zayn support for the last several months, and a disheartened Zayn claimed that he had no defense against Heyman's betrayal. An enraged Reigns then reprimanded Zayn for not defending himself and then ordered Sikoa to take him out. As Sikoa attempted to strike Zayn, Jey intervened and stated that although he originally did not trust Zayn, he gathered his own evidence in defense of Zayn, which showed Zayn's selflessness and loyalty to The Bloodline. Reigns declared that Zayn was not guilty for the time being and that his next test of loyalty would come at the Royal Rumble that Saturday.

After that, The Usos (Jey Uso and Jimmy Uso), accompanied by Sami Zayn, defended the Raw Tag Team Championship against The Judgment Day (represented by Damian Priest and Dominik Mysterio), accompanied by Finn Bálor and Rhea Ripley. During the match, Bálor attacked Jey, who was on the top rope. The referee caught Bálor and ejected him from ringside. Jimmy then performed a diving plancha on Priest outside the ring. As Jimmy brought Priest back in the ring, Jimmy injured his own knee, rendering him unable to continue the match. WWE official Adam Pearce stated that if Jimmy could not continue, then The Usos would forfeit the match and their championship. Zayn intervened and pleaded with Pearce to allow him to wrestle in Jimmy's place and Pearce complied. At one point, Ripley distracted the referee, allowing Priest to perform South of Heaven on Zayn for a nearfall. In the climax, Zayn made a blind tag, and Jey performed a superkick on Mysterio. Jey and Zayn then performed the 1D on Mysterio and Zayn pinned him to retain the titles for The Usos.

In a backstage segment, John "Bradshaw" Layfield (JBL) and Baron Corbin attempted to enter a poker tournament featuring various current wrestlers and WWE Hall of Famers and veterans, only for The Godfather to prevent them from doing so. After JBL spoke to the owner running the tournament, which was revealed to be JBL's former APA tag team partner Ron Simmons, Corbin and JBL bribed Simmons and Godfather to allow them to enter the tournament. Following that, an in-ring segment occurred where SmackDown's LA Knight spoke about his upcoming match against Bray Wyatt at the Royal Rumble. He was interrupted by The Undertaker, who rode out on his motorcycle in his "American Badass" gimmick. Knight then threatened The Undertaker, however, Knight backed off and requested Undertaker to watch his Royal Rumble match. Wyatt then came out. Undertaker feigned performing a chokeslam on Knight only to shove Knight towards Wyatt, with Wyatt performing a Sister Abigail on Knight. Undertaker then whispered something to Wyatt and then rode off backstage on his motorcycle.

In another backstage segment, Diamond Dallas Page won a round of poker that involved Alundra Blayze, Baron Corbin, and Alpha Academy (Chad Gable and Otis). Also, Corbin picked up Blayze's WWE Women's Championship belt (a reference to an episode of WCW Monday Nitro from December 1995, where Blayze discarded the title in the trash).

Next, Becky Lynch was supposed to face Damage CTRL's leader, Bayley, in a Steel Cage match. However, during Lynch's entrance, Dakota Kai and Iyo Sky ambushed her from behind. Kai, Sky, and Bayley then brought Lynch inside the cage and Kai locked the door with a chain and a padlock. Sky then performed a moonsault on Lynch. WWE official Adam Pearce then came out to restore order and cut the chain using a bolt cutter. Lynch was unable to compete, thus the match was called off.

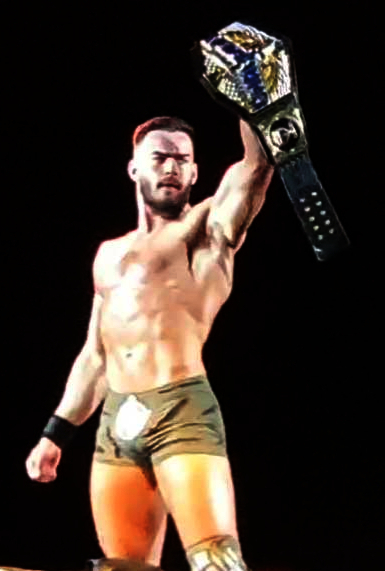
Austin Theory defended his United States Championship against Bobby Lashley in a No Disqualification match in the main event

Next, D-Generation X (DX) (Triple H, Shawn Michaels, X-Pac, and "Road Dogg" Jesse James), along with Kurt Angle, came out. DX were confused as to why Angle was there and Angle said that he always wanted to be a member of the group. They were then interrupted by SmackDown's Imperium (Intercontinental Champion Gunther, Ludwig Kaiser, and Giovanni Vinci), who claimed that DX was making a mockery of professional wrestling. Gunther threatened to kick DX out of the ring unless they did something about it, however, none of DX stepped up as they were "retired" and "old". Triple H then stated that Angle would fight, however, Angle refused. This led to Seth "Freakin" Rollins and The Street Profits (Angelo Dawkins and Montez Ford) coming out to face Imperium in a six-man tag team match. Teddy Long then came out to formally announce the match and Angle then removed his DX shirt to reveal a referee shirt and thus was appointed as the special guest referee. In the end, Ford performed a top rope frog splash on Vinci, and then Rollins followed up with The Stomp on Vinci to win the match.

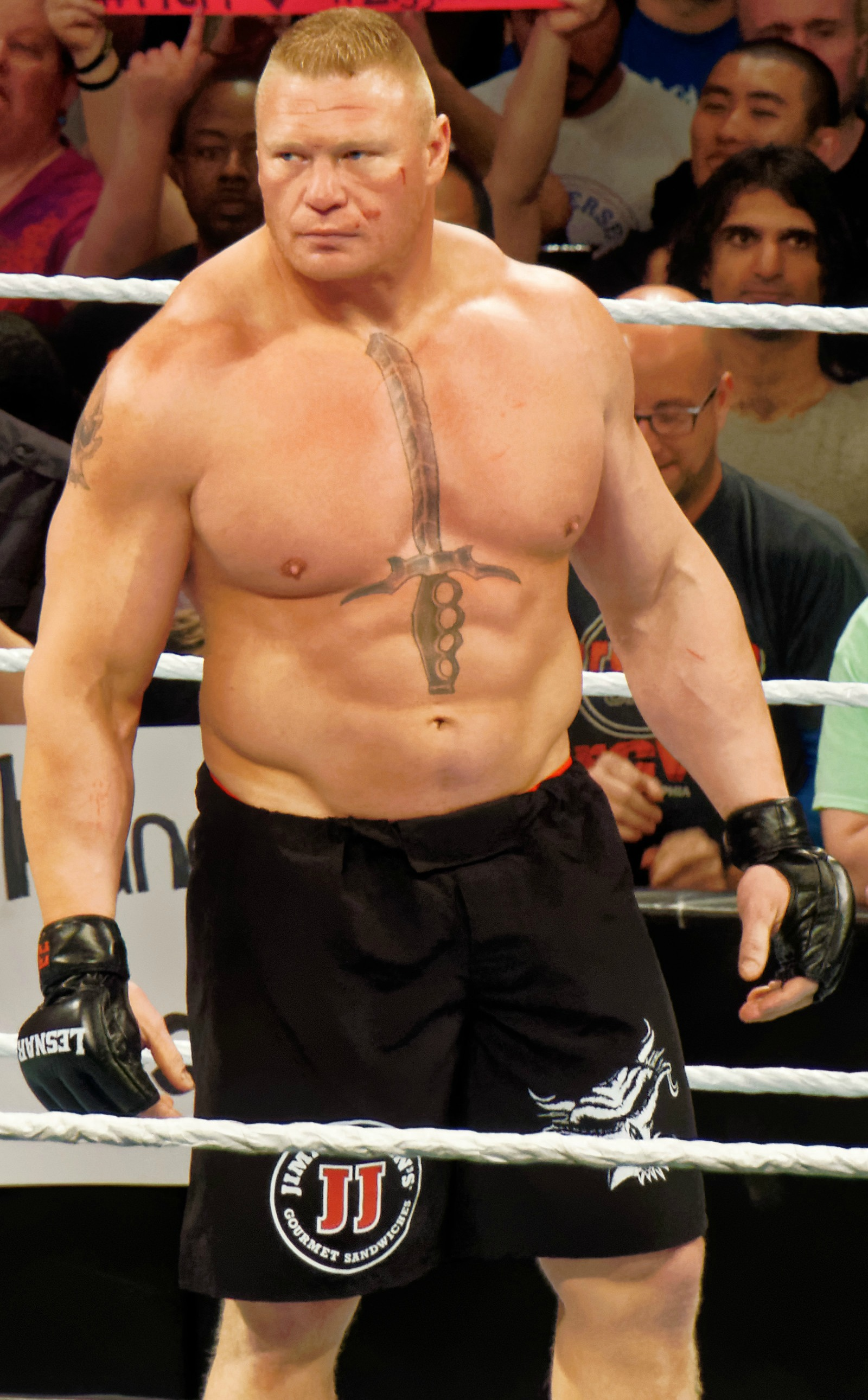
After a two-month hiatus, Brock Lesnar made his return during the main event to continue a feud with Bobby Lashley.

Another backstage segment of the poker tournament occurred where Corbin picked up a win against Ted DiBiase, after which a frustrated DiBiase walked off. Corbin and JBL collected their earnings, however, Mike "IRS" Rotunda appeared and reminded them to pay their taxes. IRS placed the winnings in a briefcase and handed Corbin a single $100 note, which IRS claimed was due to "after tax". Ron Simmons then appeared and proclaimed his "DAMN" catchphrase.

Following that, Bobby Lashley was interviewed backstage about his United States Championship match against Austin Theory in the main event. MVP appeared to offer his and Omos' assistance and stated that they should celebrate when Lashley wins the title. Lashley refused MVP and stated he would handle his own business.

Next, Ric Flair appeared on stage and introduced his daughter, SmackDown Women's Champion Charlotte Flair. Charlotte stated the women's wrestling revolution began on Raw several years ago and although she was SmackDown's champion, Raw was her home. Raw Women's Champion Bianca Belair then came out and stated that Raw was now her show. They were interrupted by Sonya Deville, who had been feuding with Charlotte on SmackDown. This led to a match between Belair and Deville, which Belair won after performing the Kiss of Death on Deville. Following the match, Belair addressed her upcoming title defense against Alexa Bliss at the Royal Rumble and stated that she would leave the event as champion. Bliss then appeared on the TitanTron and stated that she would win the Raw Women's Championship at the Royal Rumble.

After that, The Miz came out and was unpleased that none of his notable moments from Raw's history were being celebrated that night. After Miz bragged about his accolades, Kevin Owens appeared and performed a Stunner on Miz. Owens then addressed his Undisputed WWE Universal Championship match against Roman Reigns coming up at the Royal Rumble and stated that he would do everything it took to win the title. Miz then stumbled to his feet only for Owens to perform another Stunner on him.

To close the show was the main event, in which Austin Theory defended the United States Championship against Bobby Lashley in a No Disqualification match. In the closing moments, after Lashley put Theory through a table, Brock Lesnar made a surprise return in his first appearance since his match against Lashley at Crown Jewel in November 2022. Lesnar performed an F-5 on Lashley and then an F-5 on Theory on top of Lashley, allowing Theory to pin Lashley and retain the title.

== Reception ==
WWE reported that "Raw is XXX" set a financial record for the company. It was the highest-grossing gate in Raw's history for episodes held in the United States. The exact financial amount was not revealed. WWE also claimed a sellout attendance of 16,957. The event also drew the highest ratings and viewership for Raw since 2020, with a 0.70 rating in the 18–49 demographic and 2.344 million viewers. It was also the number one ranked show for the night on both broadcast and cable television.

== Aftermath ==
Following the event, it was reported that the reason the Steel Cage match between Becky Lynch and Bayley was called off was due to The Bloodline trial segment running much longer than intended. Some other segments were also cut short due to this, but the Steel Cage match was affected the most. There was an option to still do the match, however, it would have only lasted about two minutes, so WWE decided to instead call off the match and set up an angle for a future match between the two women. At the Royal Rumble, Damage CTRL (Bayley, Dakota Kai, and Iyo Sky) and Becky Lynch entered the women's Royal Rumble match. Although Lynch eliminated Kai and Sky, Bayley eliminated Lynch, who was eliminated immediately afterwards. Following this, a brawl ensued between Lynch and Damage CTRL which spilled out of the ring and into the crowd. Lynch then goaded Bayley on the following episode of Raw into facing her in their initial Steel Cage match. Bayley refused, however, she was forced to accept due as Lynch threatened to injure Kai's leg with a chair. The Steel Cage match was subsequently rescheduled for the February 6 episode, where a returning Lita fended off interference from Kai and Sky, and assisted Lynch in defeating Bayley. After another WWE Hall of Famer, Trish Stratus, helped Lynch and Lita defeated Kai and Sky for the WWE Women's Tag Team Championship on the February 27 episode, a six-woman tag team match pitting Lynch, Lita, and Stratus against Damage CTRL was scheduled for WrestleMania 39.

On the following episode of SmackDown, Brock Lesnar attacked Bobby Lashley once again and declared his participation for the men's Royal Rumble match. At the event, Lashley eliminated Lesnar, after which, Lesnar threw a tantrum at ringside and attacked a referee before leaving. On the February 6 episode of Raw, Lesnar appeared with a match contract and challenged Lashley to another match at Elimination Chamber. Lashley stated that he would give him an answer after reviewing the contract. This prompted Lesnar to attack Lashley with two F-5s. An official contract signing for their match took place the following week, and after Lashley took out Lesnar, he signed the contract to make the match official.

During the Royal Rumble pre-show, Roman Reigns ordered Sami Zayn to accompany him for his title defense against Kevin Owens. In the main event, Reigns defeated Owens to retain the Undisputed WWE Universal Championship. Following the match, The Bloodline handcuffed Owens to the ring ropes and assaulted Owens as a conflicted Zayn watched on. Reigns then attempted to attack Owens with a chair only for Zayn to intervene. Zayn then pleaded with Reigns not to attack Owens as such an attack was beneath Reigns' status. Reigns then ordered Zayn to attack Owens with the chair. After Reigns berated Zayn, Zayn turned on Reigns and struck him with the chair. Zayn apologized to a confused Jey Uso, and Jimmy Uso and Solo Sikoa then attacked Zayn. An emotionally distraught Jey, who had taken a liking to Zayn, left the ring as the rest of The Bloodline continued their assault on Zayn before leaving Zayn and Owens lying in the ring. On the following episode of SmackDown, as Reigns tried to address the events from the Royal Rumble, Zayn attacked Reigns from behind and stated that he initially did not want anything from Reigns, however, Zayn then stated that he now wanted the Undisputed WWE Universal Championship. Since Jey was absent from the episode, Jimmy and Sikoa then attacked Zayn and Reigns accepted his challenge, stating that since Zayn hurt his family, he would hurt Zayn in front of his own family in Montreal at Elimination Chamber.

This event turned out to be the final time Bray Wyatt appeared on WWE Raw. He wrestled his final televised match at the 2023 Royal Rumble in a Mountain Dew Pitch Black match, against LA Knight, and was victorious. The following month, Wyatt took a hiatus due to contracting COVID-19 (unspecified illness at that time), which exacerbated his heart issues. Although, as of August 19, he was shown to have gotten back in shape and was closing in on a WWE return, he died on the 24th from a heart attack at the age of 36. WWE presented a special tribute show on Smackdown to him and Terry Funk, who died the day prior to Wyatt.

== Results ==
No.	Results	Stipulations	Times
1	Jey Uso (c) and Sami Zayn (Note: The match started with The Usos (Jey Uso and Jimmy Uso) defending the championship; however, Jimmy suffered a (storyline) injury midway through the match and was deemed unable to continue. WWE official Adam Pearce allowed Sami Zayn to take Jimmy's place in the match so that The Usos would not forfeit the match and their championship.) defeated The Judgment Day (Damian Priest and Dominik Mysterio) (with Finn Bálor and Rhea Ripley) by pinfall	Tag team match for the Undisputed WWE Tag Team Championship	14:05
2	Seth "Freakin" Rollins and The Street Profits (Angelo Dawkins and Montez Ford) defeated Imperium (Gunther, Giovanni Vinci, and Ludwig Kaiser) by pinfall	Six-man tag team match with Kurt Angle as the special guest referee.	13:05
3	Bianca Belair defeated Sonya Deville by pinfall	Singles match	8:25
4	Austin Theory (c) defeated Bobby Lashley by pinfall	No Disqualification match for the WWE United States Championship	14:20
(c) / – the champion(s) heading into the match

== See also ==
- List of WWE Raw special episodes
