= WWE Raw 25 Years =

2018 television event

- Promotional poster for the 25th Anniversary of Raw
- Promotion: WWE
- Brand(s): Raw; SmackDown
- Date: January 22, 2018
- City: Brooklyn, New York; Manhattan, New York
- Venue: Barclays Center; Manhattan Center
- Tagline: Then. Now. Forever.

Raw special episodes chronology
← Previous; Raw 1000	Next → Raw Is XXX

Raw 25 Years was a special episode of WWE's weekly television series Raw, broadcast on the USA Network on January 22, 2018. The episode was a commemoration of the 25th anniversary of the program's debut in January 1993.

The event was held in two separate venues in New York City – the Barclays Center in Brooklyn and the Manhattan Center Grand Ballroom in Manhattan, the latter of which hosted the first episode of Raw.The event also featured various appearances from WWE Hall of Famers and legends. These included, among others, Shawn Michaels and The Undertaker—who both notably appeared on the very first episode of Raw—Stone Cold Steve Austin, Shane McMahon, Stephanie McMahon (the then WWE Chief Brand Officer), Vince McMahon (the then principal owner and chief executive officer of WWE), Teddy Long, The Brooklyn Brawler, Brother Love, The Boogeyman, William Regal, Eric Bischoff, "The Million Dollar Man" Ted DiBiase, John Laurinaitis, MVP, John Bradshaw Layfield, Ron Simmons, Ric Flair, Christian, X-Pac, Kelly Kelly, Bubba Ray Dudley, D-Von Dudley, Trish Stratus, Lillian Garcia, Terri Runnels, Michelle McCool, Triple H, Road Dogg, Billy Gunn, Gene Okerlund, Mark Henry, Scott Hall, and The Godfather.

== Background ==
The card consisted of nine matches, including four dark matches, that resulted from scripted storylines and had results predetermined by WWE's writers on the Raw and SmackDown brands. Storylines were produced on WWE's weekly television shows, Monday Night Raw, SmackDown Live, and 205 Live, the latter of which is cruiserweight-exclusive. Raw first aired on January 11, 1993, on USA Network and since became the longest-running weekly episodic program in television history with no reruns albeit from its brief run on TNN (renamed to Spike TV in 2003 and now known as the Paramount Network) from 2000 to 2005. On October 30, 2017, WWE announced that Raw would celebrate its 25 anniversary on January 22, 2018.

== Event ==
Other on-screen personnel
Role:	Name:
Pre-show panel	Renee Young
Pre-show panel	Peter Rosenberg
Pre-show panel	David Otunga
Pre-show panel	Sam Roberts
Commentators	Michael Cole (Barclays)
Commentators	Corey Graves (Barclays)
Commentators	Booker T (Barclays)
Commentators	Jim Ross (Manhattan)
Commentators	Jerry "The King" Lawler (Manhattan)
Ring announcers	JoJo (Barclays)
Ring announcers	Greg Hamilton (Barclays)
Ring announcers	Howard Finkel (Manhattan)
Referees	Jone Cone
Referees	Chad Patton
Referees	Shawn Bennett
Referees	Rod Zapata
Referees	Mike Chioda
Interviewer	Charly Caruso

=== Dark matches ===
Before and during the event, there were a series of untelevised matches for the live crowds in attendance. The first match in the Barclays Center saw Goldust defeat Curt Hawkins and later Gran Metalik and Kalisto defeat Gentleman Jack Gallagher and TJP. The Manhattan Center saw two cruiserweight matches with Mustafa Ali defeating Lince Dorado and Akira Tozawa and Hideo Itami defeating Drew Gulak and Tony Nese. The matches from the Barclays Center were later shown on WWE Main Event.

=== Preliminary matches ===
The event opened in the Barclays Center with Vince McMahon and his children Stephanie and Shane celebrating the 25th anniversary of Raw. Later in the segment, Hall of Famer Stone Cold Steve Austin appeared to attack both Shane and Vince with Stone Cold Stunners.

In the first televised match at the Barclays Center, Asuka, Bayley, Mickie James, and Sasha Banks faced Mandy Rose, Sonya Deville, Alicia Fox, and Nia Jax. Banks forced Fox to submit to the Banks Statement for the win. After the match, Asuka threw her partners over the top rope, symbolizing eliminating them in the upcoming Royal Rumble match. Later a segment occurred in which Raw General Manager Kurt Angle interacted with various WWE legends, including Jonathan Coachman, Harvey Wippleman, The Brooklyn Brawler, Teddy Long, Brother Love, and The Boogeyman.

In the second match, Roman Reigns defended the WWE Intercontinental Championship against The Miz. After Reigns collided with an exposed turnbuckle, The Miz executed the Skull Crushing Finale to win the title for the eighth time in his career.

The event opened in the Manhattan Center with a segment featuring The Undertaker. In the first match at the Manhattan Center, Bray Wyatt defeated "Woken" Matt Hardy after executing a Sister Abigail. After the match in a non-televised segment, Jeff Hardy appeared and said that Wyatt will soon be "classified as obsolete."

Back in the Barclays Center, Chris Jericho made a special appearance, putting Elias on the "List of Jericho." Shortly after, Elias was interrupted by John Cena during his musical performance, which led to Elias attacking Cena with a low blow and then hitting him with his guitar.

=== Main event matches ===
The main event at the Barclays Center was a tag team match, which saw Heath Slater and Rhyno fight Titus Worldwide (Titus O'Neil and Apollo Crews) to a no contest. Following the match, The Dudley Boyz (Bubba Ray and D-Von) appeared, with the duo attacking Slater with the Whassup? before putting him through a table with the 3D.

Later at the Manhattan Center, D-Generation X (X-Pac, Shawn Michaels, Triple H, and The New Age Outlaws), Razor Ramon, and Bálor Club (Finn Bálor, Luke Gallows and Karl Anderson) appeared in the ring to celebrate the 25th anniversary of Raw and to exchange "Too Sweets" before being interrupted by The Revival (Dash Wilder and Scott Dawson). The interruption led to a tag match between Luke Gallows and Karl Anderson and The Revival, which saw Gallows and Anderson emerge victorious after performing the Magic Killer on Dash Wilder. After the match in a non-televised segment, The Miz appeared and insulted D-Generation X, causing Raw Tag Team Champion Seth Rollins to interrupt and attack The Miz with a curb stomp.

The show concluded with a segment from the Barclays Center, which saw Braun Strowman, Kane, and WWE Universal Champion Brock Lesnar brawl. The three wrestlers fought until Strowman put Lesnar through the announcers table with a running powerslam.

== Reception ==
Raw 25 Years received mixed to negative reviews and reactions from critics and WWE fans. The Undertaker's segment in particular was criticized, being said to have "made no sense" and been "too cryptic."

Those who attended the event live, particularly those who attended the Manhattan Center portion, were disappointed by what was described as WWE's "poor planning" of the event. The venue in Manhattan was said to have not provided adequate screens for attendees to watch the portion of the event happening at Brooklyn's Barclays Center, resulting in extra downtime for the live crowd. Although WWE scheduled several non-televised matches at the Manhattan Center, fans became upset with the event and chanted profanities and called for refunds.

== Aftermath ==
Hours prior to the event then-WWE Cruiserweight Champion Enzo Amore was suspended due to a violation of WWE's zero tolerance policy regarding matters involving sexual harassment and sexual assault. WWE released a statement indicating he would remain suspended "until the matter [was] resolved." 15 minutes after the show ended, Amore was released by WWE and the Cruiserweight Championship was vacated. The following day on 205 Live, SmackDown General Manager Daniel Bryan announced that Amore was no longer part of the 205 Live roster and that the show would receive a new on-screen general manager, which later revealed to be Drake Maverick, previously known as Rockstar Spud in Impact Wrestling. Maverick announced a 16-man tournament to crown a new champion with the finals being held at WrestleMania 34. The tournament and title would be won by Cedric Alexander.

== Results ==
Barclays Center
No.	Results	Stipulations	Times
1	Goldust defeated Curt Hawkins	Singles match (Note: This match aired on Main Event via tape delay)	—
2	Lucha House Party (Gran Metalik and Kalisto) defeated Gentleman Jack Gallagher and TJP	Tag team match (Note: This match aired on Main Event via tape delay)	—
3	Asuka, Bayley, Mickie James and Sasha Banks defeated Alicia Fox, Nia Jax and Absolution (Mandy Rose and Sonya Deville) (with Paige)	Eight-woman tag team match	12:05
4	The Miz (with The Miztourage (Bo Dallas and Curtis Axel)) defeated Roman Reigns (c)	Singles match for the WWE Intercontinental Championship	12:25
5	Heath and Rhyno vs. Titus Worldwide (Apollo Crews and Titus O'Neil) (with Dana Brooke) ended in a no contest	Tag team match	5:32
(c) / – the champion(s) heading into the match

Manhattan Center
No.	Results	Stipulations	Times
1^{D}	Mustafa Ali defeated Lince Dorado	Singles match	—
2^{D}	Akira Tozawa and Hideo Itami defeated Drew Gulak and Tony Nese	Tag team match	—
3	Bray Wyatt defeated "Woken" Matt Hardy	Singles match	5:55
4	Luke Gallows and Karl Anderson (with Finn Bálor, Razor Ramon, and D-Generation X (X-Pac, Shawn Michaels, Triple H, Road Dogg and Billy Gunn)) defeated The Revival (Dash Wilder and Scott Dawson)	Tag team match	1:50
D / – this was a dark match

== See also ==
- List of WWE Raw special episodes
