= WWE Tribute to the Troops results =

Results of every WWE Tribute to the Troops event

This is a list of results from every episode of WWE Tribute to the Troops.

== Results ==
=== 2003 ===
The 2003 edition was taped on December 20 from Camp Victory in Baghdad, Iraq and aired on Christmas Day on December 25 as a special episode of SmackDown!.

No.	Results	Stipulations	Times
1	The Acolytes Protection Agency (Bradshaw and Faarooq) defeated The World's Greatest Tag Team (Charlie Haas and Shelton Benjamin) by pinfall	Tag team match	4:38
2	Rikishi defeated Rhyno by pinfall	Singles match	2:28
3	Eddie Guerrero defeated Chris Benoit by pinfall	Singles match	11:38
4	John Cena defeated Big Show by pinfall	Singles match	4:12

=== 2004 ===
The 2004 edition was taped on December 18 from Camp Speicher in Tikrit, Iraq and aired on December 23 as a special episode of SmackDown!.

No.	Results	Stipulations	Times
1	Booker T defeated René Duprée by pinfall	Singles match	3:41
2	The Undertaker defeated Heidenreich by countout	Singles match	7:34
3	Hardcore Holly defeated Kenzo Suzuki by pinfall	Singles match	2:38
4	Eddie Guerrero and Rey Mysterio defeated Kurt Angle and Luther Reigns by pinfall	Tag team match	6:01

=== 2005 ===
The 2005 edition was taped on December 9 from the Air Base in Bagram, Afghanistan, and aired on December 19 as a special episode of Raw.

No.	Results	Stipulations	Times
1	Big Show defeated Carlito by pinfall	Singles match	1:09
2	Good Santa defeated Bad Santa by pinfall	No Ho-Ho-Holds Barred match where anything Go-Ho-Ho’s	1:58
3	Snitsky defeated Shelton Benjamin by pinfall	Singles match	1:52
4	John Cena defeated Chris Masters by pinfall	Singles match	4:53
5	Ric Flair (c) defeated Jonathan Coachman by submission	Singles match for the WWE Intercontinental Championship	2:01
6	Candice Michelle and Maria defeated Ashley and Trish Stratus by pinfall	Tag team match	4:16
7	Shawn Michaels defeated Triple H by pinfall	Boot Camp match	13:35
(c) / – the champion(s) heading into the match

=== 2006 ===
The 2006 edition was taped on December 8 from Camp Victory in Baghdad, Iraq and aired on Christmas Day on December 25 as a special episode of Raw.

No.	Results	Stipulations	Times
1	John Cena defeated Edge by pinfall	Singles match	16:33
2	CM Punk defeated Shelton Benjamin by pinfall	Singles match	4:47
3	The Undertaker defeated Johnny Nitro (with Melina) by pinfall	Singles match	3:57
4	Bobby Lashley defeated Hardcore Holly by pinfall	Singles match	6:28
5	Umaga defeated Jeff Hardy by pinfall	Singles match	5:53
6	Carlito defeated Randy Orton by pinfall	Singles match	5:09

=== 2007 ===
The 2007 edition was taped on December 7 from Camp Speicher in Tikrit, Iraq and aired on December 24 as a special episode of Raw.

No.	Results	Stipulations	Times
1	Chris Jericho defeated Randy Orton by disqualification	Singles match	14:19
2	Jeff Hardy defeated Carlito by pinfall	Singles match	6:34
3	Maria and Mickie James vs. Kelly Kelly and Layla ended in a no contest	Tag team match	4:00
4	Rey Mysterio defeated Mark Henry by pinfall	Singles match	4:17
5	D-Generation X (Shawn Michaels and Triple H) defeated Mr. Kennedy and Umaga by pinfall	Tag team match	11:00

=== 2008 ===
The 2008 edition was taped on December 5 from Camp Victory in Baghdad, Iraq and aired on December 20 on NBC. This was the first Tribute to the Troops to air as a standalone special.

No.	Results	Stipulations	Times
1	CM Punk, Jeff Hardy, and R-Truth defeated John "Bradshaw" Layfield, John Morrison, and The Miz by pinfall	Six-man tag team match	7:41
2	Batista, John Cena, and Rey Mysterio defeated Big Show, Chris Jericho, and Randy Orton by pinfall	Six-man tag team match	9:50

=== 2009 ===
The 2009 edition was taped on December 4 from Holt Memorial Stadium in Balad Air Base, Iraq and aired on NBC. WWE Diva Eve Torres served as ring announcer.

No.	Results	Stipulations	Times
1	Mark Henry and Rey Mysterio defeated Carlito and CM Punk by pinfall	Tag team match	3:02
2	The Miz defeated John Morrison by pinfall	Singles match	2:57
3	John Cena (c) defeated Chris Jericho by pinfall (Note: Despite John Cena defending the WWE Championship against Chris Jericho at the event, at the time it aired, Sheamus had already won the WWE Championship at TLC: Tables, Ladders & Chairs.)	Singles match for the WWE Championship	7:53
(c) / – the champion(s) heading into the match

=== 2010 ===
The 2010 edition was taped on December 11 in Fort Hood, Texas. This was the first Tribute to the Troops event not to be held in Iraq or Afghanistan. Diddy, Sherri Shepherd, Miss USA Rima Fakih, Trace Adkins, and Cedric the Entertainer appeared as celebrity guests. Modern Family cast member Ariel Winter sang "The Star-Spangled Banner" (though the performance did not air). Two versions of the program aired: a one-hour version on December 18 on NBC and a two-hour version on December 22 on USA Network. The NBC broadcast only included the tag team and six-man tag team matches.

No.	Results	Stipulations
1	Mark Henry won by last eliminating Sheamus. (Note: The other participants were: Chavo Guerrero, Chris Masters, Cody Rhodes, Daniel Bryan, David Otunga, Ezekiel Jackson, Heath Slater, Husky Harris, John Morrison, Justin Gabriel, Michael McGillicutty, Santino Marella, and Vladimir Kozlov.)	15-man battle royal
2	Big Show and Kofi Kingston defeated Dolph Ziggler and Jack Swagger by pinfall	Tag team match
3	R-Truth (with Eve Torres) defeated Ted DiBiase (with Maryse) by pinfall	Singles match
4	Kelly Kelly, Natalya, and The Bella Twins (Brie Bella and Nikki Bella) defeated Alicia Fox, Melina, and LayCool (Layla and Michelle McCool) by pinfall	Eight-Diva Santa's Little Helper tag team match
5	John Cena, Rey Mysterio, and Randy Orton defeated Alberto Del Rio, Wade Barrett, and The Miz (with Alex Riley) by pinfall	Six-man tag team match

=== 2011 ===
The 2011 edition was taped on December 11 at the Crown Coliseum in Fayetteville, North Carolina, in the attendance of U.S. service members from nearby Fort Bragg and their families. It aired on December 13 on USA Network, while NBC aired an edited, one-hour version (consisting of only the first and last matches) on December 17.

The event featured a pre-recorded message from President Barack Obama. Nickelback performed "Burn It to the Ground" (the Raw theme song at the time) and "When We Stand Together". Sgt. Slaughter made a special appearance, supporting Zack Ryder at ringside. Maria Menounos also made a special guest appearance, teaming with Alicia Fox, Eve Torres, and Kelly Kelly to defeat The Divas of Doom (Beth Phoenix and Natalya) and The Bella Twins (Brie Bella and Nikki Bella) in an eight-woman tag team match, in which she pinned Phoenix for the victory. George Wallace performed some stand-up comedy. Mary J. Blige performed "Need Someone" and "Family Affair".

No.	Results	Stipulations
1	Randy Orton vs. Wade Barrett ended in a double countout	Singles match
2	Zack Ryder (with Sgt. Slaughter) defeated Jack Swagger (with Dolph Ziggler) by pinfall	Singles match
3	Alicia Fox, Eve Torres, Kelly Kelly, and Maria Menounos defeated The Divas of Doom (Beth Phoenix and Natalya) and The Bella Twins (Brie Bella and Nikki Bella) by pinfall	Eight-Diva tag team match
4	Daniel Bryan defeated Cody Rhodes by pinfall	Singles match
5	Primo and Epico (with Rosa Mendes) defeated Air Boom (Evan Bourne and Kofi Kingston) by pinfall	Tag team match
6	Sheamus defeated Drew McIntyre by pinfall	Singles match
7	Big Show, CM Punk, and John Cena defeated Mark Henry, The Miz, and Alberto Del Rio (with Ricardo Rodriguez) by pinfall	Six-man tag team match

=== 2012 ===
The 2012 edition was taped on December 9 at The Scope in Norfolk, Virginia (billed as Naval Station Norfolk). USA Network aired a two-hour version of the show, which included all five matches, on December 19, while NBC aired a one-hour version three nights later, which included only the first and last match. The broadcast began with a pre-recorded message from President Barack Obama, featured musical performances from Flo Rida and Kid Rock, and a special MizTV segment with Kermit the Frog and Miss Piggy.

No.	Results	Stipulations
1	Randy Orton and Sheamus defeated Big Show and Dolph Ziggler by pinfall	Tag team match
2	Ryback defeated Alberto Del Rio (with Ricardo Rodriguez) by disqualification	Singles match
3	The Miz defeated Damien Sandow by pinfall	Singles match
4	R-Truth and Team Hell No (Daniel Bryan and Kane) defeated 3MB (Heath Slater, Drew McIntyre, and Jinder Mahal) by pinfall	Six-man tag team match
5	John Cena defeated Antonio Cesaro by pinfall	Singles match

=== 2013 ===
The 2013 edition was taped on December 11 at the Joint Base Lewis-McChord in Tacoma, Washington, and aired December 28 on NBC. The official theme songs for the event were "Here's To Us" by Kevin Rudolf, "People Back Home" by Florida Georgia Line, and "Waiting For Superman" by Daughtry. Daughtry and Jeff Dunham performed with Peanut (they read Twas the Night Before Christmas, similar to what they did with their 2008 special, except it was censored and they did not read it all the way through) with the former SportsNation host Michelle Beadle hosting.

No.	Results	Stipulations	Times
1^{D}	Big E Langston and Mark Henry defeated RybAxel (Ryback and Curtis Axel) by pinfall	Tag team match	—
2	Daniel Bryan defeated Bray Wyatt (with Erick Rowan and Luke Harper) by disqualification	Singles match	1:43
3	CM Punk and Daniel Bryan defeated Luke Harper and Erick Rowan (with Bray Wyatt) by disqualification	Tag team match	5:50
4	CM Punk, Daniel Bryan, and John Cena defeated The Wyatt Family (Bray Wyatt, Erick Rowan, and Luke Harper) by pinfall	Six-man tag team match	7:00
5^{D}	The Prime Time Players (Darren Young and Titus O'Neil) defeated 3MB (Drew McIntyre and Jinder Mahal) by pinfall	Tag team match	—
6^{D}	Rey Mysterio and The Usos (Jey Uso and Jimmy Uso) defeated The Shield (Dean Ambrose, Roman Reigns, and Seth Rollins) by pinfall	Six-man tag team match	—
7^{D}	Brie Bella won by last eliminating AJ Lee	Divas battle royal^{a}	—
8^{D}	Kofi Kingston defeated Dolph Ziggler by pinfall	Singles match	—
9	R-Truth defeated Fandango (with Summer Rae) by pinfall	Singles match	1:47
10	Big Show defeated Damien Sandow by pinfall	Singles match	2:05
D / – this was a dark match

^aThe other participants were: Aksana, Alicia Fox, Cameron, Eva Marie, JoJo, Kaitlyn, Naomi, Natalya, Nikki Bella, and Rosa Mendes.

=== 2014 ===
The 2014 edition was taped on December 9 in Columbus, Georgia (referred to on-air as Fort Benning). It aired on December 17 on the USA Network. The broadcast also aired on December 27 on NBC. The official theme song for the event was "This Is How We Roll" by Florida Georgia Line, who also performed live at the event. Hulk Hogan also made a special appearance.

No.	Results	Stipulations	Times
1	The Usos (Jey Uso and Jimmy Uso) defeated Gold and Stardust by pinfall	Tag team match	8:19
2	Naomi won by last eliminating Natalya	Santa's Helper Divas Battle Royal^{a}	4:01
3	Dean Ambrose defeated Bray Wyatt by pinfall	Boot Camp match	11:25
4	John Cena, Dolph Ziggler, Erick Rowan, and Ryback defeated Big Show, Kane, Luke Harper, and Seth Rollins (with Jamie Noble and Joey Mercury) by pinfall	Eight-man tag team match	9:48

^aThe other participants were: Alicia Fox, Brie Bella, Cameron, Emma, Nikki Bella, Paige, Rosa Mendes, and Summer Rae.

=== 2015 ===
The 2015 edition was taped on December 8 at the Jacksonville Veterans Memorial Arena in Jacksonville, Florida. It aired on December 23 on the USA Network. Howie Mandel and the band Train also performed live at the event. JoJo also performed the national anthem at the beginning of the show. Michael Cole and John "Bradshaw" Layfield were the commentators.

No.	Results	Stipulations	Times
1^{D}	Titus O'Neil defeated Heath Slater by pinfall	Singles match	—
2	Jack Swagger defeated Rusev (with Lana) by submission	Boot Camp match	11:02
3	Mark Henry defeated Bo Dallas by pinfall	Singles match	0:45
4	Ryback defeated Kevin Owens by countout	Singles match	3:05
5	Paige and Team B.A.D. (Naomi, Tamina, and Sasha Banks) defeated Becky Lynch, Charlotte, and Team Bella (Brie Bella and Alicia Fox) by submission	Eight-woman tag team match	4:37
6	Dean Ambrose, Kane, Roman Reigns, Ryback, The Usos (Jey Uso and Jimmy Uso), and The Dudley Boyz (Bubba Ray Dudley and D-Von Dudley) defeated The League of Nations (Sheamus, Alberto Del Rio, King Barrett, and Rusev) and The Wyatt Family (Bray Wyatt, Braun Strowman, Erick Rowan, and Luke Harper)	Sixteen-man tag team match	13:28
D / – this was a dark match

=== 2016 ===
The 2016 edition was taped on December 13 at the Verizon Center in Washington, D.C. It aired on December 14 on the USA Network. This was the first multi-branded special event since the 2010 edition, after the reintroduction of the WWE brand extension. Lilian Garcia performed the national anthem for the last time since she parted ways with company that year, before later returning to the company. Commentators for the year's event were Michael Cole, Byron Saxton, and John "Bradshaw" Layfield. Gabriel Iglesias also made a special appearance.

No.	Results	Stipulations	Times
1	Cesaro and Sheamus defeated The Shining Stars (Primo and Epico), Luke Gallows and Karl Anderson, and The Golden Truth (Goldust and R-Truth) by pinfall	Fatal four-way tag team match to determine number one contenders for the WWE Raw Tag Team Championship at Roadblock: End of the Line	9:35
2	Apollo Crews (with Gabriel Iglesias) defeated The Miz (with Maryse) by pinfall	Singles match	2:30
3	The Wyatt Family (Bray Wyatt, Luke Harper, and Randy Orton) defeated Dolph Ziggler and American Alpha (Chad Gable and Jason Jordan) by pinfall	Six-man tag team match	10:15
4	Bayley defeated Dana Brooke (with Charlotte Flair) by pinfall	Singles match	2:30
5	Jack Gallagher, Rich Swann, and T. J. Perkins defeated The Brian Kendrick, Drew Gulak, and Tony Nese by pinfall	Six-man tag team match	5:30
6	Roman Reigns and Big Cass (with Enzo Amore) defeated Kevin Owens and Rusev by pinfall	Tag team match	13:00

=== 2017 ===
The 2017 edition was taped on December 5 at the Naval Station San Diego in San Diego, California. It aired on December 14 on the USA Network.

No.	Results	Stipulations	Times
1	The Shield (Dean Ambrose, Roman Reigns, and Seth Rollins) defeated Samoa Joe and The Bar (Cesaro and Sheamus)	Six-man tag team match	9:57
2	Charlotte Flair (with Naomi) defeated Carmella (with Lana and Tamina) and Ruby Riott (with Liv Morgan and Sarah Logan) by pinfall	Triple threat match	10:08
3	The New Day (Big E and Xavier Woods) (with Kofi Kingston) and The Usos (Jey Uso and Jimmy Uso) defeated Chad Gable and Shelton Benjamin, and Rusev Day (Aiden English and Rusev) by pinfall	Eight-man tag team match	8:06
4	Absolution (Paige, Mandy Rose, and Sonya Deville) defeated Mickie James, Bayley, and Sasha Banks by pinfall	Six-woman tag team match	10:07
5	AJ Styles, Randy Orton, and Shinsuke Nakamura defeated Jinder Mahal, Kevin Owens, and Sami Zayn by pinfall	Six-man tag team match	10:21

=== 2018 ===
The 2018 edition was taped on December 4 at the Fort Hood in Killeen, Texas. It aired on December 20 on the USA Network.

No.	Results	Stipulations	Times
1	Natalya and Ronda Rousey defeated The Riott Squad (Liv Morgan and Sarah Logan) (with Ruby Riott), and Nia Jax and Tamina by submission	Triple threat tag team match	6:35
2	Finn Bálor and Elias defeated Drew McIntyre and Bobby Lashley (with Lio Rush) by pinfall	Tag team match	6:55
3	Becky Lynch and Charlotte Flair defeated Fire and Desire (Mandy Rose and Sonya Deville) by submission	Tag team match	6:10
4	AJ Styles and Seth Rollins defeated Daniel Bryan and Dean Ambrose by pinfall	Tag team match	10:18

=== 2019 ===
The 2019 edition was held on December 6 at the Marine Corps Air Station New River and Marine Corps Base Camp Lejeune in Jacksonville, North Carolina. Unlike other editions, the 2019 event was non-televised.

No.	Results	Stipulations
1	Humberto Carrillo and Kevin Owens defeated Drew McIntyre and Andrade (with Zelina Vega) by pinfall	Tag team match
2	The O.C. (AJ Styles, Karl Anderson, and Luke Gallows) defeated Ricochet and The Viking Raiders (Erik and Ivar) by pinfall	Six-man tag team match
3	The Kabuki Warriors (Asuka and Kairi Sane) defeated Natalya and Sarah Logan by pinfall	Tag team match
4	The Street Profits (Angelo Dawkins and Montez Ford) defeated Curt Hawkins and Zack Ryder by pinfall	Tag team match
5	Seth Rollins defeated Erick Rowan by pinfall	Boot Camp match

=== 2020 ===
The 2020 edition was held on December 6. Due to the COVID-19 pandemic, the event was held behind closed doors by way of the WWE ThunderDome bio-secure bubble, hosted at the Amway Center in Orlando, Florida. It marked the first time the company did not travel to a military base since the event's inception in 2003. It aired midday on Fox adjacent to the National Football League broadcasts. Hardy also performed at the event.

No.	Results	Stipulations	Times
1	Daniel Bryan, Jeff Hardy, Rey Mysterio, and The Street Profits (Angelo Dawkins and Montez Ford) defeated Elias, King Corbin, Sami Zayn, Dolph Ziggler, and Robert Roode by pinfall	Ten-man tag team match	11:20
2	Bianca Belair and Sasha Banks defeated Bayley and Natalya by submission	Tag team match	8:13
3	Drew McIntyre defeated The Miz (with John Morrison) by pinfall	Singles match	3:49

=== 2021 ===
The 2021 edition was held on October 15 at the Toyota Arena in Ontario, California. It aired on November 14 on Fox, being the only televised Tribute to the Troops to not air in December.

No.	Results	Stipulations	Times
1	Big E defeated Dolph Ziggler (with Robert Roode) by pinfall	Singles match	4:58
2	Bianca Belair defeated Liv Morgan by pinfall	Singles match	3:53
3	Roman Reigns (with Paul Heyman) defeated Shinsuke Nakamura (with Rick Boogs) by pinfall	Singles match	8:04

=== 2022 ===
The 2022 edition was held on November 11 at the Gainbridge Fieldhouse in Downtown Indianapolis. It aired on December 17 on Fox.

No.	Results	Stipulations	Times
1	Braun Strowman defeated LA Knight by pinfall	Singles match	2:05
2	Ronda Rousey and Shayna Baszler defeated Emma and Tamina by submission	Tag team match	7:34
3	Drew McIntyre, Ricochet, and Sheamus defeated Imperium (Gunther, Giovanni Vinci, and Ludwig Kaiser) by pinfall	Six-man tag team match	16:34

=== 2023 ===
The 2023 edition, which was the final show, was held on December 8 as a special episode of SmackDown on Fox at the Amica Mutual Pavilion in Providence, Rhode Island, and was the only to air live. This was also the first SmackDown to feature CM Punk since 2014, after his return at Survivor Series: WarGames the previous month. Kevin Patrick, Michael Cole, and John "Bradshaw" Layfield (as special guest) were the commentators for the night. CBS college football commentator Brad Nessler was the guest commentator for the match between Bobby Lashley and Karrion Kross.

No.	Results	Stipulations	Times
1	Santos Escobar defeated Dragon Lee by pinfall	WWE United States Championship #1 Contender Tournament first round match	9:09
2	Bobby Lashley defeated Karrion Kross (with Scarlett) by pinfall	WWE United States Championship #1 Contender Tournament first round match	9:46
3	Asuka defeated Charlotte Flair by pinfall	Singles match	6:42
4	LA Knight and Randy Orton defeated The Bloodline (Jimmy Uso and Solo Sikoa) by pinfall	Tag team match	11:34
