= Titan Towers =

Former headquarters of American professional wrestling promotion WWE

1241 East Main Street
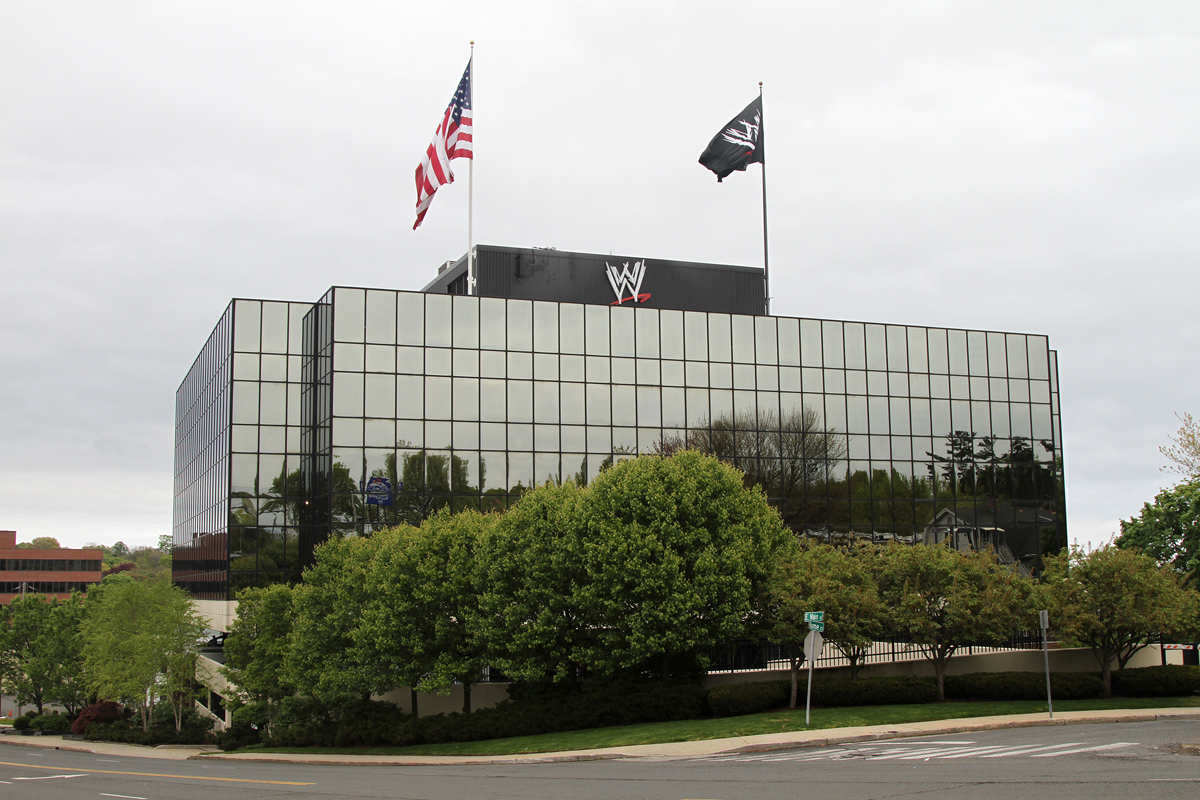
- 1241 East Main Street in 2012

- Location in Connecticut Location in the United States
- Alternative names: Titan Towers; WWE Global Headquarters

General information
- Type: Offices and television studios
- Architectural style: International style
- Location: 1241 East Main Street, Stamford, Connecticut, United States
- Coordinates: 41.0592°N 73.5097°W
- Opened: May 13, 1991; 35 years ago
- Owner: MB Financial Group

Height
- Height: 84.8 ft (25.85 m)

Technical details
- Floor count: 8
- Floor area: 94,248 sq ft (8,800 m^{2})
- Grounds: 1.19 acres (0.48 hectares)

Other information
- Parking: 300

1241 East Main Street, which was also known as Titan Towers, is an office building located in Stamford, Connecticut, United States. It served as the global headquarters for the American professional wrestling and entertainment company WWE from 1991 to 2023. WWE, a subsidiary of TKO Group Holdings (TKO), later moved their global headquarters to Washington Boulevard in Stamford, with TKO establishing its headquarters in New York City.

== History ==
Built in 1981 in Stamford, Connecticut, the 94,248 sq ft (8,800 m^{2}) building consists of four stories of office space and four levels of parking. The building was reopened as the headquarters of the World Wrestling Federation (WWF, later WWE) on May 13, 1991. Prior to the move to Titan Towers, the offices of Titan Sports, the parent company of the WWF, were headquartered at the Cape Cod Coliseum in South Yarmouth, Massachusetts before later moving to Holly Hill Lane in Greenwich, Connecticut and then to 1055 Summer Street in the same town. The main exterior logo of Titan Towers has changed over the years to reflect alterations made to the logo of the WWF/WWE.

According to former WWF executive and on-screen manager Jim Cornette, Vince McMahon's office and the offices of those in charge of wrestling creative were on one side of the building, while Linda McMahon's office and the offices of those in charge of corporate projects were on the other.

On March 20, 2019, WWE announced their intentions to sell Titan Towers, and relocate their headquarters to 677–707 Washington Boulevard in Stamford, Connecticut. It was later reported that after WWE merged with the UFC mixed martial arts promotion in September 2023 to form TKO Group Holdings (TKO), Titan Towers would serve as the headquarters of TKO. These reports were later proven incorrect, with TKO headquarters later being revealed as being located in New York City. The building currently has no affiliation with WWE or TKO, as WWE completed their move to the Washington Boulevard headquarters.

In January 2025, the building was sold to a real estate firm called MB Financial Group for $3.75 million USD. It is to be converted into an apartment complex.

In February 2026, urban explorers illegally entered the building at night, filming a 57-second video of gym, office and kitchen equipment retained, as well as sporadic memorabilia left behind, such as a WrestleMania 31 plaque and an early 2000s copy of WWE Magazine.

== Use in wrestling programming ==
=== 1990s ===
On September 7, 1995, the rooftop of Titan Towers was used for one of the scenes of the opening intro of WWF Monday Night Raw. This scene featured Yokozuna, The Undertaker, Razor Ramon, and several other wrestlers.

In 1999, Titan Towers was featured in a 30-second television commercial that consisted of Stone Cold Steve Austin, Sable, The Rock, Kane, The Undertaker, Mankind, Chyna, and Vince McMahon during Super Bowl XXXIII. That same year, on the June 14 edition of Raw is War, Austin took a kayfabe role as CEO overseeing day-to-day operations within the WWF.

The exterior and interior of the buildings featured in 1999 wrestling documentary, Beyond the Mat.

=== 2000s–2020s ===
During the August 21, 2006, episode of Raw, D-Generation X defaced Titan Towers by tagging the "DX" logo on the building with green spray paint.

In November 2006, Total Nonstop Action Wrestling (TNA) filmed a segment with The James Gang outside the offices for TNA Impact!.

In the build-up to Extreme Rules in 2013, Brock Lesnar and Paul Heyman visited Titan Towers on May 13 in which they vandalized Triple H's office and attacked nearby employees of WWE.

During the COVID-19 pandemic, Titan Towers was briefly used as an alternative location for selected matches during pay-per-views (as opposed to the WWE Performance Center). WrestleMania 36's "Firefly Fun House" match between Bray Wyatt and John Cena was filmed at Titan Towers using props and set pieces in storage. The two eponymous ladder matches at Money in the Bank were also filmed on its premises; the wrestlers began on the ground floor in the lobby and fought their way to the rooftop where a ring was located with the Money in the Bank briefcases suspended above the ring.
