= Kofi Kingston =

Ghanaian-American professional wrestler (born 1981)

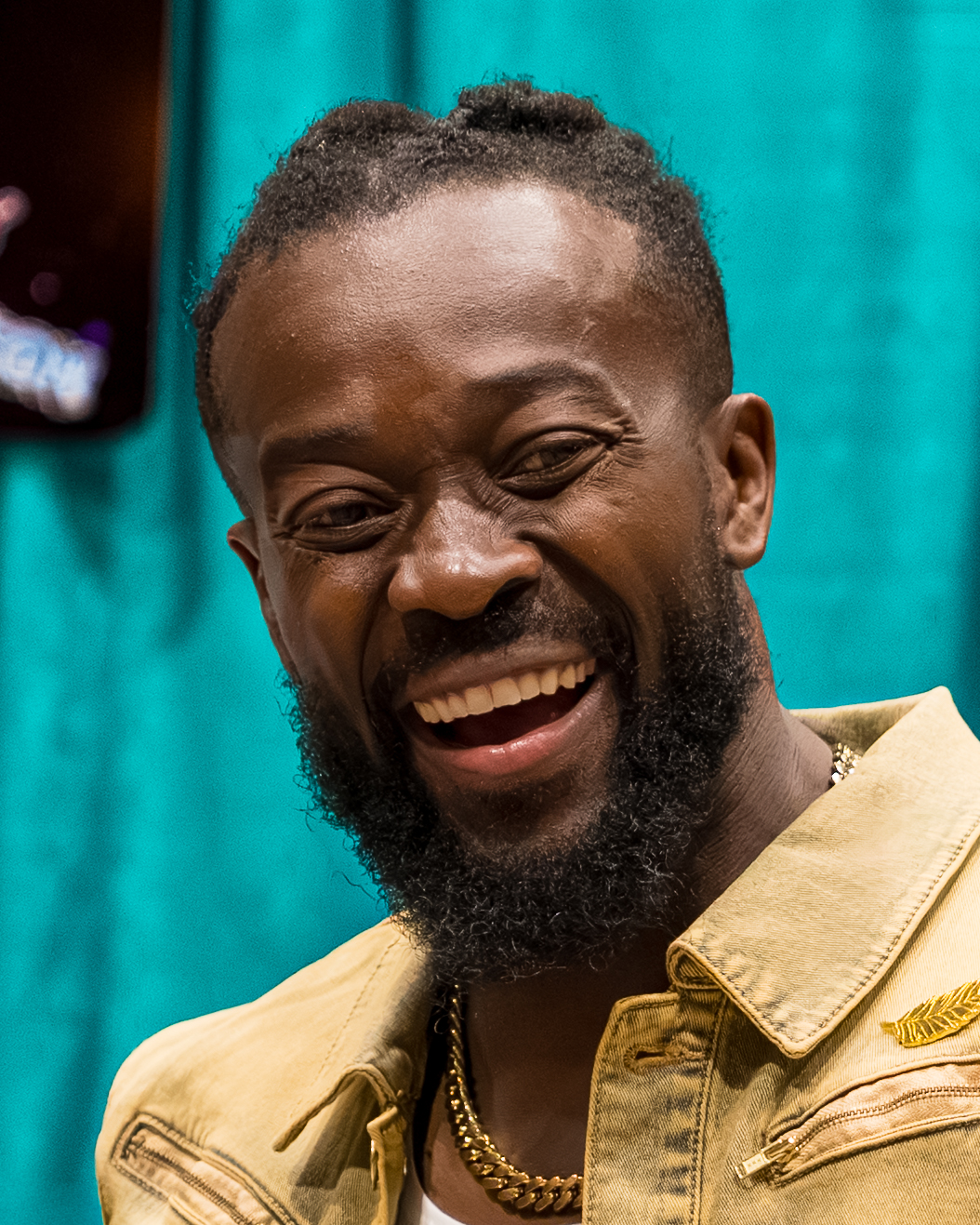
- Kofi in 2026

Personal information
- Citizenship: Ghana; United States
- Born: Kofi Nahaje Sarkodie-Mensah; August 14, 1981 (age 45) Kumasi, Ghana
- Education: Boston College
- Spouse: Kori Campfield (m. 2010)
- Children: 3

Professional wrestling career
- Ring name(s): Kofi; Kofi Kingston; Kofi Nahaje Kingston
- Billed height: 6 ft 0 in (183 cm)
- Billed weight: 212 lb (96 kg)
- Billed from: Ghana, West Africa; Kingston, Jamaica
- Trained by: Chaotic Wrestling; Mike Hollow; Killer Kowalski; Ohio Valley Wrestling
- Debut: 2006

Kofi Nahaje Sarkodie-Mensah (born August 14, 1981) is a Ghanaian and American professional wrestler. He is signed to All Elite Wrestling (AEW), where he performs mononymously as Kofi and is one-half of The New Level with Austin Creed. They are two-thirds of the AEW World Trios Champions with Swerve Strickland. He is best known for his 20-year tenure in WWE from 2006 to 2026, where he performed under the ring name Kofi Kingston.

After graduating from Boston College, he decided to pursue a professional wrestling career, and began performing on the New England independent circuit as a Jamaican wrestler by the name of Kofi Nahaje Kingston. After signing a developmental deal with WWE in 2006, he shortened his ring name to Kofi Kingston. He debuted in WWE's brand ECW (Extreme Championship Wrestling) in 2008 using the same Jamaican character as he did on the independent circuit. In late 2009, he stopped being billed from Jamaica and dropped the accent, although he kept his ring name. He then started being billed from his home country of Ghana.

From 2008 to 2013, Kingston became a four-time Intercontinental Champion, a three-time United States Champion, a one-time World Tag Team Champion with CM Punk, and a two-time WWE Tag Team Champion with Evan Bourne and R-Truth. In 2014, he formed The New Day with Big E and Xavier Woods. The trio went on to break the record for the longest tag team championship reign in WWE history when they held the WWE (Raw) Tag Team Championship from August 2015 to December 2016, defending the titles under the Freebird rule. In total, Kingston is a 16-time tag team champion in WWE. In April 2019, Kingston defeated Daniel Bryan at WrestleMania 35 to win the WWE Championship, giving him 24 total championships in WWE.

He is the first, and currently only, African-born world champion in WWE history. His WWE Championship win also made him WWE's 30th Triple Crown Champion and 20th overall Grand Slam Champion (13th under the current format). With his NXT Tag Team Championship win in 2022, Kingston also became a Tag Team Triple Crown Champion, becoming the first wrestler to have won both the traditional and tag team version of the WWE Triple Crown, as well as having the most overall reigns with a WWE-branded tag team championship with 16. With the exception of a few months spent as a villain in 2015 and his last run as a villain with The New Day, Kingston has been a heroic character for almost the entirety of his WWE career. He has also gained distinction for his numerous methods of avoiding elimination during the Royal Rumble.

== Early life ==
Kofi Nahaje Sarkodie-Mensah was born in Kumasi in the Ashanti Region of Ghana on August 14, 1981, to Kwasi and Elizabeth Sarkodie-Mensah. He has a brother, Kwame (who is a Twitch streamer under the name Temp0), and a late sister, Nana Akua. He moved with his family to the United States and eventually settled in the greater Boston area, where he graduated from Winchester High School in Winchester, Massachusetts, and then Boston College, majoring in communications.

== Professional wrestling career ==
=== Training and early career (2005–2006) ===
Sarkodie-Mensah started training in late 2005 and made his official wrestling debut in 2006 for Chaotic Wrestling, when he faced Evan Siks on June 4 for the PWF Mayhem Heavyweight Championship in a losing effort. He competed primarily in the New England area, including stints in National Wrestling Alliance (NWA) – New England (where he was briefly a member of Barry Ace's "A-List"), Millennium Wrestling Federation (MWF), New England Championship Wrestling (NECW), the Eastern Wrestling Alliance (EWA), and Chaotic Wrestling.

=== World Wrestling Entertainment / WWE (2006–2026) ===
==== Developmental territories (2006–2007) ====
In September 2006, he signed a developmental contract with World Wrestling Entertainment (WWE) and was assigned to Deep South Wrestling (DSW), a Georgia-based developmental federation. He debuted in the new company, as Kofi Nahaje Kingston, in a dark match loss to Montel Vontavious Porter on September 21. For the rest of 2006 and the beginning of 2007, he appeared in DSW, as well as its Kentucky-based sister promotion Ohio Valley Wrestling (OVW), where he was in a tag team dubbed the Commonwealth Connection with Harry Smith.

In 2007, under the ring name Kofi Nahaje Kingston, he had his first exposure to the main WWE roster, when he worked dark matches on March 5 and 26 before episodes of Raw against Charlie Haas and Trevor Murdoch, respectively. When he returned to the developmental federations, he shortened his original ring name to Kofi Kingston and continued to alternate between both ring names throughout his duration there. He also worked live events, defeating Shelton Benjamin on May 5, and Val Venis on May 6. When the Florida-based developmental territory Florida Championship Wrestling (FCW) opened in June, Kingston was relocated there, appearing at their inaugural show on June 26 where he teamed with Eric Pérez against Keith Walker and Rycklon Stephens in a losing effort. Kingston worked there for most of the remainder of the year.

==== Intercontinental Champion (2008–2009) ====
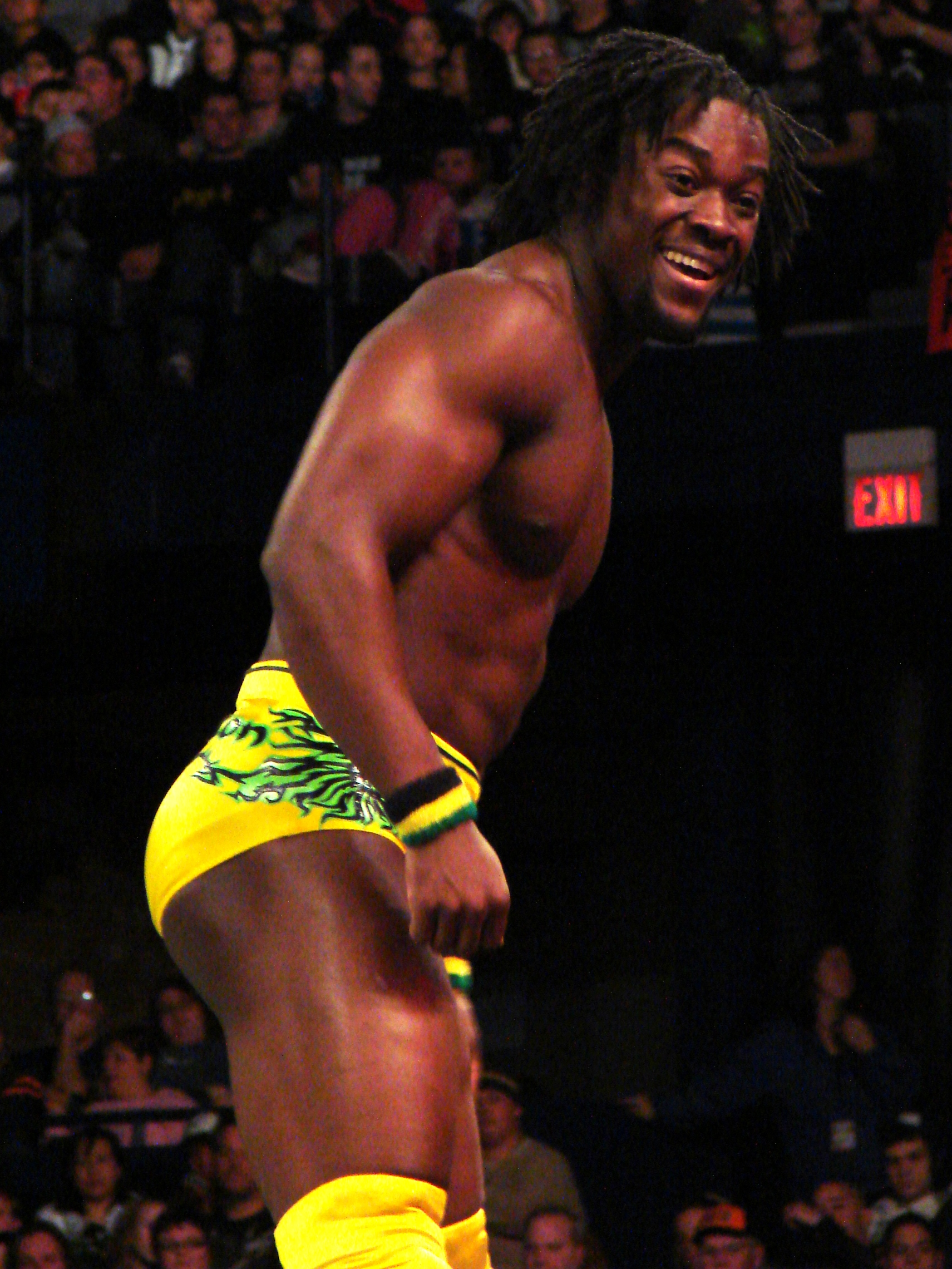
Kingston in March 2008

A series of vignettes for Kingston's television debut began airing on the weekly ECW television show starting on December 6, 2007. During this introduction phase, his videos, the official website and commentators noted he would be the first Jamaican to wrestle for WWE, but he does not have any Jamaican ancestry, nor any connection to Jamaica. (Note: Kingston's Jamaican gimmick actually predates his tenure in WWE, and was developed when he was training in Boston. He had been constantly listening to Damian Marley's Welcome to Jamrock around this time, and decided to test out a Jamaican character in promo class with guest trainer Ric Flair. Shortly afterwards, he had a tryout at his training school in which WWE talent scouts noted that the Jamaican character had not been done before.) He is, however, the first African-born performer in WWE history. He debuted on the January 22, 2008 ECW as a face with a win over local wrestler David Owen in Charlottesville, Virginia. After wrestling sporadic matches, Kingston was involved in his first major match, a 24-man battle royal during the WrestleMania XXIV pre-show on March 30 with the winner receiving an ECW Championship match, but was eliminated by Mark Henry. Kingston remained undefeated in singles competition in ECW for months and was placed into a feud with Shelton Benjamin at the end of April 2008. After two straight losses, Benjamin got a win over Kingston on the May 20 ECW, ending his undefeated streak. On the June 24 ECW, Kingston defeated Benjamin in an Extreme Rules match to end their feud.

On June 25, Kingston was drafted to the Raw brand, as part of the WWE Supplemental Draft. In his first match as a member of Raw roster, and first championship match in WWE, he defeated Chris Jericho for the Intercontinental Championship at Night of Champions on June 29, after Shawn Michaels, whom Jericho was feuding with, attacked Jericho's manager Lance Cade. The win made him the first African-born wrestler to hold a championship in World Wrestling Entertainment. Kingston held the championship until SummerSlam on August 17, where he and Women's Champion Mickie James both lost their championships in an intergender "winner take all" tag team match to Santino Marella and Beth Phoenix.

At Unforgiven on September 7, he appeared backstage, coming to the aid of then-World Heavyweight Champion CM Punk, who had been attacked by Randy Orton, Manu, and the World Tag Team Champions Cody Rhodes and Ted DiBiase. Soon after coming to his rescue, Kingston and Punk were paired together more often, and on the October 27 episode of Raw, the duo won the World Tag Team Championship. He was also involved at Survivor Series on November 23 in the traditional ten-men elimination tag team match on the side of Team Batista, but was eliminated by Randy Orton. Kingston and Punk lost the World Tag Team Championship to John Morrison and The Miz at a live event on December 13. At No Way Out on February 15, 2009, Kingston was scheduled to compete in the World Heavyweight Championship Elimination Chamber match but was unable to officially enter the match as he was ambushed by Edge, who took Kingston's place and eventually won the match. On the March 9 episode of Raw, Kingston defeated Chris Jericho after interference from Ric Flair, to earn a spot in the Money in the Bank ladder match at WrestleMania 25 on April 5, but the match was won by CM Punk.

==== United States Champion (2009–2010) ====
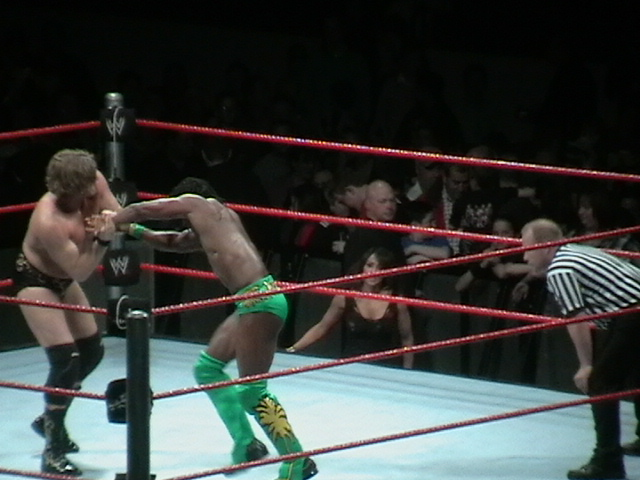
Kingston wrestling William Regal in April 2009

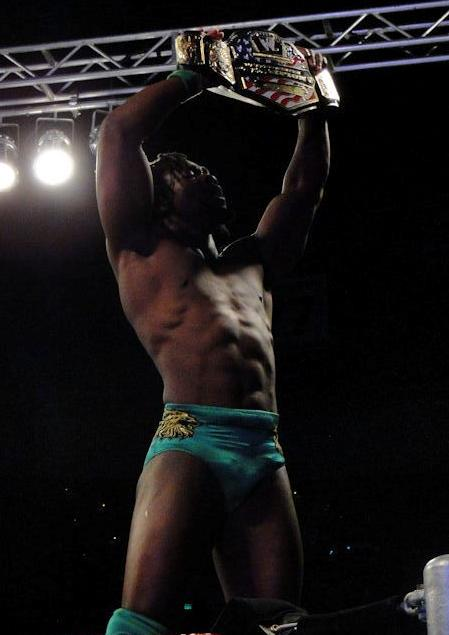
Kingston as WWE United States Champion

After winning a triple threat number one contender's match the week before, Kingston defeated Montel Vontavious Porter (MVP) on the June 1 episode of Raw to win the United States Championship for the first time. For the next several months, he went on to defend and retain the title at Extreme Rules on June 7 against Matt Hardy, MVP and William Regal in a Fatal 4-Way match, Night of Champions on July 26 against Primo, MVP, Carlito, Jack Swagger and The Miz in a Six Pack Challenge, Breaking Point on September 13 against The Miz, and Hell in a Cell on October 4 against The Miz and Jack Swagger in a Triple Threat match, until losing the championship to The Miz on the October 5 episode of Raw, ending his reign at 126 days.

On the October 19 episode of Raw, Kingston spoke without a Jamaican accent during a televised segment, dropped the Jamaican character and began being billed from his home country of Ghana. At Bragging Rights on October 25, Kingston wrestled as part of the Team Raw, which lost the match after Raw teammate Big Show betrayed them by chokeslamming Kingston, allowing Chris Jericho to pin Kingston to pick up the win for Team SmackDown. After Kingston interfered in a One Hour, Anything Goes Iron Man match for the WWE Championship between Randy Orton and John Cena later that night, Orton and Kingston feuded, including a 5-men Survivor Series match at Survivor Series on November 22 where Kingston's team won after he was the sole survivor, last eliminating Orton. The feud continued through TLC: Tables, Ladders & Chairs on December 12, where Orton defeated Kingston. They also participated in a triple threat match on the January 11, 2010 episode of Raw which included John Cena to determined a challenger for the WWE Championship at the Royal Rumble, which was won by Orton, who pinned Kingston. Around a week earlier, on the January 4, 2010 episode of Raw, Kingston botched the finish of a match with Orton, and kept getting up despite the plan having been to take a punt kick on the ground from Orton. Orton was reportedly insulted by this, delivered a stiff RKO, and Kingston reportedly had a push stopped following complaints from Orton. He would remain a mid-carder for the next decade. He competed in the Elimination Chamber match for the WWE Championship at Elimination Chamber on February 21, but was eliminated by the champion Sheamus. At WrestleMania XXVI on March 28, Kingston was unsuccessful in the Money in the Bank match, which was won by Jack Swagger.

==== Championship reigns (2010–2011) ====
On the April 26 episode of Raw, Kingston was drafted to the SmackDown brand as part of the WWE draft. He would win a tournament for the vacant Intercontinental Championship on the May 14 episode of SmackDown. However, moments later, the title win was reversed when the title was returned to the previous champion Drew McIntyre. Kingston would defeat McIntyre for the title at Over the Limit on May 23, and retained in a rematch at Fatal 4-Way on June 20. On July 18 at Money in the Bank, Kingston lost the SmackDown Money in the Bank ladder match when Kane grabbed the briefcase. His Intercontinental reign would end on the August 6 episode of SmackDown, where he lost it against Dolph Ziggler. Kingston would have three title rematches at SummerSlam on August 15, the August 27 episode of SmackDown, and Night of Champions on September 19, but he did not win the title.

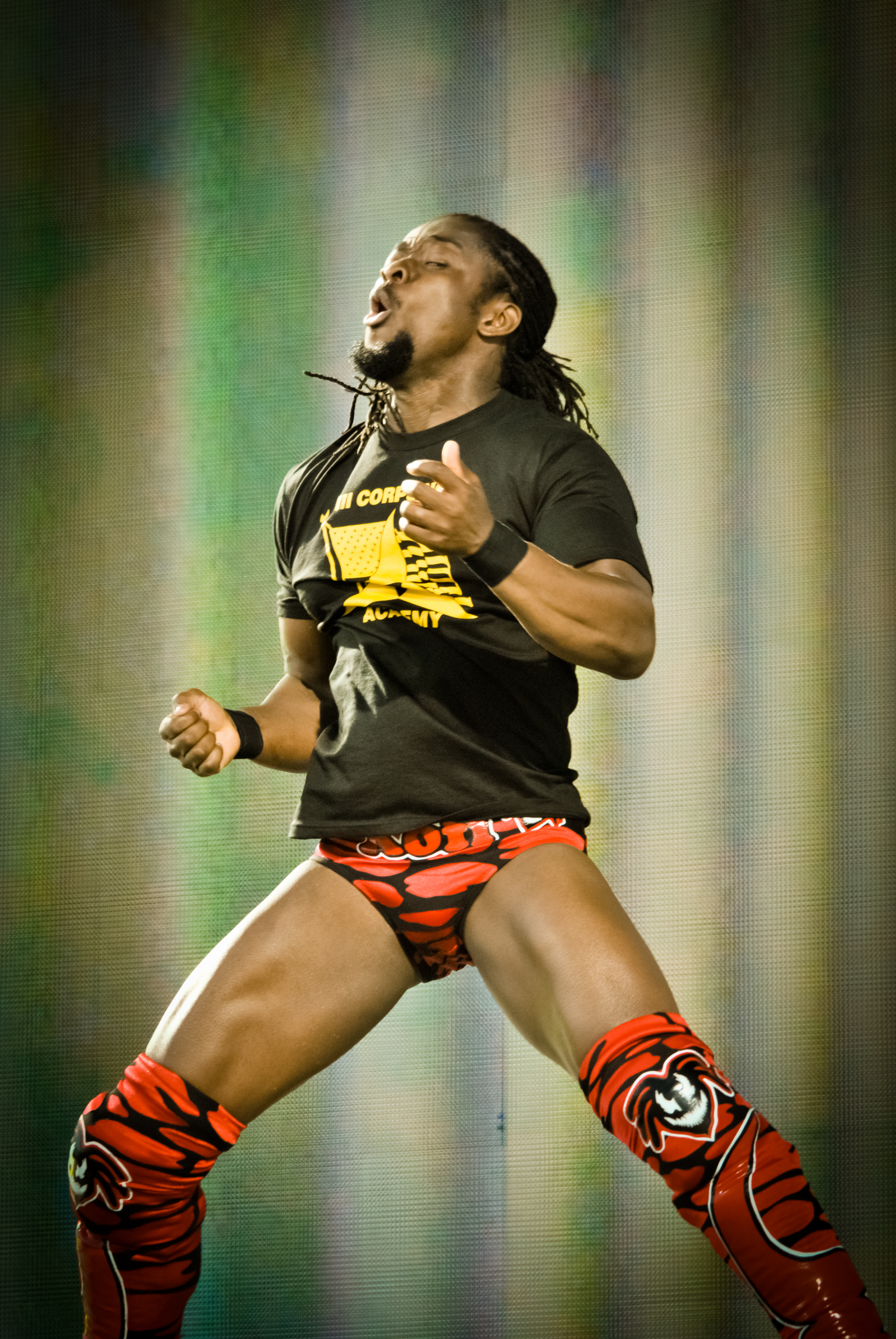
Kingston in December 2010

On the October 15 episode of SmackDown, Kingston defeated Drew McIntyre to earn a spot on Team SmackDown at Bragging Rights on October 24. At Bragging Rights, Team SmackDown defeated Team Raw. On the December 3 episode of SmackDown, Kingston defeated Jack Swagger to become the number one contender for the Intercontinental Championship, but failed to win back the title when Swagger attacked him during the match. At TLC: Tables, Ladders & Chairs on December 19, Kingston competed in a triple threat ladder match for the Intercontinental Championship, which was won again by Ziggler. On the January 7, 2011, episode of SmackDown, Kingston defeated Ziggler to become the Intercontinental Champion for a third time. Immediately following the match, acting General Manager Vickie Guerrero ordered that Ziggler invoke his rematch clause straight away, but Kingston quickly pinned Ziggler again to retain his championship. Kingston then moved into a feud with Alberto Del Rio, which culminated in a non-title match at Elimination Chamber on February 20, which Kingston lost. On the March 25 episode of SmackDown, Kingston lost the Intercontinental Championship to Wade Barrett. On the April 1 episode of SmackDown, Kingston won his rematch against Wade Barrett by disqualification. At WrestleMania XXVII on April 3, after Vladimir Kozlov was injured at the hands of The Corre, Kingston was chosen as Kozlov's replacement in an eight-man tag team match involving Kingston, Kane, Big Show, and Santino Marella versus The Corre, which Kingston's team won.

On April 26, Kingston was drafted back to the Raw brand as part of the 2011 Supplemental Draft. At Extreme Rules on May 1, Kingston defeated Sheamus in a Tables match to win his second United States Championship. On the May 9 episode of Raw, Kingston successfully defended his championship against Jack Swagger. At Capitol Punishment on June 19, Kingston lost the title to Dolph Ziggler. Kingston faced Ziggler in a rematch for the title on the June 20 episode of Raw in a 2-out-of-3 falls match, but Ziggler retained the championship as the match ended with Ziggler being disqualified.

==== Air Boom and teaming with R-Truth (2011–2012) ====
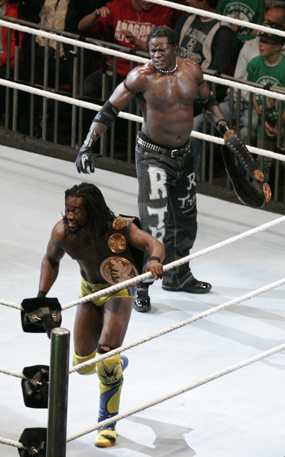
Kingston (front) and R-Truth as WWE Tag Team Champions

On the August 22 episode of Raw, Kingston and Evan Bourne won the WWE Tag Team Championship when they defeated David Otunga and Michael McGillicutty. On the August 29 Raw SuperShow, the duo was called "Air Boom", and they had their first successful title defense when they defeated Otunga and McGillicutty in a rematch. At Night of Champions on September 18, Air Boom retained their titles against The Miz and R-Truth by disqualification after Miz attacked a WWE referee. At Hell in a Cell on October 2 and Vengeance on October 23, Air Boom retained their titles twice against Dolph Ziggler and Jack Swagger. Bourne was suspended throughout November for his first violation of the company's Wellness policy.

At TLC: Tables, Ladders & Chairs on December 18, Air Boom successfully retained their titles against Primo & Epico. On January 15, 2012, Air Boom lost the Tag Team titles to Primo and Epico at a house show. The following night on Raw SuperShow, Air Boom were awarded a rematch but failed to regain the titles. The following day, Bourne was suspended again for his second violation of WWE's Wellness Policy.

At the Royal Rumble on January 29, Kingston participated in the Royal Rumble match and although he did not win, he had a stand-out moment when he saved himself from elimination by walking on his hands to reach the ring steps and re-enter the ring. At Elimination Chamber on February 19, Kingston failed to capture the WWE Championship after being eliminated third by Chris Jericho. Kingston then began teaming with R-Truth. On the February 27 Raw SuperShow, Kingston and Truth failed to capture the WWE Tag Team Championship from Primo and Epico in a Triple Threat Tag Team Match, also involving Ziggler and Swagger. On the April 30 Raw SuperShow, Kingston and Truth defeated Primo and Epico to win the WWE Tag Team Championship. At Over the Limit on May 20, Kingston and R-Truth successfully defended the titles against Dolph Ziggler and Jack Swagger and then again in a rematch on the May 28 Raw SuperShow.

On the July 16 Raw SuperShow, they successfully defended the WWE Tag Team Championship against The Prime Time Players (Titus O'Neil and Darren Young). At SummerSlam on August 19, Kingston and Truth defeated the Prime Time Players to retain the WWE Tag Team Championship. At Night of Champions on September 16, Kingston and Truth lost the WWE Tag Team Championship to the team of Daniel Bryan and Kane and failed to regain the titles from the new champions the following night on Raw. Both Kingston and Truth were defeated by The Prime Time Players in the first round of the Tag Team Tournament to determine the number one contenders for the Tag Team Championships, causing both Kingston and R-Truth to disband as a team and each returning to being single competitors.

==== Multiple championship victories (2012–2014) ====
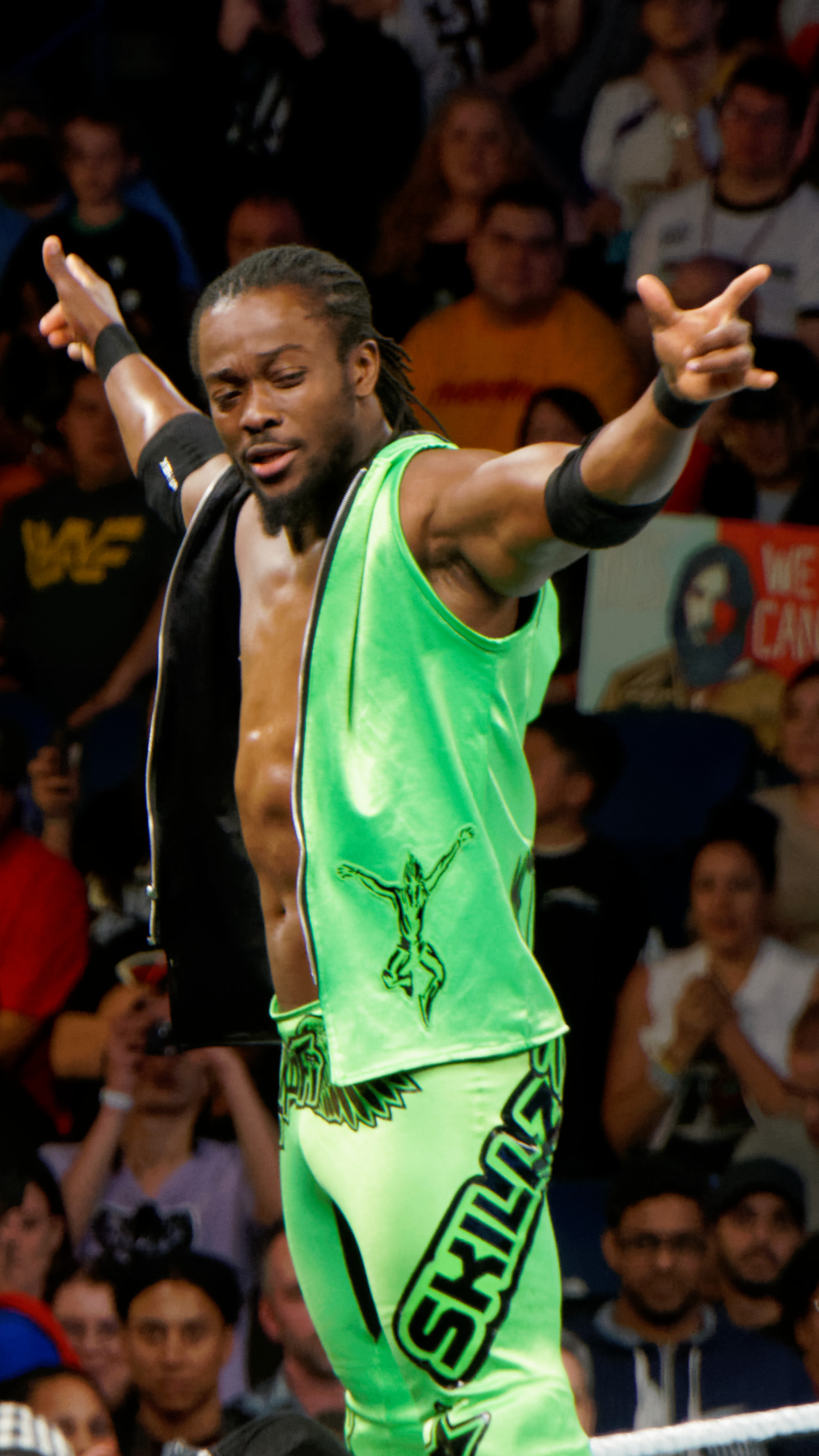
Kingston in April 2014

On the October 17 episode of Main Event, Kingston defeated The Miz to win the WWE Intercontinental Championship for the fourth time in his career. Kingston then began feuding with Wade Barrett, when the two were placed on opposing teams in the traditional five-on-five elimination tag team match on November 18 at Survivor Series. Kingston's team, led by Mick Foley, was defeated by Barrett's team, led by Dolph Ziggler, during which he was eliminated by Barrett. The following night on Raw, Kingston was defeated by Barrett in a non-title match. Kingston, still the Intercontinental Champion, received a shot at the United States Championship on the December 3 episode of Raw against Barrett, R-Truth, and the champion Antonio Cesaro in a fatal four-way match, but was unsuccessful after Cesaro pinned Kingston for the win. At TLC: Tables, Ladders & Chairs on December 16, Kingston successfully defended his title against Barrett. Two weeks later on the December 31 episode of Raw, Kingston lost the Intercontinental Championship to Barrett, ending his reign at 74 days. Kingston received his rematch four days later on the January 4, 2013 episode of SmackDown, but lost the match. On January 27 at the Royal Rumble, Kingston participated in the Royal Rumble match, and after eliminating Tensai, he was pushed out of the ring, but Kingston jumped on Tensai's back, landed on the announce table and used a commentary chair from John "Bradshaw" Layfield (JBL) to hop to the ring apron, before being eliminated by Cody Rhodes.

On the April 15 episode of Raw, Kingston defeated Antonio Cesaro to win his third United States Championship but lost it on May 19 at Extreme Rules to Dean Ambrose. On the May 31 episode of SmackDown, Kingston was written out of television, as he was undergoing elbow surgery and was expected to be out for four to eight weeks. Kingston returned from injury on the August 5 episode of Raw, defeating Fandango. At Night of Champions on September 15, Kingston faced Curtis Axel for the Intercontinental Championship, but was defeated. In the following weeks, Bray Wyatt would start delivering cryptic messages to Kingston after his matches, leading to a match between the two at Battleground on October 6, which Wyatt won. On the November 18 episode of Raw, Kingston teamed with The Miz to face The Real Americans (Antonio Cesaro and Jack Swagger), but they lost after The Miz turned on Kingston. This led to a match at Survivor Series on November 24, where Kingston was defeated by The Miz. In the upcoming weeks, the feud continued and culminated in a no disqualification match between the two at TLC: Tables, Ladders & Chairs on December 15, which Kingston won.

At the Royal Rumble on January 26, 2014, Kingston participated in the Royal Rumble match, where he avoided elimination by landing on the crowd barricade and made an 11-foot jump to get back in the ring, but he was later eliminated by Roman Reigns. At WrestleMania XXX on April 6, Kingston competed in the André the Giant Memorial Battle Royal, where he would have a standout moment in the match, getting thrown over the turnbuckles by Cesaro and to avoid elimination by keeping his toes on the steel steps, he would later be eliminated by Sheamus. At Battleground on July 20, Kingston competed in the Battle Royal for the Intercontinental Championship, but failed to win the match.

==== Formation of The New Day (2014–2018) ====
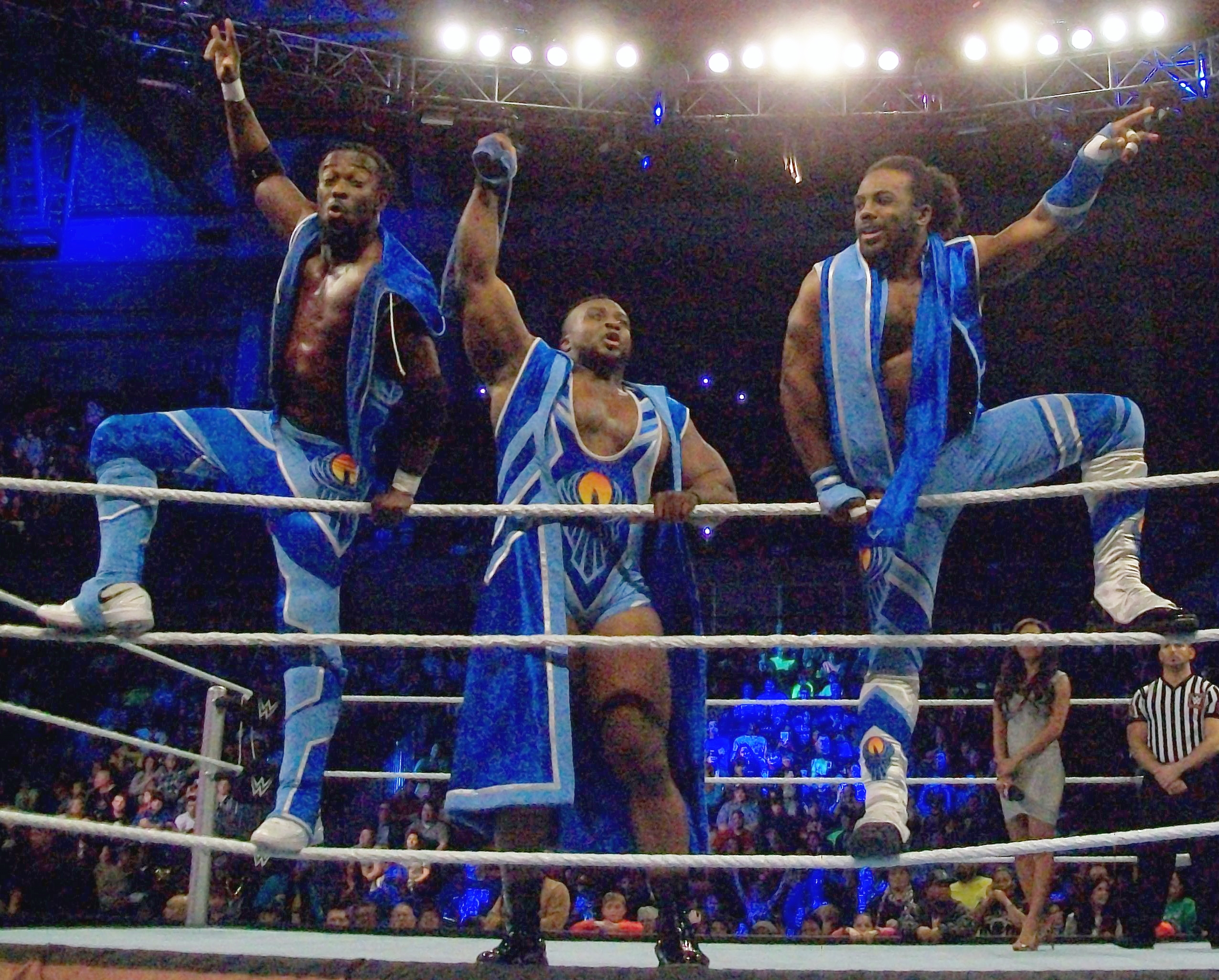
Kingston with Big E and Xavier Woods as The New Day in January 2015

During the summer, Kingston was put in a team with Big E, and on the July 21 episode of Raw, they lost a tag team match against Ryback and Curtis Axel (known as RybAxel) in what had been a recent losing streak. Xavier Woods then came down to the ring to address them by stating that they could not "move ahead by kissing babies, shaking hands, and singing and dancing like a puppet", and that now is their time to "find purpose" and that they "do not ask any longer", but "take", and offered to form a stable. The duo accepted Woods' offer, and on the next day's Main Event, Woods managed Big E and Kingston to a decisive victory over Heath Slater and Titus O'Neil, (Slater-Gator). The trio then temporarily separated as on the August 8 episode of SmackDown, both Big E and Kingston reverted to wrestling singles matches with no sign or mention of the other two members of the group. Despite being separated on WWE television, Big E, Kingston and Woods continued their alliance at house shows.

In November, WWE began airing vignettes for Kingston, Woods and Big E, with the stable now being billed as The New Day, and presented as overly-positive-minded babyfaces. They made their in-ring debut as a stable on the November 28 episode of SmackDown in a winning effort against Curtis Axel, Heath Slater and Titus O'Neil. They started a brief feud with Gold and Stardust, which Kingston and Big E defeated Gold and Stardust at the TLC: Tables, Ladders & Chairs pre-show on December 14. At the WrestleMania 31 pre-show on March 29, 2015, they failed to win the WWE Tag Team Championship in a fatal four-way match as well as being eliminated by Big Show in the Andre the Giant Memorial Battle Royal.

On the April 6 episode of Raw, The New Day turned heel, which would mark Kingston's first heel turn in WWE ever since debuting in 2008. At Extreme Rules on April 26, Kingston and Big E defeated Tyson Kidd and Cesaro to win the WWE Tag Team Championships. At Payback on May 17, The New Day defeated Kidd and Cesaro to retain their titles. At Elimination Chamber on May 31, The New Day defeated Kidd and Cesaro, The Lucha Dragons, The Ascension, Los Matadores, and the Prime Time Players to retain their titles in the first ever tag team Elimination Chamber match; all three members were allowed to compete in a pre-match stipulation. However, they lost the titles at Money in the Bank on June 14 against The Prime Time Players. However, they would regain the titles at SummerSlam on August 23. The following night on Raw, The Dudley Boyz made their WWE return and attacked the New Day with Woods being put through a table with the 3D. New Day lost to the Dudley Boyz via disqualification at Night of Champions on September 20 but retained their tag team titles. The next month, at Hell in a Cell on October 25, they defeated the Dudley Boyz to retain their titles. At TLC: Tables, Ladders & Chairs on December 13, The New Day retained the title against The Usos and The Lucha Dragons in a Triple threat tag team ladder match. The New Day retained the titles at Royal Rumble against The Usos.

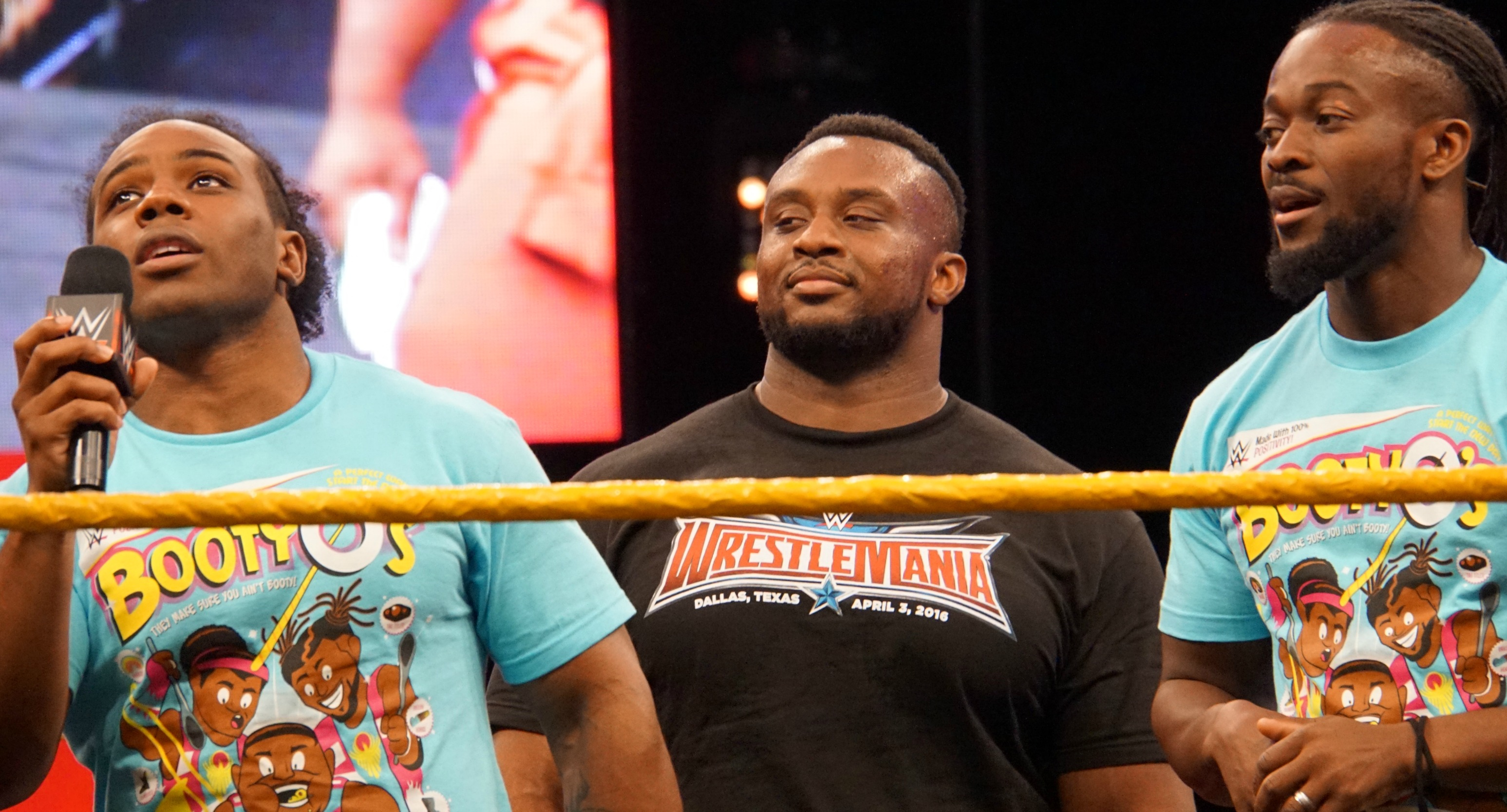
The New Day during the WrestleMania Axxess in April 2016

At Fastlane on February 21, 2016, The New Day turned face by mocking The League of Nations, starting a feud. They retained their titles at Roadblock on March 12 against The League of Nations. At WrestleMania 32 on April 3, The New Day were defeated by The League of Nations in a six-man tag team match. The following night on Raw, they successfully retained their title against The League of Nations, ending their feud. After WrestleMania, they retained their title at Extreme Rules on May 22 against The Vaudevillains, and at Money in the Bank on June 19 against Gallows and Anderson, The Vaudevillains and Enzo Amore and Big Cass in a Fatal-4 Way Tag Team match.

On July 19 at the 2016 WWE draft, Kingston, along with his fellow The New Day teammates, was drafted to Raw. Three days later, on July 22, Kingston, along with Big E and Xavier Woods, became the longest reigning WWE Tag Team Champions in history, breaking the record of 331 days previously set by Paul London and Brian Kendrick. After SmackDown established the SmackDown Tag Team Championship after the brand split, the titles held by The New Day were renamed the Raw Tag Team Championship. They would retain the titles against Gallows and Anderson at SummerSlam on August 21 and Clash of Champions on September 25. Their reign ended at Roadblock: End of the Line on December 18, where they lost the title to Cesaro and Sheamus, thus ending their record breaking championship reign at 483 days.

On January 29, 2017, Kingston participated in the Royal Rumble match in which he was standing on the top-rope when Baron Corbin tried to push him backwards to eliminate him from the match. Instead, he fell directly behind the ring post, grabbed on to the top rope of it and managed to hang on. The New Day were revealed to be the hosts of WrestleMania 33. The night after WrestleMania on Raw, The New Day issued an open challenge to any team which was accepted by The Revival, who were moved up from NXT, and lost to them. After the match, Revival attacked Kofi Kingston. On April 10, it was announced that Kingston had suffered an ankle injury due to the attack of Revival which would require surgery.

On April 11, 2017, The New Day were moved to the SmackDown brand as part of the Superstar Shake-up. The New Day debuted on "Talking Smack", the post-show for SmackDown Live on May 23, however, they did not wrestle or make an appearance on SmackDown Live itself due to Kingston's injury. The New Day made their official return on May 30 episode of SmackDown Live, announcing their objective to defeat The Usos and win the SmackDown Tag Team Championship. The two teams faced off at Money in the Bank, where Big E and Kingston emerged victorious when The Usos purposely got themselves counted out, thus keeping their titles. A rematch took place at Battleground, where Kingston and Woods were successful in capturing the titles, thus making Kingston the first wrestler to hold the SmackDown Tag Team Championship, Raw Tag Team Championship (both its previous and current incarnations), and the original World Tag Team Championship. A month later at the SummerSlam pre-show, however, The New Day (represented by Big E and Woods) dropped the titles back to The Usos, ending their reign at 28 days. On September 12 at the episode promoted as Sin City SmackDown, Kingston and Big E represented New Day and defeated The Usos to win back the championship for their second reign in a "Sin City Street Fight", but lost them again to The Usos at Hell in a Cell. On the October 23 episode of Raw, The New Day along with other talent of SmackDown ambushed the Raw locker room. They again appeared on the November 6 episode of Raw in the crowd, which led to distraction of Seth Rollins and Dean Ambrose and costing them the tag titles. On the November 14 episode of SmackDown Live, The Shield led an attack with Raw Superstars and invaded SmackDown similar to the one led by SmackDown and attacked everyone including The New Day. At Survivor Series, The New Day was defeated by The Shield. The New Day failed to regain the titles from The Usos at Clash of Champions in a Fatal-4-Way tag team match also involving the team of Rusev and Aiden English, and Chad Gable and Shelton Benjamin.

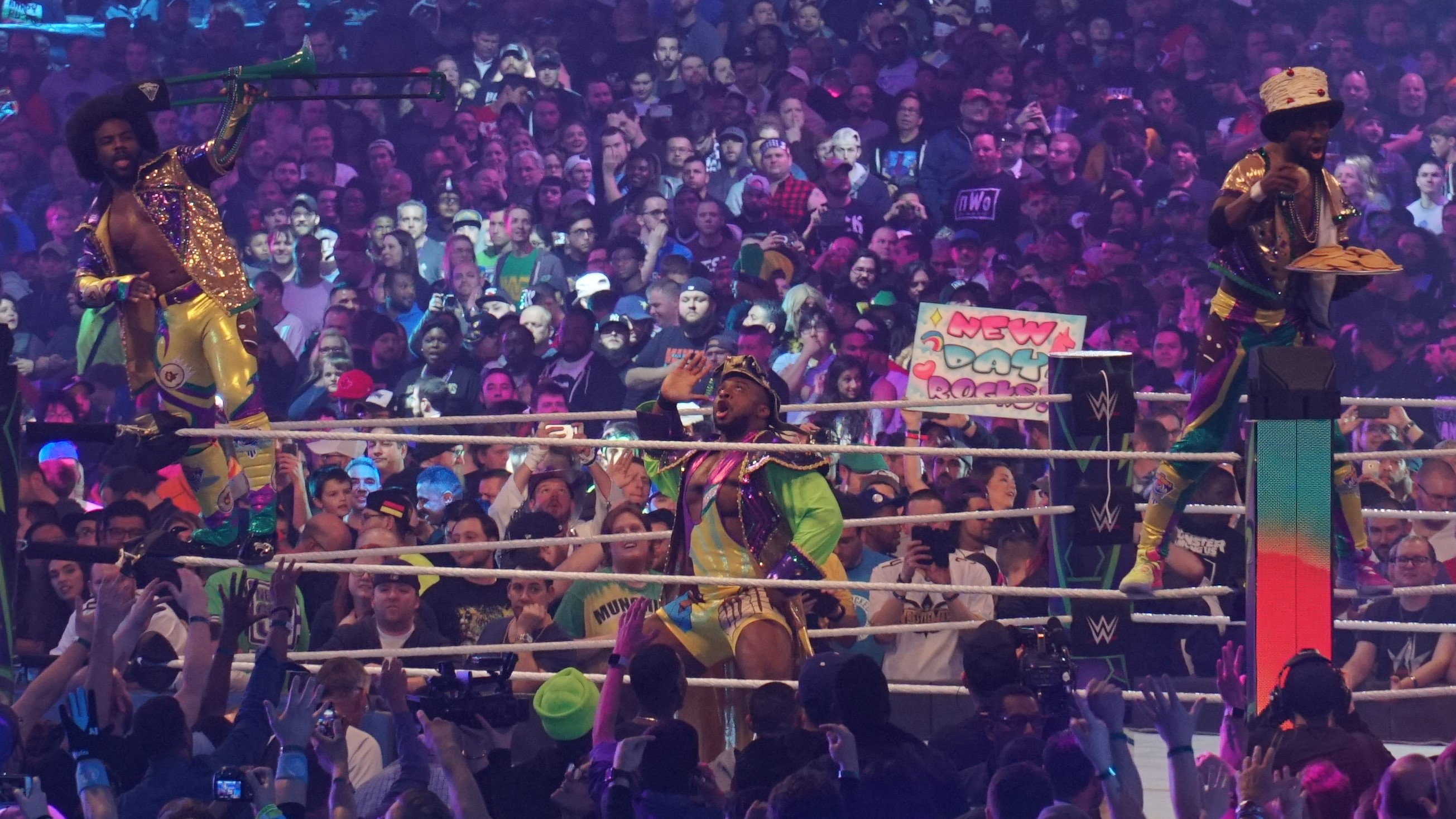
The New Day at WrestleMania 34 in April 2018

At the Royal Rumble on January 28, 2018, Kingston entered the match as the 16th entrant, but was eliminated by Andrade "Cien" Almas. At Fastlane, The New Day faced The Usos for the Smackdown Tag Team Championships, but went to a no contest after interference from The Bludgeon Brothers. Two weeks later, it was confirmed that at WrestleMania 34, The New Day would face The Usos and The Bludgeon Brothers in a Triple Threat tag team match for the Smackdown Tag Team Championships. The New Day failed to capture the titles at the WrestleMania, which were won by The Bludgeon Brothers. On the April 11 episode of SmackDown Live, The New Day were defeated by The Usos in a match to determine which team would challenge The Bludgeon Brothers at the Greatest Royal Rumble event. The New Day competed in a tag team tournament, defeating Sanity in the first round, while The Bar (Cesaro and Sheamus) defeated The Usos. The New Day then defeated The Bar the following week on SmackDown Live to earn the right to face The Bludgeon Brothers at SummerSlam, where they won the match by disqualification, meaning The Bludgeon Brothers retained their titles. Two days later on SmackDown Live, however, The New Day defeated The Bludgeon Brothers in a no disqualification match to capture the titles for a third time. At Hell in a Cell, The New Day successfully defeated Rusev and Aiden English to retain the titles. A few weeks later on October 6, at Super Show-Down, The New Day again retained their titles by defeating The Bar. At SmackDown 1000, The New Day lost their titles against The Bar. They would fail to regain the titles at Crown Jewel event.

In November 2018, The New Day made up part of "Team SmackDown" in a five-versus-five tag-team elimination match at Survivor Series, in which they defeated Team Raw. At TLC: Tables, Ladders & Chairs, The New Day failed to win the championship from The Bar, in a triple-threat tag team match, also involving The Usos.

==== KofiMania and WWE Champion (2019) ====
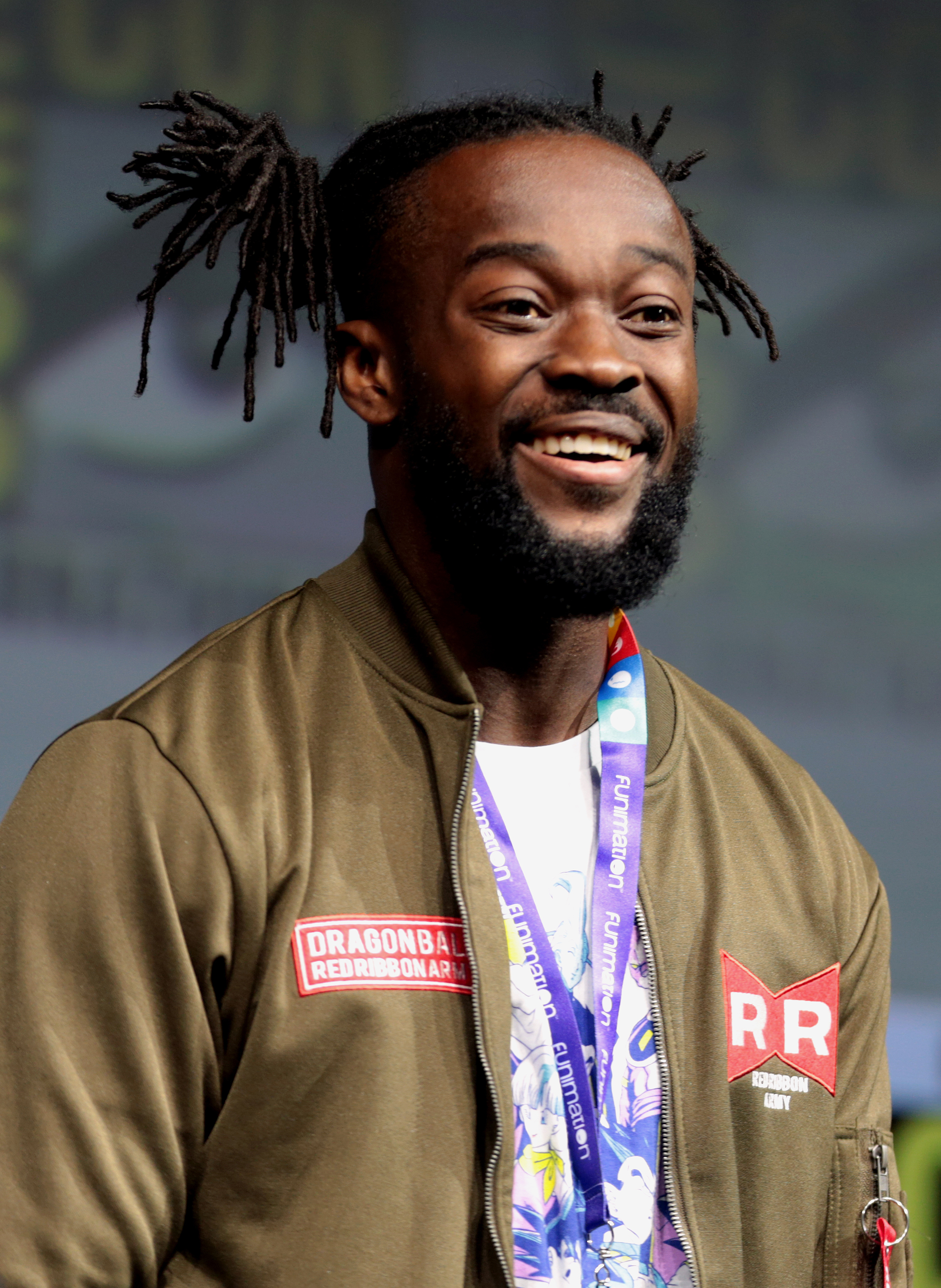
Kofi in 2018

At Royal Rumble, Kingston was eliminated by Drew McIntyre. On the February 12, 2019 episode of SmackDown Live, Kingston was selected to replace Mustafa Ali in the WWE Championship Elimination Chamber match at the namesake pay–per–view after Ali suffered an injury. While Kingston lost the Elimination Chamber match against Bryan, his good performance during a one-hour gauntlet match on SmackDown and the Elimination Chamber translated in a huge support by the public. The following months, Kingston was involved in a storyline during the road to WrestleMania, known as KofiMania, where he tried to win the WWE Championship, but Mr. McMahon repeatedly put obstacles in his way. At Fastlane, Kingston was apparently granted a title match by McMahon, but it was instead a handicap match against The Bar, which Kingston subsequently lost. After Fastlane, Mr. McMahon told Kingston he would earn a WWE Championship match at WrestleMania if he beat Sheamus, Cesaro, Rowan, Samoa Joe, and Randy Orton in another gauntlet match, but after Kingston succeeded in beating the five men, McMahon inserted Daniel Bryan in the match who would defeat him. In what was the last chance for Kingston, McMahon announced a gauntlet match for Big E and Xavier Woods, who were able to defeat five other teams, including Bryan and Rowan to give Kingston his championship match against Bryan at WrestleMania 35. At WrestleMania, Kingston defeated Bryan and won the WWE Championship for the first time, becoming the first African-born WWE Champion in history and his first world championship win in his career, as well as WWE's 30th Triple Crown and 20th Grand Slam champion.

Kingston then successfully defended the title against Daniel Bryan on the May 6 episode of Raw, and against Kevin Owens at Money in the Bank. Kingston then started a feud with the returning Dolph Ziggler, retaining the title at Super ShowDown in a singles match and at Stomping Grounds in a steel cage match. At Extreme Rules, he retained the championship against Samoa Joe, while Big E and Woods won the SmackDown Tag Team Championship for a record-tying fourth time for New Day (which also technically made Kingston a double champion, as WWE counts all of New Day's Tag Team Championship reigns as individual reigns for all three members under the Freebird rule). At Smackville, he successfully defended the title against Dolph Ziggler and Samoa Joe in a triple threat match. Kingston defended his title against Randy Orton at SummerSlam, where the match ended in a double count out. The two had a rematch at Clash of Champions, where Kingston was victorious. On the September 17 episode of SmackDown Live, Brock Lesnar confronted Kingston and challenged him to a championship match on the October 4 episode of SmackDown, which Kingston accepted. At the 20th Anniversary of SmackDown on October 4, Kingston lost the title to Lesnar in 10 seconds, ending his reign at 180 days.

==== Return to the tag team division (2019–2023) ====
In October 2019, Kingston returned to competing in tag team matches. At Crown Jewel later that month, Kingston and Big E competed in a tag team turmoil match for the WWE Tag Team World Cup, but they failed to win the match. On the November 8 episode of SmackDown, Kingston and Big E defeated The Revival to win the SmackDown Tag Team Championship, becoming four-time champions as a team, and record fifth reign for The New Day as a stable. At TLC: Tables, Ladders & Chairs, Kingston and Big E successfully defended the titles against The Revival in a ladder match. On January 26, 2020, at the Royal Rumble, Kingston participated in the Royal Rumble match, but was eliminated by Brock Lesnar. At Super ShowDown, Kingston and Big E lost the championships against John Morrison and The Miz and failed to regain the titles at Elimination Chamber.

At WrestleMania 36, Kingston, who represented The New Day, failed to win the titles back from Morrison, who represented himself and Miz, in a triple threat ladder match, also involving Jimmy Uso, who represented The Usos. A rematch took place on the April 17 episode of SmackDown, where Big E, who represented The New Day, won the titles back from Miz, who represented himself and Morrison, in a triple threat match, also involving Jey Uso, who represented The Usos, and this makes The New Day six-time SmackDown Tag Team Champions. At The Horror Show at Extreme Rules on July 19, Kingston and Big E lost their titles to the team of Cesaro and Shinsuke Nakamura in a tables match after being powerbombed through two tables. while Kingston would suffer a legitimate back injury, thus being out for nearly three months.

On the October 9 episode of SmackDown, both Kingston and Woods returned from injury and defeated Cesaro and Nakamura, winning their seventh SmackDown Tag Team Championship. After the match, as part of the 2020 Draft, Kingston and Woods were drafted to the Raw brand, splitting them from Big E, who remained on the SmackDown brand. On the October 12 episode of Raw, New Day would exchange tag team titles with Raw Tag Team Championship holders The Street Profits, who were drafted to SmackDown. This would mark Kingston and Woods' third reign with the Raw titles as a team (fifth for Kingston individually), New Day's 10th tag team championship reign in WWE as a team, and Kingston's 13th tag team championship reign individually. On December 20, at TLC, Kingston and Woods lost the Raw Tag Team Championship to The Hurt Business (Cedric Alexander and Shelton Benjamin). In January 2021, Kingston stated that he was sidelined with a jaw injury. Kingston returned to the ring on the February 8 episode of Raw, teaming with Woods to defeat Retribution (T-Bar and Mace). At Elimination Chamber, Kingston competed in the WWE Championship Elimination Chamber match, eliminating Randy Orton, before being eliminated by Sheamus. On the March 15 episode of Raw, Kingston and Woods would defeat Cedric Alexander and Shelton Benjamin to win back the Raw Tag Team Championship, the New Day's 11th tag team championship, and Kingston's 14th individually. They would hold the championship until WrestleMania 37 where they lost the titles to AJ Styles and Omos.

On the May 17 episode of Raw, Kingston defeated Randy Orton, and then WWE Champion Bobby Lashley on the same night. The following week on Raw, he faced Drew McIntyre in a singles match with a stipulation in which the winner will face Lashley for the WWE Championship at Hell in a Cell, and the match ended in a no contest. A rematch between him and McIntyre was scheduled on Raw next week with the same stakes, where Kingston would lose. On the June 21 episode of Raw, Kingston interrupted Lashley and challenged him for the title, Lashley accepted and the match was scheduled for Money in the Bank. At the event, he lost the match.

As a part of the 2021 Draft, Kingston and Woods were drafted to the SmackDown brand. In October, Kingston entered the King of the Ring tournament, where he lost to Jinder Mahal in the first round. Woods, however, went on to win the King of the Ring tournament. Woods, in turn, changed his ring name to "King Woods", and he knighted Kingston as "Sir Kofi Kingston", the Hand of the King. Kingston and Woods then reignited their feud with The Usos, but would be defeated to them at WWE Day 1 and then again in a Street Fight on following SmackDown. In following weeks, Big E would rejoin The New Day as they would start a new feud with Sheamus and Ridge Holland, but during a match Big E encountered a neck injury. Kingston and Woods eventually challenged Sheamus and Ridge Holland for a tag team match at WrestleMania 38 in a losing effort. They would then start a feud with returning Viking Raiders, who would brutally attack them. They would be unsuccessful in defeating Viking Raiders several times. They would then once again start a brief feud with The Usos as they wanted to defend their record of longest-reigning tag team champions, however, they were unsuccessful. They would make a surprise appearance on NXT in December challenging for NXT tag team championship. New Day would win the match and the titles, giving them the Tag Team Triple Crown (Raw, SmackDown, and NXT Tag Team Championships), and making Kingston the first wrestler to have won both WWE's traditional Triple Crown and Tag Team Triple Crown. In the process, Kingston is the only person to have won the original World, Raw, SmackDown, and NXT Tag Team Championships. At NXT Vengeance Day, Kingston and Woods lost the titles to Gallus (Mark Coffey and Wolfgang) in a Fatal four-way tag team match ending their reign in 56 days. As part of the 2023 WWE Draft, Kingston, along with teammate Woods, was drafted to the Raw brand.

==== Final storylines and departure (2024–2026) ====
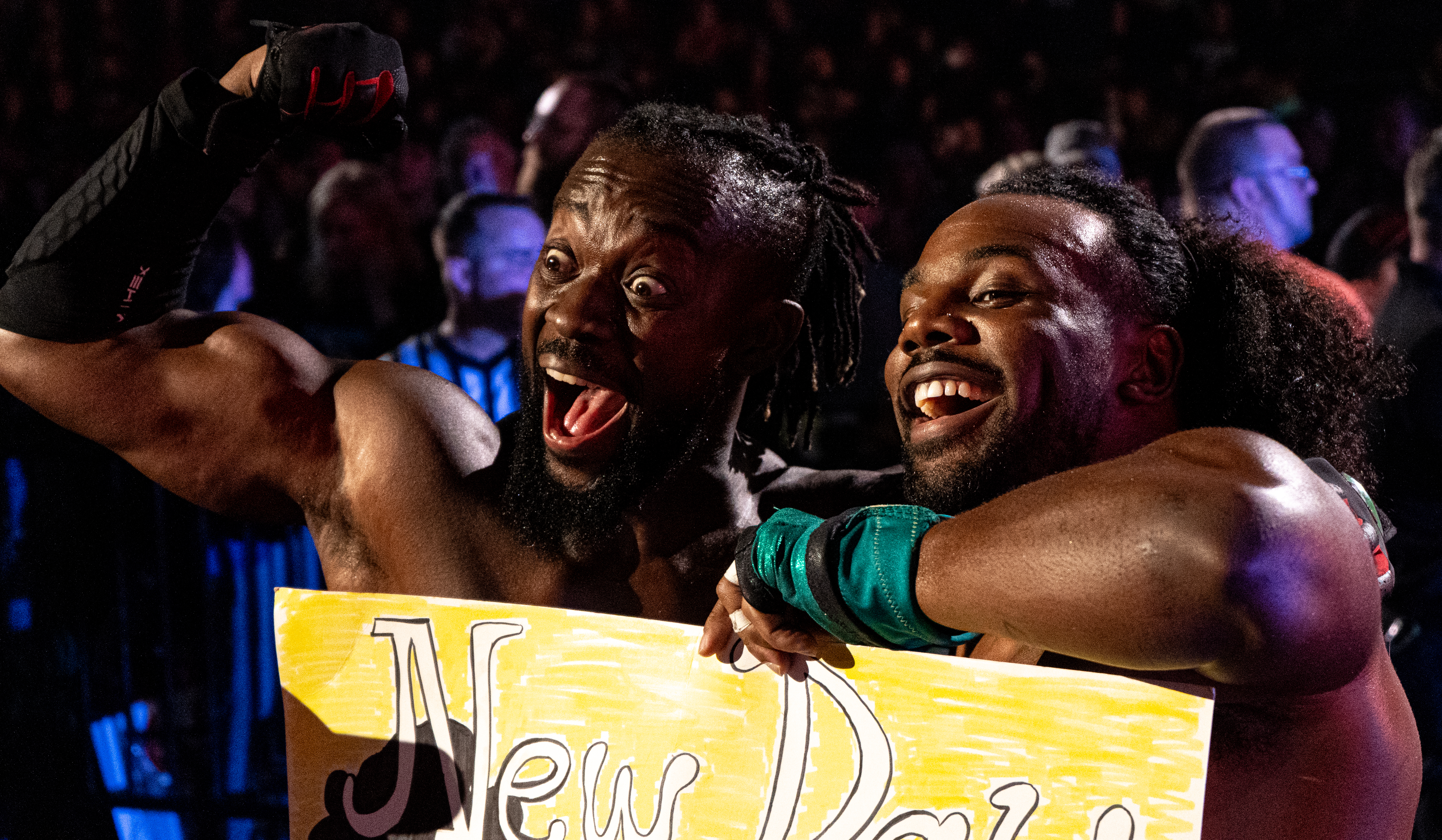
Kingston and Woods in 2024

As part of the 2024 WWE Draft, The New Day remained on Raw. Woods and Kingston began feuding with Karrion Kross and his stable The Final Testament. Kross attempted to form a wedge between the two tag team competitors, claiming that Kingston was holding Woods back from having a successful singles career, leading to several on-screen and backstage bouts between the two factions. The feud concluded on the August 19 episode of Raw when The New Day and Odyssey Jones defeated The Final Testament in a Six-Man Tag Team Match. On the September 16 episode of Raw, Kingston and Woods failed to defeat The Judgment Day (Finn Bálor and JD McDonagh) for the World Tag Team Championship after the referee was distracted with the remainder of The Judgment Day ("Dirty" Dominik Mysterio and Carlito with Women's World Champion Liv Morgan) brawling with Latino World Order (LWO; Dragon Lee, Cruz Del Toro and Joaquin Wilde) at ringside. After the match, Woods was livid that Kingston had approached LWO without being consulted, driving a bigger wedge between the two. On the November 25 episode of Raw, after losing to Alpha Academy (Otis and Akira Tozawa) and many weeks of disagreements, the pair had an extremely heated argument, attacking each other's achievements in WWE. On the December 2, 2024 episode of Raw during the 10-year anniversary cerebration of the formation of The New Day, Big E made an in-ring reunion with Kingston and Woods for the first time since his injury. Due to the dissension between the two throughout the year, Big E announced that he will return to manage them. However, Kingston and Woods lashed out at Big E for abandoning them after his injury in March 2022 and kicked him out the stable, turning heel for the first time since 2016, and reconciling with one another in the process.

At WrestleMania 41 Night 1 on April 19, 2025, Kingston and Woods defeated the War Raiders to win the World Tag Team Championship, marking Kingston's 16th tag team championship. On the June 30 episode of Raw, Kingston and Woods lost their titles to The Judgment Day (Finn Bálor and JD McDonagh), ending their reign at 72 days. Kingston's last match was on April 17, 2026 episode of SmackDown where he and Grayson Waller lost a WWE Tag Team Championship match against Damian Priest and R-Truth. On May 2, 2026, it was reported that Kingston and Woods mutually agreed to part ways with WWE, ending Kingston's almost 20-year career and tenure with the company. It was later confirmed by both Kingston and Woods that they refused to take a pay-cut of more than 50% in their new contract offer and opted to be released from their deals.

=== All Elite Wrestling (2026–present) ===
On August 30, 2026, at All In, Sarkodie-Mensah, now as a babyface and using the mononymous name Kofi, made his All Elite Wrestling (AEW) debut alongside Austin Creed (formerly Xavier Woods in WWE) as The New Level, where they teamed with Swerve Strickland to win the AEW World Trios Championship in a Trios Roulette match. The trio then began a feud with former champions "Hangman" Adam Page and Brodido (Brody King and Bandido). They successfully defended their titles against Page and Brodido at All Out on September 26. During this feud, Kofi unsuccessfully challenged Bandido for the ROH World Championship on October 6 at Grand Slam France before the trio lost their titles back to Page and Brodido in a two-out-of-three falls match 1–2 at WrestleDream on October 17, ending their reign at 48 days. The trio regained the titles on November 14 at Full Gear in a Texas Death match to begin their record-tying second reign as a team.

== Other media ==
In 2012, he guest-starred in an episode of Disney XD's karate sitcom Kickin' It. In 2016, he appeared with his New Day teammates on a Christmas Family themed Let's Make a Deal. In 2017, he published The Book of Booty: Shake It. Love It. Never Be It with fellow New Day members Big E and Xavier Woods.

Kingston and Woods appeared on an episode of Smosh Pit's Try Not to Laugh YouTube series.

== Filmography ==
=== Film ===
Year	Title	Role	Notes
2016	Countdown	Himself	Uncredited
2016	Scooby-Doo! and WWE: Curse of the Speed Demon	Himself	Voice
2020	The Main Event	Himself	Cameo
2021	Escape the Undertaker	Himself	Main star

=== Television ===
Year	Title	Role	Notes
2012	Kickin It	Himself	

=== Video games ===
Year	Title	Notes
2008	WWE SmackDown vs. Raw 2009	Video game debut
2009	WWE SmackDown vs. Raw 2010	
2010	WWE SmackDown vs. Raw 2011	
2011	WWE All Stars	Cover athlete
2011	WWE '12	
2012	WWE '13	
2013	WWE 2K14	
2014	WWE 2K15	
2014	WWE SuperCard	
2015	WWE 2K16	
2016	WWE 2K17	
2017	WWE 2K18	
2017	WWE Champions	
2017	WWE Mayhem	
2017	WWE Tap Mania	
2018	WWE 2K19	
2019	WWE 2K20	
2020	The King of Fighters All Star	
2020	WWE 2K Battlegrounds	
2020	Gears 5	
2022	WWE 2K22	
2023	WWE 2K23	
2024	WWE 2K24	
2025	WWE 2K25	
2026	WWE 2K26	

== Personal life ==
Sarkodie-Mensah married Kori Campfield on September 11, 2010. They have three children together: two sons named Khi and Orion Kingsley, and a daughter named Lotus Selene.

Sarkodie-Mensah's favorite wrestler growing up was Shawn Michaels. In a June 2019 interview, he stated that Dolph Ziggler was "one of my favorite opponents of all time, if not my favorite. Not to toot my own horn or our horn, our matches have always been off the chain. We have really good chemistry."

Sarkodie-Mensah is close friends with former tag team partner CM Punk, stating that Punk took him under his wing when he didn't have to and he was "always grateful for that friendship". He is also close friends with Xavier Woods and Big E, with whom he formed The New Day.

Sarkodie-Mensah has tattoos of Ghanaian Adinkra symbols along his spine. His first name (Kofi) is the traditional name in Ghana for people born on a Friday. Sarkodie-Mensah is a supporter of the New England Patriots, on December 1, 2024 during the Patriots game vs. the Indianapolis Colts he was honored as the teams keeper of the light ringing Gillette Stadium’s fog bell at the lighthouse prior to the kick off the game.

In an April 2020 interview with Muscle & Fitness, Sarkodie-Mensah announced that he had become a vegan.

== Championships and accomplishments ==
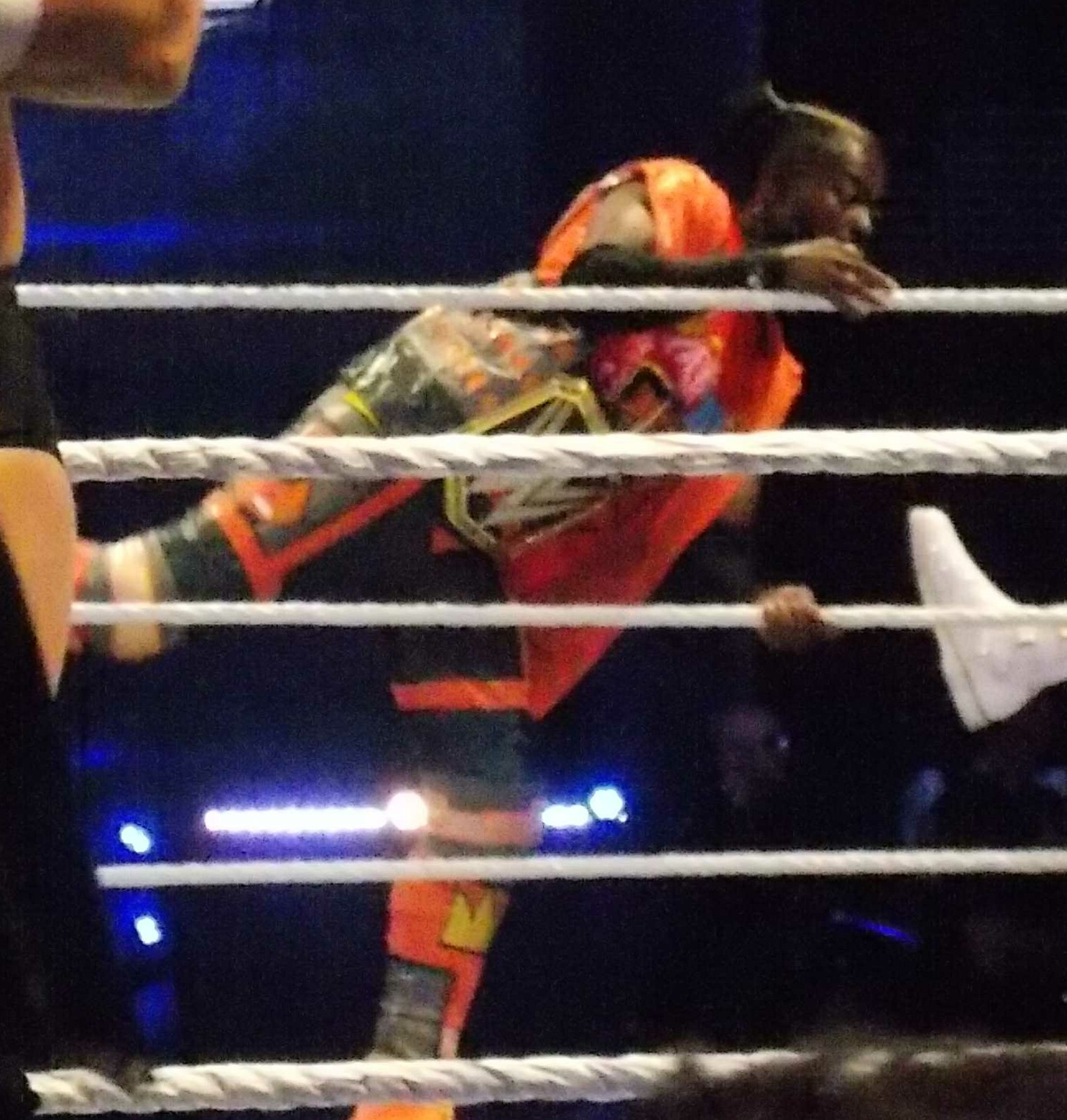
Kingston is a one-time WWE Champion...

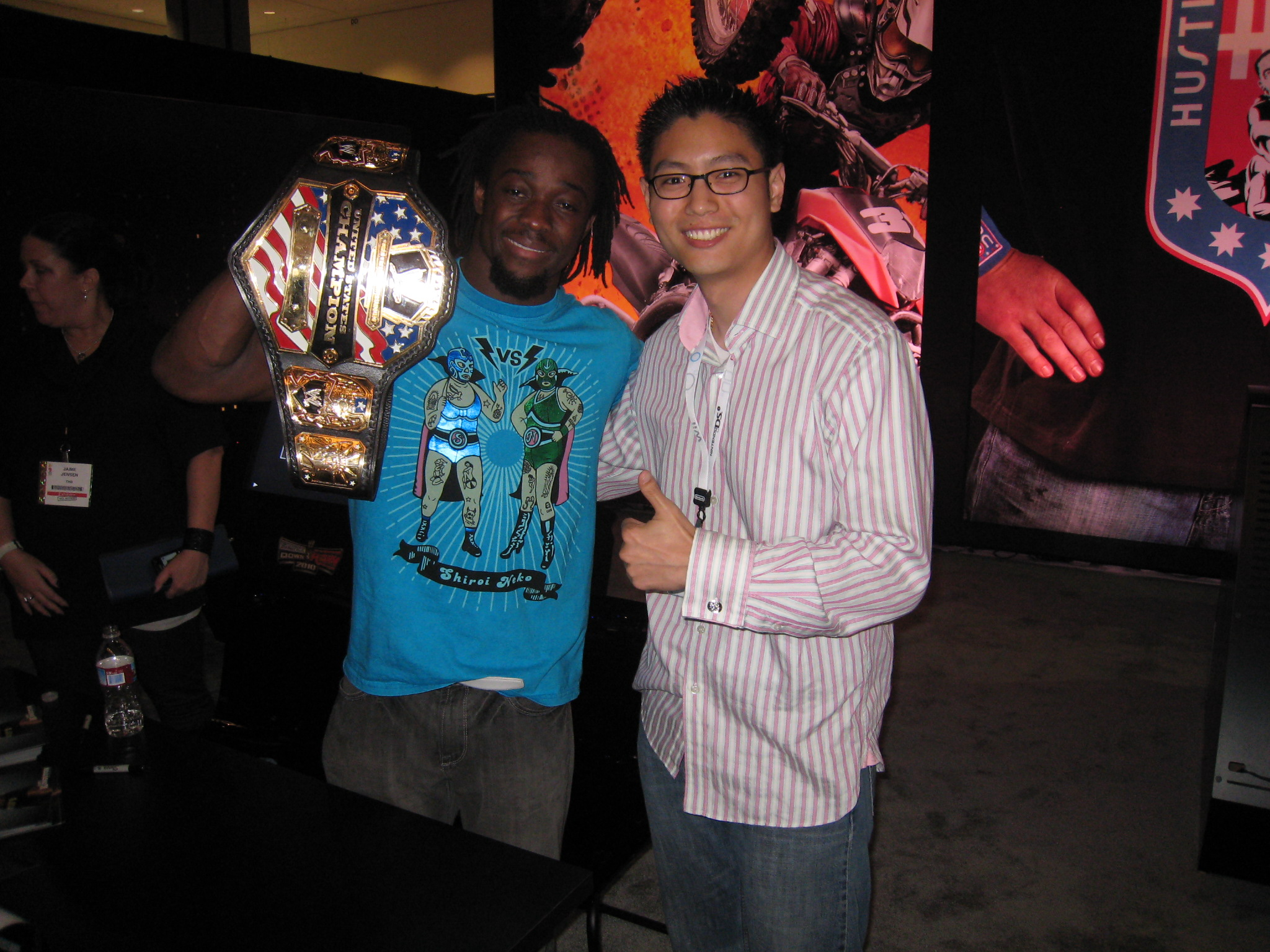
...a three-time United States Champion...

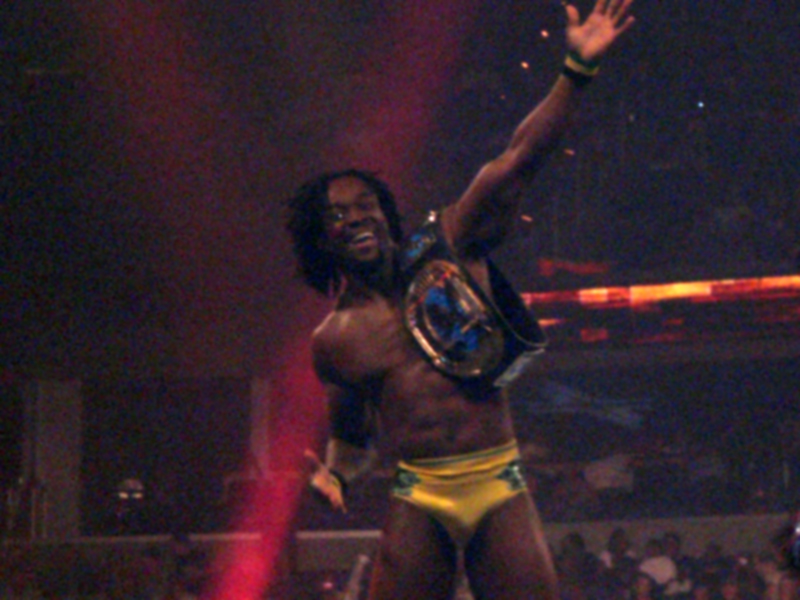
...a four-time Intercontinental Champion...

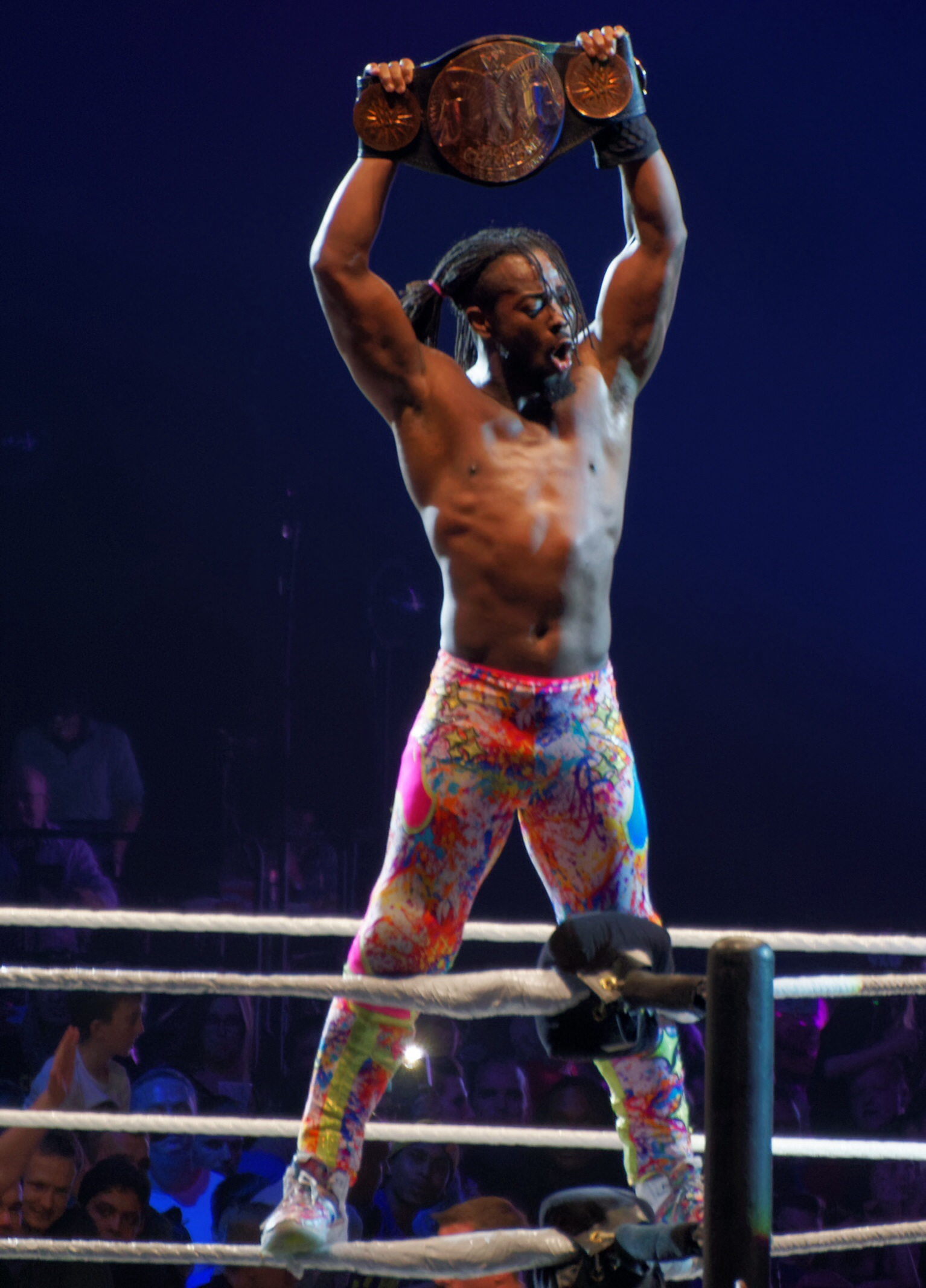
... and a 16-time tag team champion (a record for WWE-branded tag team championships), holding the NXT Tag Team Championship and now-retired World Tag Team Championship once each, the WWE/Raw/World Tag Team Championship a record seven times (his 4th reign being the longest reign for that title), and the SmackDown Tag Team Championship a record seven times.

- All Elite Wrestling
  - AEW World Trios Championship (2 times, current) – with Austin Creed and Swerve Strickland
- CBS Sports
  - Best Moment/Angle of the Year (2019) – Winning the WWE Championship at WrestleMania 35
- Pro Wrestling Illustrated
  - Tag Team of the Year (2012) with R-Truth
  - Tag Team of the Year (2015, 2016) with Big E and Xavier Woods
  - Ranked No. 4 of the best 500 singles wrestlers in the PWI 500 in 2019
  - Ranked No. 8 of the top 50 tag teams in the PWI Tag Team 50 in 2020 with Big E and Xavier Woods
- Sports Illustrated
  - Ranked No. 9 of the top 10 male wrestlers in 2019
- Wrestling Observer Newsletter
  - Best Gimmick (2015) – The New Day, shared with Big E and Xavier Woods
- World Wrestling Entertainment / WWE
  - WWE Championship (1 time)
  - WWE Intercontinental Championship (4 times)
  - WWE United States Championship (3 times)
  - World Tag Team Championship (7 times) (Note: The title was named the WWE Tag Team Championship during his first, second, and third reigns. It was renamed the WWE Raw Tag Team Championship during his fourth reign and maintained this name during his fifth and sixth reigns. It was named the World Tag Team Championship by the time of his seventh reign.) (Note: Big E, Kingston, and Woods defended the title under the Freebird Rule.) – with Evan Bourne (1), R-Truth (1), Big E and Xavier Woods (2) and Xavier Woods (3)
  - WWE SmackDown Tag Team Championship (7 times) – with Big E and Xavier Woods (6) and Xavier Woods (1)
  - World Tag Team Championship (1971–2010) (1 time) – with CM Punk
  - NXT Tag Team Championship (1 time) – with Xavier Woods
  - 13th Grand Slam Champion (under current format; 20th overall)
  - 30th Triple Crown Champion (traditional format)
  - Third Tag Team Triple Crown Champion – with Xavier Woods
  - Bragging Rights Trophy (2010) – with Team SmackDown (Big Show, Rey Mysterio, Jack Swagger, Alberto Del Rio, Edge and Tyler Reks)
  - WWE Intercontinental Championship Tournament (2010)
  - WWE SmackDown Tag Team Championship Tournament (2018) – with Big E and Xavier Woods
  - Slammy Award (2 times)
    - "Tell Me I Did Not Just See That" Moment of the Year (2012) – Hand walking during the Royal Rumble match to avoid elimination
    - Ring Gear of the Year (2020) – with Big E and Xavier Woods
  - WWE Year-End Award (2 times)
    - Men's Tag Team of the Year (2019) – with Big E and Xavier Woods
    - Moment of the Year (2019) – Winning the WWE Championship at WrestleMania
