= Visa policy of Ghana =

Policy on permits required to enter Ghana

Visitors to Ghana must obtain a visa from one of the Ghanaian diplomatic missions unless they come from one of the countries or territories that are either visa exempt or whose citizens may obtain a visa on arrival.

== Visa policy map ==
Visa policy of Ghana Ghana Visa not required Electronic Travel Authorization (90 days) eVisa

== Visa exemption ==
Citizens of the following countries can visit Ghana without a visa:

- All ECOWAS member states
- Burkina Faso
- Mali
- Niger

== ETA (Electronic travel authorization) ==
Citizens of the following countries and territories are required to obtain an Electronic Travel Authorization to enter Ghana, for a stay up to the duration listed below. The Electronic Travel Authorization is granted free of charge:

90 days

- All other African Union member states
- Antigua and Barbuda
- Bahamas
- Barbados
- Dominica
- Grenada
- Guyana
- Jamaica
- Saint Lucia
- Saint Kitts and Nevis
- Saint Vincent and the Grenadines
- Singapore
- Trinidad and Tobago

A visa is not required for holders of a Dual Nationality Card issued by Ghana. Pre-arranged visa may be picked up on arrival.

Holders of diplomatic, official, or service passports issued to nationals of Brazil, China, Cuba, Equatorial Guinea, Germany, India, Iran, Malta, Namibia, South Africa, United Arab Emirates, Venezuela and holders of diplomatic passports issued to nationals of Turkey do not require a visa for Ghana.

=== Future changes ===
Ghana has signed visa exemption agreements with the following countries, but they are not yet in force:

Country	Passports	Duration of stay	Visa exemption agreement signed on
Saint Kitts and Nevis	Diplomatic and service	TBA	November 2018
Angola	Diplomatic and service	90 days	August 2019
Serbia	Diplomatic and official	TBA	8 July 2022
Maldives	All	30 days	14 March 2023
Algeria	Diplomatic and service	TBA	May 2025

== Electronic visa (e-Visa) ==
Ghana has brought online the official portal that will be used for electronic visa applications starting May 25, 2026.

The processing time for the e-Visa is 96 hours, costing $260 for a single entry and $468 for a multiple entry visa, making it one of the most expensive e-Visas. Fees are higher for faster processing.

== Discrepancies ==
The following countries were previously visa-free; however, they do not appear as visa-free or ETA eligible in the visa wizard. They appear eligible for an ETA on IATA Timatic.

- Maldives

== Visa on arrival ==
According to the UAE Ministry of Foreign Affairs, the Passport Index, and the Henley Passport Index, citizens of the United Arab Emirates can obtain a visa on arrival. All other official sources say that an eVisa is required.

If special requirements are satisfied, citizens of countries without any diplomatic or consular mission of Ghana who are travelling on short notice may also obtain a visa on arrival.

Visa is granted on arrival for holders of a copy of a pre-arranged approval from immigration.

== See also ==
- Visa requirements for Ghanaian citizens
