= Ghanaian passport =

Travel document

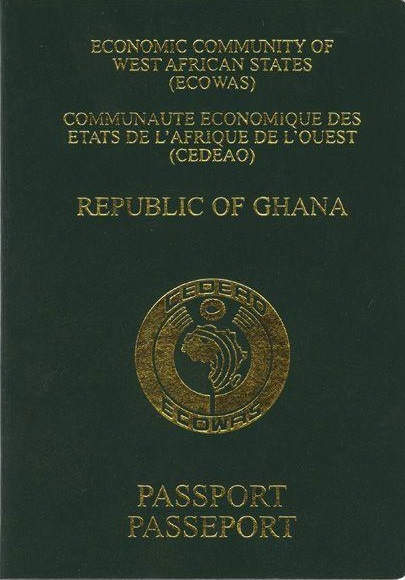
- Front cover of a contemporary Ghanaian passport

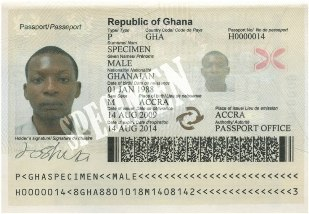
- Identification page
- Type: Passport
- Issued by: Ghana
- Purpose: Identity document
- Eligibility: Ghanaian citizenship
- Expiration: 10 years
- Cost: GH₵640 (US$110)

Ghanaian passports are issued exclusively by the Ministry of Foreign Affairs and Regional Integration to Ghanaians granted citizenship in accordance with the Ghanaian nationality law. There are three types of passport booklets – contemporary (regular), service, and diplomatic passports. Ghanaian passport booklets are valid for travel by Ghanaians anywhere in the world, although the holder may need to obtain a visa from the destination country when travelling for some purposes. More than one valid Ghanaian passport of the same type may not be held.

== Types ==
There are three types of Ghanaian passports:

- Contemporary – Issuable to all citizens and non-citizen nationals and valid for ten years from the date of issue.
- Service – Issuable to officials attached to government institutions who travel on official business.
- Diplomatic – Issuable to Ghanaian diplomats accredited overseas and their eligible dependents.

== Format ==
=== Physical ===
- Paper size B7 (ISO/IEC 7810 ID-3, 88 mm × 125 mm (3.5 in × 4.9 in))
- 32 pages (passports with more pages can be issued to frequent travelers)

=== Cover ===
Contemporary passports are hunter green in color, service passports are cadet grey, and diplomatic passports are auburn. At the top is printed "ECONOMIC COMMUNITY OF WEST AFRICAN STATES (ECOWAS)" followed by "COMMUNAUTE ECONOMIQUE DES ETATS DE L'AFRIQUE DE L'OUEST (CEDEAO)". The words "REPUBLIC OF GHANA" follow. The CEDEAO/ECOWAS emblem appears next. At the bottom are the words "PASSPORT" and "PASSEPORT", "SERVICE PASSPORT" and "PASSEPORT DE SERVICE", or "DIPLOMATIC PASSPORT" and "PASSEPORT DIPLOMATIQUE", depending on the type of passport (contemporary, service, or diplomatic, respectively).

=== Identification page ===
The following information about the owner is printed on the identification page in both English and French:

- Type
- Code of issuing state
- Passport number
- Surname
- Given name(s)
- Nationality
- Date of birth
- Residence
- Sex
- Place of birth
- Place of issue
- Date of issue
- Date of expiry

=== Photographs ===
Message page from a Ghanaian passport

The standards for the photograph are:

- 2 in × 2 in (5.1 cm × 5.1 cm)
- Front view, full face, open eyes, closed mouth, and natural expression
- Full head from top of hair to shoulders
- Plain background
- No shadows on face or in background
- No sunglasses; no hat
- Normal contrast and lighting but must not be blurred

=== Message ===
Passports of many countries contain a message, nominally from the official who is in charge of passport issuance (e.g., secretary of state, minister of foreign affairs), addressed to authorities of other countries. The message identifies the bearer as a citizen of the issuing country, requests that they be allowed to enter and pass through the other country, and requests further that, when necessary, they be given help consistent with international norms. In Ghanaian passports, the message is in English and reads:

These are to request and require in the name of the President of the Republic of Ghana all those whom it may concern to allow the bearer to pass freely without let or hindrance and to afford him or her every assistance and protection of which he or she may stand in need.

== Fees ==
As of February 2018, the fee for a new passport with regular (15-day) delivery time was GH₵450.00 (US$45.20 in February 2018) Three-day express service is available for GH₵450.00 additional.

As of February 2020, the application fee for regular 32 page passport booklet is GH₵320 and GH₵550 for regular 48 page passport booklet. The application fee for expedited 32 page passport booklet is GH₵350 and GH₵300 for expedited 48 page passport booklet. RECENT

Ghanaian passports

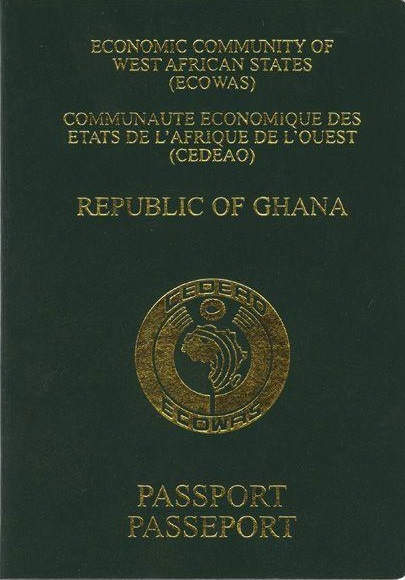
Contemporary passport (hunter green)

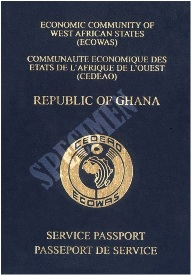
Service passport (cadet grey)

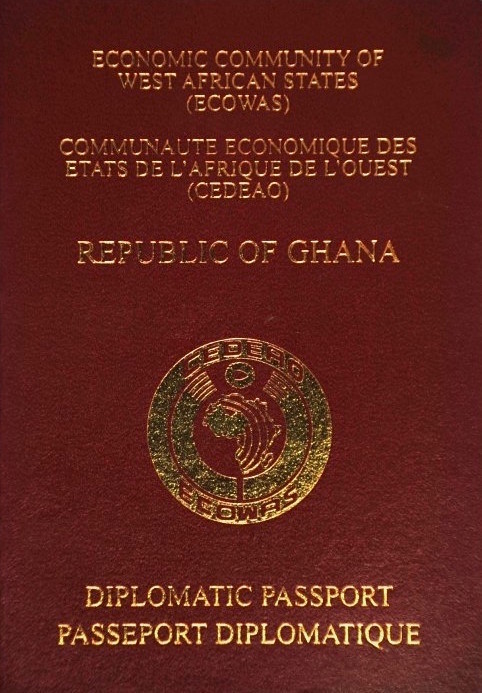
Diplomatic passport (auburn)

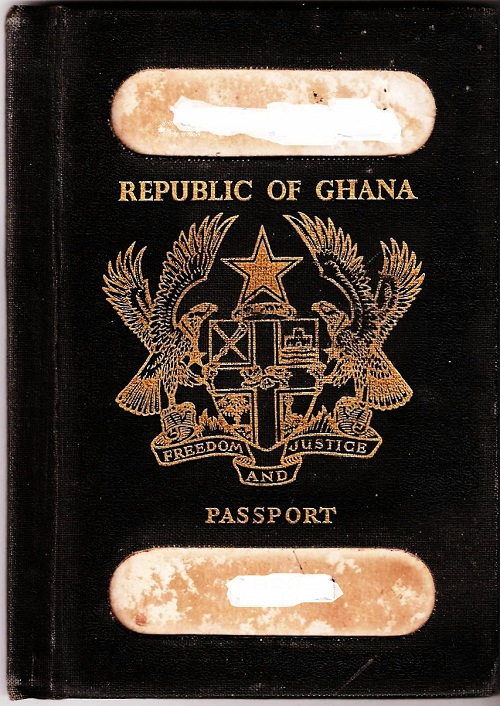
Ghanaian passport c. 1970

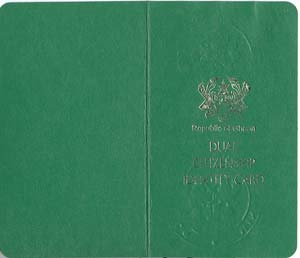
Multiple citizenship Ghanaian identity document (jade)

== Recent developments ==
To conform to the recommended standards (i.e., size, composition, layout, technology) set by the International Civil Aviation Organization (ICAO), Ghana has issued biometric passports as standard since March 2010, though existing non-biometric passports were valid until November 2015.

To facilitate the application for and acquisition of Ghanaian passports, Passport Application Centers (PACs) have been set up around the major cities of Ghana, including Accra, Kumasi, Tamale, Ho, Sekondi-Takoradi, and in Sunyani. 22 Diplomatic Missions outside Ghana have the mandate as at November 2020, to issue Biometric Passports to Ghanaians who are abroad.

In December 2018, the Government of Ghana introduced a new Premium Passport Application Centre, located at the Accra Digital Centre, to process online passport applications faster. The Premium Passport Application Centre enables applicants to go through the passport application process within 30 minutes but at an additional charge of GH₵80.00 (US$40.30 in December 2018).

Passports issued for applications received starting 31 March 2019 have a validity period of ten years (it was previously five years).

Online passport application is now available at all passport application centres nationwide (Online passport applicants were previously processed at the Accra passport application centre only). Also the manual passport application process will cease to operate starting 1 March 2020.

The Ministry of Foreign Affairs and Regional Integration has introduced a 48-page passport booklet (It was previously 32 pages only) available from 1 February 2020. The ministry has also made an upward review of fees effective 1 February 2020 as follows: Ordinary passport application which was GH₵50 is now GH₵100 for 32 pages passport booklet and GH₵250 for 48 pages passport booklet. Expedited passport application which was GH₵150 is now GH₵350 for 32 pages passport booklet and GH₵400 for 48 pages passport booklet. Also fees for attestation of legal document which was GH₵155 is now GH₵137 and travel certificate fees which was GH₵95 is now GH₵137.

== See also ==
- Ghana Card
- Ghanaian nationality law
- Visa requirements for Ghanaian citizens
