= Ghanaian nationality law =

Ghanaian Citizenship Act

Parliament of Ghana
- Long title: An Act to provide for acquisition and determination of Ghanaian nationality and citizenship.
- Citation: AND REGULATIONS/ACT 591.pdf Act No. 591 of 2000
- Enacted by: Government of Ghana
- Assented to: 30 December 2000

Amended by
- The Citizenship (Amendment) Act, 1971, the Citizenship (Amendment) Act, 1972, the Citizenship (Amendment) Act, 1978, the Citizenship (Amendment) Act, 1979, the Citizenship (Amendment) Act, 2000, and the Citizenship (Amendment) Act, 2002

Summary
- Along with the Constitution of Ghana, the Citizenship Act, 2000 is the exhaustive law relating to citizenship in Ghana.
- Status: Current legislation

The nationality law of Ghana is regulated by the Constitution of Ghana, as amended; the Ghana Citizenship Act, and its revisions; and various international agreements to which the country is a signatory. These laws determine who is, or is eligible to be, a national of Ghana. The legal means to acquire nationality, formal legal membership in a nation, differ from the domestic relationship of rights and obligations between a national and the nation, known as citizenship. Nationality describes the relationship of an individual to the state under international law, whereas citizenship is the domestic relationship of an individual within the nation. Ghanaian nationality is typically obtained under the principle of jus sanguinis, born to parents with Ghanaian nationality. It can be granted to persons with an affiliation to the country, or to a permanent resident who has lived in the country for a given period of time through naturalization.

== Acquisition of nationality ==
Nationality can be acquired in Ghana at birth or later in life through naturalization.

=== By birth ===
Those who acquire nationality at birth include:

- Children born anywhere who have at least one grandparent who is a Ghanaian national of origin; or
- Abandoned children or orphans, who are under the age of seven, and were discovered in the territory.

=== By naturalisation ===
Naturalisation can be granted to persons who have resided in the territory for a sufficient period of time to confirm they understand the customs and traditions of the society and speak a language indigenous to Ghana. General provisions are that applicants have good character and conduct, as supported by witness statements of two attorneys or public officials; and are able to contribute to the development and progress of the nation. Applicants must typically have resided in the country for six years. Besides foreigners meeting the criteria, other persons who may be naturalised include:

- Adoptees upon completion of a legal adoption automatically derive Ghanaian nationality;
- The spouse of a Ghanaian national upon registration;
- Minor children can be automatically naturalised when their parent acquires nationality, or
- Refugees with the approval of the Minister of the Interior, if they meet the general naturalisation requirements.

== Loss of nationality ==
Ghanaian nationals can renounce their nationality pending approval by the state. Naturalised persons may be denaturalised in Ghana for disloyalty to the state; committing crimes against the state or state security; or for fraud, misrepresentation, or concealment in a naturalization petition. Persons who previously had nationality and wish to repatriate if they lost their status because of dual nationality are permitted to naturalise.

== Dual nationality ==
Dual nationality has been allowed in Ghana since 2000. To accommodate the needs of the African diaspora, under the Immigration Act of 2000, persons of African descent may apply for an indefinite right of abode and the right of return to Ghana from the Minister of the Interior. Persons who serve in public office or high administration in the diplomatic, judiciary, legislature, or security services are typically barred from holding other nationalities, and the president must be a Ghanaian by birth.

== History ==
=== African empires and European contact (1471–1821) ===
Centralized states came into formation in the region which would become Ghana in the fifteenth century. Among them were the Buna, Dagbon, Gonja, Hausaland, and Wala Kingdoms. In 1481, the Portuguese, who had been settling in Morocco since 1415, decided to build a fortress and trading station, São Jorge da Mina (now Elmina Castle) on the coast of what is now Ghana, where they had a presence since 1471. Portugal's exclusive rights to the west coast of Africa were confirmed by the papal bull Romanus Pontifex issued by Pope Nicholas V, which was reconfirmed in the Inter caetera issued in 1493 by Pope Alexander VI. They built trading posts at São Antonio on the Ankobra River near present-day Axim in 1515 and São Sebastian on the Pra River near Shama by 1526. Disregarding the Portuguese trade monopoly, other Europeans began encroaching on their trade rights in the sixteenth century. The British arrived in 1553, the Dutch came in 1595, Danes and Swedes landed in 1640, and Brandenburgers reached the area in 1683. In 1637, the Dutch took Elmina Castle and in 1642 expelled the Portuguese from the Gold Coast. The Danish stronghold, which was constructed in 1661, was located at Fort Christiansborg, near Accra. Four years later, the British seized the Swedish trading fort of Cape Coast Castle, which had been built in 1653. The Brandenburgers established Groß Friedrichsburg before the end of the century. In the late seventeenth century, the Ashanti Empire began conquering local kingdoms, expanding to engage in trade and specifically in gold. Their main coastal rival was the Fante Confederacy.

Under the constitution of the Ashanti Empire, a feudal system was used to organize inhabitants of the various kingdoms. Male members of various villages swore an oath of allegiance to the Asante Hene (High King), who in exchange for their loyalty and obedience, conferred privileges in the society. The Asante Hene controlled all of the land within the empire and distributed it according to the social hierarchy in recognition for services rendered. According to custom, he held the Golden Stool and his highest ranking subordinate chiefs held silver stools. A group of elders, known as the Mpanyimfo, acted as advisors to each chieftain in the administration of his territory. Each territory had a designated elder who was in charge of military organisation and all adult male members of each district were required to serve in the unit. In the event of a national campaign, each of these territorial units came together to defend the empire. Subjects were tied to the district leaders by kinship, which assured their vassalage. The chieftain controlled inhabitants in his territory, but had only nominal authority over foreigners or those with affiliations to other chiefs, as well as their wives and children.

The Fante Confederacy expanded in the coastal areas from the seventeenth century, gaining control over rival kingdoms. Headed by the brafo, which Europeans equated to a king or steward, who had supreme authority over the chiefs of their territory. Initially, the title had referred to the commander-in-chief of the military, but as the society developed, command of the army later passed to other individuals and the brafo served as a head of state. His authority was typically hereditary, but his authority was limited in that he was unable to take actions without the approval of his Council of Chiefs or Elders, whom the British called his Curranteers, who were the headmen and spokespersons for various territories. In addition, priests and local governing officials, known as Caboceers administrated their districts and were involved in the development of national policies. Local leaders had considerable autonomy in managing the affairs of their districts. The central authorities were primarily engaged in overseeing negotiations with Europeans for trade concessions and the operations of commerce. To maintain authority and allegiance of the inhabitants of the states in the confederacy, the leadership distributed wealth to both attract and reward loyal subjects.

Growth of trade and conflicts with other African states led to frequent changes in alliances for the Fante Confederacy with European trading partners. In 1816, the Ashante Empire subjugated the Fante Confederacy establishing control over the coast. Though the Ashante Empire struggled with internal and external strife, by 1820 it had become the most dominant political alliance in the territory. Concerned that by their alliance with the Dutch the Ashante would hamper British trade, representatives of the British Company of Merchants and the government attempted negotiations. Unable to secure an acceptable compromise, the government decided to establish a protectorate to preserve British trade in the area.

=== British period (1821–1957) ===
In 1821, the British government took over the administration of the Gold Coast Colony from the Company of Merchants. Britain secured the Danish settlements in the region in 1850 and in 1872 ceded the Dutch territories. The British extended protectorate status over the Northern Territories of the Gold Coast in 1892 and the area officially became a British Protectorate in 1898. In 1896, Ashanti was made a British Protectorate and in 1901 was declared a colony. As a result of Germany's losses in World War I, the League of Nations awarded a mandate to Britain over British Togoland in 1922. At the end of World War II when Togoland became a United Nations Trust Territory, the Colonies, Protectorate, and Trust Territories of the Gold Coast became a single administrative unit of the crown. Internal governance was defined under the Gold Coast Constitution from 1925 to 1956, under four constitutions, 1925, 1946, 1950, and 1954. In 1956, the local legislature passed a motion of independence which was given royal assent on 7 February 1957.

In Britain, allegiance, in which subjects pledged to support a monarch, was the precursor to the modern concept of nationality. The crown recognised from 1350 that all persons born within the territories of the British Empire were subjects. Those born outside the realm — except children of those serving in an official post abroad, children of the monarch, and children born on a British sailing vessel — were considered by common law to be foreigners. Marriage did not affect the status of a subject of the realm. The first nationality laws passed by the British Parliament were extended only to the Kingdom of Great Britain, and later the United Kingdom of Great Britain and Ireland. When British protectorates were established in 1815, there was little difference between the rights of British subjects and protected persons. Under British law, mandated territories were outside the Crown's dominions, meaning British nationality laws did not apply to natives, but only to British subjects born to British fathers who may have been domiciled in a mandated place. (Note: A commission was convened in 1946 to review nationality of the inhabitants in former German colonies. It concluded that inhabitants of mandates did not acquire British nationality and if they had been German nationals under the terms of the 1913 Nationality law, they became stateless when Germany abandoned its territories. According to D. P. O'Connell, they were deemed to be "lacking nationality but enjoying an administrative status analogous to that of inhabitants of British protectorates".)

==== Persons of the Gold Coast and Ashanti Colonies and British subjects living throughout the Gold Coast (1914–1957) ====
In 1911, at the Imperial Conference a decision was made to draft a common nationality code for use across the empire. The British Nationality and Status of Aliens Act 1914 allowed local jurisdictions in the self-governing Dominions to continue regulating nationality in their territories, but also established an imperial nationality scheme throughout the realm. The uniform law, which went into effect on 1 January 1915, required a married woman to derive her nationality from her spouse, meaning if he was British, she was also, and if he was foreign, so was she. It stipulated that upon loss of nationality of a husband, a wife could declare that she wished to remain British and provided that if a marriage had terminated, through death or divorce, a British-born national who had lost her status through marriage could reacquire British nationality through naturalisation without meeting a residency requirement. The statute reiterated common law provisions for natural-born persons born within the realm on or after the effective date. By using the word person, the statute nullified legitimacy requirements for jus soli nationals. For those born abroad on or after the effective date, legitimacy was still required, and could only be derived by a child from a British father (one generation), who was natural-born or naturalised. Naturalisations required five years residence or service to the crown.

Amendments to the British Nationality Act were enacted in 1918, 1922, 1933 and 1943 changing derivative nationality by descent and modifying slightly provisions for women to lose their nationality upon marriage. Because of a rise in statelessness, a woman who did not automatically acquire her husband's nationality upon marriage or upon his naturalisation in another country, did not lose their British status after 1933. The 1943 revision allowed a child born abroad at any time to be a British national by descent if the Secretary of State agreed to register the birth. Under the terms of the British Nationality Act 1948 British nationals in the Gold Coast and Ashanti Colonies were reclassified at that time as "Citizens of the UK and Colonies" (CUKC). The basic British nationality scheme did not change overmuch, and typically those who were previously defined as British remained the same. Changes included that wives and children no longer automatically acquired the status of the husband or father, children who acquired nationality by descent no longer were required to make a retention declaration, and registrations for children born abroad were extended.

==== Indigenous persons in the Northern Territories Protectorate and British Togoland mandate/trust territory (1914–1957) ====
British protectorates and mandates, in 1914, were considered to be foreign territories lacking an internal government. When Britain extended this status over a territory, it took responsibility for both internal and external administration, including defense and foreign relations. Indigenous persons who were born in a protectorate were known as British Protected Persons (BPP) and were not entitled to be British nationals. BPPs had no right of return to the United Kingdom and were unable to exercise rights of citizenship; however, they could be issued a passport and could access diplomatic services when traveling abroad. In 1914, the Alien Restriction Act clarified that while BPPs were not nationals, neither were they aliens. When the law was amended in 1919, that provision remained the same, meaning that BPPs could not naturalise. Until 1934, when the British Protected Persons Order was drafted, the status of BPP was not statutory, but rather granted at the prerogative of the monarch. Under the 1934 Order, Belonger status with regard to protected territories was defined to mean persons born before or after the Order in a protectorate who possessed no nationality and were not a British subject, or persons born abroad to a native of a protectorate who were stateless and not British subjects. The statute extended BPP status to children and wives of BPPs, if they were stateless, and specifically provided that if a woman married someone who was a national of another nation, she lost her BPP status.

In 1943, the British Nationality Act clarified that BPPs born abroad in territories that were within the crown's dominions were British subjects by virtue of jus soli, but those born within a protectorate were not subjects. Under the terms of the British Nationality Act 1948, BPPs of the Northern Territories of the Gold Coast Protectorate status did not change. However, the Act, while retaining the provisions that BPPs were not aliens and could not naturalise, allowed BPPs to register as BPP of a protected place or as a British subject under certain conditions. In 1949, the British Protectorates, Protected States and Protected Persons Order in Council repealed former orders about BPPs and detailed provisions for conferring protected status. It provided that protected persons were BPPs of a protectorate if they were born there; if they were born abroad to a father who was a native of a protectorate; or if at the time of their birth their father was a BPP. It also allowed women married to BPPs to register as a BPP and allowed certain nationals of foreign countries to register as BPPs.

=== Post-independence (1957–present) ===
Under the Independence Act of 1957, the Gold Coast and Ashanti Colonies, Northern Territories of the Gold Coast Protectorate and British Togoland were merged into the new independent nation of Ghana on 6 March 1957. It did not specify retention or loss of British nationality for CUKCs, but provided that BPPs who became nationals of Ghana on independence day, ceased to be protected persons. The 1957 Constitution of Ghana provided that nationality would be defined in law, and subsequently the Ghana Nationality and Citizenship Act was promulgated on 11 May 1957. Under its terms persons who had been BPPs or CUKCs and were born in Ghana and whose father or paternal grandfather was born in the territory were conferred nationality on the date of the Act. Persons who had previously been naturalised or registered in Ghana did not automatically become nationals. Provisions were made for children whose parents would have become nationals except for their death prior to independence and for wives of Ghanaians to automatically acquire nationality. Because independence occurred on 6 March and the Nationality Act was effective on 11 May, there were persons who were not granted nationality during that period. As the Independence Act did not address CUKC status, the British Nationality Act of 1958 provided that if Ghanaian nationality had been acquired at independence in 1957, the person would cease to be a British subject on 20 February 1958. The British Act allowed persons who had not become nationals of Ghana because they were naturalised or registered prior to independence or because they were not a child of a Ghanaian father or grandfather to retain their status as a BPP or CUKC.

A New Ghanaian Constitution was drafted in 1960 and a Nationality Act (No. 62) was passed in 1961, but neither changed the nationality provisions. In 1967, the Ghana Nationality Decree granted nationality retrospectively to 6 March 1957, including those who had been omitted by the previous date discrepancy. It also removed the provision that a father or grandfather had to have been born in one of the Ghanaian territories which existed prior to independence. The change conferred upon the substantial community of Lebanese persons, who had been living in one of the former Ghanaian colonies or protectorates but who had not had a father or paternal grandfather born there, Ghanaian nationality. According to the 1958 British Nationality Act, those persons had retained their status as British subjects and continued to do so even after they were granted Ghanaian nationality. The 1969 Constitution and 1971 Ghana Nationality Act attempted to remove the liberalisation granting nationality to those born in the former colonies or protectorates; however, in a court case (Shalabi v. Attorney-General) the High Court of Ghana ruled that under Article 5 of the 1969 Constitution, persons who were nationals on the date the constitution went into force continued to be citizens. They voided provisions in the 1971 Nationality Act which attempted to restrict nationality by a narrower definition than the constitution. In response, the 1971 Nationality Act was amended in 1972 to deprive persons of nationality based on birth in the territory who had not obtained a court order barring their denaturalisation. The effect of this provision was that a child born in Ghana to an unknown father and a mother of nationality in a state that did not allow her to pass on her nationality would become stateless.

Under the 1992 Constitution, Article 6 provided that Ghanaians were persons who were considered citizens at the time it went into force. It also specified that persons born anywhere to Ghanaians, or who had a grandparent who was Ghanaian were considered to be nationals of Ghana, as were children of unknown parentage under the age of seven living in Ghana and children under age sixteen who were adopted by Ghanaians. The new constitution provided an ability to derive nationality from Ghanaian women for their children and spouses. But, while a foreign women who married a Ghanaian man could immediately acquire nationality, a foreign man marrying a Ghanaian woman was required to establish a permanent residency in Ghana. Under the Ghana Citizenship Act 2000, a widow or widower who failed to apply for nationality prior to the death of their spouse was able to register and obtain Ghanaian status. The 2000 Act also allowed Ghanaians to obtain dual nationality, but restricted high public offices to those holding only Ghanaian nationality.

== See also ==
- Nationality law
- Citizenship
- Passport
- Ghanaian passport
