= Brian Myers =

American professional wrestler (born 1985)

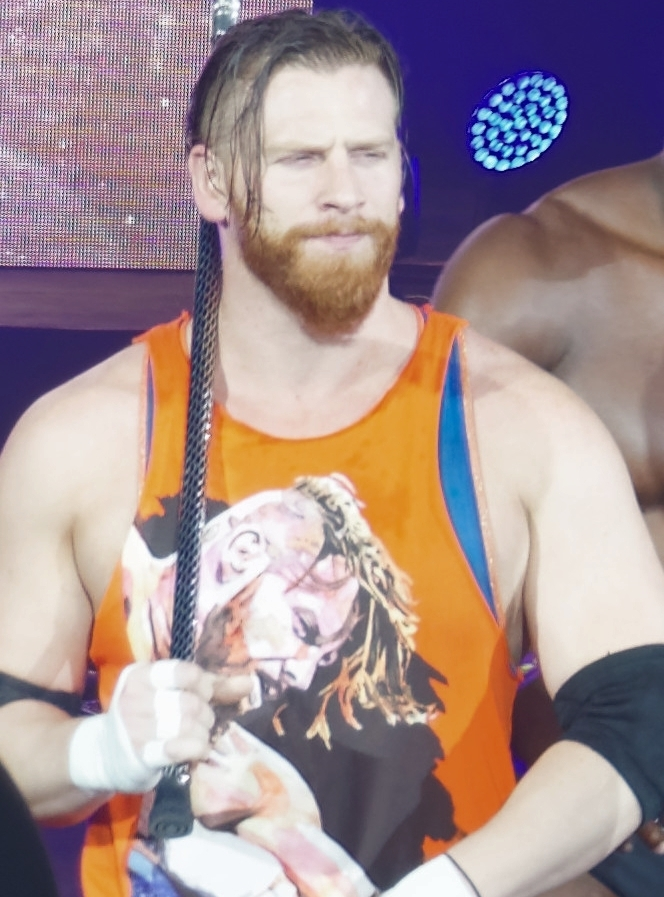
- Myers in 2017

Personal information
- Born: April 20, 1985 (age 41) Glen Cove, New York, U.S.
- Spouse: Elizabeth "Lizzie" Karcher (m. 2015)
- Children: 2

Professional wrestling career
- Ring name(s): Brian Major; Brian Majors; Brian Myers; Curt Hawkins
- Billed height: 6 ft 1 in (1.85 m)
- Billed weight: 223 lb (101 kg)
- Billed from: Queens, New York
- Trained by: Mikey Whipwreck
- Debut: 2004

Brian Myers (born April 20, 1985) is an American professional wrestler. He is signed to Total Nonstop Action Wrestling (TNA), where he is a member of The System. He is a four-time TNA World Tag Team Champion and is also a former one-time TNA Digital Media Champion. He is best known for his tenures in WWE from 2006 to 2014 and 2016 to 2020 under the ring name Curt Hawkins.

Myers signed with WWE in 2006 and was assigned to their developmental territories. In 2007, he was called up to the main roster and would eventually win the WWE Tag Team Championship with Zack Ryder as a part of La Familia. In 2014, he departed from WWE and returned to the independent circuit and worked there until 2016 when he re-signed with WWE. Shortly after his return, he amassed a WWE record 269-match losing streak which ended at WrestleMania 35 when he won the WWE Raw Tag Team Championship with Zack Ryder, almost ten years after they last held any titles as a team.

== Early life ==
Myers was born on April 20, 1985, in Glen Cove, New York. He graduated from Glen Cove High School in 2003. After he decided to pursue a professional wrestling career, Myers began training under Mikey Whipwreck.

== Professional wrestling career ==
=== New York Wrestling Connection (2004–2006) ===
After being trained by Mikey Whipwreck, Myers made his debut in 2004, using his real name. He wrestled for the New York Wrestling Connection (NYWC) promotion. He began regularly teaming with Brett Matthews and the duo of Myers and Matthews went on to defeat the NYWC Tag Team Champions Dickie Rodz and Mason Raige by disqualification, for which titles do not change hands. At the next event on June 4 they won a rematch decisively to become Tag Team Champions. Later that month they were attacked by The Dead Presidents (Lo Lincoln and Boog Washington) to set up a feud where they eventually lost their titles against them in July. On September 23, they were entered into a three-way match with the champions but Team Tremendous (Dan Barry and Ken Scampi) ended up with the belts. After continuing to win matches they re-earned a match against Team Tremendous and won the titles for the second time on January 25, 2006. They held the titles until they faced the B.S. Xpress (Tony Burma and Mike Spinelli), who defeated them for the gold on March 26.

=== World Wrestling Entertainment/WWE (2006–2014) ===
==== Developmental territories (2006–2007) ====
On February 24, 2006, Brian Myers signed a developmental contract with World Wrestling Entertainment. He was given the ring name Brian Majors and teamed up with his former tag team partner Bret Matthews, who was renamed Brett Majors, to form the tag team the Majors Brothers. Together they won the Deep South Wrestling DSW Tag Team Championship on two occasions. They later won the OVW Southern Tag Team Championship.

==== Major Brothers and La Familia (2007–2009) ====
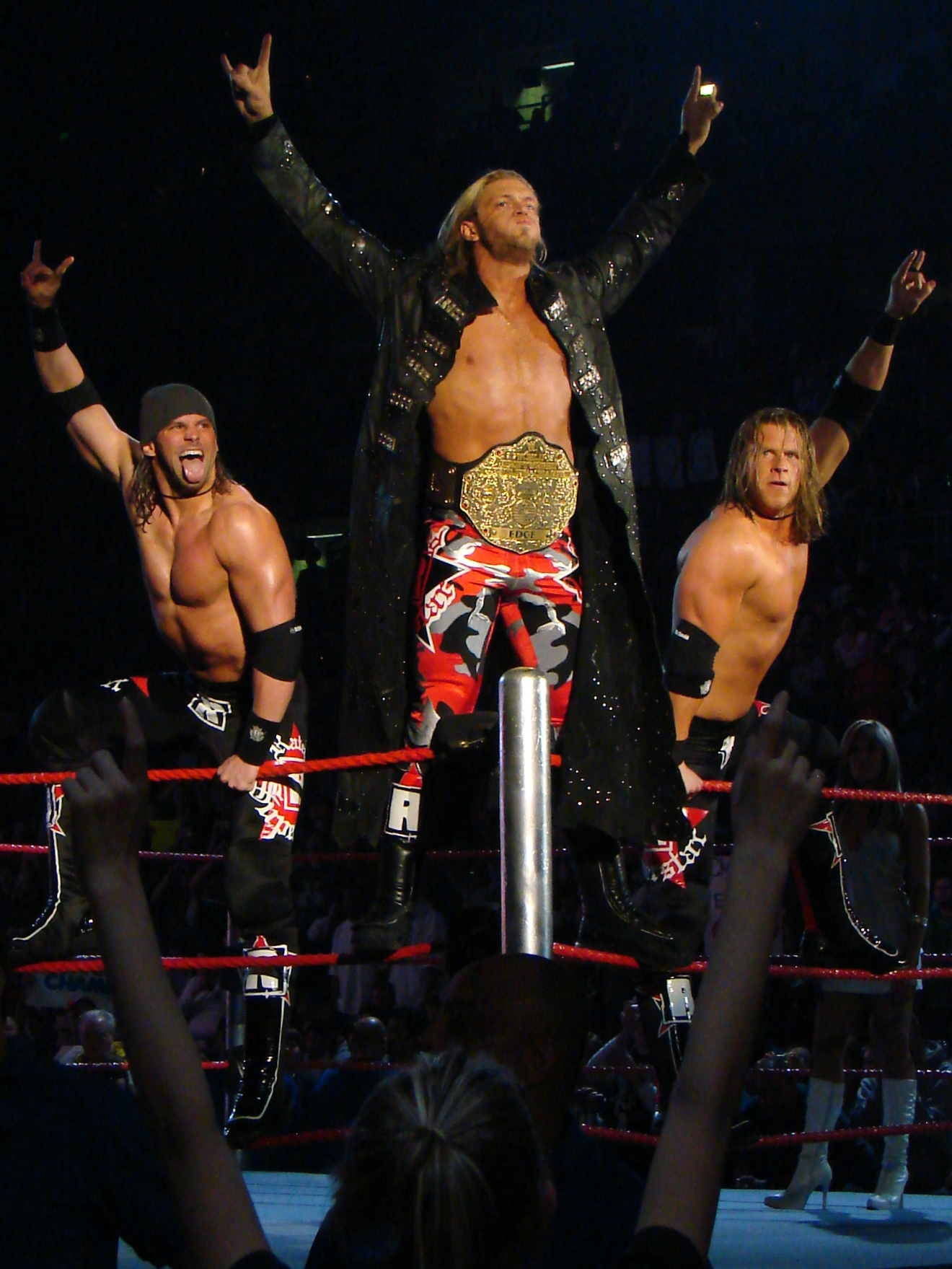
Hawkins (right) posing with Edge and Zack Ryder in March 2008

The team was moved from the developmental territories to the main roster, changing their last names from "Majors" to "Major". The team worked on WWE's ECW brand. The team won their debut match against Matt Striker and Marcus Cor Von of The New Breed on the May 1 episode of ECW, but failed to win any matches in either singles or tag team competition following their debut on the brand. They moved from ECW to SmackDown! as the eighth pick in the 2007 Supplemental Draft. They made their SmackDown! debut on July 6, defeating jobbers Jeremy Young and Mike Fox. On the November 9 episode of SmackDown!, they received a WWE Tag Team Championship match after winning a #1 contender's battle royal, but lost to WWE Tag Team Champions Montel Vontavious Porter and Matt Hardy in their title match.

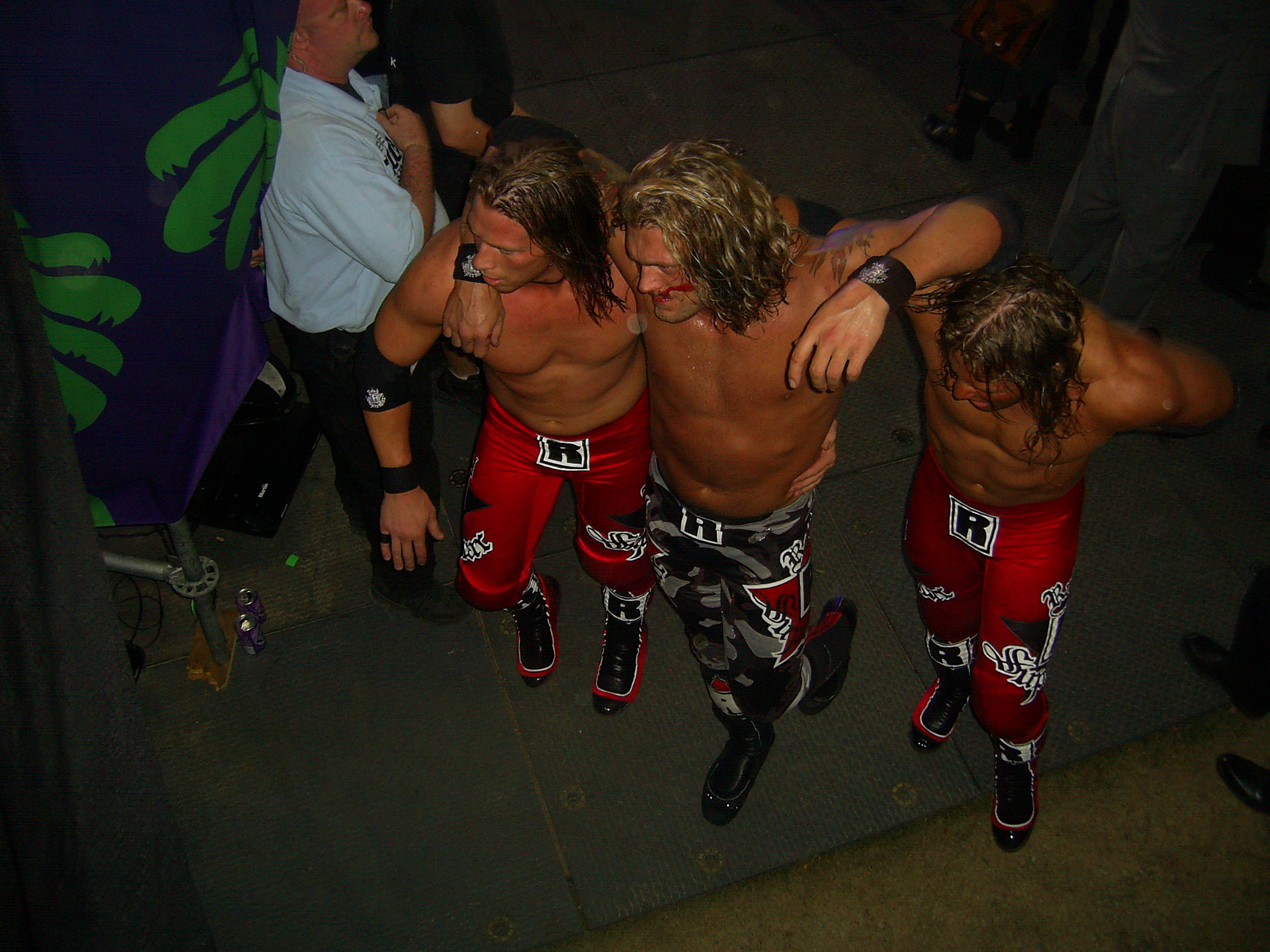
Hawkins and Ryder helping an injured Edge at WrestleMania XXIV

At Armageddon, the duo dressed up as Edge and interfered in the World Heavyweight Championship match also involving The Undertaker and Batista, replacing Edge during the match to help him win the title, turning heel for the first time in their WWE career. On the December 21 taping of SmackDown!, the Major Brothers were revealed as acquaintances to Edge and his lover, SmackDown General Manager Vickie Guerrero. The Major Brothers were repackaged and renamed as Curt Hawkins and Zack Ryder, with Brian Major becoming Curt Hawkins and Brett Major now named Zack Ryder. Their team name also became The Edgeheads, due to their resemblance to him.

On the January 4, 2008 episode of SmackDown!, Hawkins and Ryder competed against Batista in a 2-on-1 handicap match to a draw in a Beat The Clock Challenge when the time ran out. After assisting Edge in most of his matches for multiple months, Hawkins and Ryder captured the WWE Tag Team Championship from John Morrison and the Miz in a fatal-four-way tag team match, which also featured Jesse and Festus and Finlay and Hornswoggle at The Great American Bash in July, becoming the youngest tag team champions in WWE history up to that point. By SummerSlam in August, La Familia had begun to fracture and Hawkins and Ryder began appearing on their own.

On the September 26 airing of SmackDown, Hawkins and Ryder lost the titles to Carlito and Primo Colón in their first televised title defense. On April 15, 2009, Ryder was drafted back to the ECW brand as part of the 2009 Supplemental Draft, separating the team.

==== Florida Championship Wrestling (2009–2010) ====
Following the draft, Hawkins was on hiatus from television before voluntarily leaving the main roster and transferring to Florida Championship Wrestling (FCW) for more training. He made his debut losing to Dawson Alexander. In the following weeks, Hawkins won an 8-man battle royal to become the number one contender for Justin Angel's FCW Florida Heavyweight Championship, then lost the championship match. He joined a stable called "The Dude Busters" alongside Caylen Croft and Trent Barreta on November 1, 2009. In late November, Hawkins and Croft won the FCW Florida Tag Team Championship. While they were champions, Croft and Hawkins defended the title with Barreta via the Freebird Rule. On January 14, 2010, at an FCW television taping, The Dude Busters lost the FCW Florida Tag Team Championship to The Fortunate Sons (Brett DiBiase and Joe Hennig).

==== The Gatecrashers (2010–2011) ====
Hawkins returned to the SmackDown roster on May 4, 2010, forming a tag team with Vance Archer, defeating Chasyn Rance and JT Talent in a dark match. They made their television debut as a team on the May 13 episode of WWE Superstars, defeating two local competitors. After the match, Hawkins stated that he and Archer had been given a 30-day contract to "make an impact". The team made its SmackDown debut on the May 21 episode, winning another squash match. In an attempt to make an impact, the duo attacked Montel Vontavious Porter and Christian on consecutive episodes of SmackDown on June 4 and 11, which they followed up on by defeating both in a tag team match on June 18.

The next week the duo was officially named "The Gatecrashers". The pair also competed in a battle royal, on the June 4, 2010 episode of SmackDown, to replace The Undertaker in the World Heavyweight Championship fatal four-way match at Fatal 4-Way. Hawkins was one of the four final participants in the match, but was eliminated by the eventual winner, Rey Mysterio. After their 30-day contract expired, they were signed to new long-term contracts in storyline. The team came to an end on the October 7 airing of Superstars after a match between Archer and Chris Masters. Archer accidentally struck Hawkins outside the ring after which the two argued and a distracted Archer lost the match. Afterwards, Hawkins assaulted Archer. Hawkins moved to singles competition the following week, defeating Trent Barreta. A rivalry then began between the two shortly after, with Barreta getting the win on the November 18 episode of Superstars. In a rematch the next week, Hawkins defeated Barreta, claiming Barreta's win the week before was a fluke. The feud ended with Barreta coming out on top when Barreta beat Hawkins on the December 9 episode of Superstars.

==== Teaming with Tyler Reks (2011–2012) ====
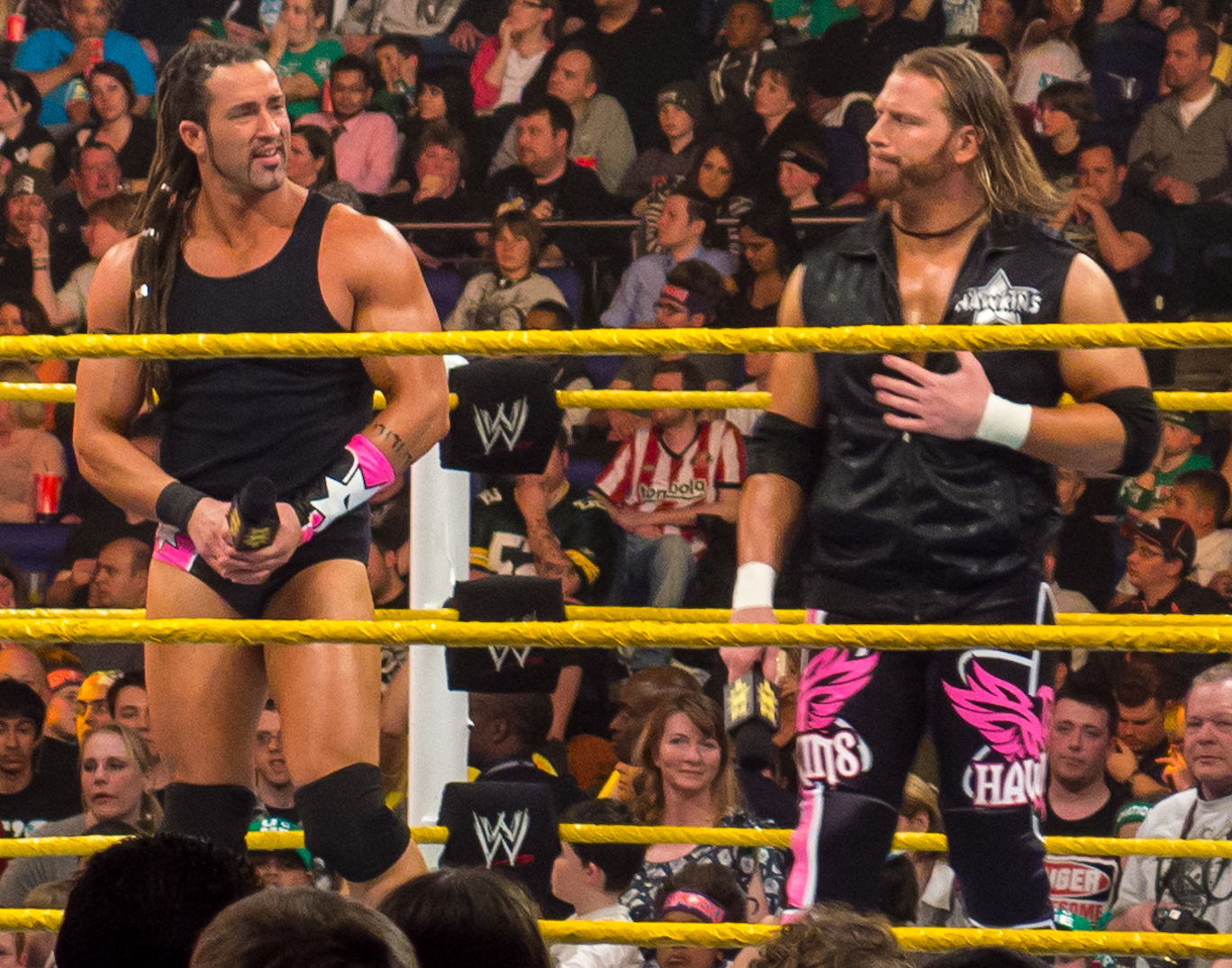
Tyler Reks and Hawkins (right) in 2012

On April 26, Hawkins was drafted to the Raw brand as part of the 2011 Supplemental Draft. Hawkins and Ryder had a brief reunion on the May 19 episode of Superstars, where they teamed together in a losing effort against Kozlov and Santino Marella. After Hawkins beat JTG on the May 26 episode of Superstars, Hawkins returned on the September 8 episode of Superstars, teaming with Tyler Reks to defeat Percy Watson and Titus O'Neil. Hawkins and Reks then began appearing on the fifth season of NXT, by attacking The Usos from behind on the September 27 episode of NXT. Over the next two weeks on NXT, Hawkins and Reks faced the Usos in tag team matches, with Hawkins and Reks winning the first match and the Usos winning the second match.

From October 2011, Hawkins, claiming a broken ankle, began to carry around a metal walking cane. However, when Hawkins' injury had healed sufficiently for him to wrestle, he still brought the cane with him to the ring. Hawkins and Reks then lost a non-title match to Air Boom on the December 22 episode of Superstars. Hawkins debuted on Raw on January 9, 2012, and was quickly defeated by a returning Brodus Clay. Hawkins and Reks feuded with Trent Barreta and Yoshi Tatsu from December 2011. Both teams regularly played pranks on each other, Tatsu being locked in a closet and Reks' hands being superglued onto an Xbox 360 controller. The feud ended when Hawkins and Reks defeated Barreta and Tatsu on the January 18 episode of NXT.

Hawkins and Reks then became NXT's troublemakers, tormenting NXT host Matt Striker on his lacklustre career and how they should be main-eventing NXT, even once going to the extent of assaulting him after a match. This forced Striker to appoint William Regal as NXT's prime authority figure on the February 29 episode of NXT. Regal often employed harsh measures to keep Hawkins and Reks in line, including threatening suspensions for bad behaviour and condemning them to janitorial duty, this caused them much frustration. On the March 21, 2012 episode of NXT Redemption, a storyline began in which Striker was knocked out with chloroform by Johnny Curtis and Maxine, and then Striker was kidnapped by unknown persons, later revealed to be Hawkins and Reks, who intended to blackmail Maxine into using her charms to get Regal to leave them alone. Unfortunately for Hawkins and Reks, Striker was rescued by Derrick Bateman and Kaitlyn. On the April 18 episode of NXT, the freed Striker confronted Hawkins and Reks about the kidnapping, and Hawkins admitted the crime. As punishment, Regal put Hawkins and Reks in a match against each other, with Striker as referee. The loser would be fired. Even though Reks won to supposedly save her job at the expense of Hawkins', Regal decided to fire Reks as well, sending the two troublemakers away from NXT.

However, Regal could not keep the duo away from NXT for long, as they managed to convince villainous higher authority figure John Laurinaitis to rehire them as NXT's security team on the May 9 episode of NXT. Hawkins and Reks continued to act as Laurinaitis' lackeys, confiscating anti-Laurinaitis signs at Over the Limit and attacking John Cena on the May 21 episode of Raw. Hawkins and Reks' association with Laurinaitis ended after Laurinaitis lost his job at No Way Out. On the final episode of the fifth season of NXT on June 13, Hawkins and Reks defeated Percy Watson and Derrick Bateman.

Hawkins and Reks engaged in a one-sided feud with Ryback in July 2012. After both Hawkins and Reks lost singles matches to Ryback on SmackDown, Ryback defeated both of them in a handicap match at Money in the Bank. At Raw 1,000, Hawkins and Reks, along with Jinder Mahal, Drew McIntyre, Hunico and Camacho attempted to ambush Kane to make a statement, but a returning The Undertaker interrupted the attack and the Brothers of Destruction disposed of Hawkins and Reks. They again lost to Ryback on the August 6 episode of Raw. After being told by SmackDown General Manager Booker T to "step it up", Hawkins and Reks debuted a stripper gimmick on the August 17 episode of SmackDown while squashing a jobber tag team.

A week later, Reks asked for her release as she intended to retire from wrestling to spend more time with her family; she and WWE parted ways on August 21, thus ending the team. In October, Hawkins announced that he had undergone surgery for a torn posterior cruciate ligament and meniscus.

==== NXT and departure (2013–2014) ====
On the January 21, 2013 Raw, a short-haired Hawkins returned on television tapings in a show-closing brawl. He made his return match on the February 9 episode of Saturday Morning Slam, losing to Justin Gabriel. After that, Hawkins most commonly appeared on Superstars and NXT, where he lost all of his matches. On the May 8, 2014 episode of NXT, Hawkins competed in a battle royal to determine number one contender for the NXT Championship, in which he was unsuccessful. On the May 22 episode of NXT, Hawkins faced Adrian Neville in a losing effort. On June 12, WWE announced that Hawkins was released from his contract, ending his eight-year tenure with the company.

=== Independent circuit (2014–2016) ===
A day after his release from WWE, Myers wrestled at a Jersey Championship Wrestling (JCW) event, teaming with Val Venis to defeat Danny Demento and Erik Andretti.

On August 29, 2014, Myers made his debut for Pro Wrestling Guerrilla (PWG), losing to A.J. Styles in the first round of the 2014 Battle of Los Angeles.

In April 2015, Myers defeated Brent Banks, in Alpha-1 Wrestling, to win the A1 Alpha Male Championship in Hamilton, Ontario and the first singles championship in his pro wrestling career. He would later lose the title, in June, to Josh Alexander.

In June 2015, Myers defeated Chris Payne, in Pro Wrestling Syndicate (PWS), to win the PWS Television Championship.

In August 2015, Myers defeated Papadon, in Five Borough Wrestling (FBW), to win the FBW Heavyweight Championship.

In September 2015, Myers lost his PWS Television Championship to Chris Payne. In December, Myers regained the title after he defeated Payne in a ladder match.

In April 2016, Myers defended his FBW Heavyweight Championship in a Fatal 4-Way match and lost his title to Mike Verna.

=== Global Force Wrestling (2015) ===
On July 24, 2015, Myers made his Global Force Wrestling debut entering a tournament to crown the inaugural GFW Global Champion but lost in the quarterfinal round to Chris Mordetzky.

On August 28 and 29, 2015 during the GFW Grand Slam Tour in Harrisburg, Pennsylvania and Richmond, Virginia, Myers faced off against Chris Mordetzky in a losing effort on both nights.

On October 23, Myers faced Kevin Kross and Kongo Kong in a three-way number one contenders match for the GFW Global Championship, which was won by Kong.

=== Total Nonstop Action Wrestling (2015) ===
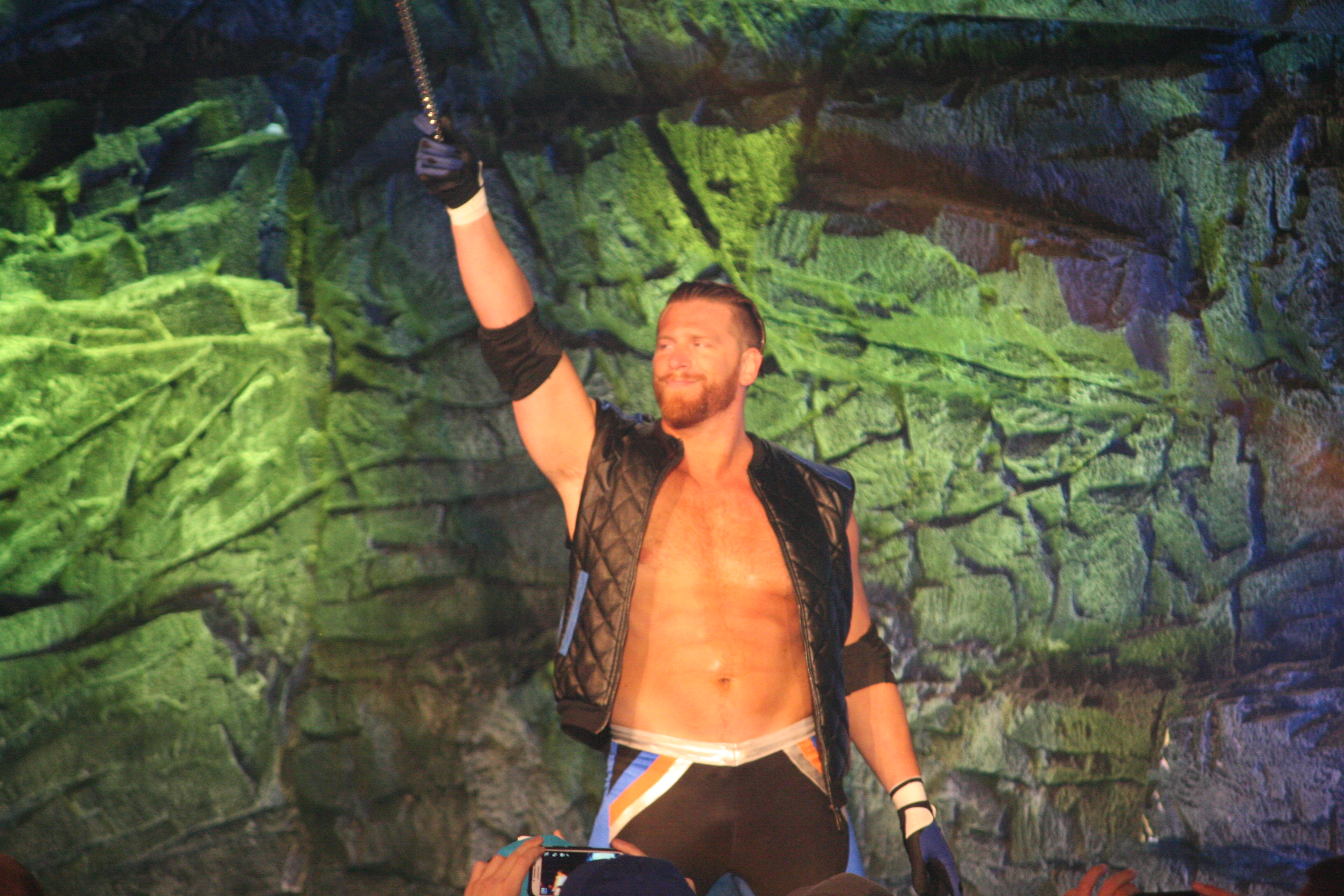
Myers in October 2015

Myers made his Total Nonstop Action Wrestling (TNA) debut representing GFW on the July 27, 2015 episode of Impact Wrestling, where he teamed with Trevor Lee and lost to The Wolves. On the September 2 edition of Impact Wrestling, Myers and Lee defeated The Wolves in a rematch to win the TNA World Tag Team Championship. The next week on the September 9 edition of Impact Wrestling, they dropped the title back to The Wolves, ending their reign for only one day. On the September 16 edition of Impact Wrestling, Team GFW (Myers, Jeff Jarrett, Eric Young, Chris Mordetzky and Sonjay Dutt) lost to Team TNA (Drew Galloway, Lashley, Eddie Edwards, Bram and Davey Richards) in a Lethal Lockdown match. At Bound for Glory, he and Trevor Lee had a rematch for the TNA World Tag Team Championship against the Wolves, but failed to win the titles.

=== Return to WWE (2016–2020) ===
==== Face the Facts (2016–2017) ====
On July 21, 2016, Myers signed to make his return to WWE and joined the SmackDown brand. Myers returned to WWE under his Curt Hawkins ring name in vignettes, stating that it was "time to face the facts" in similar vein of the well-known Chuck Norris facts, beginning in August. This continued until it was announced that he would make his televised in-ring return at the No Mercy pay-per-view. At the event, he "stepped into the ring" and announced his debut match to take place on that week's episode of SmackDown Live. However, the scheduled match was bumped from the show due to time constraints. The week after on SmackDown Live, Hawkins was scheduled to face Apollo Crews. After Crews punched Hawkins, Hawkins left the ring before the match could start.

Jason Powell of Pro Wrestling Dot Net described Hawkins' gimmick as an "obnoxious heel" that "bounces from being funny to groan-inducing", while praising Hawkins' performance. Hawkins' actions were also widely compared to that of Eva Marie, in which Marie would fake unfortunate events to avoid in-ring competition. On the November 1 episode of SmackDown Live, Hawkins accepted Dolph Ziggler's first open challenge for the Intercontinental Championship, losing to Ziggler in seven seconds.

On the November 8 episode of SmackDown, Hawkins earned his first televised victory since returning by defeating Apollo Crews, which would be his last televised victory until 2019. On the TLC: Tables Ladders and Chairs pre-show, Hawkins made his pay-per-view in-ring return, where he teamed with The Ascension and the Vaudevillains against Apollo Crews, American Alpha, and the Hype Bros in a losing effort. On the March 14, 2017 episode of SmackDown Live, in a backstage segment, Hawkins declared he would be competing in the André the Giant Memorial Battle Royal at WrestleMania 33, where the match was won by Mojo Rawley.

==== Losing streak storyline (2017–2019) ====
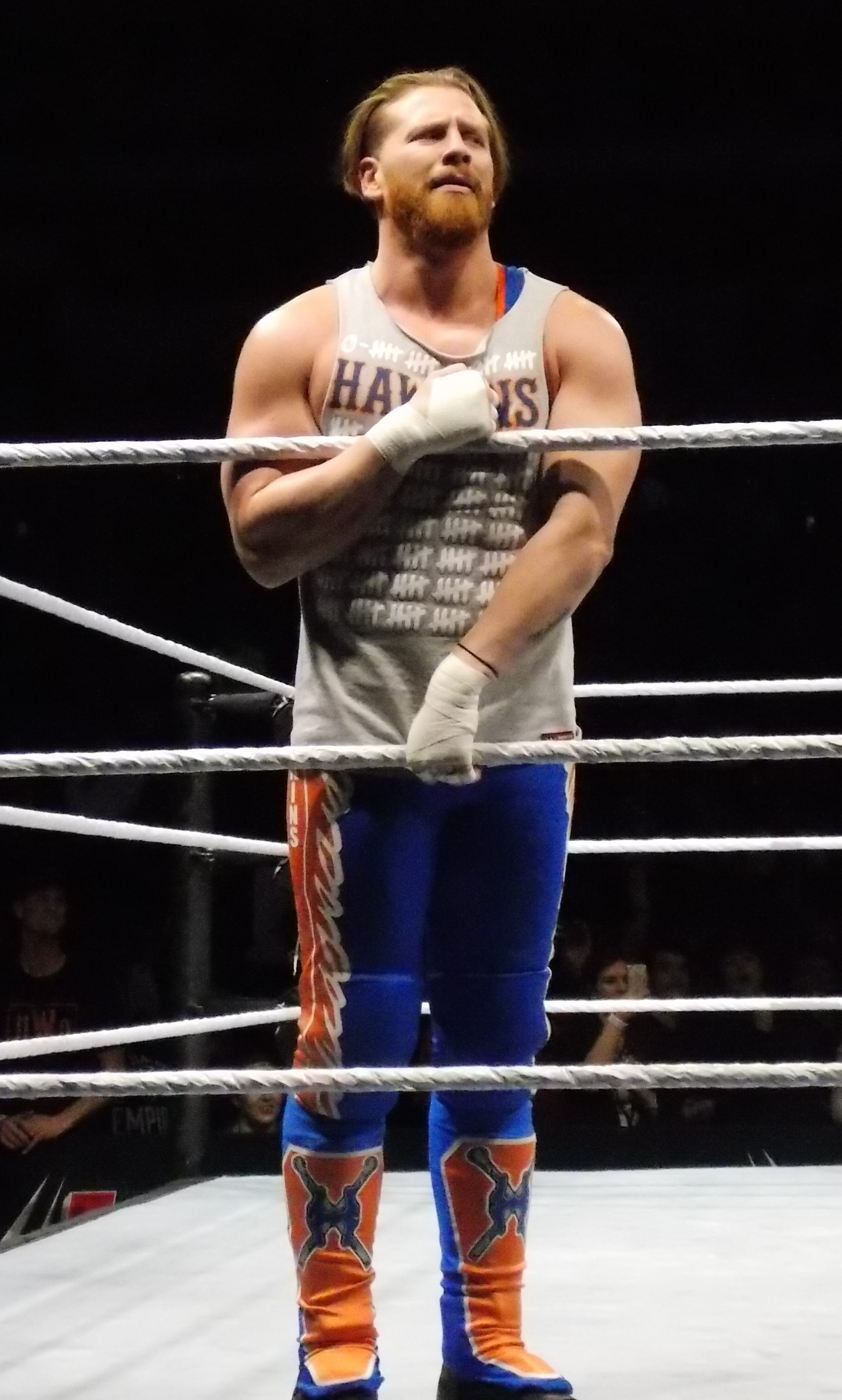
Hawkins in February 2018

On April 10, Hawkins was moved to the Raw brand as part of the Superstar Shake-up. During this time, he suffered many losses to Apollo Crews, Finn Bálor, Seth Rollins and Jason Jordan. In July 2017, it was revealed that Hawkins had a losing streak of 100 matches, claimed by WWE to be the longest losing streak of the 'modern era'. This was soon included into Hawkins' gimmick. At Great Balls of Fire on July 9, Hawkins competed in his only main card pay-per-view match of 2017, in a quick loss to Heath Slater. By the end of 2017, Hawkins failed to win a match, ending the year with over 150 consecutive losses. In early 2018, Hawkins regularly wrestled on Main Event and continued his losing streak, with Hawkins achieving numerous near falls and being described as a "sympathetic figure at this point."

At WrestleMania 34, Hawkins competed in the André the Giant Memorial Battle Royal which was won by Matt Hardy. At the Greatest Royal Rumble, Hawkins entered at number 43, but was quickly eliminated by Braun Strowman. On the June 4 episode of Raw, Hawkins earned his 200th consecutive loss to a local wrestler after Baron Corbin interrupted Hawkins' match and attacked his opponent, causing Hawkins to lose via disqualification. In November, Hawkins competed in the second season of WWE Mixed Match Challenge, teaming with Ember Moon after Moon's previous partner Braun Strowman was unable to compete due to an elbow injury. On November 27, Hawkins and Moon were eliminated from the competition, losing to Jinder Mahal and Alicia Fox in the quarterfinals.

==== Reunion with Zack Ryder and departure (2019–2020) ====
On the January 21, 2019 episode of Raw, Hawkins attempted to persuade Vince McMahon into booking him in a match, but was instead inserted as the special guest referee for The Revival's (Dash Wilder and Scott Dawson) Raw Tag Team Championship match against Bobby Roode and Chad Gable, in which The Revival lost after Hawkins witnessed them attempting to cheat three times, allowing Roode and Gable to win. After the match, Hawkins turned face after he was attacked by The Revival, until Zack Ryder came to Hawkins' aid, foreshadowing a reunion. Hawkins competed in the Royal Rumble match entering at number 9, eliminating Titus O'Neil before being eliminated by Samoa Joe. The following night on Raw, Hawkins and Ryder teamed up, where they were defeated by The Revival.

On April 5, WWE announced that Hawkins and Ryder would face The Revival at WrestleMania 35 for the Raw Tag Team Championship. The match would take place on the WrestleMania Kickoff Show, and after having amassed a losing streak of 269 matches, Hawkins pinned Scott Dawson to win the Raw Tag Team Championship and ended his losing streak. The next night on Raw, Hawkins and Ryder made their first successful title defense, defeating The Revival in a rematch. They would later beat The Revival in another rematch that took place on the April 29 episode of Raw. Following that, the team was largely absent from television, making only two appearances on WWE programming during the month of May, a loss to the Viking Raiders on the May 6 episode of Raw and a win against Luke Gallows and Karl Anderson on the May 27 episode of Main Event. On the June 10 episode of Raw, Ryder and Hawkins dropped the titles back to The Revival in a tag-team triple threat match, which also involved The Usos. On November 14 at a live event in Mannheim, Germany, Hawkins and Ryder defeated Gallows and Anderson and the Street Profits (Angelo Dawkins and Montez Ford) in a triple threat tag-team match to become the #1 contenders for the Raw Tag Team Championships for the November 18 episode of Raw. At the Elimination Chamber, Ryder and Hawkins lost to the Viking Raiders in the pre-show. The following night on Raw, Hawkins' partner Ryder lost to Bobby Lashley which would be their final appearances in WWE.

On April 15, 2020, Hawkins (alongside Ryder) was released from his WWE contract as part of budget cuts stemming from the COVID-19 pandemic, ending his second tenure of four years with the company.

=== Return to Impact Wrestling / TNA (2020–present) ===
==== Early feuds and The Learning Tree (2020–2022) ====
On July 21, 2020 episode of Impact!, Myers made his return to Impact Wrestling in a pre-taped promo where he was shown sporting a mask. Myers had previously worked for Impact Wrestling in 2015 when it was known as Total Nonstop Action Wrestling (TNA). On the August 11 episode of Impact, Myers made his in-ring return to Impact Wrestling answering Eddie Edwards' open challenge for the Impact World Championship where he was defeated. On the August 18 episode of Impact Emergence Night One, Myers established himself as a heel when he interrupted an interview session between Willie Mack and Jimmy Jacobs, and threatened Jacobs to interview him, only to be attacked by Mack later on. The following week on Emergence Night Two, he defeated Mack and once again on the September 8 episode of Impact. At Victory Road he defeated Tommy Dreamer. At Bound for Glory, Myers participated in the Call Your Shot Gauntlet match, but was unsuccessful. On the October 27 episode of Impact, Swoggle helped Tommy Dreamer in defeating Myers in a hardcore match by hitting Myers with a low blow. Later, it was announced that Myers would face Swoggle in a match at Turning Point. At Turning Point, Myers defeated Swoggle. At No Surrender, Myers and Hernandez defeated Eddie Edwards and Matt Cardona. At Sacrifice, Myers lost to Eddie Edwards in a Hold Harmless match. At Hardcore Justice, Myers lost to Jake Something in a Blindfold match. At Rebellion, Myers defeated his former tag team partner, Matt Cardona. At Slammiversary, Myers teamed with Tenille Dashwood and were defeated by Matt Cardona and a returning Chelsea Green.

After Slammiversary, Myers began leading a stable called The Learning Tree, consisting of himself and young upstart rookies who "needed his help learning the business". The Learning Tree originally consisted of just Sam Beale and himself but the group later added Zicky Dice, Manny Lemons and Create A Pro graduate VSK. On the August 12 episode of Impact!, Myers won a Battle Royal match to become the number one contender for Christian Cage's Impact World Championship at Emergence. On August 20, at the event, Myers faced Cage in a losing effort. On the February 17, 2022 episode of Impact!, Myers cut Dice and VSK and ended The Learning Tree.

==== The Major Players (2022–2023) ====
On April 15, 2022 episode of Impact!, Myers reunited with Cardona and attacked W. Morrissey during an in-ring promo, with the help of Chelsea Green. At the end of the segment, they smashed Morrisey through a table. Later in the show, Green gave Mickie James a cheap shot and then knocked her down with Myers and Cardona's help. On May 28, Swann defeated Matt Cardona at the Vegas Vacation event held by The Wrestling Revolver to win the Impact Digital Media Championship for the first time. Afterwards, Cardona refused to give up the title, attacked Swann after the match, and made it off with the title belt. On the June 9 episode of Impact!, Cardona appeared on a Zoom call with tag team partner Brian Myers, "relinquishing" the title to the latter after suffering a torn bicep. Myers challenged Swann to a Digital Media Championship match at Slammiversary to determine the "real" champion, where Swann defeated Myers to retain the title. At Against All Odds, Myers defeated Swann in a Dot Combat match, winning his first single title in the company. At Emergence he retained the title against Bhupinder Gujjar. After a controversial disqualification victory in an Impact Digital Media Championship match against Bhupinder Gujjar, Brian Myers would settle his feud with Gujjar by defeating him in a ladder match on the September 22 episode of Impact!. A week later, Myers would successfully defend his title against Crazzy Steve. After the match, a cocky Myers would brag about his title reign and declare he doesn't have competition before issuing an open challenge for his title at Bound for Glory. Later in the show, it was announced that the match will take place on the Countdown to Bound for Glory pre-show. At Bound for Glory he retained the title against the debuting Dirty Dango. Successively, he reunited with Cardona and together they picked up a win against Alex Shelley after Myers hit Shelley with the Impact Digital Media Championship belt. This win earned The Major Players a tag team title match against Heath and Rhino at Over Drive. On October 22, 2022 Myers lost the title against Joe Hendry on an early taping of Impact!.

==== The System (2023–present) ====
On April 16 at Rebellion, Myers fought for Team Bully and lost a 10-wrestler Hardcore War against Team Dreamer. On the June 15 episode of Impact!, Myers approached Moose to offer to team with him against Impact World Tag Team Champions ABC (Ace Austin and Chris Bey). On July 15 at Slammiversary, Myers and Moose was involved in the Impact World Tag Team Championship four-way tag team match, which was won by Subculture (Mark Andrews and Flash Morgan Webster). On August 8 at episode of Impact, Myers unsuccessfully challenged for the Impact World Championship against Alex Shelley. On August 27 at Emergence, Myers teamed with Moose, Bully Ray and Lio Rush defeating Josh Alexander and Time Machine (Alex Shelley, Chris Sabin and Kushida). On October 21 at Bound for Glory, Myers was a participant in the 20-person Intergender Call Your Shot Gauntlet match, eliminating Jake Something, Sonny Kiss and Frankie Kazarian before being eliminated by Matt Cardona. On December 9, 2023 at Final Resolution, Myers teamed up with Eddie Edwards to unsuccessfully challenge ABC for the Impact World Tag Team Championship.

On January 13, 2024 at the "Countdown to TNA Hard to Kill", Myers and Edwards defeated Eric Young and Frankie Kazarian pre-show. During a backstage interview, Edwards, Myers, Alisha Edwards, Moose and DeAngelo Williams would form a stable calling themselves "The System". The stable later accompanied Moose to his main event match for the TNA World Championship against Alex Shelley. During the match, Edwards and the rest of The System attempted to distract Shelley, prompting a brawl with Shelley's partners, Chris Sabin and Kushida. Moose later won the match. On February 23 at the "Countdown to No Surrender", Myers and Edwards defeated Intergalactic Jet Setters (Kevin Knight and Kushida). On March 8 at Sacrifice, Myers and Edwards defeated ABC (Chris Bey and Ace Austin) to win the TNA World Tag Team Championship, this marked his second reign with the TNA World Tag Team Championship. On April 20 at Rebellion, Edwards and Myers retained the titles against Speedball Mountain (Mike Bailey and Trent Seven). On May 3 at Under Siege, The System defeated "Broken" Matt Hardy and Speedball Mountain (Trent Seven and Mike Bailey). On June 14 at Against All Odds, Edwards and Myers retained the titles against The Nemeth Brothers (Nic Nemeth and Ryan Nemeth). On July 20 at Slammiversary, Edwards and Myers lost the TNA World Tag Team Championship to ABC, ending their reign at 134 days. On September 13 at Victory Road, Myers and Edwards defeated ABC for the TNA Tag Team Championships. At the 2024 Bound for Glory Pay-Per-View, Eddie Edwards and Bryan Myers lost the TNA World Tag Team Championships to The Hardys in a Full Metal Mayhem match. This was a three way tag team match that also involved ABC. On November 29 at Turning Point, Myers competed in the Thanksgiving Turkey Bowl match, where he was pinned by Joe Hendry and per the stipulation, he was forced to wear a turkey suit. This match also involved Eric Young, Hammerstone, John Skyler, and Rhino. Over a month later on the December 5 episode of Impact!, The System would invoke their rematch clause to challenge The Hardys for the titles, only for the match to end via disqualification due to Alisha Edwards interfering. The System continued to beat down The Hardys, ending when they put the champions through a table. As a result, TNA later announced that The Hardys and The System would face off once again for the TNA World Tag Team Championship at Final Resolution in a tables match. At the event, Edwards and Myers failed to regain the TNA World Tag Team Championships.

On April 11 at Rebellion, Bear Bronson and Brian Myers defeated The Hardys to win the TNA World Tag Team Championship. They would lose the titles back to The Hardys in a four-way ladder match at Slammiversary on June 28, ending their reign at 78 days.

== Other media ==
Myers' first venture into YouTube came in the form of a short lived YouTube series called Callin' Spots with Curt Hawkins, which lasted only two episodes. His first video has since been deleted but has kept up his second video where he thanks Edge for giving him his first opportunity in WWE which was being part of La Familia and for being a friend and mentor.

Hawkins also appeared in Zack Ryder's YouTube series, Z! True Long Island Story. After sporadically appearing on the show he became a regular on the show. Hawkins and Reks have appeared on the show together also. One of Hawkins most memorable segments came after Zack Ryder started to use a cane on his show. Scott Stanford, another regular on the show, has come up to Hawkins and Reks saying that they are using the Broski Cane, this has annoyed the pair on every occasion stating that Hawkins used a cane first.

Hawkins and Reks created an animated YouTube series called MidCard Mafia in 2011, but the show upset WWE management, so Hawkins and Reks cancelled the series and removed the uploaded shows.

Hawkins also appeared in multiple episodes of WWE Inbox, a show where Superstars and Divas answer questions submitted by fans on Twitter. On episode five of Santino Marella's "Foreign Exchange", Marella and Yoshi Tatsu gave him their spare change after seeing him wearing his "Change for NXT" shirt. Hawkins was also a supporting actor in the film (Romance) In the Digital Age. In 2018, Hawkins started a podcast with Zack Ryder about wrestling figures called The Major Wrestling Figure Podcast. Ever since their WWE release, they began hosting the podcast under their current in-ring names Brian Myers and Matt Cardona respectively. The two have also started their own wrestling figure toy line titled Big Rubber Guys.

=== Video games ===
Myers made his video game debut in WWE SmackDown vs. Raw 2009 as Curt Hawkins. He later returned to the series in WWE 2K18. He also appears in WWE 2K19 and in WWE 2K20 and the mobile game WWE SuperCard.

== Personal life ==
While he was inactive in WWE, in 2014, Myers and fellow New Yorker wrestler Pat Buck opened a wrestling school in Hicksville, New York called Create A Pro Wrestling Academy.

Myers married his long time girlfriend, Elizabeth "Lizzie" Karcher on October 9, 2015. The couple has two daughters together, McKenzie, born on June 14, 2017, and Madison, born on June 26, 2020.

He is good friends with Matt Cardona and Trent Beretta in real life as they trained together during the early years of their careers. He was also a friend of late wrestler Brodie Lee.

Myers has a large collection of sports cards and wrestling figures, the latter of which he often shares with Matt Cardona on their podcast, The Major Wrestling Figure Podcast, and most recently with Mark Sterling. He is also a life long New York Mets supporter, with much of his in-ring gear being inspired by the team.

== Championships and accomplishments ==
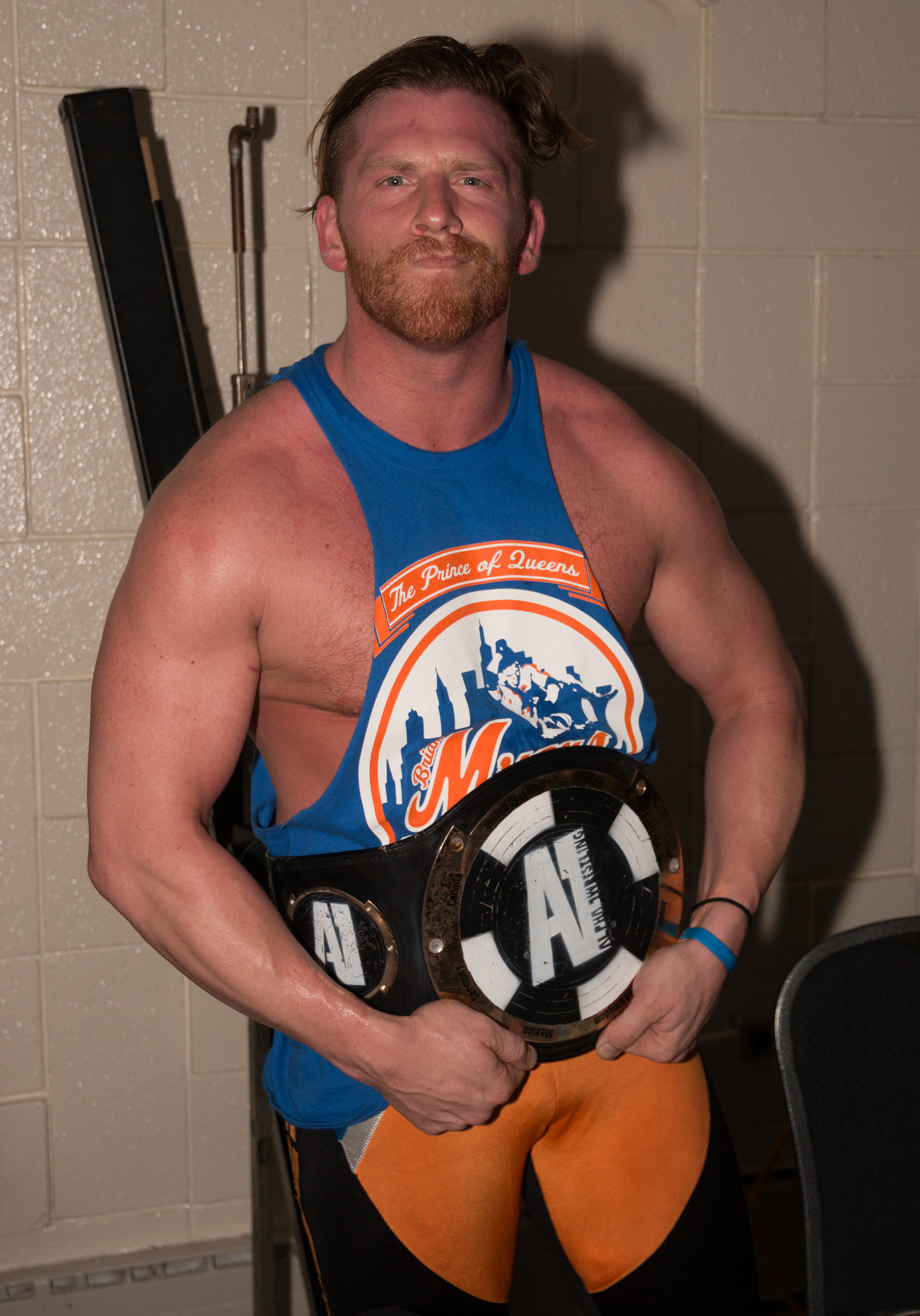
Myers with the A1 Alpha Male Champion

- Alpha-1 Wrestling
  - A1 Alpha Male Championship (1 time)
- Create A Pro Wrestling
  - CAP Tag Team Championship (2 times) – with Mark Sterling (1) and Eddie Edwards (1)
- Deep South Wrestling
  - DSW Tag Team Championship (2 times) – with Brett Majors
- Five Borough Wrestling
  - FBW Heavyweight Championship (1 time)
- Florida Championship Wrestling
  - FCW Florida Tag Team Championship (1 time)^{1} – with Caylen Croft and Trent Barreta
- Figure Wrestling Federation
  - FWF Tag Team Championship (1 time) – with Captain Joe Shoes
- Grim Toy Show Wrestling
  - GTS YouTube Wrestling Figures Heavyweight Championship (1 time)
- Ohio Valley Wrestling
  - OVW Southern Tag Team Championship (1 time) – with Brett Majors
- New York Wrestling Connection
  - NYWC Tag Team Championship (2 times) – with Brett Matthews
- Premier Wrestling Federation
  - PWF New Jersey Tag Team Championship (1 time) – with Brett Matthews
- Pro Wrestling Illustrated
  - Ranked No. 128 of the top 500 singles wrestlers in the PWI 500 in 2019
- Pro Wrestling Syndicate
  - PWS Television Championship (2 times, inaugural)
  - PWS Television Title Tournament (2015)
- Square Circle Expo
  - SCX Prime Championship (1 time, current)
- Total Nonstop Action Wrestling / Impact Wrestling
  - Impact Digital Media Championship (1 time)
  - TNA World Tag Team Championship (4 times) – with Trevor Lee (1), Eddie Edwards (2) and Bear Bronson (1)
  - TNA Year End Awards (1 time)
    - Faction of the Year (2025) as The System
  - Turkey Bowl (2025)
- World Wrestling Entertainment/WWE
  - WWE (Raw) Tag Team Championship (2 times) – with Zack Ryder
- WrestlePro
  - WrestlePro Tag Team Championship (1 time) – with Joey Janela
