= Jesse and Festus =

Professional wrestling tag team

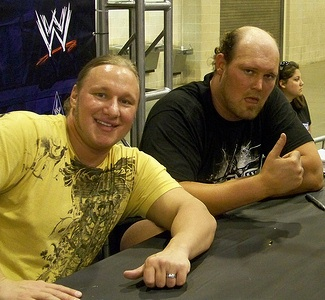
- Jesse (left) and Festus (right) at an autograph signing

Tag team
- Name(s): Jesse and Festus; The Dalton Boys; Biscuits and Gravy
- Members: Jesse Dalton/Jesse; Festus Dalton/Festus
- Billed heights: 5 ft 10 in (1.78 m) - Jesse; 6 ft 7 in (2.01 m) - Festus
- Combined billed weight: 501 lb (227 kg)
- Billed from: Georgia
- Debut: October 5, 2007
- Disbanded: April 13, 2009
- Years active: 2007–2009

Jesse and Festus, also once known as The Dalton Boys, were an American professional wrestling tag team in the WWE made up of Ray Gordy (Jesse) and Drew Hankinson (Festus).

== History ==
=== World Wrestling Entertainment ===
==== Ohio Valley Wrestling (2007) ====
On the May 11, 2007 episode of SmackDown!, a vignette aired suggesting that Ray Gordy would be repackaged as "Jesse Dalton" as part of a tag team using a hillbilly gimmick, alongside fellow WWE developmental talent Drew Hankinson (formerly "The Imposter Kane") who was repackaged as "Festus Dalton". It was reported on June 2, 2007 that the "Dalton Boys" gimmick was dropped by WWE, with the kayfabe explanation given that they had "lost their way" to the arena. Gordy and Hankinson were sent back to a development territory. Gordy continued to use the Dalton name in OVW and Hankinson used the name "Justice Dalton". They also wore more traditional wrestling tights.

==== SmackDown (2007–2009) ====
On the June 29, 2007 episode of SmackDown!, vignettes hyping Jesse and Festus's return to the roster, sans the Dalton name (and no longer presented as brothers), began to air. Their vignettes were billed as 'Jesse and Festus on...', each week choosing a different subject but always with the same formula of Jesse, talking very excitedly about the subject, and ending each vignette by pointing to Festus and saying "that, that is the face of a" (something relating to the topic), while Festus merely stared absently into the camera. They wrestled in dark matches and at SmackDown! and ECW house shows. Their in-ring debut came on the October 5, 2007 episode of SmackDown! by defeating Mike Tolar and Chad Collyer when Festus used an over-the-shoulder gutbuster and pinned Tolar. This match introduced the gimmick of Festus' Pavlovian response to the ring bell: when the opening bell rang, Festus's persona changed into a very focused, aggressive competitor, as compared to the aloof, absent-minded character he had been portrayed as; when the closing bell rang, Festus returned to his "normal" self.

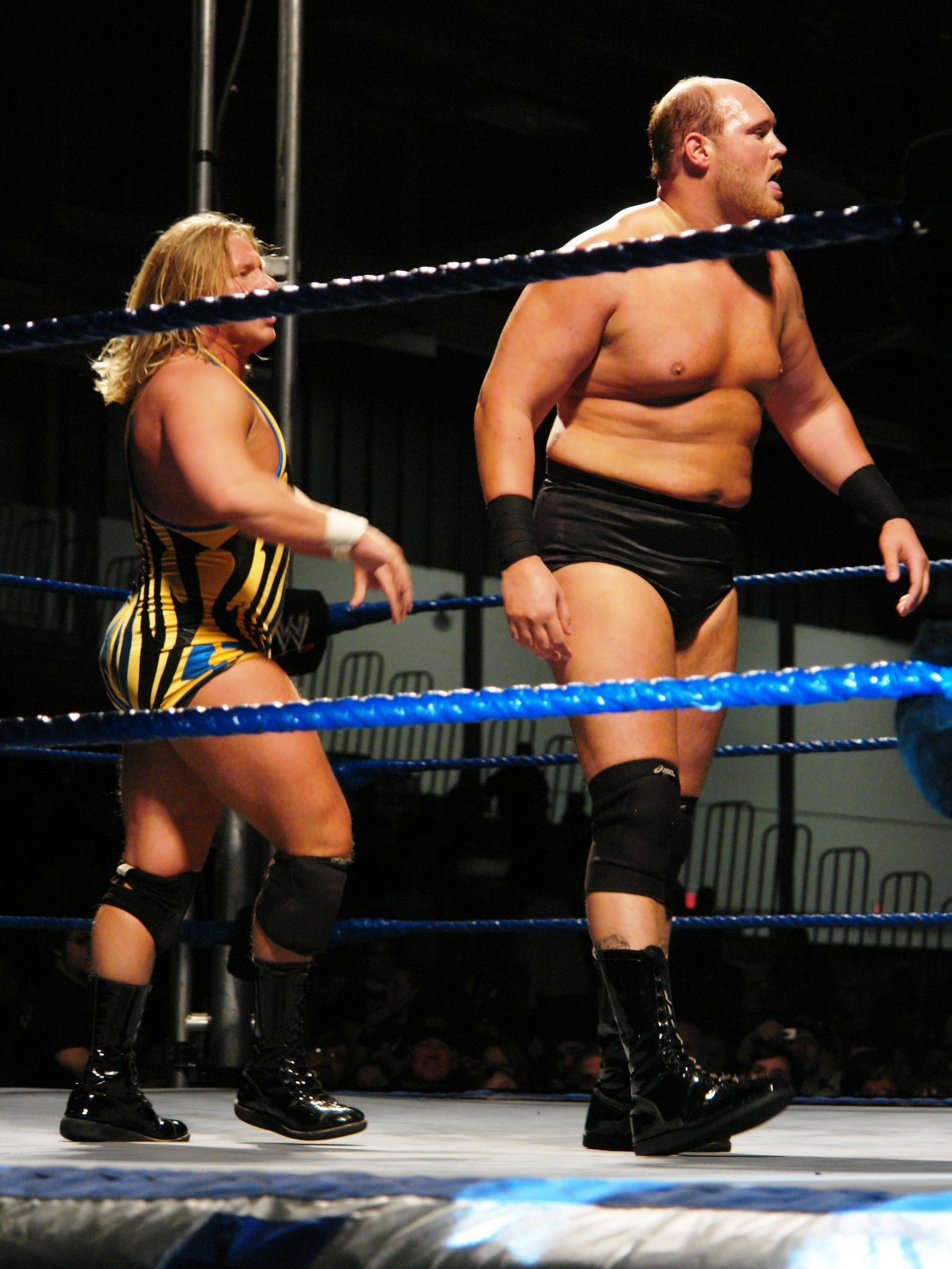
Jesse (left) and Festus (right) in the ring

On the October 16, 2007 episode of ECW, Jesse and Festus made their debut for the ECW brand in conjunction with a "Talent Exchange" discussed between ECW General Manager Armando Estrada and acting SmackDown General Manager Vickie Guerrero. Jesse and Festus defeated their first notable opponents, the team of Elijah Burke and Nunzio, with the Rocket Launcher.

On the November 9 episode of SmackDown!, Jesse and Festus suffered their first WWE loss in a 10-man tag team battle royal WWE Tag Team Championship contender's match, against Deuce 'n Domino, The Major Brothers, Shannon Moore and Jimmy Wang Yang, and Drew McIntyre and Dave Taylor. Festus, the biggest man in the ring and obviously a threat, was eliminated early due to a team effort from the other teams. Thus, Jesse was eliminated as well.

Jesse and Festus suffered their second loss in the WWE when they were defeated by then-WWE Tag Team Champions John Morrison and the Miz on the November 27 episode of ECW. Jesse and Festus were defeated again by Miz and Morrison on the December 7 episode of SmackDown!. Jesse and Festus finally defeated The Miz and John Morrison in a non-title match on December 16.

After a brief hiatus, more vignettes aired, this time featuring Jesse, who explained Festus's condition and spoke of a cure for it. The team returned on the February 8, 2008 episode of SmackDown, defeating Deuce 'n Domino. Festus appeared to be unchanged, aside from perhaps being more aggressive than ever. This success continued as they once again defeated The Miz and John Morrison in another non-title match on the February 29 airing of SmackDown. When they received a shot at the titles on the March 21 episode, however, they came up short, and similarly lost out months later at The Great American Bash, when the titles changed hands to Curt Hawkins and Zack Ryder courtesy of a pin on Jesse.

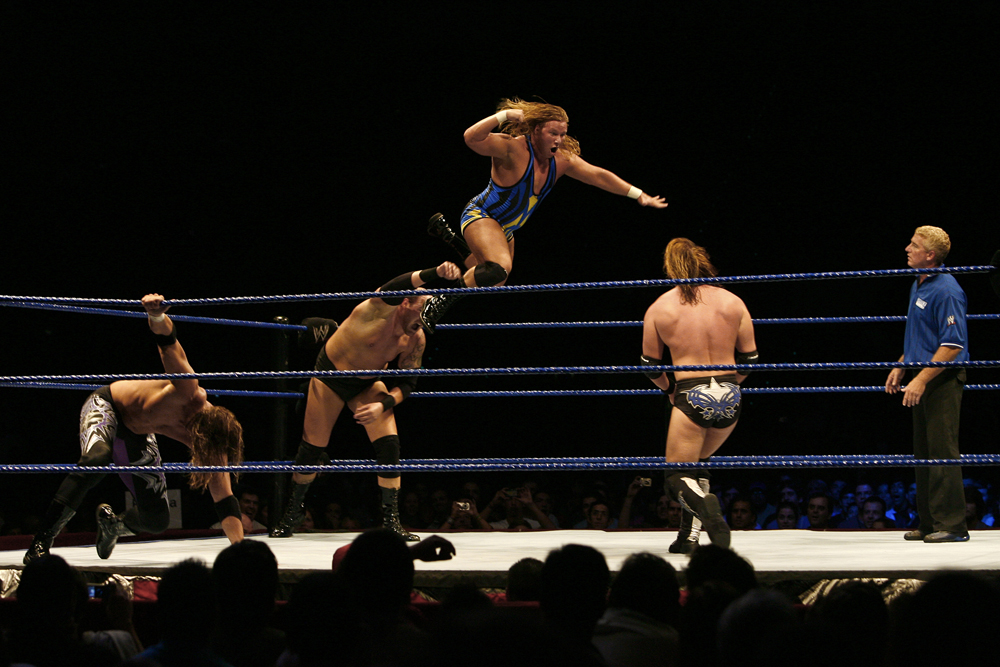
Jesse and Festus wrestling Curt Hawkins and Zack Ryder

On the September 12 airing of SmackDown Jesse and Festus made their way to the ring dressed in moving attire complete with a hand truck, large cardboard box and moving supplies. After an attack from Kenny Dykstra the duo proceeded to package Dykstra up and roll him away. The next week they did the same thing to Ryan Braddock and later the set of Carlito's Cabana. The gimmick highlighted SmackDown's move to MyNetworkTV, complete with overalls bearing the parodic company title of "MyMoving Company". After the show's move, however, they reverted to their previous gimmick.

==== Split (2009–2010) ====
The team was separated when Festus was drafted to the Raw brand in the 2009 Supplemental Draft. Gordy adopted a new in-ring persona, a white rapper called "Slam Master J". After months of inactivity, Festus returned to SmackDown as Luke Gallows, and became an enforcer for CM Punk. Punk claimed that the Festus gimmick was due to Festus being addicted to pills, but Punk had managed to cure him. J and Gallows also took part in the 26-man battle royal at WrestleMania XXVI, which was won by Yoshi Tatsu.

Ray Gordy was released from his WWE contract on April 22, 2010 along with several other talents and retired from wrestling. Drew Hankinson was also released from his WWE contract on November 19, 2010 with several other superstars, only to eventually return in 2016 with new tag team partner Karl Anderson before being released in 2020. He returned for a second time in 2022 and was released again in 2025.
