= The Colóns (2000s tag team) =

Professional wrestling tag team

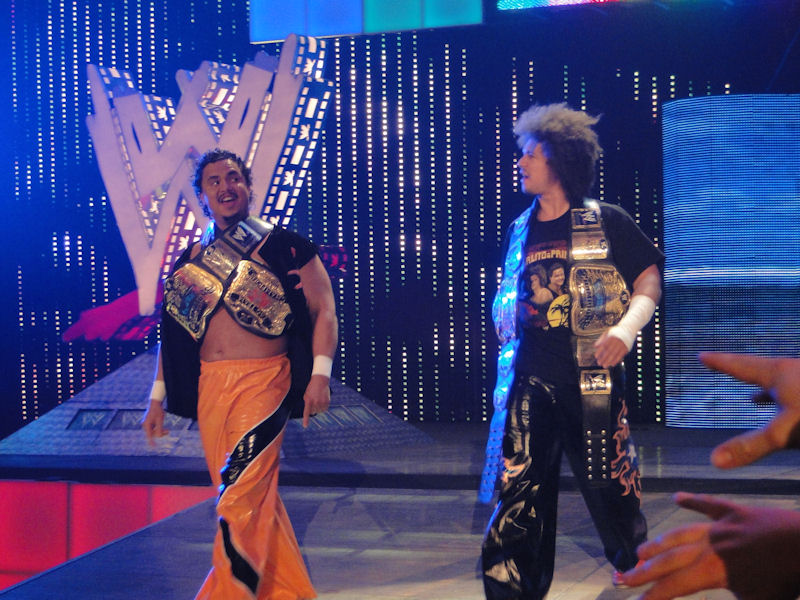
- Primo (left) and Carlito (right) as Unified Tag Team Champions

Tag team
- Members: Carlito/Carly Colón; Primo/Eddie Colón
- Name(s): Carlito and Primo; The Colón Brothers; The Colóns
- Billed heights: Carlito: 5 ft 10 in (1.78 m); Primo: 5 ft 10 in (1.78 m)
- Combined billed weight: 430 lb (200 kg)
- Hometown: San Juan, Puerto Rico
- Billed from: San Juan, Puerto Rico
- Debut: 2001
- Disbanded: 2026
- Years active: 2001-2003; 2008-2009; 2010; 2021; 2023; 2026

The Colóns were a Puerto Rican professional wrestling tag team who consisted of real-life brothers, Carlito and Primo. The team worked for World Wrestling Entertainment (WWE). They were the first-ever Unified WWE Tag Team Champions, being holders of both the WWE Tag Team Championship and World Tag Team Championship.

Their father is former professional wrestler Carlos Colón Sr., and they initially began teaming together in his promotion, World Wrestling Council and held the WWC World Tag Team Championship. In 2008, they began teaming together in WWE, when Primo debuted on SmackDown alongside his brother. In their debut as a tag team within the promotion, they defeated then-WWE Tag Team Champions Curt Hawkins and Zack Ryder. This win earned them a title opportunity two weeks later, in which they were also successful. At WrestleMania XXV they became the first team to unify both tag team title sets by defeating John Morrison and The Miz.

== History ==
=== World Wrestling Council (2001-2003, 2008, 2009) ===
The Colóns initially began teaming in their father's company, World Wrestling Council (WWC) in 2001. They defeated the tag team of Thunder and Lightning for the WWC World Tag Team Championship on March 16, 2002. They lost the title to Thunder and Lightning the following day. They teamed together until 2003 when Carlito signed with the WWE.

While Carilto was still with WWE, they reunited with and teamed with their cousin Epico Colon on January 6, 2008 when they defeated Chris Masters, Ron Killings and Black Pain.

At Lockout 2008, the brothers performed in the promotion for the first time since teaming in WWE. Although they were not booked in a match, The Colóns hosted a segment of Carlito's Cabana with David Sierra as the invited guest. In this segment, the promotion tried to explain why Eddie was renamed to "Primo", claiming that he wanted to preserve Eddie Guerrero's legacy by not using his actual name. On May 20, 2009, The Colóns issued an open challenge to any tag team for Aniversario 2009, the promotion's anniversary event.

=== World Wrestling Entertainment (2008-2009, 2010) ===
==== Unified WWE Tag Team Champions (2008–2009) ====
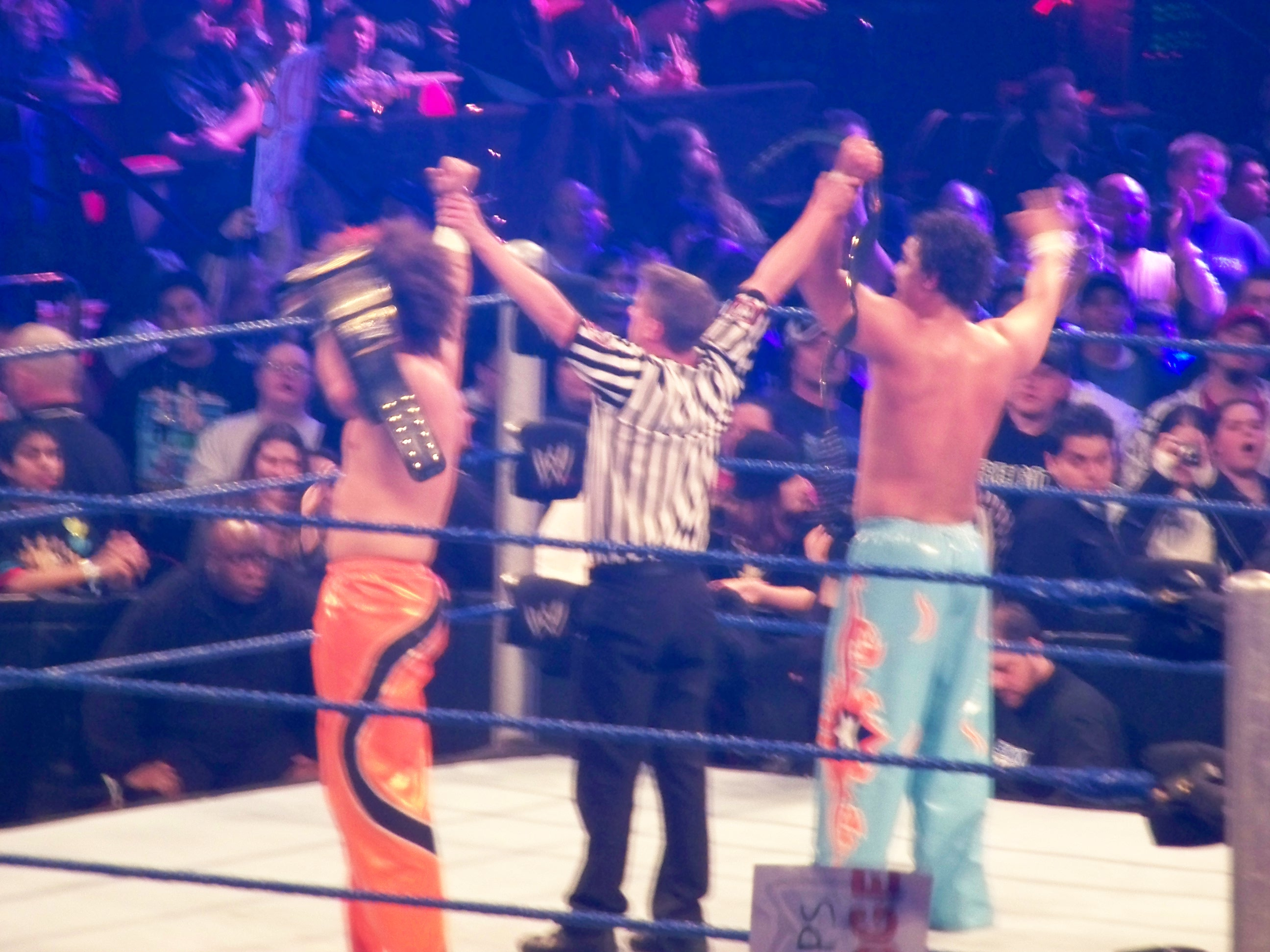
The Colóns as WWE Tag Team Champions

Soon after Primo debuted in WWE, he became a full-time member of the SmackDown roster, along with his brother. They defeated WWE Tag Team Champions Curt Hawkins and Zack Ryder in their first match as a team to gain victory on September 12, 2008. Two weeks later, both teams competed in a title match, with The Colóns winning to become tag team champions.

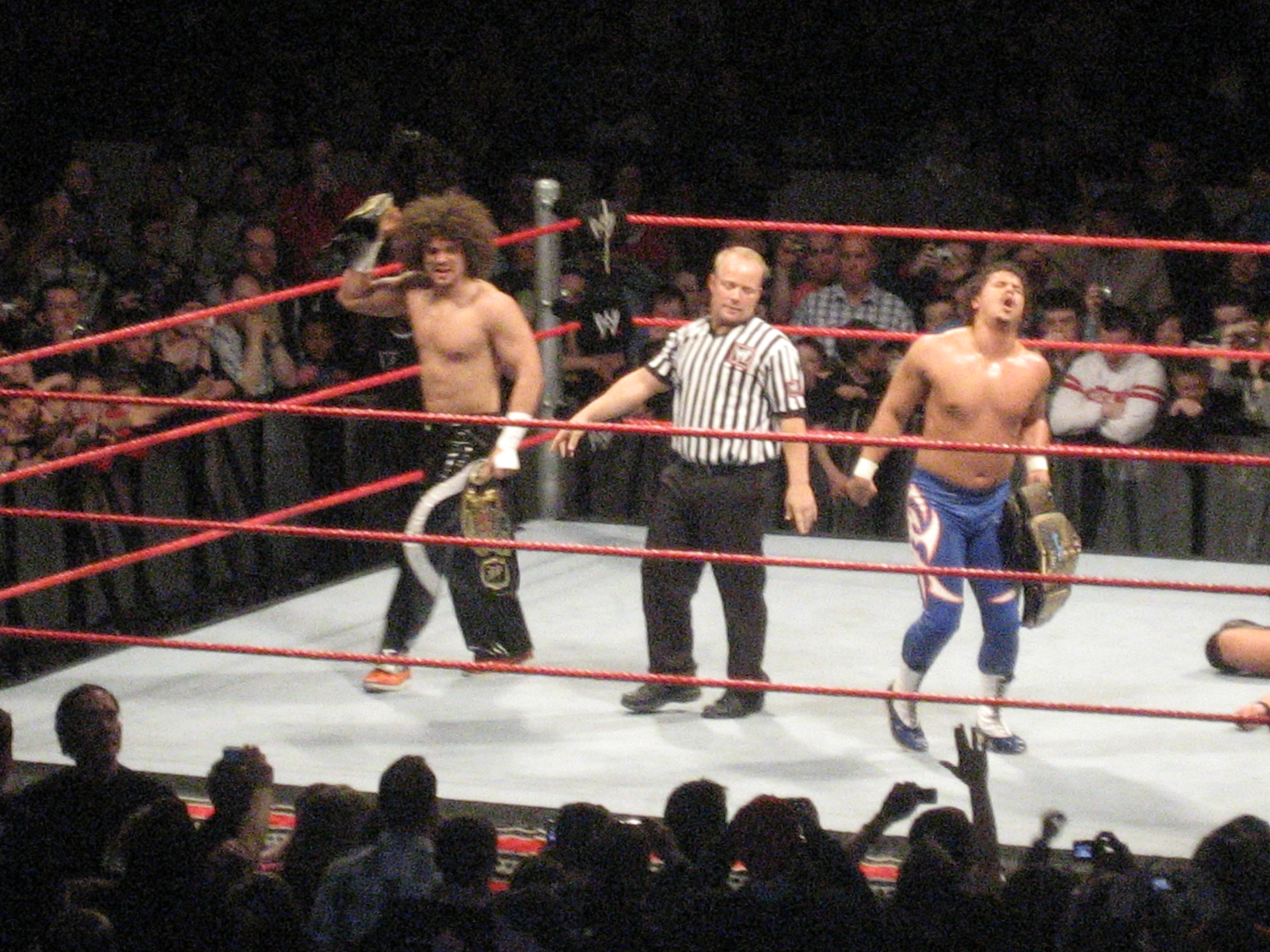
The Colóns as the Unified Tag Team Champions

Starting in November, The Colóns developed an on-screen relationship with The Bella Twins (Nikki and Brie), appearing in numerous backstage segments with them and The Bellas accompanied them to the ring. This relationship with the Bella Twins subsequently led to a feud with the World Tag Team Champions John Morrison and The Miz, as Morrison and The Miz flirted with The Bella Twins, and then defeated Carlito and Primo to win a date with them on Valentine's Day. The Bella were seemingly unable to choose between the teams, leading to Morrison and The Miz challenging The Colóns for the WWE Tag Team Championship, and The Colóns challenging Morrison and The Miz for the World Tag Team Championship, although each team retained their respective championship. The rivalry between the teams led The Bella Twins to fall out with each other, with Brie siding with the Colóns, and Nikki siding with Morrison and The Miz. On the WrestleMania 25 pre-show, The Colóns defeated Morrison and The Miz to win the World Tag Team Championship and become the Unified WWE Tag Team Champions, and they successfully defended the championships the following night on Raw.

On April 15, the Colóns were drafted back to the Raw brand as part of the 2009 Supplemental Draft. On April 27, the Colóns made their debut on Raw, defeating Jamie Noble and Chavo Guerrero. The team's collective WWE Superstars debut took place on May 28, 2009, when they defeated The World's Greatest Tag Team by pinfall.

==== Split and brief reformation (2009–2010) ====
They lost the championship at The Bash to the team of Edge and Chris Jericho, who were added to a standard tag team match between the Colóns and The Legacy (Cody Rhodes and Ted DiBiase) moments before the match started. Carlito and Primo invoked their rematch clause the next night on Raw, but were unsuccessful, and on the July 6 episode of Raw, they lost again to Jericho and Edge. One week later, the team officially disbanded when Carlito attacked Primo.

The team reunited on the May 6, 2010 episode of Superstars when Carlito stopped the match and offered Primo to reform as a team. Primo accepted the offer, turning him heel in the process. On the May 10 episode of Raw, Colóns brutally attacked R-Truth. The duo then shook hands with Ted DiBiase after getting paid with DiBiase's "Trust Fund." The reunion of the team would be short lived, as on May 21, Carlito was released due to a violation of the WWE Wellness Program and subsequent refusal to attend a rehabilitation facility.

While Primo went on to form the second incarnation of The Colóns, with their cousin Epico. On April 5, 2014, Carlito, Primo and Epico inducted Carlos Colon Sr. into the WWE Hall of Fame. Primo along with Epico were released by WWE in April 2020 due to the COVID-19 pandemic.

=== Reunions (2021, 2023, 2026) ===
After Primo was released by WWE, he reunited with Carlito on January 17, 2021 at CCW Homecoming in Pompano Beach, Florida, losing to (Ariel Levy and Vinicious). They returned to World Wrestling Council on March 25, 2023, defeating Gilbert and Ray Gonzalez. In May 16, 2026 in Furia Extrema defeated Ray González and El Paparazzi, after in Aniversario 53, the brothers were defeated by Chicano and La Amenaza Bryan in an Extreme Rules Dumpster Match. Then after the main event of Aniversario, Carlito betrayed Eddie joining his cousin Orlando Colón and Chicano, bringing and end to the team.

== Championships and accomplishments ==
- Puerto Rico Wrestling

- Tag Team of the Year (2008)

- World Wrestling Council

- WWC World Tag Team Championship (1 time)

- World Wrestling Entertainment

- World Tag Team Championship (1 time)
- WWE Tag Team Championship (1 time)

== See also ==
- Primo and Epico
