= 2009 WWE Draft =

WWE's intra-brand draft

2009 WWE draft

General information
- Sport: Professional wrestling
- Date: April 13, 2009
- Location: Atlanta, Georgia

Overview
- League: World Wrestling Entertainment
- Teams: Raw; SmackDown; ECW

The 2009 World Wrestling Entertainment (WWE) draft was the seventh WWE draft, produced by the American professional wrestling promotion World Wrestling Entertainment. The draft had two parts: the first part was televised live for three hours on April 13; the second part, the "supplemental draft", was held the same day immediately following the televised portion. The first part was broadcast on WWE's program Raw on the USA Network in the United States, (Note: In addition to the United States, Raw is held in various countries which have different channels.) and the supplemental draft was available on the Internet, at WWE's official website. The televised portion was held in Atlanta, Georgia, at Philips Arena. The 2009 WWE draft marked the third time that the Raw, SmackDown, and ECW brands were featured in the draft; wrestlers, general managers and commentators were all eligible to be drafted from the company's roster. For the televised half, matches determined which brand received a random draft selection. During the supplemental draft, brand and employee selections were made at random. Due to draft regulations, drafted champions took their titles to their new brands, and tag teams were not exempt from being selected. As a result, the draft impacted championships and split tag teams.

Overall, 36 draft selections were made, the most since the original draft in 2002 (which featured 57 selections). Twelve selections were made on television; six were made by Raw, five by SmackDown, and one by ECW. All of the draftees were wrestlers: 28 males (10 drafted on television) and 8 females (2 drafted on television). Raw obtained the first overall pick in the draft by winning the first match, which resulted in the acquisition of United States Champion Montel Vontavious Porter from SmackDown. Women's Champion Melina from Raw was SmackDown's first selection. ECW's sole televised draft pick was Vladimir Kozlov from SmackDown. Additionally, SmackDown's WWE Champion Triple H was drafted by Raw, resulting in SmackDown's loss of its prime championship. At the end of the televised portion, the final draft choices were Intercontinental Champion Rey Mysterio of Raw by SmackDown, replacing the loss of the United States Champion, and SmackDown's Divas Champion Maryse by Raw, replacing the loss of the Women's Champion.

In the supplemental draft, Mr. Kennedy, who was sidelined with a non-scripted shoulder injury, was drafted from SmackDown to Raw as the first (13th overall) supplemental pick. SmackDown obtained Shad Gaspard from Raw as their first (14th overall) supplemental selection. Ezekiel Jackson was ECW's first supplemental pick. Unified WWE Tag Team Champions The Colóns (Carlito and Primo) were drafted from SmackDown to Raw; this left SmackDown without a tag team championship (although the tag team champions can appear on all 3 brands). Brie Bella (from SmackDown to Raw), Charlie Haas (from Raw to SmackDown), and Hurricane Helms (from SmackDown to ECW) were the final supplemental picks.

== Background ==
In March 2002, the Brand Extension storyline was initiated. WWE's Raw and SmackDown! television programs were made into brands that employees were assigned to work; the ECW brand was later added in 2006. With the exception of 2003, WWE has held the draft annually since its inception.

Via its website on February 11, WWE announced that the 2009 Draft was to take place on April 13 at Philips Arena in Atlanta, Georgia. All wrestlers, general managers, and commentators were eligible to be drafted. A supplemental draft was announced for April 15. It was announced on the day of the televised draft that for the third consecutive year, matches would determine which brand received a draft pick, and that 12 wrestlers were to switch brands. As in previous drafts, the purpose of the 2009 WWE draft was to increase television ratings of WWE programming and to refresh the roster with new storylines for each brand.

== Selections ==
=== Televised draft ===
During Raw, 10 matches were held among representatives of the three brands to determine which would receive a draft pick; two of the matches were for two selections. Each match featured a wrestler representing their brand; if a wrestler was drafted earlier in the program, they would represent their new brand. After the matches, a computerized system, which appeared on the Raw stage TitanTron, randomly (Note: Although WWE claimed the draft was conducted randomly, the results were predetermined since the Draft is a storyline.) selected a member from the two opposing brands' rosters for the winning brand.

==== Matches ====
No.	Results	Stipulations
1	Rey Mysterio (Raw) defeated Evan Bourne (ECW)	Singles match for 1 draft pick
2	Kane (Raw) defeated The Brian Kendrick (SmackDown)	Singles match for 1 draft pick
3	Maryse, Michelle McCool, and Natalya (SmackDown) defeated Melina, Mickie James, and Kelly Kelly (Raw)	Six-woman tag team match for 1 draft pick
4	John Cena (Raw) defeated Jack Swagger (ECW)	Singles match for 2 draft picks
5	The Great Khali (SmackDown) defeated Santino Marella (Raw)	Singles match for 1 draft pick
6	Kofi Kingston (Raw) defeated The Miz (ECW)	Singles match for 1 draft pick
7	Edge (SmackDown) won by last eliminating Big Show (Raw) (Note: Other match participants: Raw; Cryme Tyme, MVP, and Mike Knox. SmackDown; Carlito, Chavo Guerrero, Primo, R- Truth, and Edge. ECW; Finlay, Mark Henry, Tyson Kidd, Paul Burchill, and Ricky Ortiz.)	Tri-branded 15-man Battle royal for 2 draft picks
8	Christian (ECW) defeated Shelton Benjamin (SmackDown)	Singles match for 1 draft pick
9	Matt Hardy (Note: Matt Hardy, originally a member of the SmackDown brand, was drafted to Raw before this match took place.) (Raw) defeated CM Punk (Note: CM Punk and Chris Jericho, originally members of the Raw brand, were drafted to SmackDown before this match took place.) (SmackDown)	Singles match for 1 draft pick
10	Chris Jericho (SmackDown) defeated Tommy Dreamer (ECW)	Singles match for 1 draft pick

==== Selections ====
Pick No.	Brand (to)	Superstar	Role	Brand (from)	Notes
1	Raw	MVP	Male wrestler	SmackDown	WWE United States Champion
2	Raw	Big Show	Male wrestler	SmackDown	
3	SmackDown	Melina	Female wrestler	Raw	WWE Women's Champion
4	Raw	Matt Hardy	Male wrestler	SmackDown	
5	Raw	Triple H	Male wrestler	SmackDown	WWE Champion
6	SmackDown	CM Punk	Male wrestler	Raw	Money in the Bank contract holder
7	Raw	The Miz	Male wrestler	ECW	Split of John Morrison and The Miz
8	SmackDown	Kane	Male wrestler	Raw	
9	SmackDown	Chris Jericho	Male wrestler	Raw	
10	ECW	Vladimir Kozlov	Male wrestler	SmackDown	
11	Raw	Maryse	Female wrestler	SmackDown	WWE Divas Champion
12	SmackDown	Rey Mysterio	Male wrestler	Raw	WWE Intercontinental Champion

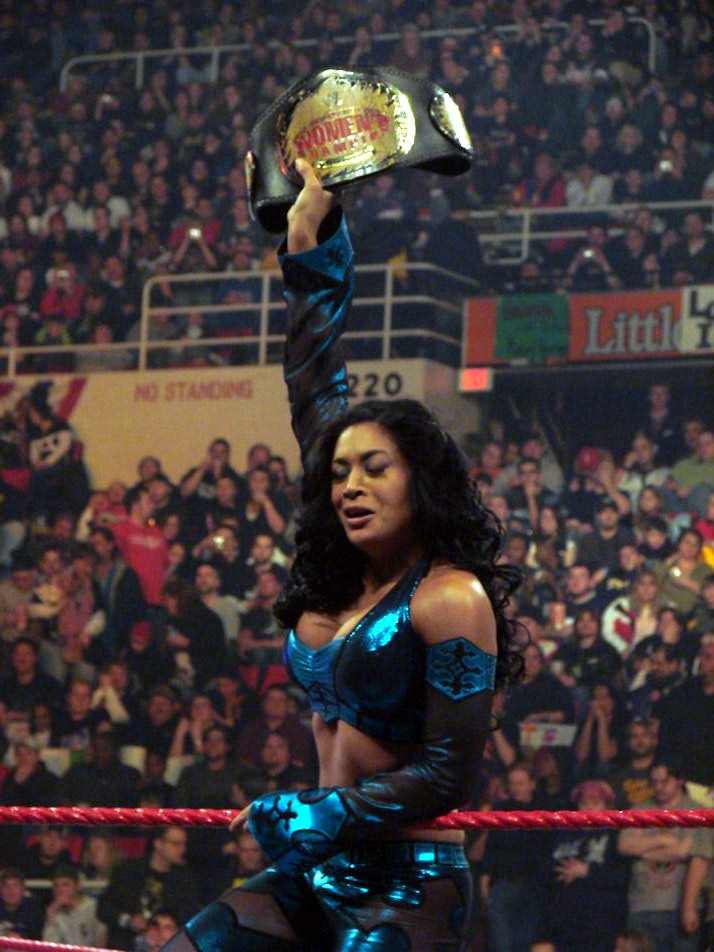
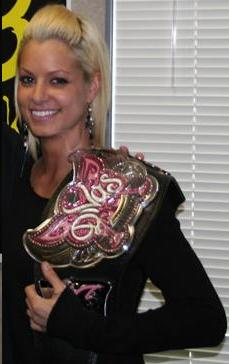
The first ever WWE female championship for WWE female championship female WWE draft pick trades in WWE history then WWE Women's Champion Melina and then WWE Divas Champion Maryse

=== Supplemental draft ===
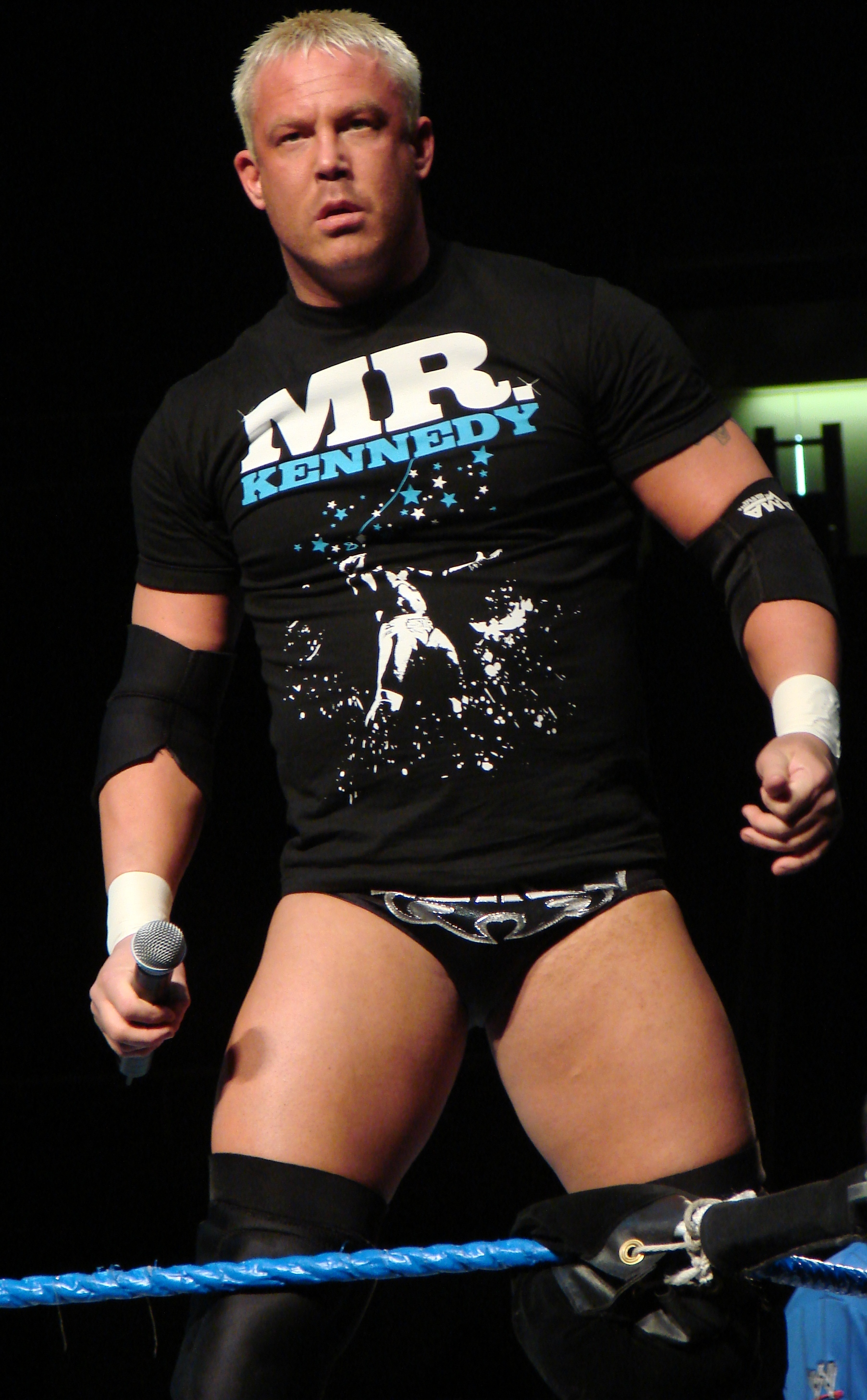
Mr. Kennedy was the 13th pick in the 2009 WWE draft

Pick No.	Brand (to)	Employee	Role	Brand (from)	Notes
13	Raw	Mr. Kennedy	Male wrestler	SmackDown	
14	SmackDown	Shad Gaspard	Male wrestler	Raw	Member of Cryme Tyme
15	SmackDown	Alicia Fox	Female wrestler	ECW	
16	Raw	Primo	Male wrestler	SmackDown	Member of The Colóns; World Tag Team Champion; WWE Tag Team Champion
17	SmackDown	Mike Knox	Male wrestler	Raw	
18	ECW	Ezekiel Jackson	Male wrestler	SmackDown	
19	Raw	Nikki Bella	Female wrestler	SmackDown	Member of The Bella Twins
20	SmackDown	Candice Michelle	Female wrestler	Raw	Never appeared on this brand as she was released from her contract
21	ECW	Zack Ryder	Male wrestler	SmackDown	Split of Curt Hawkins and Zack Ryder
22	Raw	Chavo Guerrero	Male wrestler	SmackDown	
23	SmackDown	Ricky Ortiz	Male wrestler	ECW	
24	SmackDown	Layla	Female wrestler	Raw	
25	Raw	Hornswoggle	Male wrestler	ECW	Split from Finlay
26	ECW	DH Smith	Male wrestler	SmackDown	
27	SmackDown	John Morrison	Male wrestler	ECW	Split of John Morrison and The Miz
28	Raw	Carlito	Male wrestler	SmackDown	Member of The Colóns; World Tag Team Champion; WWE Tag Team Champion
29	ECW	Natalya	Female wrestler	SmackDown	
30	Raw	Festus	Male wrestler	SmackDown	Split of Jesse and Festus
31	SmackDown	JTG	Male wrestler	Raw	Member of Cryme Tyme
32	SmackDown	Dolph Ziggler	Male wrestler	Raw	
33	Raw	The Brian Kendrick	Male wrestler	SmackDown	
34	SmackDown	Charlie Haas	Male wrestler	Raw	
35	ECW	Hurricane Helms	Male wrestler	SmackDown	
36	Raw	Brie Bella	Female wrestler	SmackDown	Member of The Bella Twins

== Aftermath ==
After the televised draft, Joey Styles, the Director of Digital Media Content for WWE's official website, interviewed the draftees on their reactions. The drafted wrestlers generally expressed approval of the draft and described what they hoped their experiences would be with their new brand. Seven of the wrestlers were champions with their original brand, and as outlined in the draft regulations, they carried their titles over to their new brand; this affected seven of nine championships. Champion draft selections included: Unified Tag Team Champions The Colóns (Carlito and Primo), United States Champion Montel Vontavious Porter, WWE Champion Triple H, and Divas Champion Maryse from SmackDown to Raw; Women's Champion Melina and Intercontinental Champion Rey Mysterio from Raw to SmackDown. Since Triple H was drafted to Raw, it left SmackDown without a world championship, as Raw now featured two of the three primary championships in WWE, the WWE and World Heavyweight Championships. Edge would bring the World Heavyweight Championship back to SmackDown two weeks later at Backlash when he defeated John Cena in a Last Man Standing Match. When MVP and Mysterio switched brands, the two secondary championships switched brands for the first time in WWE's history. Similarly, after Maryse and Melina switched brands, WWE's two female championships also switched brands for the first time. Though the Unified Tag Team Champions were both drafted to Raw from SmackDown, the titles were able to be defended on all three brands due to being unified.

Numerous tag teams were affected by the Draft overall. During the televised portion of the draft, ECW tag team John Morrison and The Miz was split up. The Miz was drafted to Raw and Morrison to SmackDown (during the supplemental draft). The Bella Twins (Brie and Nikki), Cryme Tyme (Shad Gaspard and JTG), and The Colóns were split up during the supplemental draft, although the duos went to the same brands afterward. SmackDown tag teams Jesse and Festus and Curt Hawkins and Zack Ryder were also split up, with Festus drafted to Raw and Ryder to ECW.

The draft had little effect on the television ratings for WWE's programming. Generally, the ratings of the three shows during the week of the draft were consistent with the ratings of each from the previous week. The ratings for WWE programming the week before the draft were the following: the April 6 episode of Raw was watched by 5.7 million viewers in its first hour and by 6.1 million viewers in its second hour for an average 3.9 rating, the April 7 episode of ECW on Sci Fi earned a 1.3 television rating, and Friday Night SmackDown earned a 2.0 television rating. (Note: Viewership details are not available for ECW on Sci Fi and Friday Night SmackDown because they are not top-rated programs; as a result, Nielsen Media Research does not publish that information.) The draft episode of Raw was watched by 4.7 million viewers in its first hour, 5.7 in its second hour, and 6.1 in the final hour for an average 3.7 television rating. Later that week, ECW on Sci Fi earned a 1.2 television rating, while Friday Night SmackDown earned a 2.0.

As stated by WWE commentator Jim Ross, the draft would not come into effect until after Backlash, when the final inter-brand matches took place.

== See also ==
- History of WWE
