= John Morrison and the Miz =

Professional wrestling tag team

John Morrison and The Miz
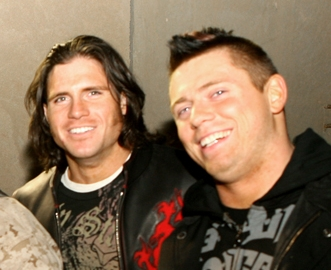
- John Morrison (left) and The Miz (right) in December 2008

Tag team
- Members: John Morrison; The Miz
- Name: John Morrison and The Miz
- Billed heights: Morrison: 6 ft 1 in (1.85 m); Miz: 6 ft 2 in (1.88 m)
- Combined billed weight: 436 lb (198 kg); Morrison: 215 lb (98 kg); Miz: 221 lb (100 kg)
- Debut: November 16, 2007
- Disbanded: August 23, 2021
- Years active: 2007–2009; 2020–2021

John Morrison and The Miz were an American professional wrestling tag team in WWE.

The duo originally performed on the ECW brand, but also appeared on the Raw and SmackDown brands due to ECW's talent exchanges with those brands during their tenure as a team. The team had no official name, although they had been referred to as "the In Crowd" or "the Dirt Sheet Duo", after the name of their Slammy Award-winning online webshow, The Dirt Sheet.

They first began teaming together in November 2007. Originally rivals, John Morrison and The Miz became partners as a result of winning the WWE Tag Team Championship and making the title exclusive to the ECW brand, for a brief time. They held the championship for 250 days, before eventually dropping the title in July 2008. During their title reign, Morrison and Miz developed a gimmick that resulted in the duo being given their own webshow, The Dirt Sheet, and their own in-ring interview segment of the same name on ECW. In December 2008, they won the World Tag Team Championship and the Slammy Award in the category for Tag Team of the Year. In April 2009, the duo lost the World Tag Team titles and was forced to disband after Miz was drafted to the Raw brand and Morrison was drafted to the SmackDown brand as part of the 2009 WWE Draft.

After the team disbanded, Morrison and Miz sporadically feuded with each other until Morrison's departure from WWE in November 2011. They reunited in January 2020 after Morrison returned to WWE. They won the SmackDown Tag Team Championships shortly thereafter.

The team of Morrison and Miz was critically acclaimed, especially during their first run when they were recognized as Tag Team of the Year by WWE, Wrestling Observer Newsletter, and The Baltimore Sun in 2008.

== History ==
=== Formation and WWE Tag Team Champions (2007–2008) ===
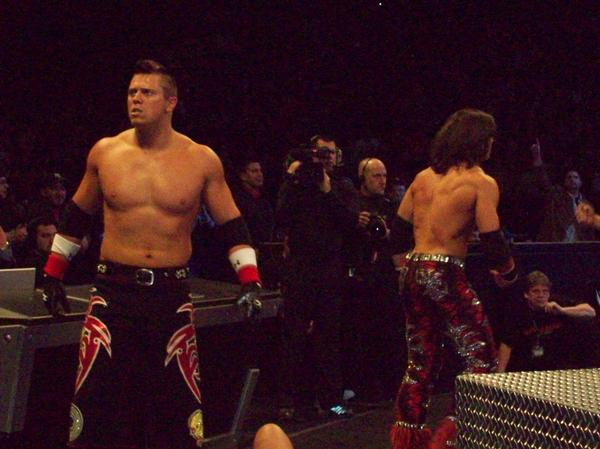
John Morrison (right) and The Miz (left)

Before they formed a partnership, John Morrison and The Miz were enemies, competing for the ECW Championship in October 2007. On the November 16, 2007, episode of SmackDown!, then-rivals Morrison and Miz were paired together to face Matt Hardy and MVP in a match for the WWE Tag Team Championship, which they subsequently won after MVP turned on Hardy. After winning the title, Morrison and Miz brought the titles to the ECW brand. Soon after winning the WWE Tag Team Championship, the two were no longer portrayed as enemies, but rather as trusting friends. They would defend the title on numerous occasions on both ECW and SmackDown! as well as multiple pay-per-views against opponents like Shannon Moore and Jimmy Wang Yang, Jesse and Festus, and Tommy Dreamer and Colin Delaney. In February 2008, Morrison and Miz were given a streaming segment on WWE.com named The Dirt Sheet in which they mocked other wrestlers and facets of pop culture. Morrison and Miz co-wrote each episode of The Dirt Sheet each week, and Morrison credits his time in college studying film with contributing to the success of the show. After being forced to wrestle vs. Miz (in a Money in the Bank qualifying match) on the March 14 episode of SmackDown in which he subsequently beat him in, Morrison competed in the Money in the Bank ladder match, which was won by CM Punk, at WrestleMania XXIV. Despite being unsuccessful, Morrison had a standout performance in the match, in which he performed a moonsault from the top rope to the outside of the ring while holding onto a ladder.

During the sixth annual WWE Draft on June 23, 2008, on Raw, the duo defeated SmackDown's the Hardys (Matt and Jeff) which earned ECW its only draft pick, which turned out to be Matt Hardy, bringing his WWE United States Championship to the brand. At The Great American Bash in July, Morrison and Miz lost the tag team titles in a four team tag match to Curt Hawkins and Zack Ryder, ending their reign at 250 days; however, neither Miz nor Morrison were pinned during the match.

After losing the titles, Morrison and Miz entered a feud with ECW newcomers Evan Bourne and Ricky Ortiz, who they had previously mocked (and continued to do so) on the Dirt Sheet. They also had an Internet-centered feud with Raw's Cryme Tyme (Shad Gaspard and JTG) based on which WWE.com online show was better: the Dirt Sheet or Cryme Tyme's Word Up. Morrison and Miz won a match between the two teams at Cyber Sunday, which was voted for by fans over a World Tag Team Championship match.

=== World Tag Team Champions (2008–2009) ===
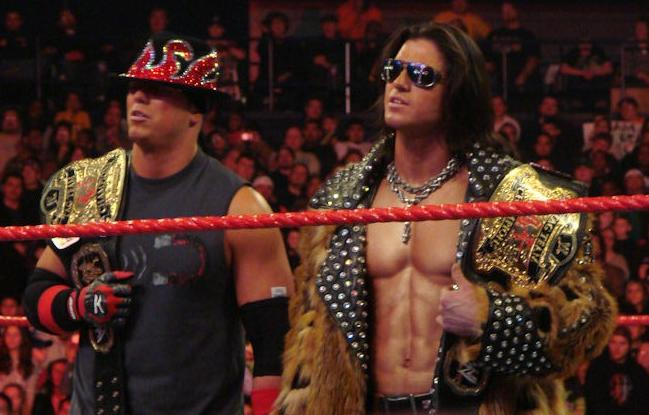
Morrison and Miz as World Tag Team Champions

Throughout October, the team mocked D-Generation X (DX) (Triple H and Shawn Michaels), using phrases such as "Are you 50?" instead of DX's usual catchphrase "Are you Ready?" to mock their ages due to DX being formed in 1997, when both Morrison and Miz were in high school. On the October 28 episode of ECW, their feud with DX continued as they mocked them after a live Dirt Sheet and then proceeded to attack two impostors playing Michaels and Triple H. On the 800th episode celebration of Raw, Morrison and Miz competed in a match against DX, and were defeated. During the match, they mocked DX's signature moves, with Morrison successfully performing a superkick (mocking Michaels' Sweet Chin Music) on Triple H as well as Miz attempting a Pedigree on Triple H. Following their feud with DX, they continued to feud with Cryme Tyme. Morrison and Miz were part of John "Bradshaw" Layfield (JBL)'s team at the annual Survivor Series but they lost to a team led by Shawn Michaels.

On the December 8 episode of Raw, Morrison and Miz won the 2008 Slammy Award for Tag Team of the Year and also for the Best WWE.com exclusive, for their show, The Dirt Sheet. On December 13, at a house show in Hamilton, Ontario, Morrison and Miz won the World Tag Team Championship for the first time, defeating Kofi Kingston and CM Punk. The duo then engaged themselves in a feud with the WWE Tag Team Champions The Colóns (Carlito and Primo). They later defended the World Tag Team Championship against The Colóns but lost in a match for The Colóns' WWE Tag Team Championship. On the pre-show of WrestleMania 25, Morrison and Miz lost the World Tag Team Championship to The Colóns in a Lumberjack match to unify the World Tag Team and the WWE Tag Team Championships.

=== Split and feud (2009–2011) ===
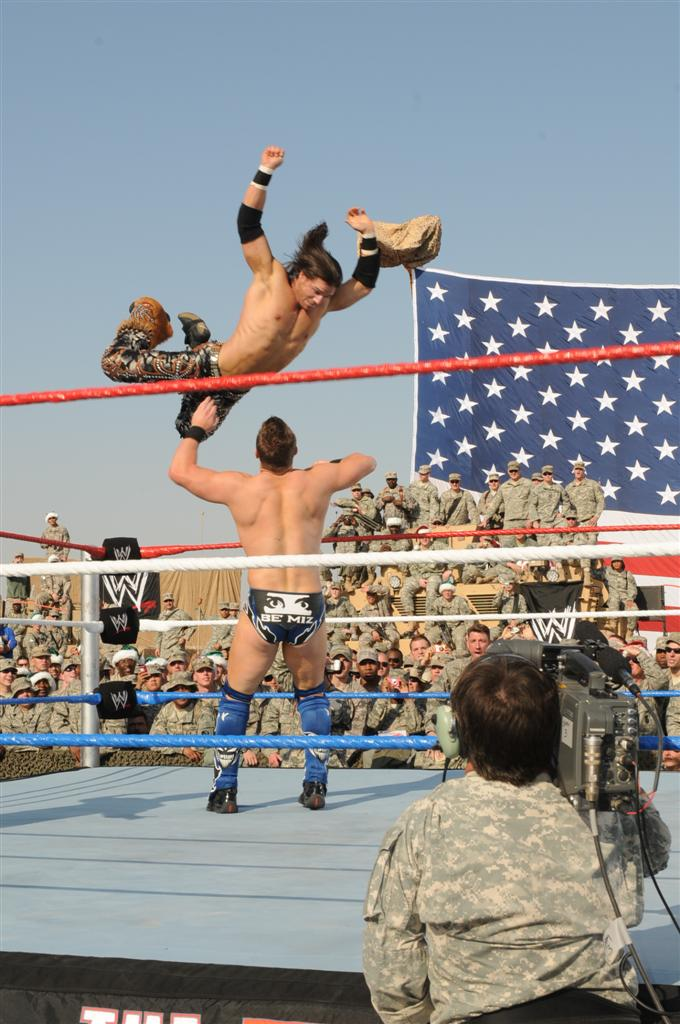
Morrison wrestling Miz in December 2009 at Tribute to the Troops

On the April 13 episode of Raw, The Miz lost a match to Raw's Kofi Kingston after John Morrison accidentally got him disqualified, which gave Raw a draft pick in the 2009 WWE draft. The pick was then revealed to be Miz, and he subsequently attacked Morrison, ending their partnership. Two days later on April 15, Morrison was drafted to the SmackDown brand as part of the 2009 Supplemental Draft.

In October 2009, WWE premiered a new pay-per-view event based around inter-brand matches. At the time, The Miz was the second-tier champion on Raw after winning the United States Championship and was subsequently booked against SmackDown's Intercontinental Champion, John Morrison. In the build up to their first match since splitting, the two hosted a one-off edition of The Dirt Sheet on the October 16 episode of SmackDown where the two compared themselves to '80s tag team The Rockers, debating over which is more comparable to the successful Shawn Michaels and which was the less successful Marty Jannetty. At Bragging Rights, Miz pinned Morrison to become the only member of the Raw roster to win an interpromotional match. The following month at Survivor Series, Miz captained a team of five wrestlers against Team Morrison in a five-on-five Survivor Series elimination match and once again bested his former partner. At the Tribute to the Troops in December, Miz rolled up Morrison for the win in a singles match. The two had another match the following March, when John Morrison and his new partner R-Truth challenged for the Unified Tag Team Championships held by The Miz and the Big Show. Morrison was finally able to defeat The Miz in a singles match, however Morrison could not pick up the victory for the titles at WrestleMania XXVI.

Leading up to that year's Bragging Rights pay-per-view, Miz and Morrison were chosen as members of Team Raw with the Miz being the team's captain. On the October 18 episode of Raw, they lost to Team SmackDown in a tag team battle royal. At Bragging Rights, they lost to Team SmackDown once again in the 14-man elimination tag team match for the Bragging Rights Trophy.

In 2011, after The Miz won the WWE Championship, he retained the title against Morrison in a Falls Count Anywhere match on the January 3, 2011, episode of Raw. At May's Extreme Rules, John Cena won the title in a triple threat steel cage match against The Miz and Morrison. At one point, Morrison nearly escaped the cage, but was attacked by R-Truth, who had turned heel on Morrison that February, ending their partnership. Later that year in November, The Miz and Morrison had another Falls Count Anywhere match, in which Miz caused Morrison a scripted injury; this was used to write Morrison off WWE television as he decided not to renew his contract.

=== Reunion (2020–2021) ===
On September 26, 2019, it was reported by Mike Johnson of Pro Wrestling Insider that Morrison had re-signed with WWE, being confirmed on December 3 on WWE Backstage. He made his return on the January 3, 2020 episode of SmackDown and was paired with The Miz. On the January 31 episode of SmackDown, the duo teamed together for the first time in nearly 11 years, defeating Heavy Machinery (Otis and Tucker), Lucha House Party (Gran Metalik and Lince Dorado), and the Revival (Dash Wilder and Scott Dawson) in a fatal four-way tag team match, thus earning an opportunity to face the New Day (Big E and Kofi Kingston) for the SmackDown Tag Team Championship at Super ShowDown, winning the titles on February 27.

On March 8, the duo had their first title defense against five other teams in the second-ever tag team Elimination Chamber match at the Elimination Chamber event, eliminating the New Day and the Usos themselves at the end of the match to retain the title. At WrestleMania 36, after The Miz's absence due to illness, Morrison defended the SmackDown Tag Team Championships by himself in a ladder match against Kofi Kingston and Jimmy Uso, in which he was successful. On the April 17 episode of SmackDown, the duo lost the titles back to the New Day after Miz unsuccessfully defended the titles by himself in a triple threat match against Big E and Jey Uso, ending their reign at 50 days. At Money in the Bank the following month, Morrison and Miz unsuccessfully attempted to regain the championship in a fatal four-way tag team match.

Both participated in a handicap match against the Universal Champion Braun Strowman at Backlash for the title, but they were defeated. Then, they started a storyline with the Money in the Bank contract holder Otis and Tucker of Heavy Machinery, culminating with a match at Hell in a Cell where Miz won the briefcase.

Miz cashed in his Money in the Bank contract at the TLC: Tables, Ladders & Chairs event during a TLC match between Drew McIntyre and AJ Styles, but was unsuccessful as McIntyre retained his title. On the December 28 episode of Raw, Miz had the contract returned to him as the cash-in at TLC was ruled invalid due to Morrison cashing in the contract on his behalf (as only the contract holder himself can cash it in). At Elimination Chamber, Miz would successfully cash in on McIntyre and win the WWE Championship for the second time in his career but lost it eight days later against Bobby Lashley. Miz and Morrison started a feud against Bad Bunny and Damian Priest at the end of January which led them to a match at WrestleMania 37, in a tag team match, in which they lost.

On the August 23, 2021 episode of Raw, The Miz was defeated by Xavier Woods after an unintentional distraction from Morrison. After the match, Miz attacked Morrison, disbanding the team and setting up a feud between the pair. However, the feud would abruptly end after The Miz took time off to compete on the Dancing with the Stars. On November 18, as part of budget cuts stemming from the COVID-19 pandemic, Morrison was released from his WWE contract before The Miz would return to WWE programming.

== Championships and accomplishments ==
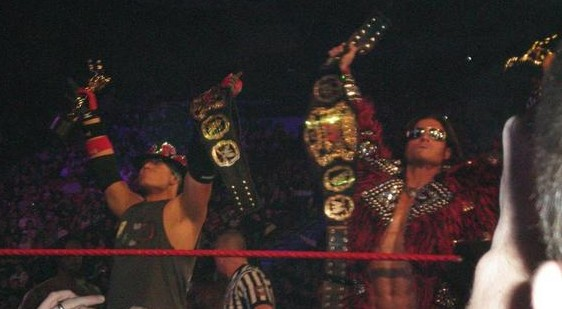
Miz (left) and Morrison (right) with the World Tag Team Championship and Slammy Awards

- The Baltimore Sun
  - Most Improved Wrestler of the Year (2009) – The Miz
  - Tag Team of the Year (2008)
- Pro Wrestling Illustrated
  - Most Improved Wrestler of the Year (2009) – Morrison
  - Ranked Morrison No. 43 of the top 500 singles wrestlers in the PWI 500 in 2008
  - Ranked The Miz No. 54 of the top 500 singles wrestlers in the PWI 500 in 2008
  - Ranked No. 27 of the top 50 tag teams in the PWI Tag Team 50 in 2020
- World Wrestling Entertainment/WWE
  - WWE Championship (1 time) – The Miz
  - World Tag Team Championship (1 time)
  - WWE Tag Team Championship (1 time)
  - WWE SmackDown Tag Team Championship (1 time)
  - Slammy Award (2 times)
    - Best WWE.com Exclusive (2008)
    - Tag Team of the Year (2008)
- Wrestling Observer Newsletter
  - Most Improved (2008, 2009) – The Miz
  - Tag Team of the Year (2008)
