= 2300 Arena =

Multipurpose indoor arena in Philadelphia, Pennsylvania

- ECW Arena
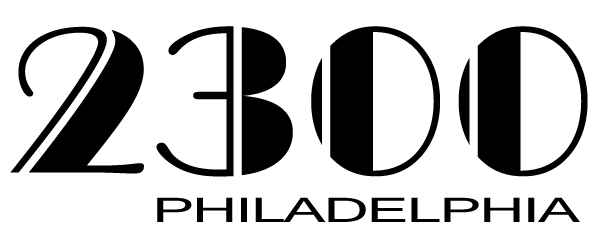

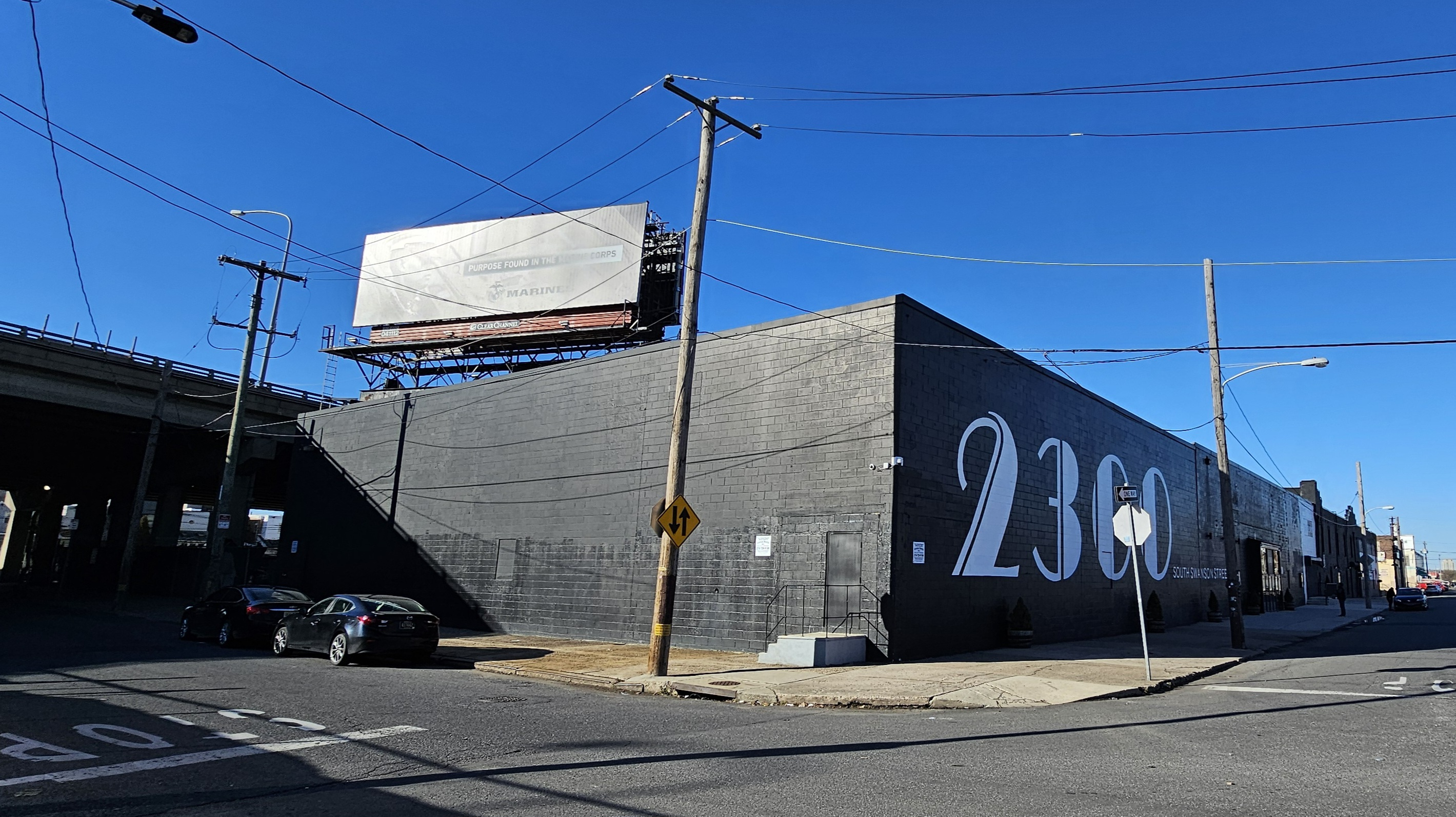
- 2300 Arena in 2024
- Interactive map of 2300 Arena
- Former names: Viking Hall (1986–2002); XPW Arena (2002–2003); New Alhambra Sports & Entertainment Center (2004–2006); New Alhambra Arena (2006–2009); The Arena (2009–2010); Asylum Arena (2010–2012)
- Address: 2300 South Swanson Street
- Location: Philadelphia, Pennsylvania, U.S.
- Coordinates: 39°55′3.51″N 75°8′50.01″W
- Owner: Stein & Silverman Family Partnership, Inc.
- Operator: Roger Artigiani
- Capacity: 1,300
- Record attendance: 1,850 (January 15, 2000)
- Field size: 58,408 square feet (5,426.3 m^{2})
- Public transit: SEPTA bus: 7, 57, 63, 76, 79

Construction
- Built: 1920
- Opened: May 14, 1993; 33 years ago (as sports venue)
- Renovated: 2004–2005, 2013–2014

Tenants
- South Philly Vikings, 1986–2002; Extreme Championship Wrestling, 1993–2001; Xtreme Pro Wrestling, 2002–2003; Peltz Boxing Promotions, 2004–2009; Joe Hand Promotions, 2004–2009; Arena Operating LLC, 2012–2013

Website
- 2300arena.com

2300 Arena is a multipurpose indoor arena in Philadelphia, Pennsylvania, used primarily for professional wrestling, boxing, mixed martial arts, and concert events. Originally known as Viking Hall, the venue has since been named XPW Arena, New Alhambra Sports & Entertainment Center, New Alhambra Arena, The Arena and Asylum Arena. It was known unofficially as the ECW Arena when it was home to Extreme Championship Wrestling (ECW) from 1993 to 2001 and as the CZW Arena and 3PW Arena when it was home to Combat Zone Wrestling (CZW) and Pro-Pain Pro Wrestling (3PW), respectively, during the early 2000s.

The venue has hosted professional wrestling broadcasts including the first ECW pay-per-view Barely Legal, the first Dragon Gate USA pay-per-view Enter the Dragon, and the WWE television special NXT 2300. It has hosted professional boxing broadcasts including Friday Night Fights and Wednesday Night Fights, for which it was named ESPN2's 2006 Venue of the Year.

Recognized as the birthplace of American hardcore wrestling, the venue has been home to the Hardcore Hall of Fame since 2002.

== History ==
=== 1920–1985: Freight house ===
The South Philadelphia venue was originally constructed in 1920 as a 58,408 square feet (5,426.3 m^{2}) freight house. Railway tracks next to the building allowed freight trains to drop off cargo for storage and then continue on to their destinations. The tracks were eventually paved over to become an extension of West Ritner Street, allowing West Ritner Street to intersect with South Swanson Street. An elevated stretch of Interstate 95 was later erected above the venue.

=== 1986–2002: South Philly Vikings management ===
Elias Stein and Leon Silverman of the law firm Stein & Silverman Family Partnership, Inc. purchased the freight house in 1986. The southern part of the facility was given the name Viking Hall when the South Philly Vikings, a local chapter of mummers, began utilizing it. They used the building to rehearse for the annual Mummers Parade, assembling and storing their floats within the facility. The South Philly Vikings also staged midnight bingo games at the venue to raise funds for their organization. Carmen "Butch" D'Amato of the South Philly Vikings served as the facility's general manager. The northern part of the building was occupied by retail space, most notably a dollar store and Forman Mills.

==== Extreme Championship Wrestling residency, 1993–2001 ====
The venue's original entrance at the corner of South Swanson Street and West Ritner Street on July 11, 2009

The southern part of the building gained worldwide recognition when it served as ECW Arena, home of professional wrestling promotion Extreme Championship Wrestling from May 1993 until the promotion's closure in April 2001. The promotion was charged $1,000 per month by Stein & Silverman Family Partnership, Inc. to rent the venue, and was also responsible for any damage caused by its performers.

With the venue's size and intimacy reminiscent of Japan's Korakuen Hall, its vocal live crowds became synonymous with Extreme Championship Wrestling's presentation of hardcore wrestling. Attendance frequently exceeded the venue's legal seating capacity of 1,060. Fans Bring the Weapons matches encouraged audience members to purchase items from the adjacent dollar store for wrestlers to strike each other with. The promotion was sued after a fire stunt in October 1995 burned a member of the crowd. Frank Talent of the Pennsylvania State Athletic Commission was seen as an ally of the promotion, regularly turning a blind eye when regulations were violated.

Smart wrestling fans traveled from all over the world to experience the venue's atmosphere. Extreme Championship Wrestling founded their annual CyberSlam fan convention and supercard at the venue in February 1996. Future All Elite Wrestling founder Tony Khan attended The Doctor Is In as a teenager in August 1996, a show that featured his future star Chris Jericho. The Elvis Depressedly album New Alhambra was named after the venue, with frontman Mathew Lee Cothran deriving inspiration from a bloody Rob Van Dam match he witnessed from the crowd.

Extreme Championship Wrestling moved away from the supercard model, broadcasting its first pay-per-view event called Barely Legal from the venue in April 1997. The promotion never ran another live broadcast from the venue, as their pay-per-view provider Request TV wanted the company to run events in larger cities.

=== 2002–2003: Xtreme Pro Wrestling management ===
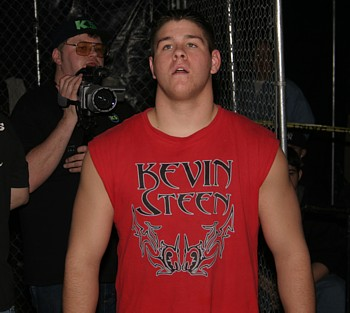
Kevin Steen entering the venue for his match at CZW Cage of Death VI on December 11, 2004

Following the closure of Extreme Championship Wrestling in April 2001, Combat Zone Wrestling and Pro-Pain Pro Wrestling began running regular shows at the venue. Ring of Honor opted to run their shows at nearby Murphy Recreation Center, citing the need to establish their own legacy separate from ECW.

Controversy arose when Xtreme Pro Wrestling signed an exclusive lease with the venue in December 2002 and renamed the building XPW Arena, preventing other promotions from utilizing it. Kirk Farrington, who had worked for Xtreme Pro Wrestling in California, was named the venue's general manager. Forced to relocate, Combat Zone Wrestling moved their shows to CZW Arena in Southwest Philadelphia, Pro-Pain Pro Wrestling moved their shows to Electric Factory in Callowhill, and the South Philly Vikings established a new Viking Hall in East Passyunk Crossing.

In January 2003, the Pennsylvania State Athletic Commission banned barbed wire and light tubes from professional wrestling matches in response to violent Xtreme Pro Wrestling and Combat Zone Wrestling events at the venue.

The building's ownership evicted Xtreme Pro Wrestling from the venue in February 2003 after the promotion failed to make lease payments. Combat Zone Wrestling resumed running shows at the venue in March 2003, with Pro-Pain Pro Wrestling returning in November 2003.

=== 2004–2012: Roger Artigiani management ===
==== Peltz and Hand residency, 2004–2009 ====
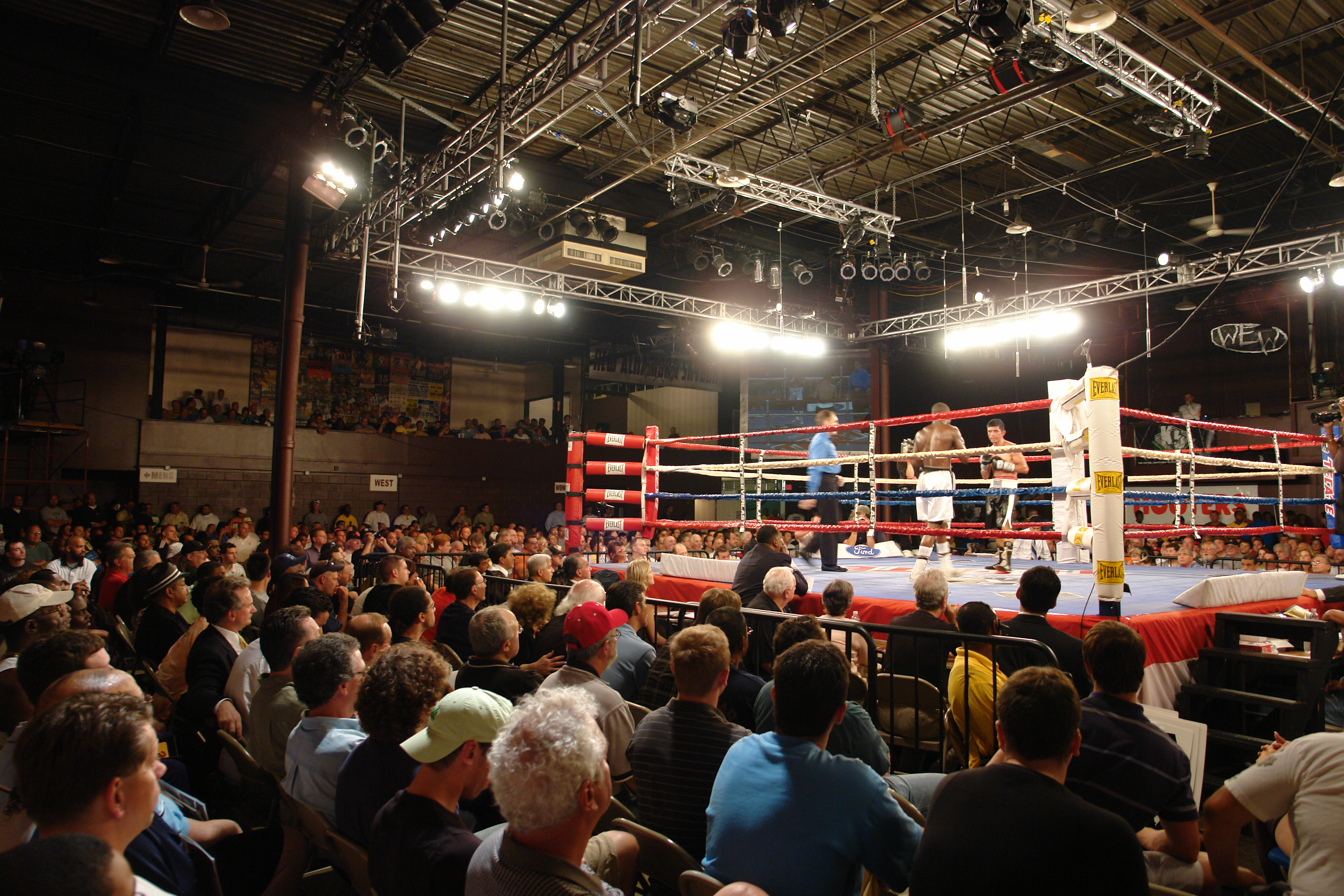
The venue's renovated interior during the Mtagwa–Valtierra boxing card on July 20, 2007

Roger Artigiani became the venue's general manager in 2004. That same year, the building's name was officially changed to New Alhambra Sports & Entertainment Center, which was later shortened to New Alhambra Arena in 2006. The name was suggested by J. Russell Peltz, who began co-promoting professional boxing cards at the venue with Joe Hand, Sr. in May 2004. It paid homage to the original Alhambra Movie Theater in South Philadelphia that hosted boxing in the 1950s and 1960s.

Renovations were undertaken at a cost of $500,000 to improve the building's infrastructure and increase its suitability for boxing. A 16-foot boxing ring was installed at the insistence of J. Russell Peltz, who believed that the small dimensions would force boxers to engage with each other and make bouts more exciting. The venue's bleachers were removed and replaced with folding chairs and skyboxes. Land was acquired for a 500-space parking lot that was built across from the venue under Interstate 95.

J. Russell Peltz and Joe Hand, Sr. announced in January 2009 that after a five-year partnership, they would stop promoting boxing cards at the venue and move their shows to The Blue Horizon. Although their claimed reason for leaving was a rent increase from $1,000 per month to $6,000 per month, the new rental fee was in actuality $2,500. The venue was then renamed to The Arena by general manager Roger Artigiani.

==== Asylum Fight League naming rights, 2010–2012 ====
After The Blue Horizon closed in June 2010, J. Russell Peltz and Joe Hand, Sr. returned to once again promote boxing cards at the venue.

Roger Artigiani announced in October 2010 that mixed martial arts group Asylum Fight League had purchased the naming rights to the venue and renamed it Asylum Arena.

=== 2012–2013: Arena Operating LLC management ===
Joanna Pang of the Trocadero Theatre (dba Arena Operating LLC) signed an exclusive lease with the venue in February 2012 with plans to renovate and convert it to a concert hall. Forced to relocate, Chikara moved their shows to Trocadero Theatre in Chinatown, while Combat Zone Wrestling moved their shows to Flyers Skate Zone in Voorhees Township, New Jersey.

Arena Operating LLC was evicted by the building's ownership in April 2013 after Joanna Pang failed to complete her proposed renovations. Pang started the project but never completed it, leaving the venue stripped down to its bare walls.

=== 2013–present: Roger Artigiani management ===
The venue reopened as 2300 Arena in May 2014, hosting a Peltz Boxing Promotions card for its soft launch. The name referenced a newly constructed entranceway at 2300 South Swanson Street, replacing the original entrance at 7 West Ritner Street.

Renovations were performed that saw a bar constructed in the lobby, with overall seating capacity rising to 1,300. The venue was modernized to accommodate conventions and other large events such as banquets and fashion shows.

Christy Bottie, an accomplished artist with Mural Arts Philadelphia and Roger Artigiani's business partner, was responsible for designing the renovated venue.

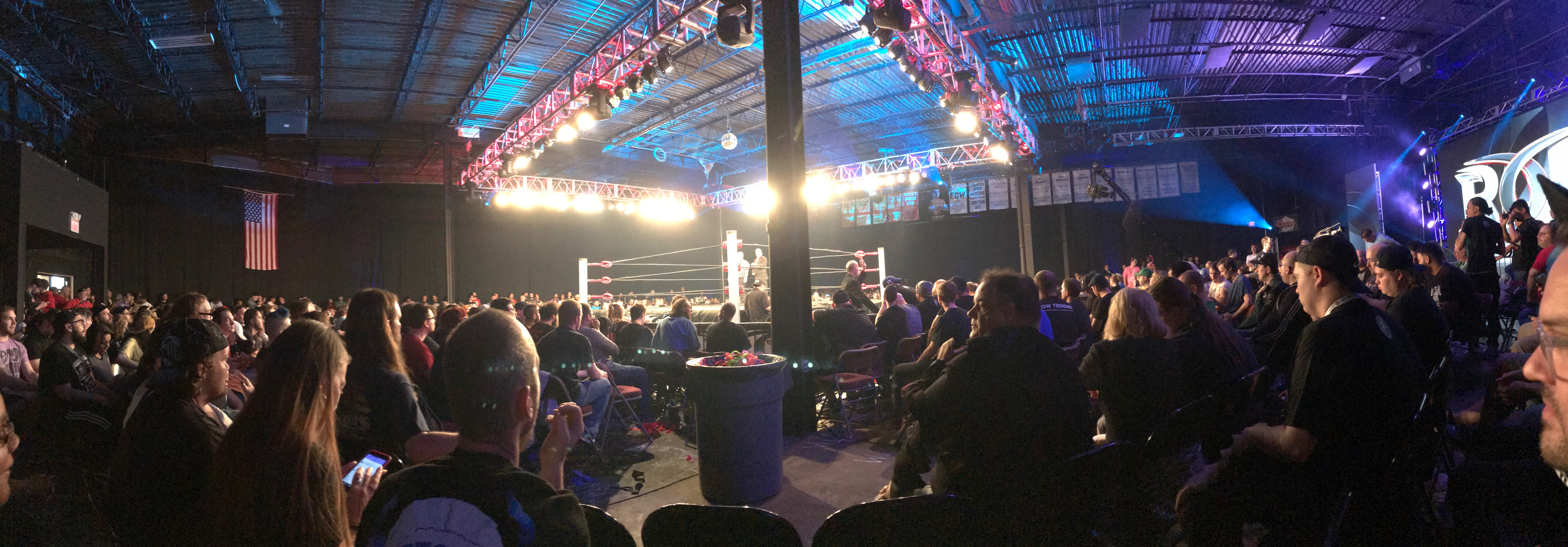
The venue's renovated interior during ROH/NJPW War of the Worlds – May 14, 2017

== Notable events ==
=== Professional wrestling ===
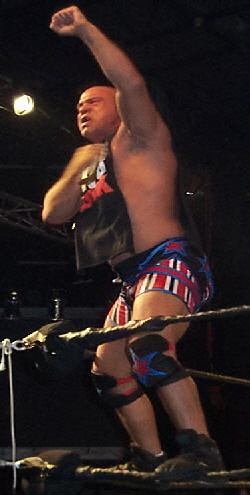
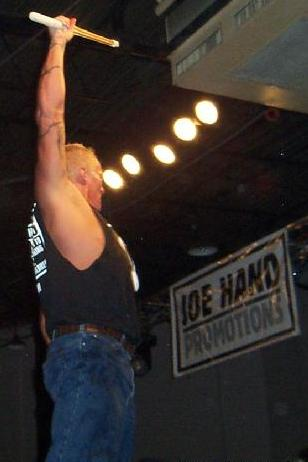
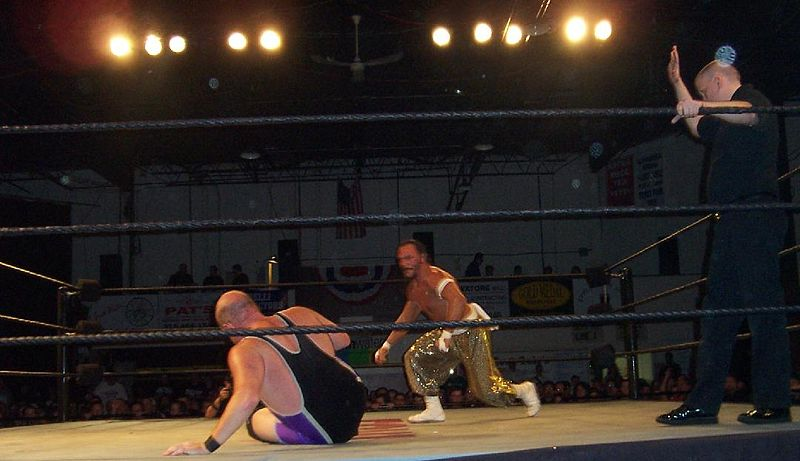
ECW at the venue on June 24, 2006. Clockwise from upper left: Kurt Angle, The Sandman, C. W. Anderson wrestling Sabu.

An NWA World Title Tournament at the venue on August 27, 1994 ended with Shane Douglas defeating 2 Cold Scorpio in the finals to capture the vacant NWA World Heavyweight Championship. Douglas then threw down the NWA belt and declared himself ECW World Heavyweight Champion, effectively launching Extreme Championship Wrestling as a national promotion.

Extreme Championship Wrestling broadcast Barely Legal, their first live pay-per-view event from the venue on April 13, 1997. The event was headlined by Terry Funk defeating Raven to become ECW World Heavyweight Champion. Filmmaker Barry W. Blaustein included behind-the-scenes footage of this event in his documentary Beyond the Mat.

On June 10, 2005, an unauthorized Extreme Championship Wrestling reunion show called Hardcore Homecoming: An Extreme Reunion set a record gate for the venue with $135,000 in ticket sales. The Pennsylvania State Athletic Commission lifted their January 2003 ban on barbed wire for the main event Three-Way Dance between Sabu, Shane Douglas and Terry Funk.

The ECW brand of WWE ran a house show at the venue on June 24, 2006, with tickets for the event selling out in under four minutes. Rob Van Dam successfully defended his WWE Championship in the main event against Kurt Angle.

New Jack was banned from the venue following an incident during a Pro Wrestling Xplosion show on September 13, 2006 . He famously ordered Sprite at the venue's concession stand and was instead given 7 Up, prompting him to verbally harass the stand attendant and assault a member of the ring crew. This ban was later rescinded in 2012.

Scenes from The Wrestler were shot at the venue during the Combat Zone Wrestling show 9 F'N Years on February 9, 2008, with professional wrestler Necro Butcher having a prominent on-screen role in the film.

A Ring of Honor card on February 28, 2009 was filmed for broadcast as the debut episodes of Ring of Honor Wrestling on HDNet. The event was headlined by Bryan Danielson defeating Austin Aries.

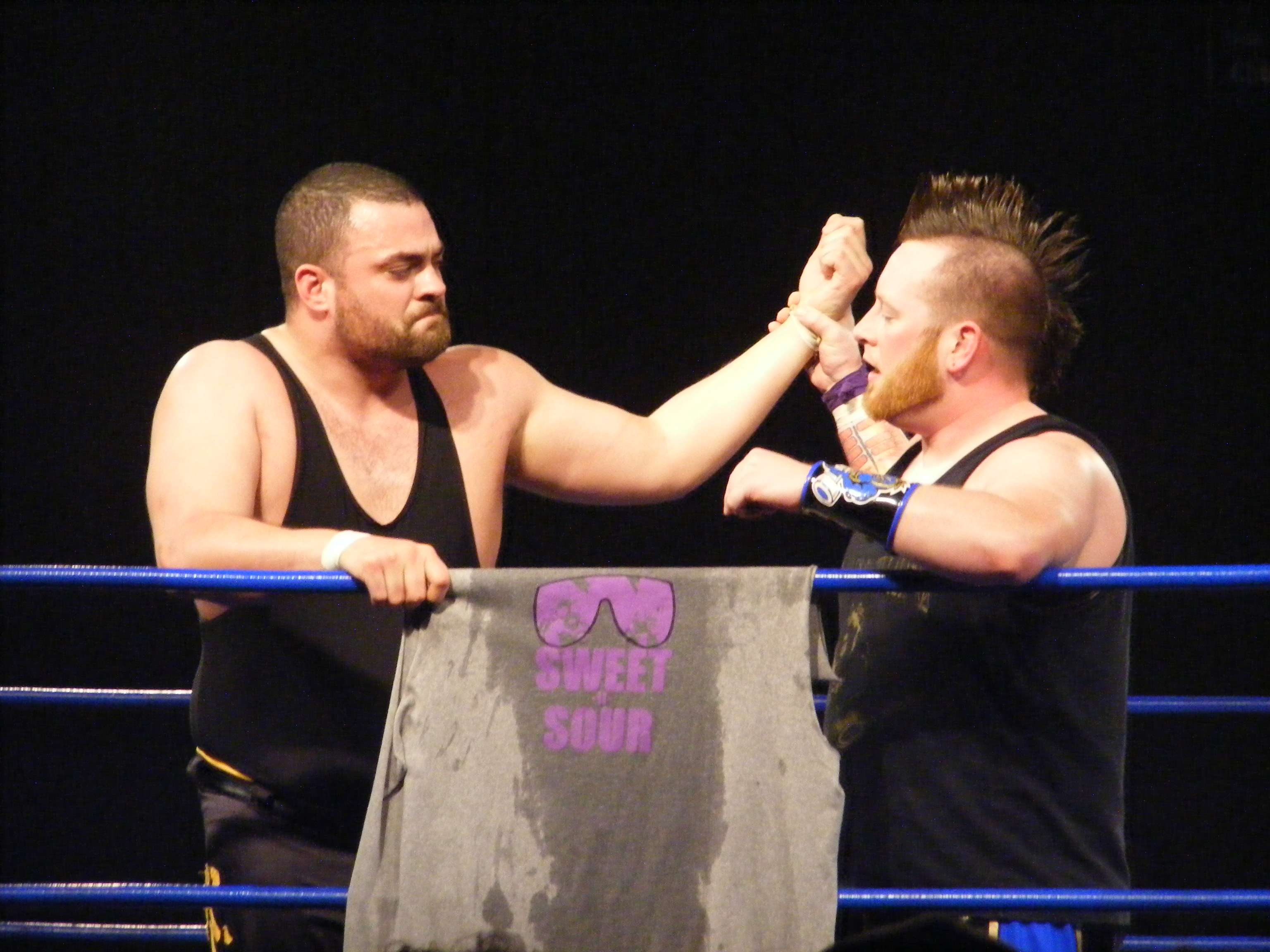
Eddie Kingston (left) and Arik Cannon paying tribute to Larry Sweeney following their Chikara King of Trios match on April 16, 2011

Dragon Gate USA filmed their first pay-per-view event, Enter the Dragon at the venue on July 25, 2009. The card was headlined by Open the Dream Gate Champion Naruki Doi defeating Shingo Takagi in a non-title match. It was voted Best Major Show of 2009 by the readers of Wrestling Observer Newsletter.

In September 2009, independent wrestler Matt Riot died following a Pro Wrestling Academy training session at the venue where he collapsed from a brain hemorrhage.

Freedom Fight was filmed by Dragon Gate USA at the venue on November 28, 2009 for pay-per-view broadcast. The event was headlined by BxB Hulk defeating CIMA, Gran Akuma and YAMATO in an elimination match to become inaugural Open the Freedom Gate Champion.

Dragon Gate USA filmed their second-annual Enter the Dragon event at the venue for pay-per-view on July 24, 2010. The card was headlined by Bryan Danielson defeating Shingo Takagi in a dark match.

Chikara held a memorial service for Larry Sweeney at the venue prior to the first night of their King of Trios event on April 15, 2011. The finals of the 12 Large: Summit, a tournament named in Sweeney's honor, were held at the venue during High Noon on November 13, 2011. Eddie Kingston defeated Mike Quackenbush to win the tournament and become inaugural Chikara Grand Champion.

The venue hosted the premiere of the unauthorized Extreme Championship Wrestling documentary Barbed Wire City on April 20, 2013. Wrestlers including Don E. Allen, Sal E. Graziano, Shane Douglas and The Blue Meanie were present for the event.

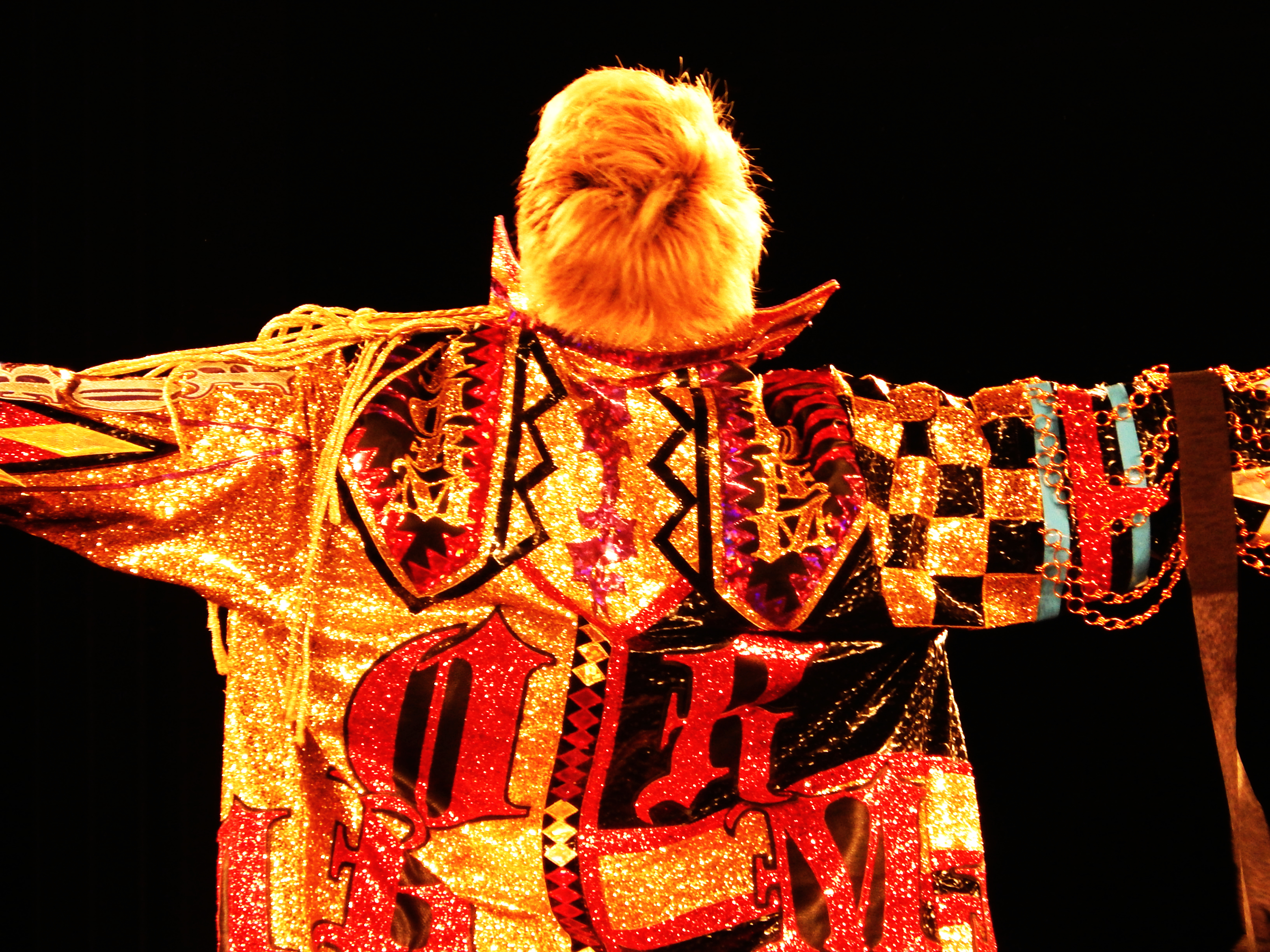
Kazuchika Okada posing at the venue during ROH/NJPW War of the Worlds on May 13, 2015

Ring of Honor and New Japan Pro-Wrestling jointly presented War of the Worlds '15 at the venue over two consecutive nights on May 12, 2015 and May 13, 2015. Originally scheduled as a one-night event, a second night was added after tickets for the original date sold out immediately. The first night was headlined by Kazuchika Okada and Shinsuke Nakamura defeating The Briscoes, and the second night was headlined by Adam Cole, Matt Taven and Michael Bennett defeating A.J. Styles and The Young Bucks.

Ring of Honor broadcast Final Battle 2015 on live pay-per-view from the venue on December 18, 2015, an event headlined by Jay Lethal retaining his ROH World Championship against AJ Styles.

Major League Wrestling presented their inaugural SuperFight card from the venue on February 2, 2019. The event aired live on beIN Sports and was headlined by Tom Lawlor defeating Low Ki to become MLW World Heavyweight Champion.

Evolve 131 aired live on WWE Network from the venue on July 13, 2019. Adam Cole successfully retained his NXT Championship in the main event against Akira Tozawa.

The VICE series Dark Side of the Ring: Confidential was filmed at the venue in December 2020.

Ring of Honor broadcast Death Before Dishonor XVIII on live pay-per-view from the venue on September 12, 2021, an event headlined by Bandido retaining his ROH World Championship against Brody King, Demonic Flamita and EC3 in an elimination match.

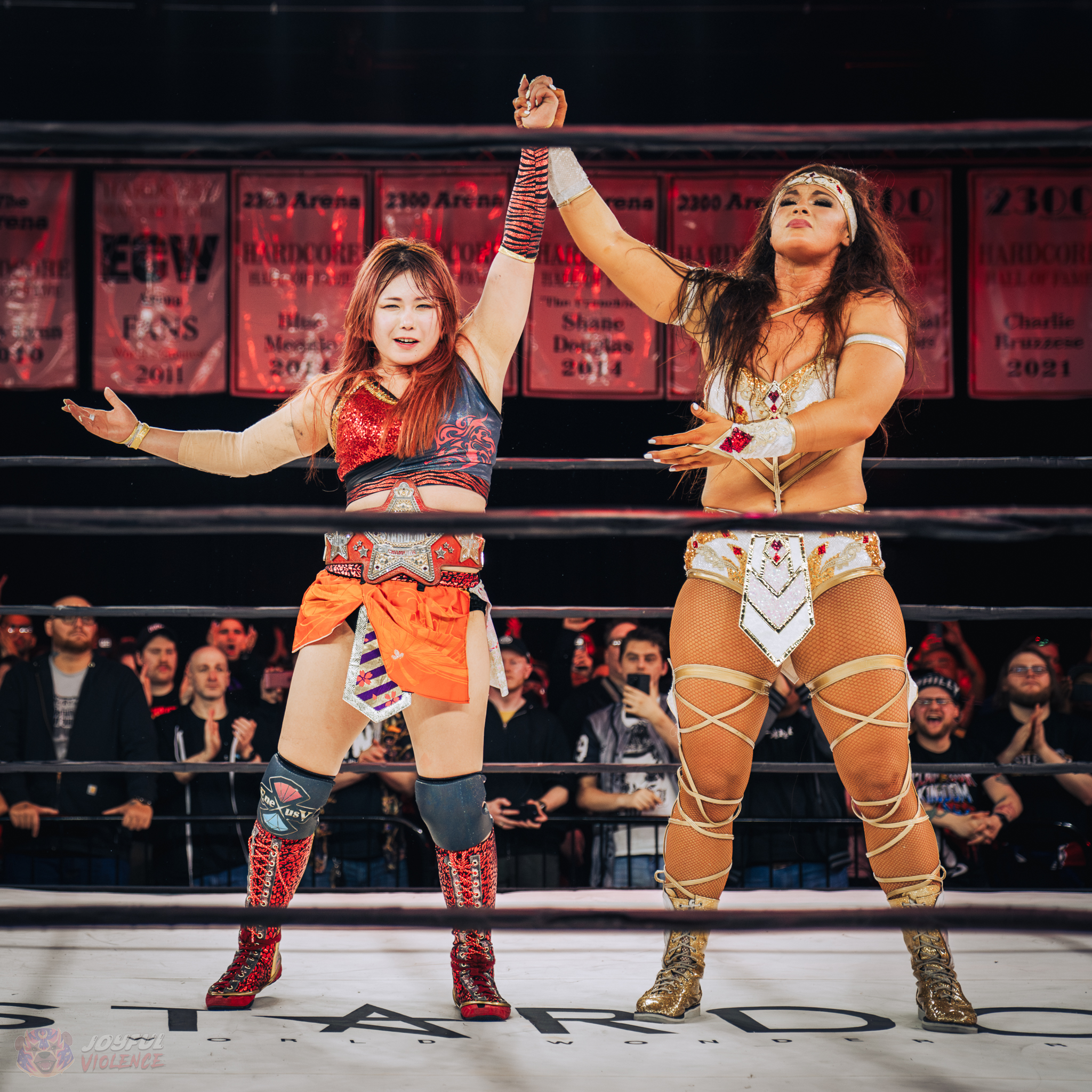
Megan Bayne (right) raising the arm of Maika at the venue following their Stardom American Dream match on April 4, 2024

The venue hosted the inaugural Women's Wrestling Hall of Fame induction ceremony on December 17, 2022. Jazz and Madusa were both on hand to receive their awards, with Gangrel accepting Luna Vachon's posthumous induction on her behalf.

New Japan Pro-Wrestling broadcast All Star Junior Festival USA 2023 on live pay-per-view from the venue on August 19, 2023. It was headlined by Mike Bailey defeating Kevin Knight to win the inaugural All Star Jr. Festival USA tournament.

Impact Wrestling and New Japan Pro-Wrestling jointly presented Multiverse United 2 on live pay-per-view from the venue on August 20, 2023. Alex Shelley defeated Hiroshi Tanahashi in the main event to retain his Impact World Championship.

World Wonder Ring Stardom broadcast Stardom American Dream 2024 on live pay-per-view from the venue on April 4, 2024. Maika defeated Megan Bayne in the main event to retain her World of Stardom Championship.

The venue hosted the NWA 76th Anniversary Show on August 31, 2024. It was headlined by Thom Latimer defeating Ethan Carter III to become NWA World's Heavyweight Champion.

WWE broadcast NXT 2300 live on The CW from the venue on November 6, 2024. The event was headlined by a 10-woman tag team match that saw Giulia, Jordynne Grace, Kelani Jordan, Stephanie Vaquer, and Zaria defeat Fatal Influence (Fallon Henley, Jacy Jayne, and Jazmyn Nyx), Cora Jade, and Roxanne Perez.

All Elite Wrestling staged a multi-week residency at the venue from August 27, 2025 to September 11, 2025. The residency included live broadcasts of AEW Dynamite, AEW Collision, and Ring of Honor's Death Before Dishonor XXII.

=== Professional boxing ===
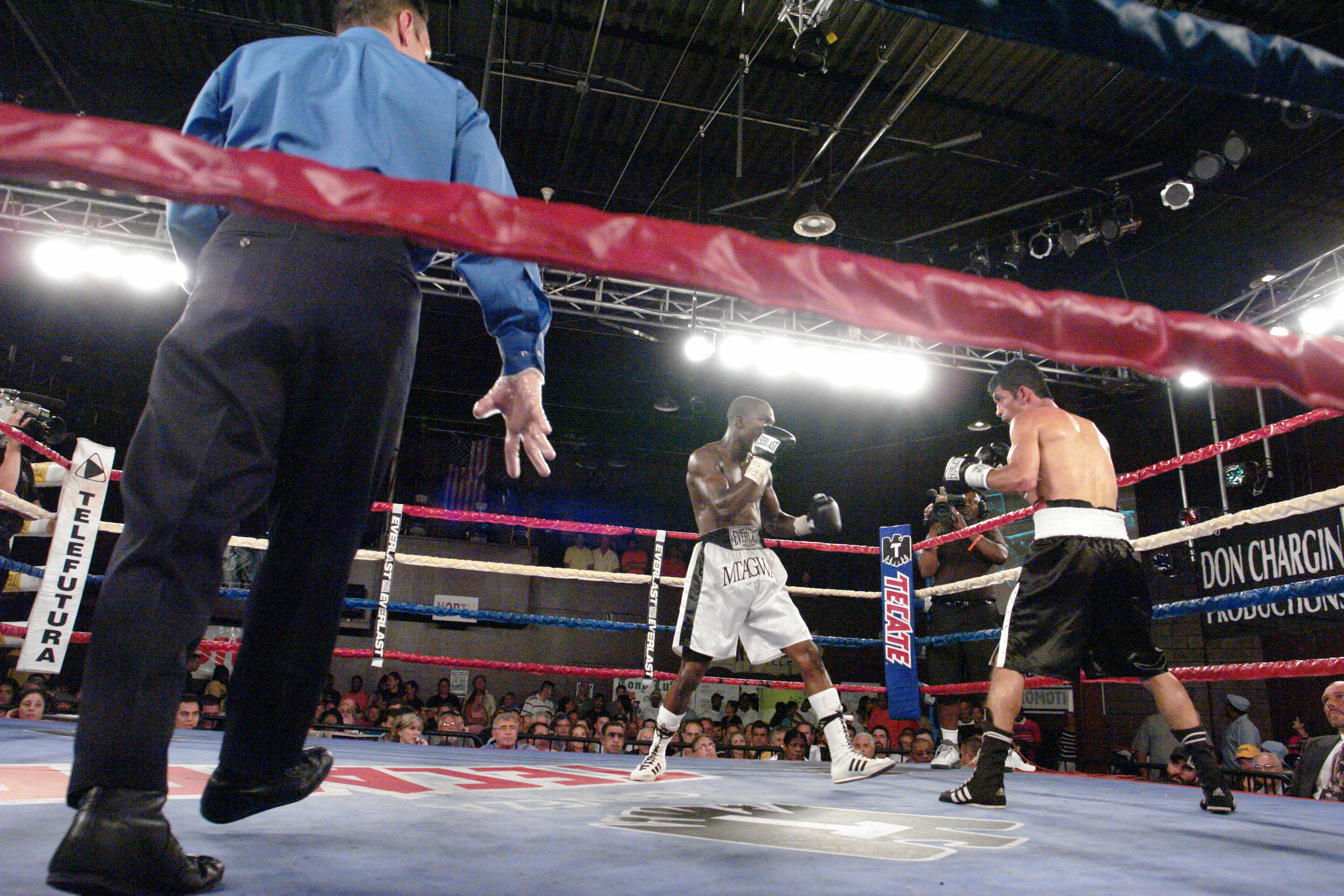
Rogers Mtagwa (left) boxing Aldo Valtierra at the venue on July 20, 2007

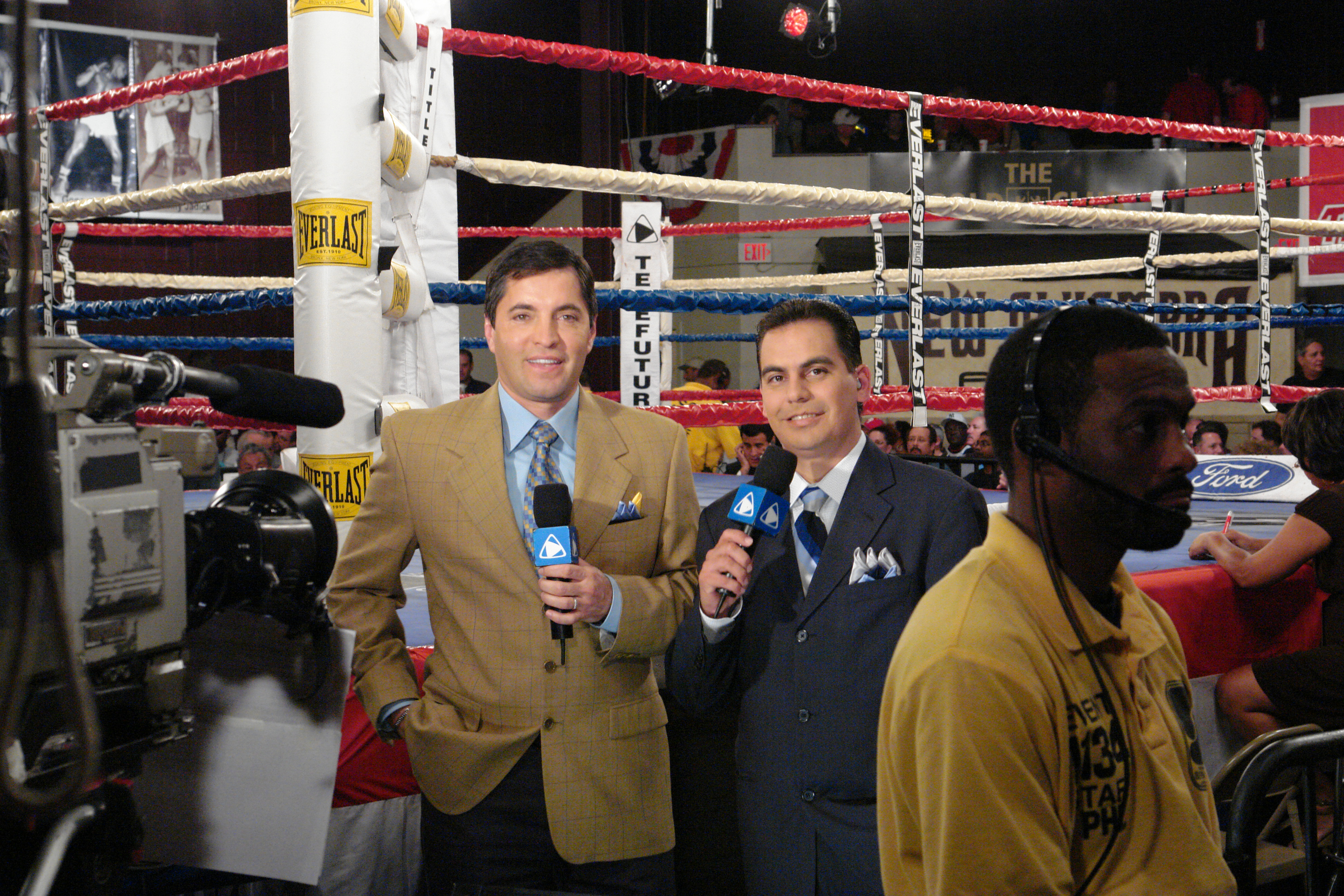
Ricardo Celis (left) and Bernardo Osuna broadcasting the Mtagwa–Valtierra card for Solo boxeo

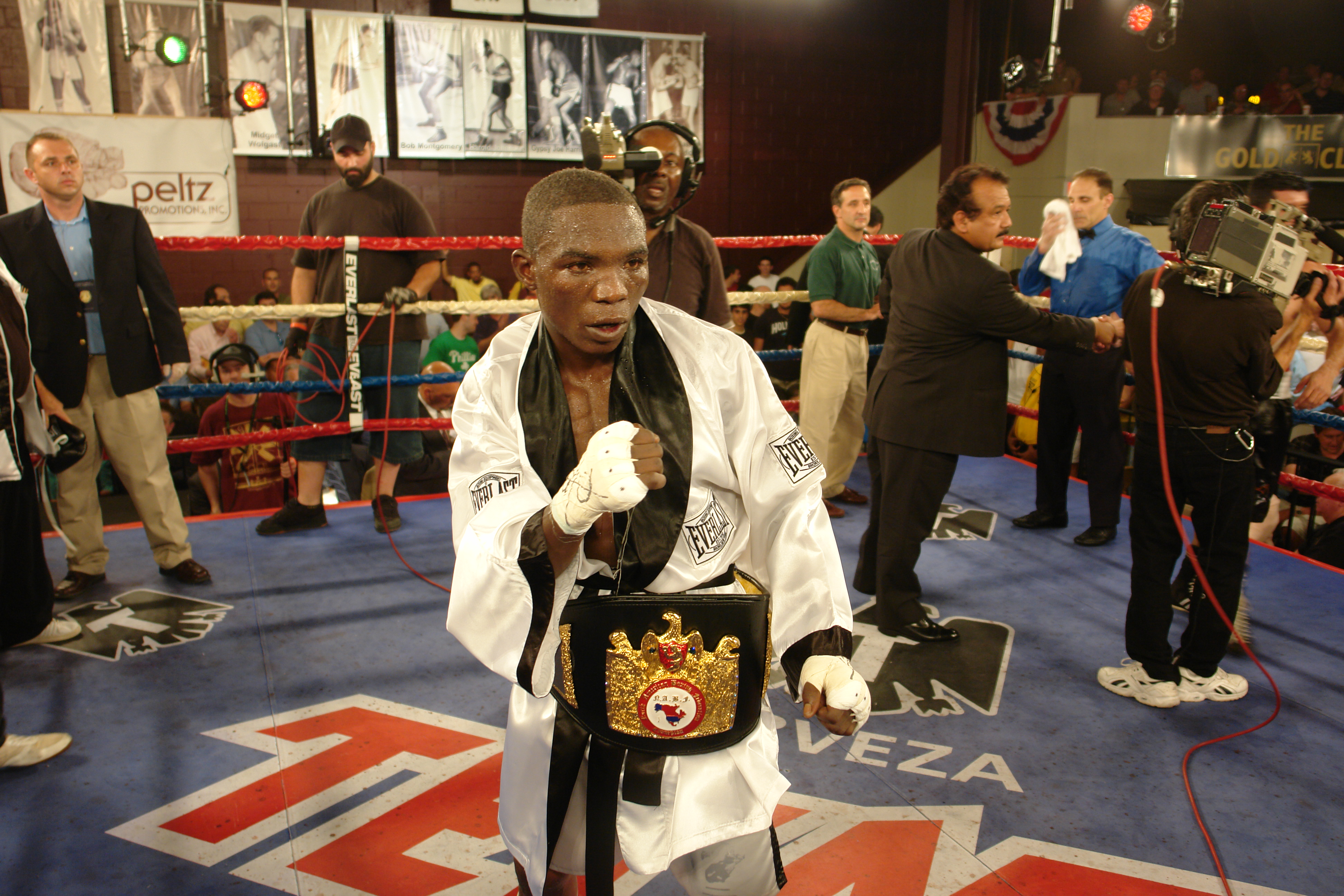
Rogers Mtagwa posing with his NABF Featherweight title

Scenes from Rocky Balboa were shot at the venue in January 2006.

ESPN2 Friday Night Fights broadcast a Golden Boy Promotions card from the venue on March 3, 2006 that saw Demetrius Hopkins defeat Mario Ramos by unanimous decision to capture the vacant USBA Junior Welterweight championship. ESPN2 Wednesday Night Fights then broadcast a Peltz Boxing Promotions card from the venue on August 2, 2006 where Rogers Mtagwa retained his USBA Featherweight championship by knockout over Alvin Brown. Following these broadcasts, ESPN2 commentator Joe Tessitore named it their 2006 Venue of the Year.

Rogers Mtagwa defeated Aldo Valtierra by split decision at the venue on July 20, 2007 to win the vacant NABF Featherweight championship. The Don Chargin Productions card was broadcast live by Solo boxeo on TeleFutura.

Bronco McKart defeated Enrique Ornelas by split decision at the venue on August 10, 2007 to capture the vacant NABF Middleweight championship. The Golden Boy Promotions card was broadcast live by Solo boxeo on TeleFutura.

ESPN2 Friday Night Fights broadcast a Shalyte Entertainment card from the venue on July 10, 2009 that saw Matt Godfrey defeat Shawn Hawk by unanimous decision to retain his NABF Cruiserweight championship.

A Main Events card on January 21, 2012 aired live from the venue as the debut episode of Fight Night on NBC Sports Network. Bryant Jennings defeated Maurice Byarm in the headlining slot by unanimous decision to capture the vacant Pennsylvania Heavyweight championship. This bout received the Briscoe Award for 2012 Philly Fight of the Year.

ESPN2 Friday Night Fights broadcast a Peltz Boxing Promotions card from the venue on May 8, 2015 that saw Amir Mansour defeat Joey Dawejko by unanimous decision to capture the vacant Pennsylvania Heavyweight championship. This bout received the Briscoe Award for 2015 Philly Fight of the Year.

Vyacheslav Shabranskyy defeated Paul Parker by technical knockout at the venue on June 30, 2015 during a Golden Boy Live! event that aired on Fox Sports 2.

ESPN broadcast a live Premier Boxing Champions card from the venue on August 5, 2016 that saw David Benavidez defeat Denis Douglin by technical knockout.

Top Rank Boxing aired live from the venue on March 30, 2019, with the ESPN broadcast featuring Oleksandr Gvozdyk defeating Doudou Ngumbu by technical knockout to retain his WBC Light Heavyweight championship.

=== Cultural ===
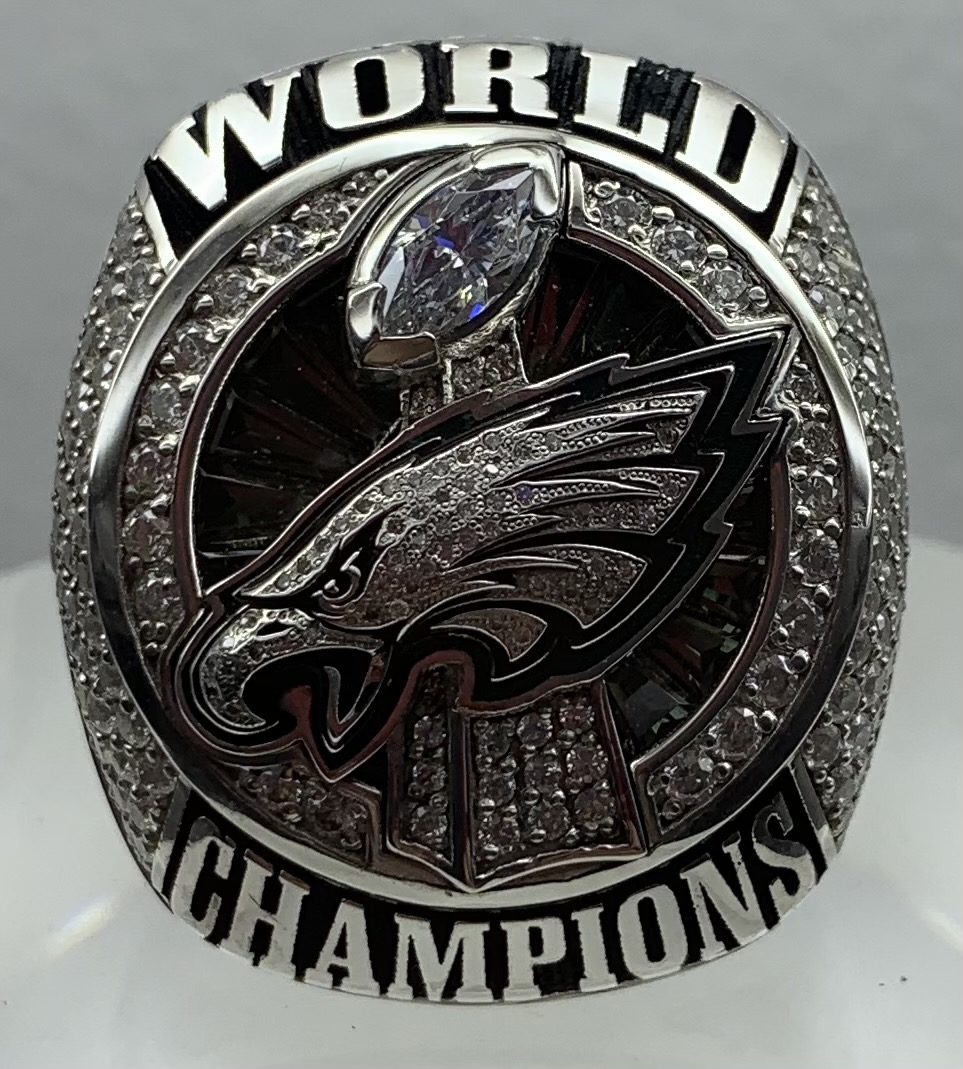
Super Bowl ring of the Philadelphia Eagles, which was unveiled at the venue on June 14, 2018

The Republican National Committee used the venue for its RNC at the DNC event in July 2016 to counter the Democratic National Convention at Wells Fargo Center.

Subaru of America held their annual convention at the venue on April 17, 2018.

Following their victory at Super Bowl LII, the Philadelphia Eagles received their Super Bowl rings during a private ceremony at the venue on June 14, 2018. Meek Mill and Rick Ross performed at the ceremony.

The Silverback Open Championships were held at the venue in October 2018, with over 850 breakdancers competing during the two-day event.

Pig Iron Theatre Company and Mimi Lien staged the premiere of their avant-garde work Superterranean at the venue over several nights in September 2019.

Mural Arts Philadelphia held their annual Wall Ball at the venue on April 27, 2023. The event featured a Def Poetry Jam reunion performance to honor Sonia Sanchez.

The national tour of The Last Match: A Pro-Wrestling Rock Experience staged a performance at the venue on May 11, 2024. The show was directed by Jeremiah James and starred Afa Anoa'i Jr., Bull James, Matthew Rehwoldt and Mickie James.

Republican vice presidential candidate JD Vance appeared at the venue on August 6, 2024 to counter Democratic presidential candidate Kamala Harris appearing at Liacouras Center to announce her running mate for the 2024 United States presidential election.

Independent Women's Voice staged their Stand with Women: Equality Isn't a Game event at the venue on October 27, 2024. It featured conservative speakers including Riley Gaines and Tulsi Gabbard.

== Records ==
This is a list of records set by both individuals and groups in various categories at 2300 Arena.

=== Professional wrestling ===
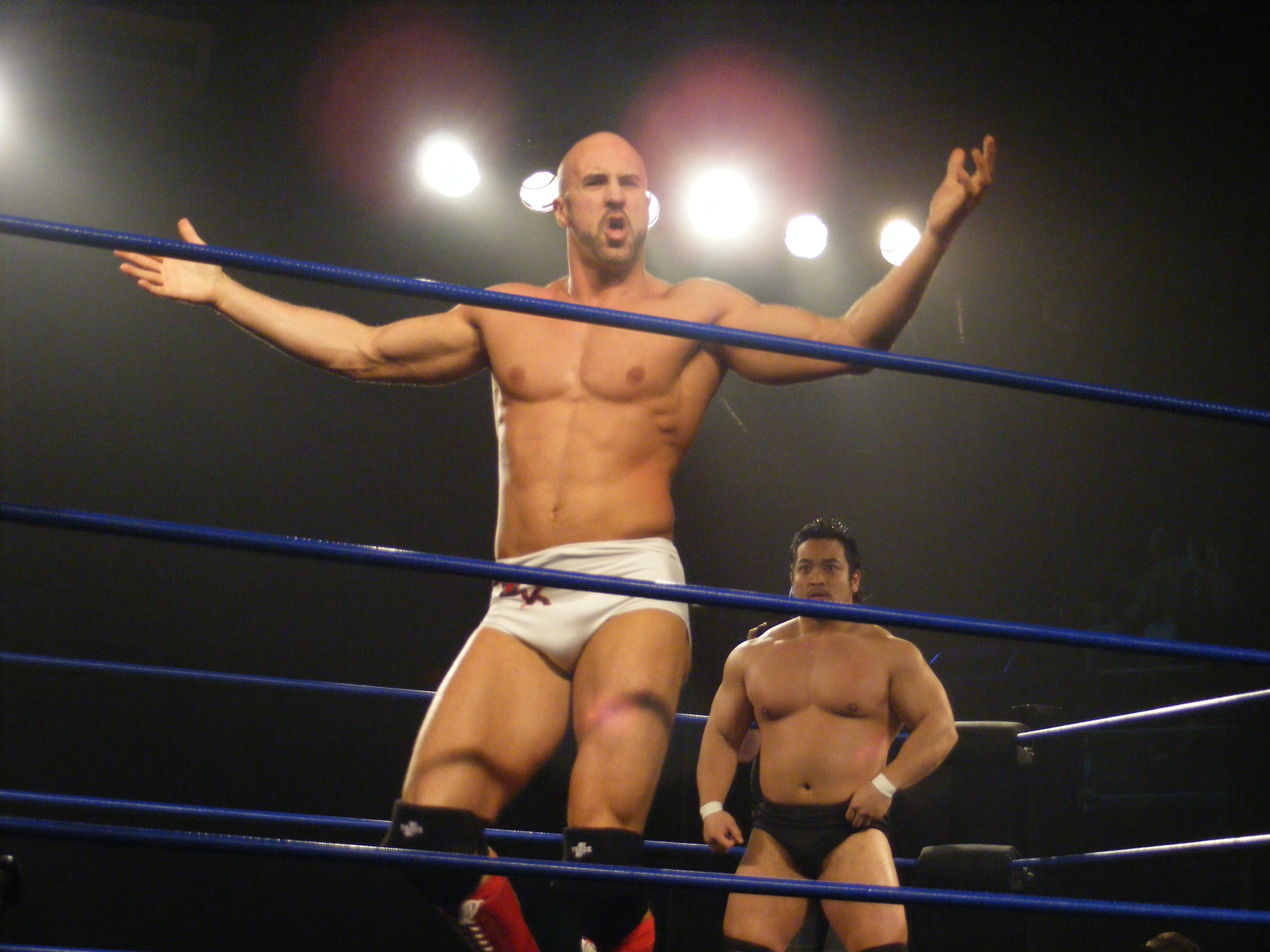
Claudio Castagnoli (left) wrestling Daisuke Sekimoto at the venue during Chikara King of Trios on April 25, 2010

- Most matches: 154, Ruckus
- Most events: 136, Combat Zone Wrestling
- Highest attendance: 1,850, Mike Awesome vs. Spike Dudley, January 15, 2000
- First match: Road Warrior Hawk defeated Don E. Allen and The Samoan Warrior, May 14, 1993
- Longest match: 1:04:00, Claudio Castagnoli, Eddie Kingston, Gran Akuma, Mike Quackenbush and The Colony (Fire Ant, Soldier Ant and Worker Ant) vs. Atsushi Ohashi, Daisuke Sekimoto, Jaki Numazawa, Katsumasa Inoue, Ryuji Ito, Shinya Ishikawa and Yuji Okabayashi, October 19, 2008
- Shortest match: 0:09, The Sandman vs. Chad Austin, March 4, 1994; Tommy Dreamer and Johnny Gunn vs. Johnny Hotbody and Tony Stetson, November 13, 1993
- Most tournament wins: 4, Claudio Castagnoli

=== Professional boxing ===
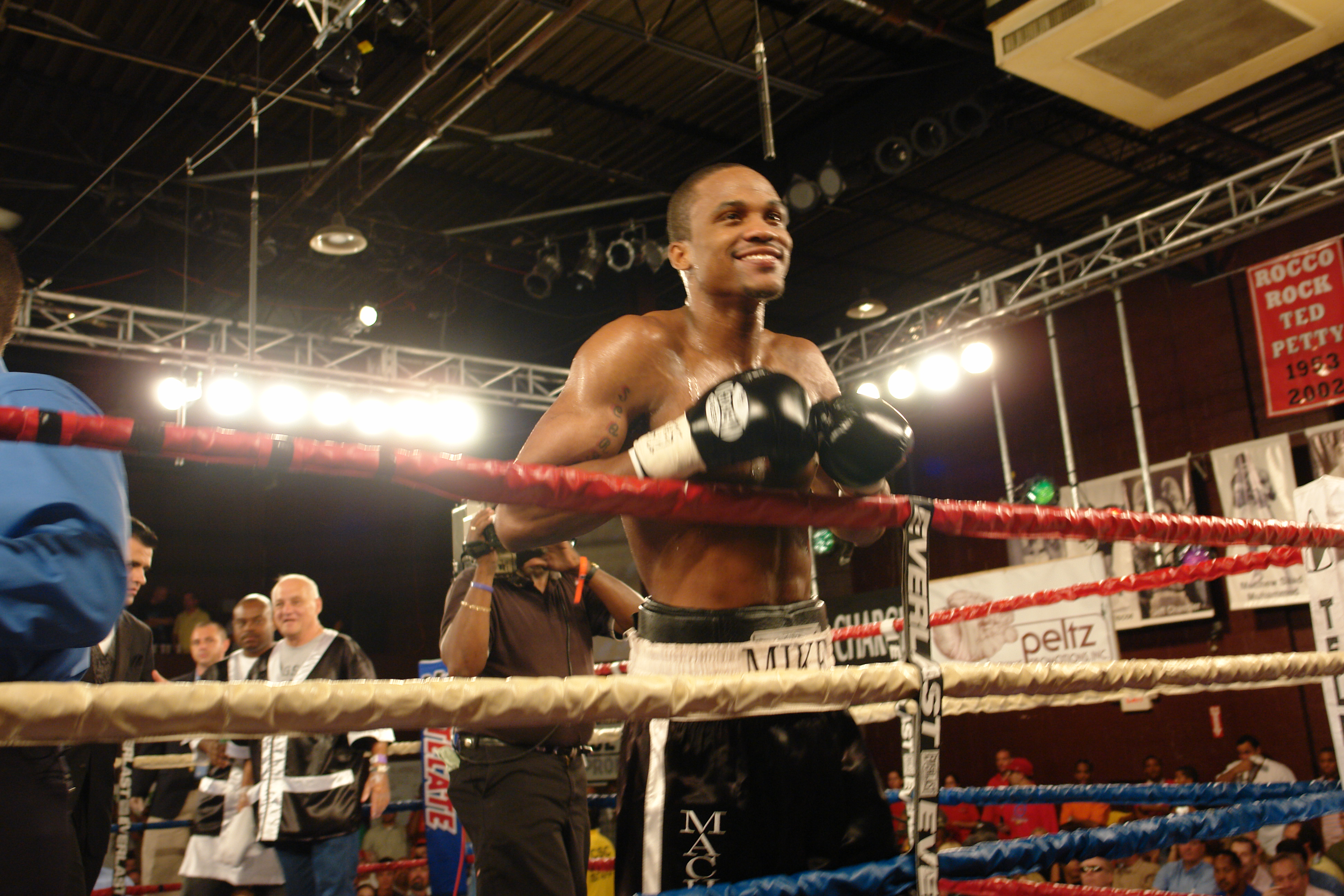
Mike Jones at the venue for his ninth professional fight against Doel Carrasquillo on July 20, 2007

- Most matches: 12, Mike Jones
- Most events: 44, Peltz Boxing Promotions
- Highest attendance: 1,433, Christian Carto vs. Victor Ruiz, February 8, 2019
- First match: Earl Clark defeated Kevin Swain, September 24, 1993
- Longest match: 12 rounds, Keita Obara vs. Kudratillo Abdukakhorov, March 30, 2019; Derek Ennis vs. Gabriel Rosado, July 30, 2010; Enrique Ornelas vs. Bronco McKart, August 10, 2007; Rogers Mtagwa vs. Aldo Valtierra, July 20, 2007; Demetrius Hopkins vs. Mario Ramos, March 3, 2006; Larry Mosley vs. Miguel Figueroa, March 3, 2006
- Shortest match: 0:22, Derrick Webster vs. Obodai Sai, November 25, 2014

=== Mixed martial arts ===
- Most matches: 4, Sean Brady
- Most events: 29, Cage Fury Fighting Championships
- Highest attendance: 1,300, LeVon Maynard vs. Matt Makowski, February 27, 2010
- First match: Dan Matala defeated Nick Simonetta, August 21, 2009
- Longest match: 5 rounds, Cedric Gunnison vs. Zulkarnaiyn Kamchybekov, March 31, 2023; Bassil Hafez vs. Evan Cutts, April 1, 2021; Jason Norwood vs. Jeremiah Wells, August 17, 2018
- Shortest match: 0:15, Brylan Van Artsdalen vs. Shane Hutchinson, June 11, 2010

== Promotional history ==
=== Professional wrestling ===
These professional wrestling promotions have held events at 2300 Arena.

- (United States) Extreme Championship Wrestling (1993–2000)
- (United States) Soul City Wrestling (1998)
- (United States) Break the Barrier (1999)
- (United States) Jersey All Pro Wrestling (2000–2010)
- (United States) Main Event Championship Wrestling (2001)
- (United States) Combat Zone Wrestling (2001–2018)
- (United States) Pro-Pain Pro Wrestling (2002–2005)
- (United States) Women's Extreme Wrestling (2002–2009)
- (United States) Major League Wrestling (2002–present)
- (United States) Xtreme Pro Wrestling (2002–2003)
- (United States) Independent Championship Wrestling (2002)
- (United States) Heritage Wrestling Alliance (2003)
- (United States) Pro Wrestling World-1 (2004)
- (United States) Hardcore Homecoming (2005)
- (United States) IWA Mid-South (2005–2007)
- (Canada) International Wrestling Syndicate (2005)
- (United States) Chikara (2005–2015)
- (United States) Dangerous Women of Wrestling (2006–2010)
- (United States) Ring of Honor (2006–2025)
- (United States) Pro Wrestling Unplugged (2006–2008)
- (United States) United Wrestling Federation (2006–2007)
- (United States) Total Nonstop Action Wrestling (2006–2024)
- (United States) World Wrestling Entertainment (2006–2024)
- (Japan) Dragon Gate (2006)
- (United States) Pro Wrestling Xplosion (2006)
- (United States) Juggalo Championship Wrestling (2006–2007)
- (United States) Wicked Hanuman (2007)
- (United States) Velocity Pro Wrestling (2008–2009)
- (United States) Legends of the Arena (2009)
- (United States) Dragon Gate USA (2009–2011)
- (United States) American Luchacore (2009)
- (Germany) Westside Xtreme Wrestling (2010–2011)
- New Japan Pro-Wrestling (2011–2023)
- (United States) Evolve Wrestling (2012–2019)
- (United States) Extreme Rising (2013)
- (United States) Masked Republic (2014–2022)
- (United States) Wrestling with Disaster (2014)
- (United States) House of Hardcore (2014–2019)
- (United States) Women Superstars Uncensored (2015)
- (United States) Roger Artigiani's Lucha Libre (2016)
- (United States) Game Changer Wrestling (2016–2026)
- (United States) World of Unpredictable Wrestling (2016)
- (United States) WildKat Pro Wrestling (2017–2018)
- (United States) Micro Championship Wrestling (2017)
- (United Kingdom) Progress Wrestling (2018)
- (United States) M.A.S.S. Entertainment (2019)
- (United States) Battleground Championship Wrestling (2021–2025)
- (Japan) World Wonder Ring Stardom (2024)
- (United States) WrestleCon (2024)
- (United States) National Wrestling Alliance (2024–present)
- (United States) Tri-State Wrestling Alliance (2025)
- (United States) All Elite Wrestling (2025)

=== Professional boxing ===
These professional boxing (including kickboxing and bare-knuckle boxing) promotions have held events at 2300 Arena.

- (United States) Don Elbaum Promotions (1993)
- (United States) Dee Lee Promotions (2000–2007)
- (United States) Peltz Boxing Promotions (2004–2019)
- (United States) Power Productions (2005–2010)
- (United States) Golden Boy Promotions (2006–2015)
- (United States) Top Rank (2007–2019)
- (United States) Don Chargin Productions (2007–2011)
- (United States) Joe Hand Promotions (2007–2022)
- (United States) Prime Time Entertainment (2007)
- (United States) Xtreme Productions Inc. (2009)
- (United States) Shalyte Entertainment (2009)
- (United States) KEA Boxing (2010–2011)
- (Russia) No Limits Promotions (2010)
- (United States) Greg Cohen Promotions (2012–2018)
- (United States) Main Events (2012–2014)
- (United States) BAM Boxing (2014–2022)
- (United States) D&D Management (2014)
- (United States) Price Promotions (2014–2021)
- (United States) King's Promotions (2015–2025)
- (United States) TGB Promotions (2016)
- (United States) Final Forum (2016)
- (United States) GH3 Promotions (2016–2020)
- (United States) Victory Boxing Promotions (2016–2017)
- (United States) CES Boxing (2017)
- (United States) Hard Hitting Promotions (2018–2023)
- (United States) Raging Babe Events (2019)
- (United States) RDR Promotions (2020–2022)
- (United States) Jeter Promotions (2021–2022)
- (United States) R&B Promotions (2023–2024)
- (United States) Team Combat League (2024–2025)
- (United States) DiBella Entertainment (2024)
- (United States) Swift Promotions (2024–2025)
- (United States) KOhen Promotions (2024–2025)
- (United States) Tale of Garcia (2024)
- (United States) Bare Knuckle Fighting Championship (2025)
- (United States) ProBox Promotions (2025)
- (United States) Overtime Boxing (2025)

=== Mixed martial arts ===
These mixed martial arts promotions have held events at 2300 Arena.

- (United States) Extreme Force Productions (2009)
- (United States) Asylum Fight League (2009–2017)
- (United States) Matrix Fights (2010)
- (United States) Locked In The Cage (2011)
- (United States) Cage Fury Fighting Championships (2014–2025)
- (United States) Dead Serious MMA (2015–2016)
- (United States) World Cagefighting Championships (2016)
- (United States) Art of War Cage Fighting (2017–2020)
- (United States) CES MMA (2018)

=== Concerts ===
These musicians and comedians have performed headlining concerts at 2300 Arena.

- (United States) Biohazard (2003)
- (United States) (Japan) Peelander-Z (2006)
- (United States) Shovelhook (2007)
- (United States) Assemblage 23 (2007)
- (United States) New York Dolls (2008)
- (United States) Sapremia (2008)
- (United States) Gorgeous Frankenstein (2008)
- (United States) Imperative Reaction (2008)
- (United States) Deicide (2009)
- (United States) Absu (2009)
- (United States) Drop the Lime (2010)
- (United States) Stan Bush (2011)
- (Mexico) Kinto Sol (2015–2017)
- (United States) TKA (2015)
- (United States) Fabulous Thunderbirds (2015)
- (Finland) Stone (2016)
- (United States) Big Freedia (2016)
- (United States) Trina (2016)
- (Canada) Pat Travers Band (2016)
- (United States) John Corabi (2017)
- (United States) Michale Graves (2017)
- (United States) Rick Ross (2018)
- (United States) Meek Mill (2018)
- (United States) Beanie Sigel (2018)
- (Ghana) Michael Blackson (2018)
- (Russia) Katya Zamolodchikova (2019)
- (United Kingdom) Carl Palmer (2019–2022)
- (United States) Tantric (2019)
- (United States) All or Nothing (2022)
- (United States) Steven Adler (2022)
- (United States) Autograph (2022)
- (United States) Jeff Hardy (2024)

=== Training ===
These professional boxing and professional wrestling schools have held training sessions at 2300 Arena.

- (United States) ECW Wrestling Academy/House of Hardcore (1993–2001)
- (United States) Joe Hand Boxing Gym (2004–2009)
- (United States) CZW Pro Wrestling Academy (2005–2012)
- (United States) Wrestle Factory (2005–2012)
- (United States) Xtreme Fight Club Wrestling Academy (2006–2007)

== Special features ==
=== Hardcore Hall of Fame ===
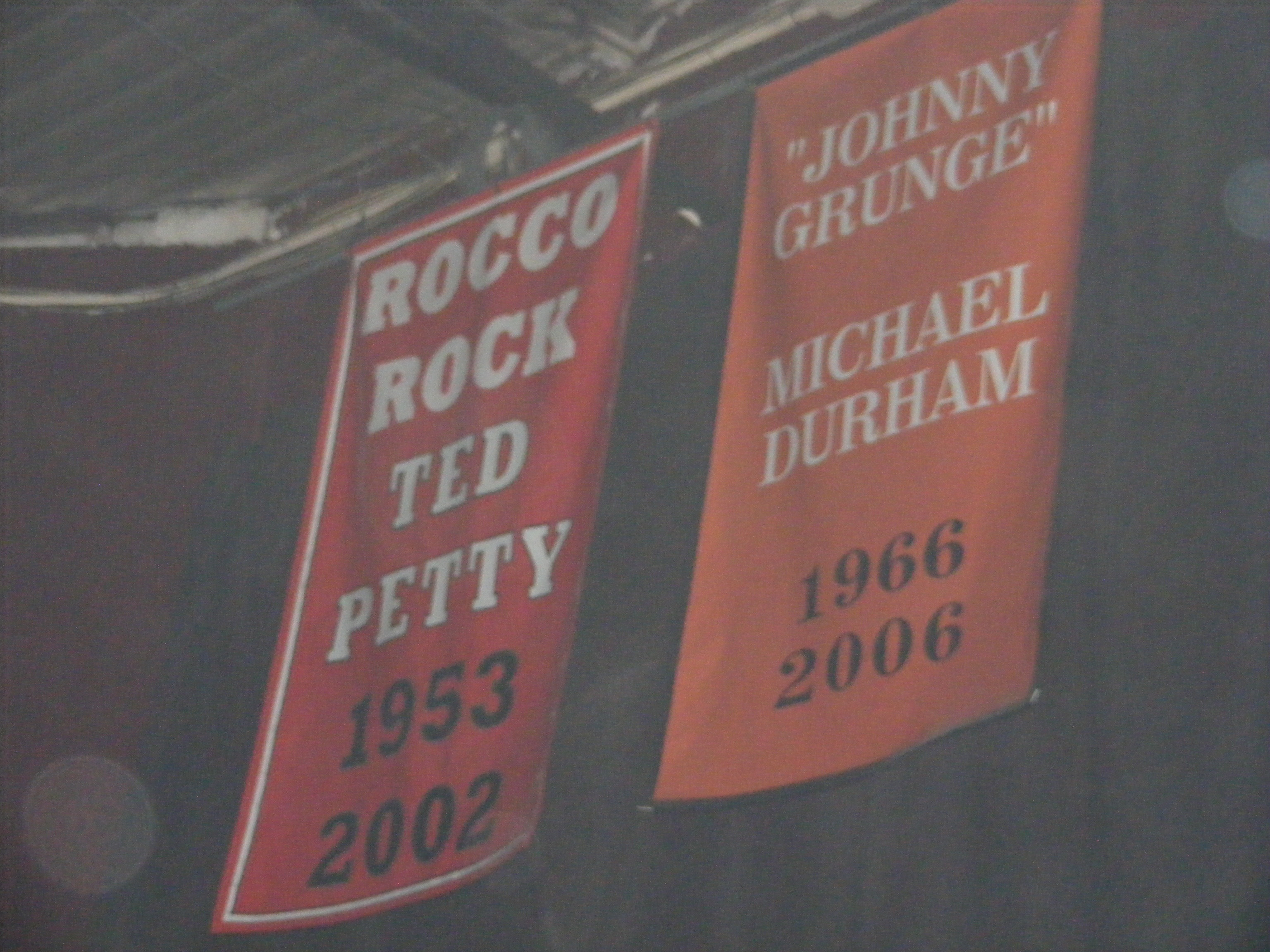
Hardcore Hall of Fame banners paying tribute to Rocco Rock and Johnny Grunge on April 23, 2010

The venue is home to the Hardcore Hall of Fame, which commemorates the careers of professional wrestlers and wrestling personalities who have contributed to the legacy of both 2300 Arena and hardcore wrestling. It was established in 2002 following the death of former Extreme Championship Wrestling star Rocco Rock, who suffered a fatal heart attack while driving to the venue for an appearance with Pro-Pain Pro Wrestling. Banners representing all inductees are on permanent display within the venue.

=== Bar 2300 ===
The venue's lobby contains Bar 2300, a bar with a capacity of 350 that provides service during events, and also hosts intimate concert performances. Vicki Pohl, niece of Bruce Montgomery, runs in-house catering.

Tributes to the venue's past are represented by the bar's decor, with paintings by artist Christy Bottie that commemorate prior wrestling and combat sport events. Bottie also painted a mural dedicated to Extreme Championship Wrestling in the men's room, which has since become a popular photo op.

== Transportation access ==
2300 Arena is located within two miles of both the Front Street exit (Exit 351) of Interstate 76, and the Christopher Columbus Boulevard exit (Exit 20) of Interstate 95.

On-street parking is available in front of the building on South Swanson Street, and to the side of the building on both West Ritner Street and Wolf Street.

SEPTA maintains bus stops located within walking distance from the venue, providing local service on Route 7 (Weccacoe Avenue and Wolf Street), Route 57 (2nd Street and West Ritner Street), and Route G (Oregon Avenue and Front Street).
