= Russell Redenbaugh =

American investor (born 1945)

Russell G. Redenbaugh (born July 14, 1945) is an American investor, speaker, and author. He served on the United States Commission on Civil Rights from 1990 to 2005. Blind from the age of sixteen due to an accident which also cost him six of his fingers, he is one of only two known blind jiu jitsu black belts in the world. Redenbaugh is a three-time world champion in jiu jitsu, fighting sighted opponents. Redenbaugh is a recipient of the Louis Braille Award from the Pennsylvania Council for the Blind.

== Early life and education ==
Redenbaugh was born July 14, 1945, in Salt Lake City, Utah. When he was 16, on May 19, 1962, an accidental explosion while building a model rocket removed six of his fingers and rendered him blind, along with other shrapnel injuries. Determined not to live as a dependent, Redenbaugh decided to dedicate himself to learning and accomplishment and make his own fortune. He was accepted into the University of Utah, and graduated magna cum laude in 1967.

Redenbaugh was rejected from graduate programs at both Harvard University and Stanford University due to his disability, an experience that would contribute to his later work in civil rights. Accepted into the Wharton School, he received his Master of Business Administration with honors in 1969, finishing sixth in his class.

== Early career ==
After being repeatedly rejected for jobs due to his disability, Redenbaugh was hired as Securities Analyst at the Philadelphia investment firm of Cooke & Bieler. Over the following decade, Redenbaugh helped to grow the firm from a tiny company to having assets of over $6 billion, while maintaining the number of partners at seven. He and his partners accomplished this growth through reorganizing the research to greatly improve future predictions, the beginning of his focus on policy-based investment. Redenbaugh was Chief Investment Officer of Cooke & Bieler by 1980. He continued his relationship with that firm through 1999 in various capacities.

== Civil Rights Commission ==
Circa 1990, Redenbaugh was seeking a position as governor of the Federal Reserve Board, and in the process, became acquainted with Senator Bob Dole. Dole appointed Redenbaugh to serve on the United States Commission on Civil Rights, as its first disabled member.

Redenbaugh served on the commission from 1990 until 2005, when he resigned in protest over financial mismanagement and partisanship; he recommended that the Commission be disbanded. An independent conservative, he was one of the longest-serving members of the panel, with a self-stated goal of affecting policy change and making it easier for people in protected classes to gain equal standing. He was a critic of the Americans With Disabilities Act and called for its reform

Redenbaugh also participated in hearings of the Bush v. Gore election case. He co-authored the dissent to the commission's finding that the state was guilty of influencing election results.

== Technology consulting and investment ==
Upon his departure from Cooke & Bieler, Redenbaugh was temporarily bound by a noncompete contract. Unable to manage money professionally, he joined a computer startup (Action Technologies) as CEO in the late 1980s. In the mid-1990s, he contributed to that company's patented workflow method. Action Technologies was ultimately unsuccessful, but along with two partners, Redenbaugh began advising other technology companies in exchange for cash and stock options.

By the late 1990s, Redenbaugh was providing management consulting to a small collection of major high-tech companies, including Applied Materials, KLA Tencor and IBM. Concurrently, he was managing his own fortune and, at the request of some contacts, began taking on investment clients. This eventually grew into an investment firm, Kairos Capital Advisors.

Prior to the 2008 financial crisis, Kairos focused on investing in companies (e.g. Apple). Post-crisis, the investment strategy changed, formally applying political and economic policy analysis to determine the best and worst asset classes for investment.

=== Principles of investment process ===
Kairos Capital Advisors' operating theory, developed by Redenbaugh and his partner James Juliano, is based on understanding government policy, which produces headwinds and tailwinds for asset classes. Returns are overwhelmingly guided by asset allocations: If an investor performs item selection in aggregate, the winners and losers will cancel each other out. Asset classes, by and large, will either win or lose.

With the success of this approach, Redenbaugh and partner James Juliano founded the Reading The World investment advice newsletter in 2012 to provide insights and applications of this approach.

In 2014, Kairos Capital Advisors began applying these analyses to the holdings of institutions and family offices.

== Jiu jitsu ==
At the age of fifty, Redenbaugh took up the practice and training of the martial art of Brazilian jiu jitsu. He trained with Phil Migliarese, Saulo Ribeiro, Jean Jacques Machado and Eduardo Rocha, and to fight sighted opponents. As a blind person missing fingers, he won the World Jiu Jitsu Championships for his weight and belt in 2003, 2004 and 2005. He also competed in the unlimited weight division each year, earning silver medals in 2004 and 2005.

In 2010, Redenbaugh became a Brazilian jiu jitsu black belt. In 2015, he earned a red stripe designation above the black belt.

== Personal life ==
Redenbaugh lives in Philadelphia. He married management consultant Natalia (Davis) Redenbaugh, who died on September 3, 2018, at the age of 52. He has three children from previous marriages.

Redenbaugh is a founding member of the Lexington Institute and works with the RGR Foundation, an organization focused on helping other good causes with funding and support. One of these causes, the "Russell School" in northern India, is a school for blind students. the RGR Foundation also provided computers to the affiliated orphanage.

Redenbaugh was selected as an Olympic torchbearer for the 2002 Salt Lake City Winter Olympics.
