= Ricardo Celis =

Mexican-American sportscaster

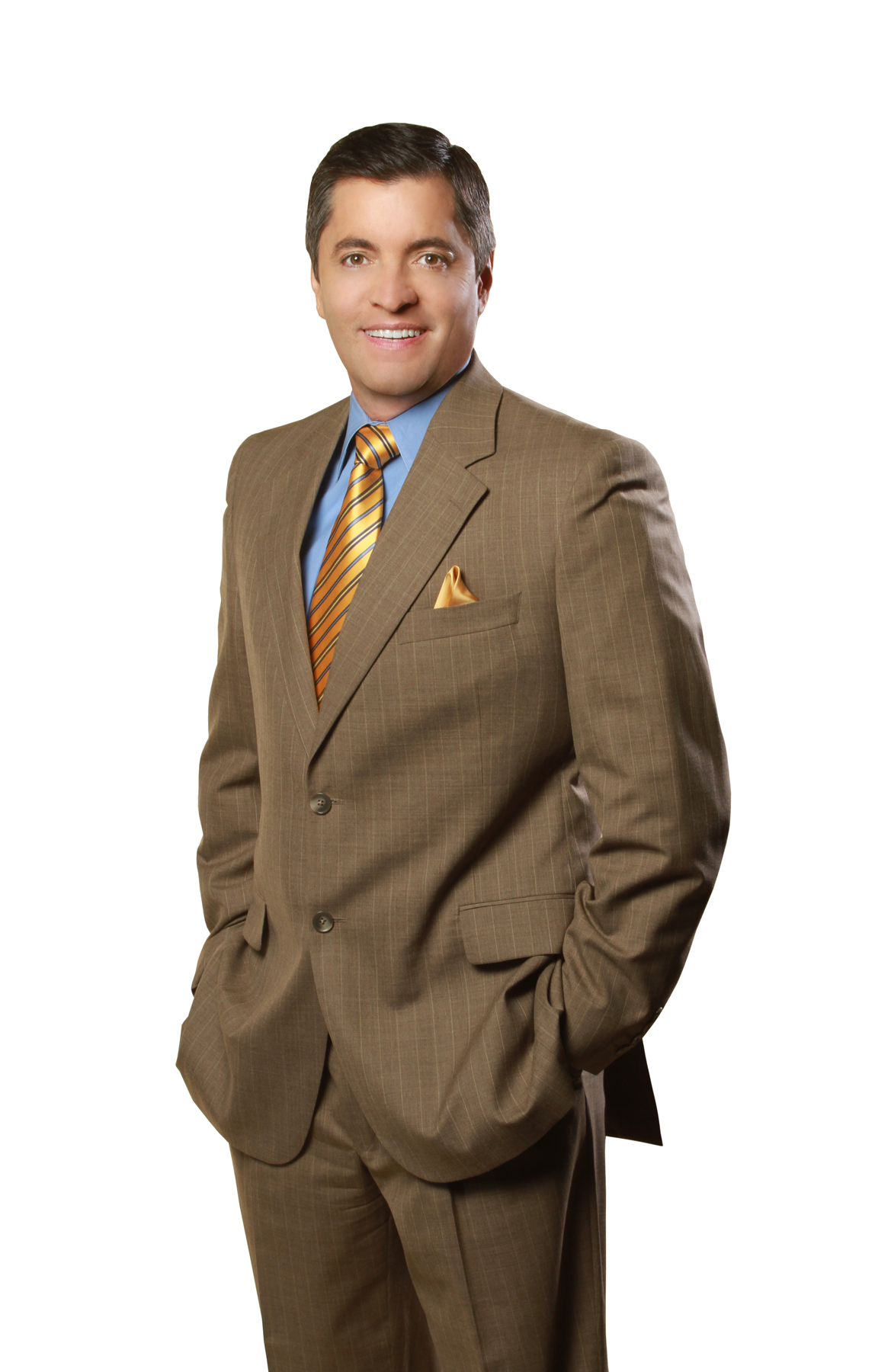
- Celis on June 14, 2012
- Born: Ricardo Celis Flores; Tampico, Tamaulipas, Mexico
- Occupation: Sportscaster
- Spouse: Silvia Couso-Celis (m. 1997)
- Children: Ricky, Sophia and Jessica
- Parent(s): Maria Esther Flores and Fernando Celis Pascal

Ricardo Celis Flores (born August 24, 1962, in Tampico, Tamaulipas, Mexico) is a Mexican-American Spanish-language sportscaster.

He was the host and commentator of all the Los Angeles Lakers Spanish TV shows for Time Warner Cable Deportes, and he is also the Spanish TV voice of Chivas USA, Los Angeles Sparks and LA Galaxy in-studio anchor.

During his career in broadcasting, Celis has covered a number of premiere events, including the Super Bowl, World Series, NBA Finals, the Olympics, Copa America, Pan American Games and World Boxing Bouts.

== Early life ==
Ricardo Celis was born in Colonia Flores in Tampico, Tamaulipas, Mexico, the son of Maria Esther Flores and Fernando Celis Pascal, a radiologist MD.

Following high school Celis was granted a full scholarship to play football at Universidad del Noreste. He played for four years with the Jaguars as tight end (TE) and quarterback (QB) his senior year. Celis majored in mass media communications. He attended Incarnate Word College in San Antonio, Texas; he is a masters candidate in television production.

== Broadcasting career ==
=== Early career ===
Celis began his sports journalism career in 1984 when he served as a reporter and photographer for the El Sol de Tampico newspaper in Mexico. In this capacity, he covered the Tampico Madero soccer team. In 1986 he moved to San Antonio, Texas, as KEDA–1540AM news director and the official voice of the San Antonio Missions Triple A Baseball team and as a backupplay-by-play announcer for the San Antonio Spurs.

=== Univision ===
His career with Univision began in 1989, when he worked as the sports producer and reporter for KWEX-Channel 41, in San Antonio.

In 1990, he was promoted as the sports director in KVEA-TV Channel 52 in Los Angeles, California, doing play-by-play in Spanish for the National Football League Los Angeles Raiders.

He made a comeback as a sports anchor and TV show host at KWEX-Channel 41, in San Antonio from 1992 to 1994.

=== Telemundo ===
Celis relocated to Miami in 1994, hired by Telemundo Network to host the Spanish news magazine show "Alta Tensión" as news anchor. Months later he was transferred to "Boxeo Telemundo" as the play-by-play commentator, and the sports anchor of the TV news magazine Ocurrió Así.

In Boxeo Telemundo Celis called the action of many of the biggest boxing championship fights: Chavez vs De la Hoya, Chávez vs Meldrick Taylor, Tyson vs Holyfield, Carbajal vs González and Finito López vs Nene Sánchez, just to name a few.

In Ocurrió Así Celis had a segment called "Reto A Ricardo", where he traveled all over the world taking challenges, like skydiving in the Amazons River, Air combat in a World War II plane, Skip Barber Racing school, Reverse Bungee, Snowboarding, Water ski, Power Boats, Formula 3 car races.

In 1997, Celis was promoted to Noticiero Telemundo Chicago, as the sports anchor.

Later in 1999 he became sports anchor at Univision Channel 23 WLTV.

=== HBO Latinoamerica ===
From 2006 to 2010 Celis became a familiar voice and face for boxing fans, doing play by play with HBO Latinoamerica, calling the action in a large list of boxing championships fights.

=== Univision Network ===
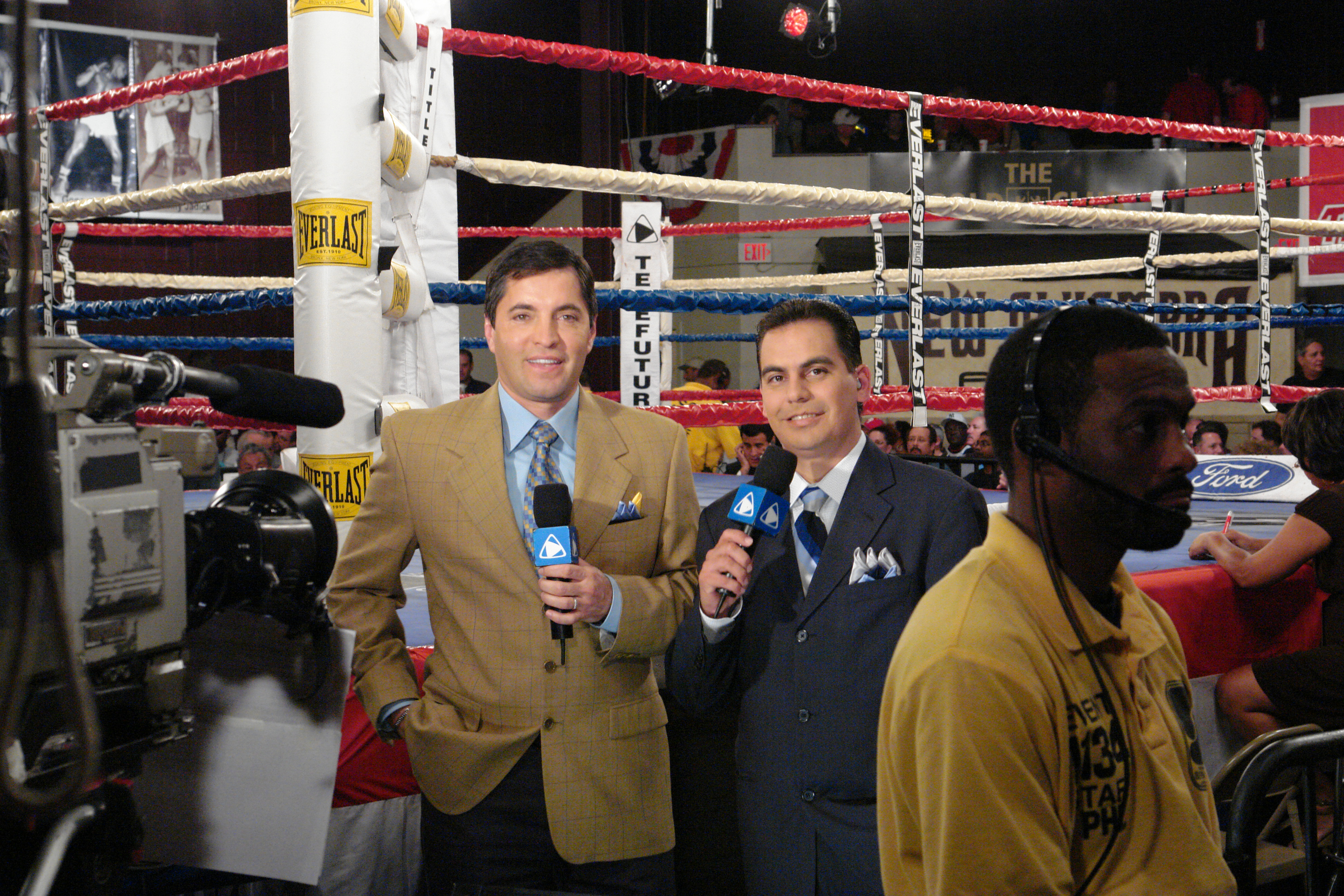
Celis and Bernardo Osuna broadcasting a July 20, 2007, card from New Alhambra Arena for Solo boxeo

From 1999 to 2011, Celis joined Univision Deportes as a sports anchor on the TeleFutura Network nightly news show Contacto Deportivo and as play-by-play announcer and co-host with Bernando Osuna of Solo boxeo, a weekly night live boxing series.

Solo boxeo debuted in 2000 as a one-hour Sunday afternoon show on Univision; in 2002 it was shifted to the sister network Telefutura in a two-hour Friday night time slot.

"Although the show is one of the network's most popular series, it is one of its most costly and will end its run in December".

Solo boxeo aired more than 400 fight cards; the show was terminated in 2008 with Celis and Osuna hosting the show, but Celis remained as a sports anchor in Contacto Deportivo and as a boxing expert.

Celis provided the play-by-play for different sports such as soccer, basketball (men's and women's), baseball and football, and was the main anchor for Contacto Deportivo during the 2006 World Cup in Germany and 2010 World Cup in South Africa.

He front-lined Super Bowl XLV broadcasts for Univisión and Contacto Deportivo.

In 2011, he was the main anchor for Contacto Deportivo during Copa América 2011 in Argentina.

He also has been co-host of several network shows like Despierta America, Escandalo TV and Republica Deportiva. In Contacto Deportivo, Celis showed his skills as a reporter and taking part of the action in a segment called "Contacto Extremo".

=== Grupo Latino de Radio ===
He accepted the position of sports director/ anchor at Grupo Latino de Radio Networks. - Radio Grupo Prisa from 2012 to 2013.

=== Time Warner Cable Deportes ===
In August 2012 Ricardo Celis joined Time Warner Cable Deportes as a sports anchor and host of the Lakers Show.

In September 2015, Celis along with 30 employees were fired from the three Southern California Time Warner Cable sports channels due to low ratings.

== Career timeline ==
- 1984–1986 Reporter/photographer El Sol de Tampico in Tampico, Tamaulipas, Mexico
- 1989–1989 News director KEDA–1540AM Radio Jalapeño San Antonio, Texas
- 1990–1992 Sports anchor KVEA-TV Channel 52 in Los Angeles, California
- 1991–1994 News director KSAH–720AM Radio Festival San Antonio, Texas
- 1992–1994 Sports anchor and TV show host KWEX-Channel 41 San Antonio, Texas
- 1994–1998 News and sports anchor for Telemundo Network
- 2006–2010 Boxing play by play – HBO Latinoamerica
- 1999–2011 Sports anchor & boxing play by play for Univision Network – Telefutura Network
- 2012–2013 Sports director/anchor GLR Networks - Radio Grupo Prisa
- 2012- Now sports anchor/Lakers Show host - Time Warner Cable Deportes

== Awards ==
Celis has won two Emmy Awards. First time in 1992 as a host in KVEA-TV Channel 52 in Los Angeles, California, second in 2012 for his coverage of Live Special Events as the Lakers Show Host.

He was named Sports Anchor of the year in 2010 by Miami Life Awards, and in 2003 he was recipient of the Excellence in Television award from the World Boxing Organization.

== Signature calls ==
- "Cachetadas Guajoloteras!!" (English: Hit like a slap) No very solid hit – Boxing
- "Le sacudió las Neuronas (English: Shook his neurons) Big hit on the chin – Boxing
- "Le retumbó las amalgamas (English: He rumbled his amalgams) Big hit on the mouth or chin – Boxing
- "Ahora Si póngase el cinturón de seguridad y acomódese el protector bucal (English: Now is time to fasten your seat belt, and position your mouthpiece) Get ready right before a boxing fight – Boxing
