= Joseph Hand =

Joseph Hand may refer to:

- Joseph W. Hand (1845–1929), American businessman
- Joe Hand Sr. (1936–2024), American businessman and media executive
- Joey Hand (born 1979), American racing driver
