= Ricardo Migliarese =

American professional Brazilian Jiu Jitsu grappler

- Born: December 17, 1978 (age 47)
- Nickname: Animal
- Nationality: American
- Team: Balance
- Trainer: Relson Gracie
- Rank: 5th degree black belt in Brazilian Jiu-Jitsu

Other information
- Website: www.balancestudios.net

Ricardo "Animal" Migliarese (aka Rick Migliarese, born December 17, 1978) is an American professional Brazilian Jiu Jitsu grappler and a 5th degree Relson Gracie Brazilian Jiu Jitsu Black Belt with approximately 20 years of experience in BJJ and Mixed Martial Arts. A World and Pan-Am Champion, Rick is a trainer, training partner and coach to UFC and MMA fighters as well as other World and Pan-Am Champions. He lives in Philadelphia, PA where he teaches at Balance Studios which he co-owns with his brother, Phil Migliarese. Rick is also one of the co-founders/co-owners of Matrix Fights Promotion Company.

== Brazilian Jiu-Jitsu Training ==
Ricardo began his athletic training with boxing lessons at age 12. His older brother Phil was already studying BJJ at Maxercise and Rick occasionally attended classes at Maxercise with him. It wasn't until age 16 that he began his Brazilian Jiu Jitsu classes regularly, attending class several times a week and cleaning the school to pay for his tuition. Soon, Rick began to compete in in-house tournaments with favorable results. Rick and Phil decided to study the martial art at the Gracie Academy in California and spent much of that time dedicating themselves to their teacher training. Learning directly from Grand Master Helio Gracie as well as other prominent members of the Gracie family, Rick began to take his own practice to the next level.

In 2002, Phil and Rick opened Balance Studios, the only Relson Gracie affiliate in Philadelphia. After injuring his knee in 2004 and knee surgery in 2005, Rick modified a standard guard position, the butterfly guard, so that he could train while protecting his knee. He created the "Broken butterfly" guard which was showcased in an issue of Tap-Out Magazine. Ricardo received his black belt from Relson Gracie in December 2005 and is one of only 28 people to receive this honor from Relson who is notorious for being very hard on promotions.

== Competition ==
In 1999, Rick traveled out of the country for the first time - to Brazil for the Mundials. He won the silver medal in the Blue Belt division to start what would be a successful and impressive professional career. Highlights of his record include:

Brazilian Jiu-Jitsu World Championships

1999 Blue Belt - 2nd Place

USA vs Brazil Championship

2004 Brown Belt - Champion

Pan American Jiu-Jitsu Championships

2008 Black Belt - 3rd Place

2004 Brown Belt - 1st place Champion

2002 Brown Belt - 3rd Place

American National Jiu-Jitsu Championships

2004 Brown Belt - 2nd Place

Major Tournament Accomplishments:

2008 Boris Talis Cup (BJJ vs. Sambo) Gold Medalist

2008 Bud Cup Pro Division - 3rd Place

2007 US Grappling Submission Wrestling Absolute - Gold Medalist

2005 Arnold/Gracie World Championship Black Belt Heavyweight - Gold Medalist

2005 Arnold/Gracie World Championship Black Belt Open - 2nd Place

2005 Arnold/Gracie World Championship Pro Submission Wrestling - 3rd Place

2004 Pro Am Gracie Nationals Brown Belt Open - 3rd Place

2004 Pro Am Gracie Nationals Brown Belt Heavyweight - Champion

2004 Grapplers Quest NA Championships No-Gi Heavyweight - Champion

2004 Copa Atlantica Brown Belt Heavyweight - Champion

2004 Arnold/Gracie World Championship Brown Belt Open - 3rd Place

2004 Arnold/Gracie World Championship Brown Belt Heavyweight - Champion

2004 Grapplers Quest Beast of the East No-Gi Light Heavyweight - Champion

2002 Arnold/Gracie World Championship Purple Belt Open - Champion

2002 Arnold/Gracie World Championship Purple Belt Heavyweight - Champion

2001 Mat Madness Proving Grounds - 3rd Place

2001 NAGA Garden State Championship Purple Belt - Champion

2001 NAGA Garden State Championships No-Gi - Champion

1997 Annual Gracie Jiu-Jitsu Tournament - Gold Medalist

1996 Annual Gracie Jiu-Jitsu Tournament - Gold Medalist

== MMA trainer ==
Rick and Phil have trained professional athletes and MMA fighters including Philadelphia Eagles Tra Thomas and Winston Justice, UFC fighters Frankie Edgar and Waylon Lowe, Bellator fighter Tim Carpenter. Team Balance World and Pan-Am Champions include Rick Macauley, Dan Haney, Timmy Hart, Shaun Smith, Guy Winters, Ken Primola, Noah Spear. Rick and Phil continue to teach adult and children's seminars, regular classes and programs for local police officers and FBI agents. Rick has been featured in several Magazine articles including "Growing Up Gracie" in MMA Worldwide magazine and as an author in Philadelphia Magazine ( "The Jiu Jitsu Lifestyle" ). Migliarese also awarded a black belt to research scientist and podcaster Lex Fridman.
