= St. William Parish (Philadelphia) =

Coordinates: 40.0477°N 75.0981°W

St. William Church
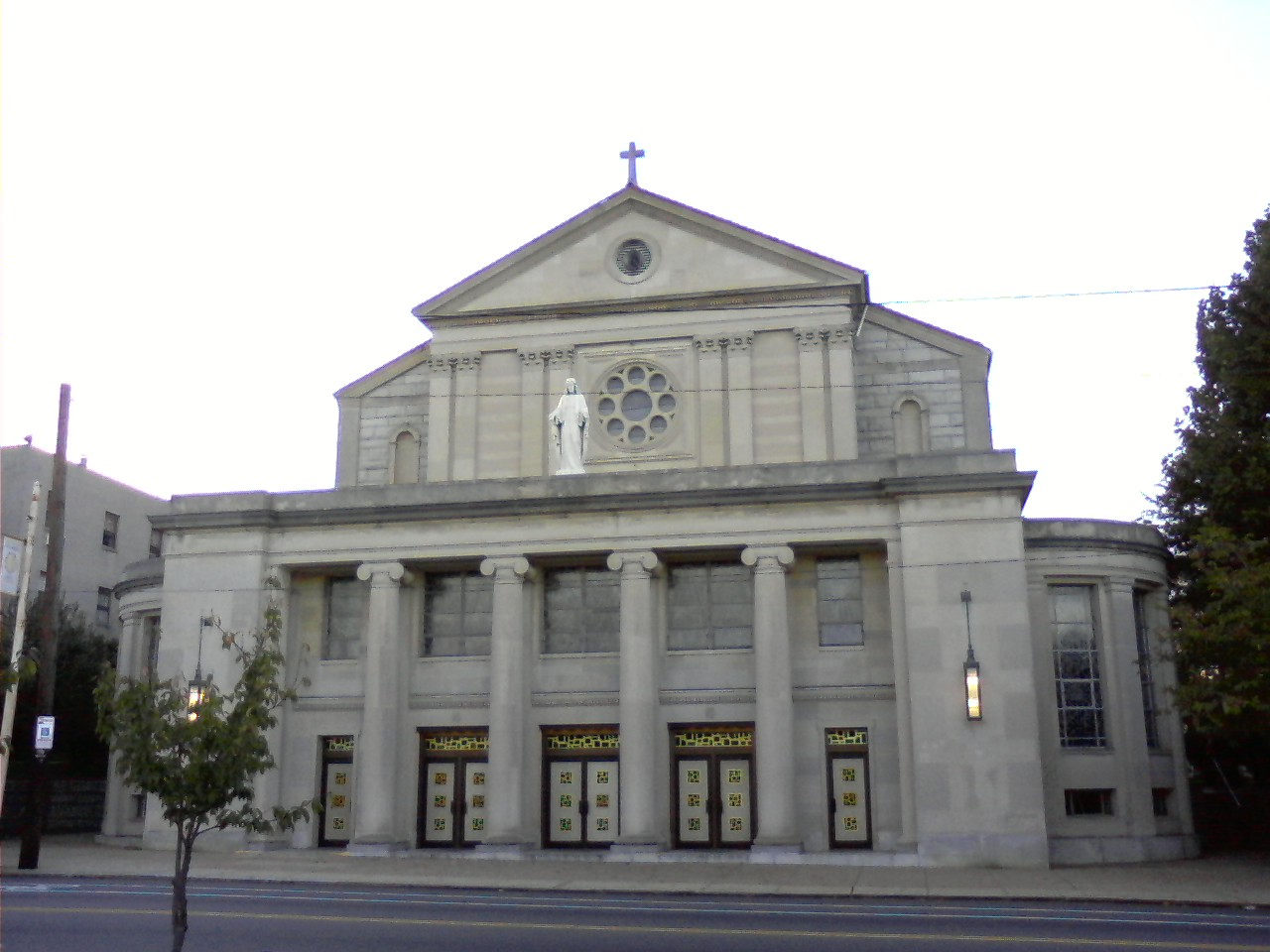

Religion
- Affiliation: Catholic Church
- Diocese: Archdiocese of Philadelphia
- Ecclesiastical or organisational status: Parish Church
- Leadership: Rev. Francesco D'Amico, pastor

Location
- Location: 6200 Rising Sun Avenue; Philadelphia; Pennsylvania, Postal Code 19111; United States

Architecture
- Architects: Gleeson & Mulrooney Firm
- Type: Church
- Style: Neoclassical, Romanesque
- Groundbreaking: 1955
- Completed: Lower Church-1956; Upper Church-1963
- Construction cost: $400,000 +

Specifications
- Direction of façade: East
- Capacity: Lower Church 900; Upper Church 1,250
- Materials: Granite, Sandstone, Tile

Website
- St William Parish

St. William Parish is a Catholic church in the Lawncrest neighborhood of Philadelphia, Pennsylvania, in the United States. It was founded on January 20, 1920, under the leadership of Reverend William A. Motley, initially serving 70 households. The Parish elementary school was opened in 1924.

The parish eventually expanded to include a rectory, convent, kindergarten, lower school, junior high school, day care center, parish hall and the two churches. The school, which reached a peak enrollment of 1,586 students in 1964, closed on June 15, 2012 with a final enrollment of 280 students. As of 2019, the church served 1,830 households totaling 5,080 people, with an average of 1,300 people attending Masses on Sundays.

== History ==
=== The 1920s & 30s - the beginnings of the parish ===
In the early part of the 20th century, the area currently comprising Saint William Parish in the Archdiocese of Philadelphia, was mostly farm lands and made up of the then small communities of Lawndale and the Northern part of Crescentville, and was part of presentation BVM Parish in nearby Cheltenham, Pennsylvania. When the Diocese planned for a new parish in the developing part of Lower Northeast Philadelphia, Archbishop Dennis Dougherty asked Rev. William A. Motley to lead it. On January 20, 1920, St. William Parish was officially founded in honor of the Italian hermit William of Vercelli.

Immediately, a worship location was secured at the Germania Maennerchor Hall at 514 Devereaux Ave with the first mass being held on Jan 23. The new Parish comprising 70 families, spread out within the boundaries of; Cottman Ave to the North, Tookany Creek to the West and Roosevelt Boulevard to the South and East. A Rectory was established at a home at 415 Levick Street that included a small chapel. In 1922, a move to 909 Levick street would be prompted by need for additional space.

In 1921, ground was broken for the combination Church/School at Rising Sun Avenue and Robbins Street. Built of local Bethayres stone. It was dedicated on Nov 27, 1921 by Bishop Michael Crane. In 1923, the parishes of St. Ambrose and St. Martin Of Tours were established which ate up a large portion of St. William's Southern and Eastern parts. New (and current) boundaries were Magee Ave to the North, Phila/Mont.Co Twnshp Line/Philadelphia, Newtown and New York Railroad/Newtown Branch of the Reading Railroad Company to the West, the Oxford Branch of the Pennsylvania Railroad now Pennway Street/Air line through the Naval Supply Depot to the East and Allengrove Street To the South.

In 1924, the St. William elementary school opened for 104 students under the direction of the Sisters of the Servants of the Immaculate Heart of Mary order. The two sisters commuted from St. Joachim's Parish in Frankford each day and converted the church interior for school use during the week, using the pews as desks and kneelers as seats. In 1925, fundraising was begun to build additions to the chapel/school, and by 1929 two additional floors were built to the existing building to give a total of 12 classrooms for the 450 students. The Chapel was eventually converted into a hall, once the new church was completed. This addition to the school was dedicated on October 5, 1930 by Cardinal Dougherty.

A new "basement church" was constructed closer to Devereaux Avenue, completed in 1927, also of Bethayres stone construction with a traditional gothic look on the interior. The Main Church was to be built atop this structure once enough funds were raised and other 'priority building' was completed. A new Rectory was also built in 1927. In 1948, construction was begun on a new convent building. Up to this time the Sisters had been housed in a group of row homes behind the Lower School on Robbins Street where the current Memorial Hall now stands. Most of the buildings of the Parish built between 1920 and 1948 were designed by the Henry D. Dagit & Sons firm.

=== The 1940s and World War II ===
During this time, as the country was in the midst of the Second World War, people who lived in St William sold war bonds, collected scrap metals, served as civilian air raid wardens, and grew food on available land. In May 1943 a party was conducted under the Holy Name Society for returning service personnel from the parish. Twelve men killed in the war were honored with a bronze plaque at a special mass on May 30 of that same year.

317 names appeared on the Roll of Honor of St. William parishioners who served in the armed forces during World War II.

=== The 1950s and 60s – times of change, and growth ===
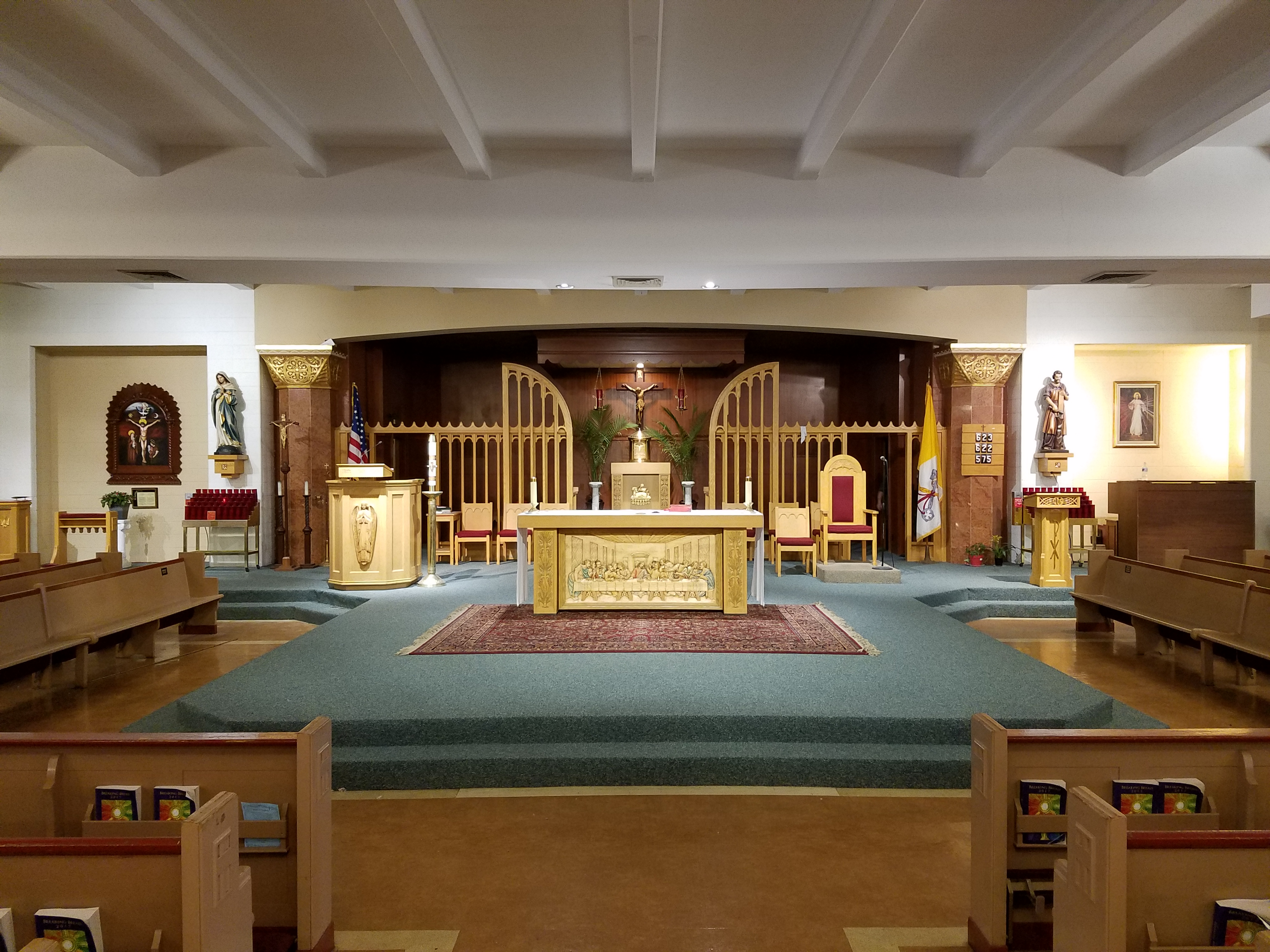
Lower Church Sanctuary (2017)

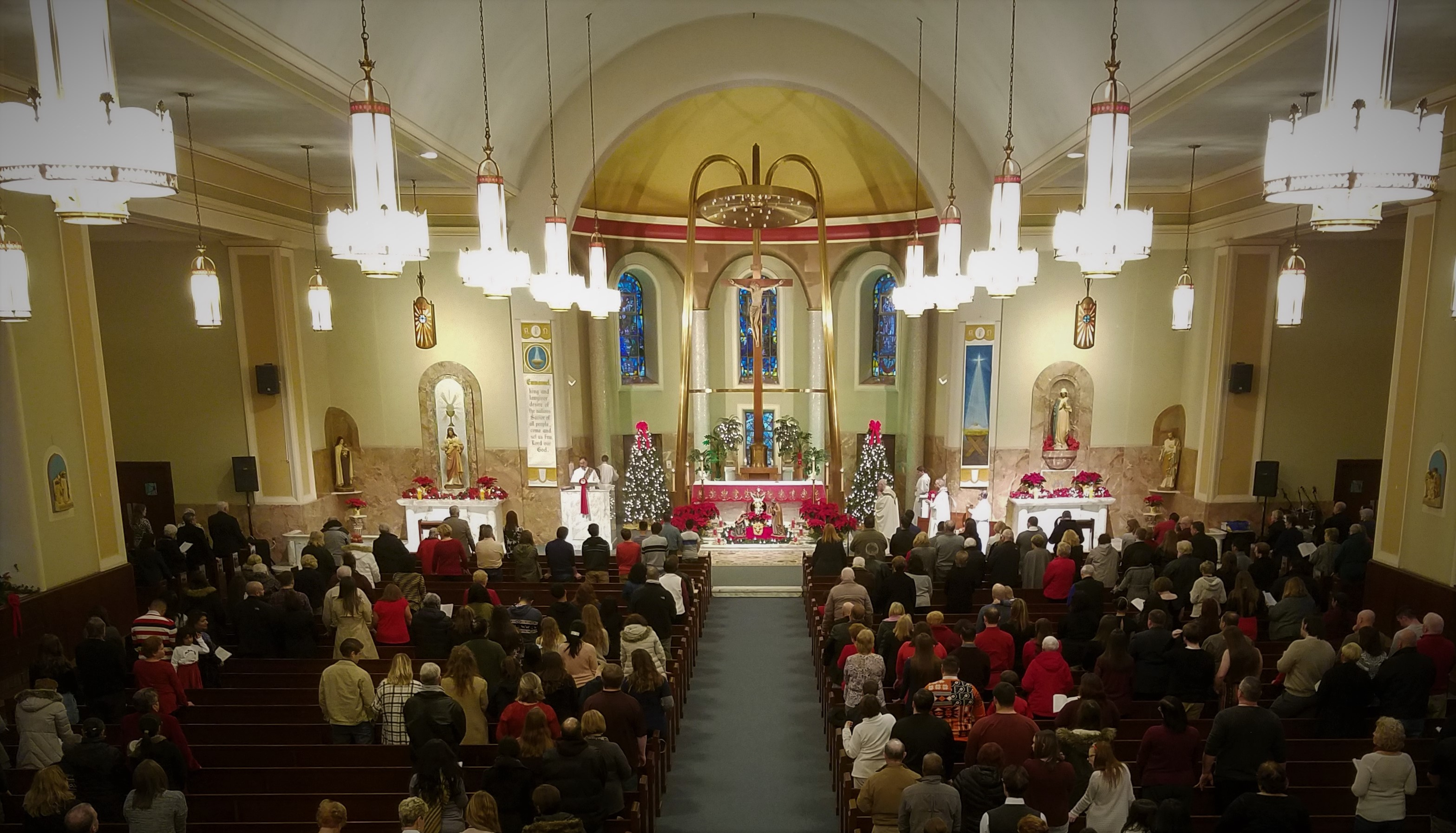
Upper Church during Christmas Eve mass in 2017

The 1950s and 1960s saw many changes come to the physical plant of the Parish that reflected the housing boom of the area, the economic upswing of the times and the growing parish population. Many of the original "Motley Buildings" were completely replaced. The Middle School (Junior High/Upper School) building was built and later an additional floor was added. When consideration was had for the completion of the Upper Church, it was found that the basement church was not structurally sufficient to support additional construction. In 1955, the old church was demolished to make way for the current granite and sandstone building designed by the Gleeson & Mulrooney Architectural firm. The first mass was said in the new church (lower) on December 25, 1956. This Church, now the parish's third, seated 1,000. All of the stained glass windows and some appointments were used from the second church. While structurally complete the parish was still without a "Main Church" as construction debts prohibited completion of the interior of the Upper Church (seating 1,250) until June 1963.

In 1965 with school enrollment now at over 1500, plans were drawn up for a new school building with 12 classrooms to be built behind the Lower School on Robbins, again where Memorial Hall now stands. A fire in early 1966 that destroyed the Rectory shelved those plans and the building was never built. A temporary Rectory was established at 6145 Argyle Street. The current Rectory was completed in 1967.

All substantial changes to the parish physical plant were during the 24-year reign of Father William Boyle, known to parishioners as "The Builder." During his administration the parish population nearly tripled in size.

=== The 1980s – renewed growth ===
James E. Mortimer became St William's 6th pastor in 1980, a post he would hold for 22 years. In 1981 school tuition fees were established with minimum weekly payments required from parents. During his tenure several refurbishments were carried out, in many cases with help from parishioners. Due to an influx of young children in the surrounding neighborhoods in the mid-1980s, a kindergarten was built by volunteers of the parish's "Hammer and Nail Club" as well as a church hall and four new classrooms. The following year, a new Memorial Hall and day care center were completed and dedicated by Archbishop Bevilacqua on October 16, 1988.

In 1989 The Adoration Chapel was opened, dedicated to Mother Katherine Drexel. It is behind the Lower Church Altar with entrance off Argyle Street.

The vacant Annex of the old Lawndale Hospital (now Kindred Hospital) at 6200 Palmetto Street was purchased and provided 14 additional classrooms in 1993. It was known as the Primary School. Enrollment at this time was over 1,300 but shortly after this building opened, the numbers started to drop.

Monsignor Mortimer organised quite elaborate decorations for the various holidays over the years. One most public display, that continues in much smaller form to this day, is the Christmas light display that saw every parish building and tree lit up over the Christmas holiday.

=== The 1990s – at 75 years, the parish peaks ===
By the early 1990s, the Parish, which had started off seventy years earlier with 70 families in a small room, was now a complex of nine buildings and two large churches. Over 9,600 parishioners were on the register and attendance at the Sunday masses was over 4,500 people. In 1995, the Parish celebrated its 75th anniversary.

Starting in the mid-90s, white flight began to take hold on the Lower Northeast. The German, Irish, Polish and Italian make up of the parish was being augmented by Hispanic, Asian and African Americans who were moving into the community. The Parish welcomed the newcomers. Still, registration dropped to 8,900 by 1997 then down to just over 7,000 by 2002. School enrollment dropped from 1,100 in 1997 to just over 700 in 2002. According to Kathleen McDonough, who grew up in the area, Mortimer actively welcomed new arrivals from different ethnic backgrounds, including priests and members of the congregation from Hispanic and South Asian backgrounds.

Though major change was taking place, St. William parish was listed as one of the top 300 parishes in the US in the book "Excellent Catholic Parishes: The Guide to Best Places and Practices" in 2001. St William was one of three parishes in the Diocese and the only parish within the City of Philadelphia to receive this recognition.

=== The 2000s – renewal ===
In 2002, Mortimer retired and Nelson J. Perez was installed as the 7th Pastor of St William.

On January 12, 2009, Perez was assigned as Pastor of St. Agnes Parish, in West Chester, Pa. In his place, St William Parish welcomed the Reverend Scott Brockson as Pastoral Administrator. Fr. Brockson, formerly Pastor of St. Hugh's in North Philadelphia, would hold this temporary position until news came in May 2009 of the assignment of Fr. Joseph G. Watson as the 8th Pastor of St. William Parish. Fr. Watson, a graduate of St. William School, was ordained in 1992 and had served as Pastor of St. Charles Borromeo Parish at 20th and Christian Sts., in South Philadelphia prior to his assignment to St. Wililam. Fr. Watson served St. William Parish until June 20, 2016, when he was reassigned as pastor of Nativity of Our Lord in Warminster PA.

Fr. Scott Brockson remained at St William Parish as an assistant along with Fr. Skip Miller until their new parish assignments took effect in June 2010. Fr Scott took over as Pastor of St. Augustine in Bridgeport and Fr. Skip became a Parochial Vicar for nearby St. Cecilia Parish in Fox Chase.

Fr. Dominic Ishaq served at St. William as a Part-Time Parochial Vicar and Coordinator of the Pakistani Community of the Diocese, from 2004 until 2015.

St. William parish school closed in 2012 due to enrollment decline. St. Cecilia School of Fox Chase, Philadelphia took most of the students while others went to Presentation BVM School in Cheltenham.

As of 2019, attendance over 8 Masses each Sunday averages just under 1,300 people with a current registration of over 5,000. Currently, there are 4 priests living in the Parish Rectory, and a dozen Sister Servants of the Immaculate Heart Of Mary living in the Parish Convent. Two Deacons also serve the Parish.

== Art ==
A parishioner from the Hispanic community painted Señor de los Milagros (English: Lord of the Miracles) which hangs in the lower church. It is a gift to St. William from the Peruvian people of the parish who make up a large portion of the local Hispanic community. Each year in October, the Peruvian Community of St. William host a celebration of this feast with a special Mass and procession around the neighborhood in which they carry a palanquin with a much larger version of this painting on their shoulders, followed by a festival in the hall. This celebration draws hundreds of people of Peruvian descent from across the Delaware Valley Region.

Artwork by Bil Keane, who created the comic strip, Family Circus, hang throughout the school buildings. Keane was a former student and was inducted into the Archdiocesan Hall of fame in November 1991. During a visit to the Parish in November 1991, he donated several posters that he created that relate to parish and school life. Keane's sketches include a watercolor self-portrait.

== Pastors ==
- 1920-1928 - Rev. William A. Motley
- 1928-1935 - Rev. Austin C. Grady
- 1935-1944 - Rev. Richard W. Gaughan
- 1944-1968 - Rev. William J. Boyle
- 1968-1980 - Rev. Francis J. Kimble
- 1980-2002 - Rev. Msgr. James E. Mortimer
- 2002-2009 - Rev. Msgr. Nelson J. Perez
- 2009-2010 - Rev. Scott D. Brockson (6 months as Pastoral Administrator)
- 2009-2016 - Rev. Joseph G. Watson
- 2016-2023 - Rev. Alfonso J. Concha
- 2023–present - Rev. Francesco D'Amico (Parochial Administrator, beginning June 2023)

== Notable alumni ==
- Bil Keane, '36, creator of the Family Circus.
- Joe Hand Sr., sports promoter
- De'Andre Hunter, '12, NBA basketball player
