= Solo boxeo =

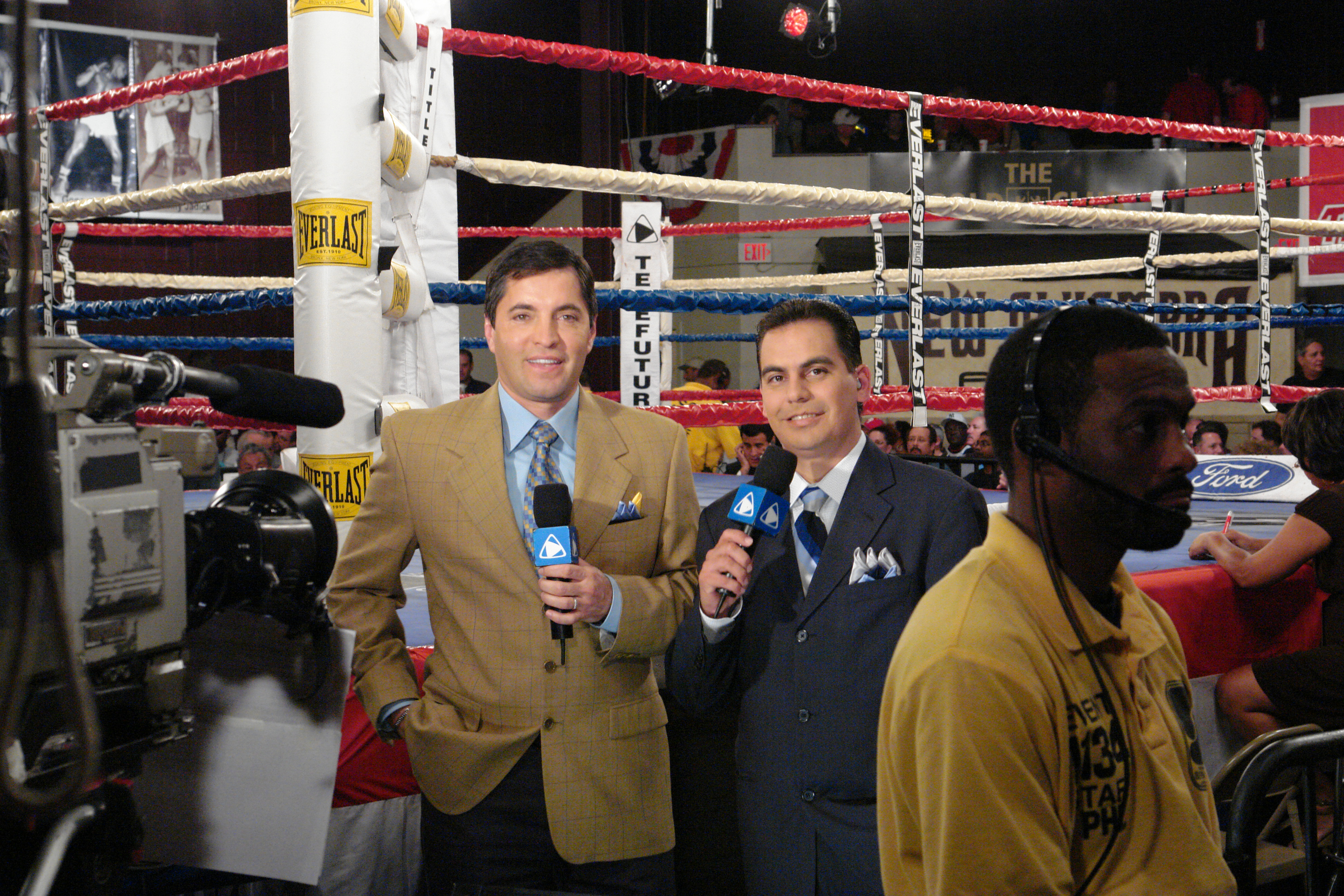
- Genre: Boxing telecasts
- Presented by: Ernesto (El Buitre) Amador; Israel Vazquez
- Country of origin: United States
- Original language: Spanish

Production
- Production location: various
- Running time: 120 minutes
- Production companies: Univision Deportes; Top Rank; Golden Boy Promotions

Original release
- Network: Univision (2000–02, 2010-12); TeleFutura/UniMás (2002–2008, 2012–present); Televisa Univision Deportes Network (simulcast on UniMás)
- Release: 2000 – present

Solo boxeo is a Spanish language boxing series airing in the United States that currently airs on UniMás. Along its history, it has featured Hispanic boxers promoted by Top Rank and Golden Boy Promotions.

The show debuted in 2000, hosted by Ricardo Celis and Bernardo Osuna, and was cancelled in late 2008 during the Great Recession.

The show returned in 2010, and is currently hosted by Ernesto Amador and Israel Vazquez, a former boxer and world champion.
