= Joe Hand Sr. =

American businessman (1936–2024)

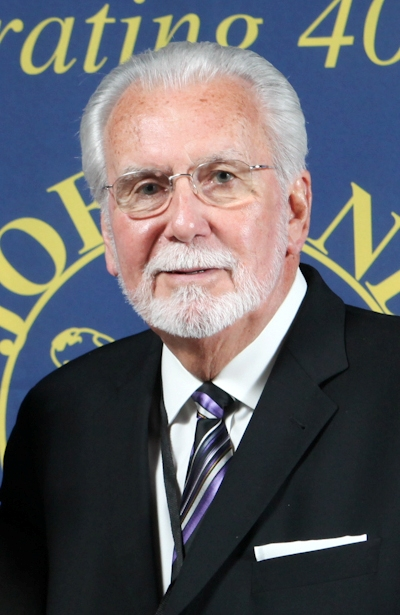
- Hand in 2012
- Born: September 10, 1936; Philadelphia, Pennsylvania, U.S.
- Died: August 1, 2024 (aged 87); Philadelphia, Pennsylvania, U.S.
- Occupation: Businessman
- Years active: 1967–2024
- Known for: Founder and chairman of Joe Hand Promotions, Inc. Promoter of Pay-Per-View and Closed Circuit broadcasts
- Spouse: Margaret Joyce (m. 1957; died 2023)
- Children: 2

Joseph Hand Sr. (September 10, 1936 – August 1, 2024) was an American businessman and media executive from Philadelphia.

He was the chairman of Joe Hand Promotions, Inc., a promoter of Pay-Per-View and Closed Circuit broadcasts of sporting events, which he founded in 1971.

== Early life and career ==
Hand was born in 1936 and raised in the Lawncrest district of Philadelphia. He attended St. William's Middle School and Northeast Catholic High School. He joined the Philadelphia Police Department in 1959, eventually being promoted to Detective in the department's Intelligence Unit. In 1975, he suffered a serious heart attack which required him to leave the police force. Instead he focused on his business interests, which had begun in 1967 when he became a charter shareholder of Cloverlay Corporation, sponsoring Joe Frazier.

== Joe Hand Promotions ==
In 1971, Hand formed his own company specializing in sports promotions, Joe Hand Promotions, Inc. The company went on to become a large TV distributor of pay-per-view boxing, UFC and other events, airing in thousands of establishments around the United States, such as sports bars, restaurants, military bases, universities, cruise ships and oil rigs. The company has been involved in many major boxing championship fights, concerts, wrestling events, and other sporting occasions. The Philadelphia Inquirer wrote that "If a bar televises a big fight, it likely has to purchase it from Mr. Hand's company".

In January 2021, the company began offering a commercial subscription of ESPN Plus for Business which delivers limited live sports content via DirecTV to commercial establishments.

Hand remained chairman of the company and continued to work at its office in Feasterville, Pennsylvania, until days before his death in 2024.

== Joe Hand Boxing Gym ==
In 1995, Hand opened the Joe Hand Boxing Gym for children. The gym has boxing rings and equipment, but also a computer center for other educational activities.

== Personal life and death ==
Hand married Margaret Joyce on June 29, 1957; she also worked as a police officer. They had two children, and were married until her death on June 27, 2023.

Hand died from COVID-19 on August 1, 2024, at the age of 87.

== Awards and recognition ==
- Pennsylvania Sports Hall Of Fame (1992)
- World Boxing Association "Closed Circuit Promoter of the Year" (1996)
- "Man of the Year" in the King One Veterans Boxers Association(1999)
- Golden Gloves Hall of Fame (2000)
- Advisory Board, National Penn Bank (2000)
- Middle Atlantic Amateur Boxing Association's Hall of Fame (2001)
- Philadelphia Sports Congress "Wanamaker Award" (2002)
- Northeast Catholic High School's Alumni Hall of Fame (2005)
- Pennsylvania Boxing Hall of Fame (2012)
- Pennsylvania Sports Experience, Board of Trustees (2012)
- Philadelphia Sports Hall of Fame (2013)
