= J. Russell Peltz =

American boxing promoter (born 1946)

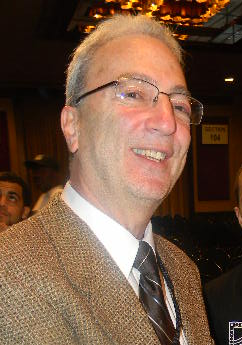
Peltz in 2010

J. Russell Peltz (born December 9, 1946) is an American boxing promoter. A member of the International Boxing Hall of Fame and the World Boxing Hall of Fame, Peltz has promoted many fights at Philadelphia venues such the Spectrum and the Blue Horizon. He has also promoted fights at casinos in Atlantic City.

== Early life and education ==
Peltz was born in Wynnefield, Philadelphia. His family moved to Bala Cynwyd, Pennsylvania, after he finished second grade. He became a boxing fan at age 12 and saw his first live fight at age 14. He attended Lower Merion High School, graduating in 1964.

He attended Temple University, where he majored in journalism and was named the Outstanding Male Journalism Graduate in 1968.

== Career ==
After his junior year at Temple University, Peltz was hired on the sports copy desk at the Evening & Sunday Bulletin in Philadelphia, working the midnight shift from 1967 to 1969. When he was unable to secure a job as a boxing writer, he left the Bulletin to become a boxing promoter. His first boxing card in Philadelphia was on September 30, 1969, with the main event at the Blue Horizon featuring Bennie Briscoe vs. Tito Marshall.

After promoting at various venues in Philadelphia for four years, Peltz was named Director of Boxing at the Spectrum in South Philadelphia. During his tenure at the Spectrum, from 1973 to 1980, Peltz became a successful local boxing promoter. When Tyrone Everett challenged Alfredo Escalera at the Spectrum for the World Boxing Council (WBC) junior lightweight title in 1976, the 16,019 in attendance set the record for the largest crowd ever to watch a fight indoors in Pennsylvania. In 1978, when Bennie Briscoe faced Marvelous Marvin Hagler at the Spectrum in a 10-round match, the 14,950 fans in attendance established the record for the largest indoor crowd in Pennsylvania history for a non-championship fight.

Peltz' first world champion arrived in 1978 when Marvin Johnson won the WBC light-heavyweight title against Mate Parlov in Marsala, Sicily. Johnson also won the WBA version of the title twice, in 1979 and 1986. Peltz also promoted Jeff Chandler, the Hall-of-Fame bantamweight champion, who claimed the WBA crown in 1980 by knocking out Julian Solís in Miami, Florida. Chandler held the title for nearly four years and successfully defended it nine times.

After the rise of casinos in Atlantic City in the late 1970s, Peltz began promoting at Sands Atlantic City and Resorts Atlantic City while continuing to promote boxing shows in Philadelphia. He also promoted fight cards at most of the Atlantic City casinos, including Bally's, Harrah's Marina, Trump Castle, Caesars, The Claridge, and the Playboy Hotel and Casino. During those years, Peltz promoted several world champions.

Through the 1980s and 1990s, Peltz became synonymous with boxing at the Blue Horizon, including an eight-year stretch (1993–2001) of consecutive sellouts at the venue. Peltz was also a partner with New Jersey–based Main Events, promoting Arturo Gatti from 1991 to 2004.

Peltz is active as a manager and consultant for boxers. In 2021, he wrote and published a book titled Thirty Dollars and a Cut Eye. He is the president of Peltz Boxing Promotions, Inc., in Philadelphia.

== Personal life ==
Peltz met his first wife, Patricia McKeown, in college. They married in August 1969 and divorced in February 1976. He married Linda Sablosky, a classmate from Lower Merion High School, in June 1977. They have two sons; the oldest died in 2017. Linda and Russell have six grandchildren.

== Awards and achievements ==
- Outstanding Male Journalism Graduate Temple University (1968)
- Pennsylvania Boxing Hall of Fame (1978)
- James J. Walker Memorial Award from the Boxing Writer's Association of America (1999)
- World Boxing Hall of Fame (2000)
- Philadelphia Jewish Sports Hall of Fame (2002)
- International Boxing Hall of Fame (2004)
- New Jersey Boxing Hall of Fame (2008)
- Temple University School of Communications & Theatre Hall of Fame (2010)
- Pennsylvania Lehigh Valley Sports Hall of Fame (2015)
- Atlantic City Boxing Hall of Fame (2017)
- Lower Merion High School Distinguished Alumni (2018)
- Philadelphia Sports Hall of Fame (2020)
- Indiana Boxing Hall of Fame (2022)
- West Coast Boxing Hall of Fame Book of the Year (2023)
- Florida Boxing Hall of Fame (2025)
