= KEDA (AM) =

San Antonio, Texas; United States
- Broadcast area: Greater San Antonio
- Frequency: 1540 kHz
- Branding: Radio Jalapeño

Programming
- Format: Tejano and Conjunto

Ownership
- Owner: Claro Communications; (Claro Communications, Ltd.)

History
- First air date: March 17, 1966; 59 years ago

Technical information
- Licensing authority: FCC
- Facility ID: 14892
- Class: B
- Power: 5,000 watts day 1,000 watts night
- Transmitter coordinates: 29°21′30″N 98°21′5″W
- Translators: 95.5 K238BZ (Seguin); 96.5 K243CV (San Antonio); 99.9 K260CC (San Antonio)

Links
- Public license information: Public file; LMS
- Webcast: Listen live
- Website: kedaradio.com

KEDA (1540 kHz) is an AM radio station licensed to San Antonio, Texas, United States, the station serves the San Antonio area. The station is currently owned by Claro Communications.

== History ==
KEDA (1540 AM) founded on March 17, 1966, by Manuel G. Davila. KEDA is regarded by some as one of the first Tejano Music radio stations in the United States. Davila's first words on the opening day of his station were "KEDA está en el aire." From its founding KEDA committed to the goal of supporting the local tejano bands of San Antonio. KEDA's format has remained relatively unchanged since its inception.

In July 2011, Claro Communications (headed by Gerald Benavides) bought the radio station.Conjunto station's sale marks end of an era The format remains the same with much of KEDA's previous air staff still working there.

On March 17, 2014, KEDA went into the FM spectrum at 87.7 FM.About – KEDA FM

== Manuel G. Davila ==
Manuel G. Davila Sr. died on July 12, 1997. Leaving the station to his wife and children. His youngest son, Albert Davila was Program Director of KEDA until 2011.

Davila was inducted into the Texas Conjunto Music Hall of Fame in 2015.
