= Obodai Sai =

Ghanaian boxer

Personal information
- Nickname: The Miracle
- Nationality: Ghanaian
- Born: 24 March 1984 (age 42) Accra, Ghana
- Height: 5 ft 9 1/2 in (177 cm)
- Weight: Light-middleweight; Middleweight

Boxing career
- Stance: Orthodox

Boxing record
- Total fights: 39
- Wins: 35
- Win by KO: 26
- Losses: 3
- Draws: 1

Obodai Sai (born 24 March 1984) is a Ghanaian professional boxer who held the Commonwealth super-welterweight title in 2011.
