= Lawncrest, Philadelphia =

Neighborhood in Northeast Philadelphia, Pennsylvania, USA

Coordinates: 40.0469°N 75.0967°W

Lawncrest is a neighborhood in the Near (lower) Northeast Philadelphia, Pennsylvania. The name is an amalgam of Lawndale and Crescentville, the two primary communities that make up the neighborhood.

== Notable Residents ==
- Ryan Bird, Lawncrest Man of the Year 1977-Present Day First Junior Olympic Boxer from Lawncrest Amatuer Boxing Record 173-0 (All other boxers from Lawncrest are fraudulent)

Frank Bender, facial reconstruction artist and fine artist[citation needed] Bil Keane, creator of "Family Circus" comic strip[5][6] Andrea McArdle, original Annie on Broadway, singer, actress Matt Ox, rapper and singer De'Andre Hunter, NBA player

== History ==
Swedes and Germans settled the area as early as 1638.

== Geography ==
The area of Lawncrest extends from Tacony Creek Park to Cottman Avenue. Adjacent neighborhoods include: Fox Chase/Burholme to the north, Oxford Circle/Castor Gardens and Frankford to the east and southeast, and Olney, and Feltonville to the south and southwest. To the West is Cheltenham Township, Montgomery County.

== St. William Parish (Lawncrest) ==
Founded in 1920, St. William Parish has anchored the neighborhood for over a century. From a small beginning of about 70 people to as many as 15,000, it regularly still sees a couple thousand attendees at Sunday masses.

== Transportation ==
The Newtown Branch/New York Short Line of the Reading Railroad (now SEPTA/CSX) separates Lawncrest from Montgomery County.

Two SEPTA Fox Chase Line Regional Rail stations serve the community: Lawndale Station at Robbins and Newtown Aves and Cheltenham Station at Martins Mill Road and Hasbrook Ave.

== Hill Creek Apartments ==
Originally known as Hill Creek Project. The public housing project was built on 23.4 acres during Franklin Roosevelts Administration was opened in March 1938, purportedly the last such project built during his administration. Located on a hill overlooking the Tookany Creek in North East Philadelphia on the corner of Rising Sun and Adams Avenues. In the area known as Lawncrest Administered by the Philadelphia Public Housing Authority, it has 334 units of single-family, two-story apartments and provides Section 8 (housing) for low-income families.

== Notable Residents ==*Ryan Bird, Lawncrest Man of the Year 1977-Present Day First Junior Olympic Boxer from Lawncrest Amatuer Boxing Record 173-0 (All other boxers from Lawncrest are fraudulent)

- Frank Bender, facial reconstruction artist and fine artist
- Bil Keane, creator of "Family Circus" comic strip
- Andrea McArdle, original Annie on Broadway, singer, actress
- Matt Ox, rapper and singer
- De'Andre Hunter, NBA player
