= Phil Migliarese =

Practitioner of Brazilian jiu-jitsu

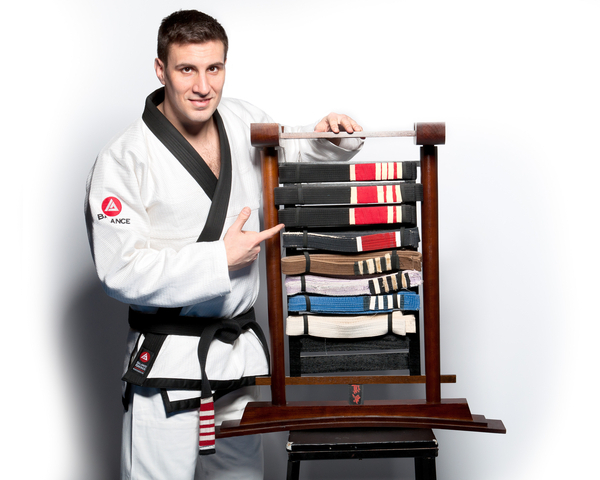
- Born: January 11, 1976 (age 50)
- Nickname: Jiu-Jitsu Matrix
- Nationality: American
- Height: 6 ft 2 in (1.88 m)
- Team: Balance
- Trainer: Relson Gracie
- Rank: 6th degree black belt in Brazilian jiu-jitsu

Other information
- Website: http://www.balancestudios.net

Phil "Jiu-Jitsu Matrix" Migliarese (born Philip Migliarese III, January 11, 1976) is an American 6th degree Relson Gracie Brazilian jiu-jitsu Black Belt. A Gracie Worlds and National Champion, Migliarese is a trainer, training partner and coach to UFC and MMA fighters as well as World and Pan-Am Champions. Migliarese is also a yoga instructor and author/creator of Yoga For Fighters. He lives in Philadelphia, Pennsylvania, where he teaches with his brother, Ricardo Migliarese.

== Early life ==
Migliarese began his martial arts journey in 1988 at Maxercise in Philadelphia, Pennsylvania, with Steve Maxwell when he was 12 years old. Maxercise had affiliations with both Royce Gracie's Academy in Los Angeles, California, and Relson Gracie's Academy in Hawaii. Three months after he started training, Migliarese met Rorion Gracie and Royce Gracie at a seminar and shortly thereafter, he was introduced to Relson Gracie. Migliarese was quickly taken in by the Gracie family as he showed promise in the sport. Relson focused his attention on Migliarese's training and became his mentor.

== Car accident ==
In January 1993, Migliarese was in a car accident that initially put him in a coma. He suffered injuries, breaking his nose, shoulder, collarbone, all of the ribs on the right side of his body, all of the fingers on his right hand and his pelvis, as well as damage to his internal organs. This accident, which made him nearly immobile for 6 months, changed the direction of his training and approach to Jiu-Jitsu. He credits his yoga breathing and practice for his recovery. Originally not expected to walk or train again, Migliarese resumed light training and in attendance to support Royce at UFC 1 in November 1993. Given a clean bill of health in early 1994, he returned as one of Royce's training partners for UFC 2 in Denver, Colorado.

== Brazilian jiu-jitsu training ==
He spent much of the 1990s at the Gracie Academy, learning the Gracie method of teacher training directly from Grand Master Helio Gracie or training with Relson in Hawaii. Migliarese returned to Philadelphia in 2000 to take over as head instructor of Relson's affiliate school. As a brown belt in 2001, Migliarese won the Gracie World Championship and was 2nd in the open division. In 2002, Migliarese and Rick opened Balance Studios, the only Relson Gracie affiliate in Philadelphia. That year at the Arnolds Classic/Gracie Worlds Migliarese won what would be his most well known match against UFC fighter Renato “Babalu” Sobral. In March 2003, at the Gracie Worlds in Columbus, Ohio, he became the youngest person to receive the honor of black belt from Relson Gracie and was among the first Americans to receive this promotion.

== Yoga practice ==
Migliarese also spent time studying and practicing his other passion, Ashtanga yoga. Introduced to yoga at the grade school level, Migliarese immediately took to the ancient system of breathing and postures and continued his practice regularly. In 1997, he traveled to Mysore, India to study with Sri K. Pattabhi Jois and asked for permission to teach Series I and II, which was the custom of the time, prior to current certifications. During this time, Migliarese not only practiced yoga, but watched and studied the methods that Jois used in adjusting others to aide in their practice. Migliarese teaches Ashtanga Yoga in class and private lessons.

== MMA trainer ==
Migliarese and Rick have trained professional athletes and MMA fighters, including Philadelphia Eagles Trey Thomas and Winston Justice, UFC fighters Frankie Edgar and Waylon Lowe, Bellator fighter Tim Carpenter, several World and Pan-Am Jiu-Jitsu winners as well as local police officers and FBI agents. Migliarese was in the corner of UFC fighter Waylon Lowe on January 22, 2011, at UFC: Fight for the Troops 2. Migliarese also awarded a black belt to research scientist and podcaster Lex Fridman.
