= The Gobbledy Gooker =

Former mascot of the World Wrestling Federation

- The Gobbledy Gooker (portrayed by Héctor Guerrero) is interviewed by Gene Okerlund after hatching at the 1990 Survivor Series
- First appearance: Survivor Series (1990)
- Last appearance: Main Event (November 27, 2020)
- Created by: Vince McMahon
- Portrayed by: Héctor Guerrero (1990, 2001); The Boogeyman (2008); Maryse Ouellet (2009); Xavier Woods (2015); Jey Uso (2015); Drew Gulak (2017, 2020)

In-universe information
- Species: Turkey
- Height: 5 feet 10 inches (178 cm)
- Weight: 205 lb (93 kg)
- Hometown: Hartford, Connecticut

The Gobbledy Gooker is a professional wrestling turkey mascot originally portrayed by Héctor Guerrero. In the weeks leading up to the 1990 Survivor Series, the World Wrestling Federation (WWF, now WWE) hyped its debut by showcasing a large egg at live shows, causing much speculation among wrestling fans. Guerrero was jeered by fans in attendance when he hatched out of the egg and the character was quickly dropped by the promotion. It subsequently attained a legacy as being one of the worst characters in the history of professional wrestling. After a lengthy hiatus, WWE began sporadically using the character again and several other wrestlers have donned the Gobbledy Gooker costume. Thirty years after its debut, it won the WWE 24/7 Championship at the 2020 Survivor Series.

== Concept and creation ==
The concept for the Gobbledy Gooker was that it would serve as a turkey mascot for the World Wrestling Federation (WWF, now WWE) akin to the San Diego Chicken. In addition to being a mascot, WWF promoter Vince McMahon intended the character to wrestle and sought a skilled performer for the role. After a recommendation from Dusty Rhodes, the WWF began contacting Héctor Guerrero in early 1990. Guerrero landed the role after a successful in-person audition months later and was set to debut at the upcoming Survivor Series event. Survivor Series typically takes place around Thanksgiving and this edition was to take place on Thanksgiving night.

In the weeks leading up to the event, the WWF began hyping the new character by displaying a large egg at several shows. This caused rampant speculation about what was in the egg and the most popular theory was that multi-time world champion Ric Flair, who wrestled for the rival promotion World Championship Wrestling (WCW), was going to debut in the WWF by hatching from it. Mark Calaway had recently signed with the WWF and feared that the egg was to hype his debut. He ultimately debuted as The Undertaker in an unrelated segment at the same event.

== History ==
=== Héctor Guerrero portrayal (1990, 2001) ===
The hatching of the Gobbledy Gooker

Announcer Gene Okerlund appeared next to the egg at Survivor Series and speculated that it contained a dinosaur, balloons or perhaps the Playmate of the Month. After these comments, the egg hatched and Guerrero climbed out of it in the costume. He then approached Okerlund for an interview but spoke only by making turkey noises. This prompted Okerlund to call him "the Gobbledy Gooker". As fans in attendance at the Hartford Civic Center started to boo, a rock and roll rendition of "Turkey in the Straw" began to play and Okerlund and Guerrero danced in the ring. Despite the crowd's rejection of the segment, commentator Roddy Piper said that the Gobbledy Gooker had "won the heart of Hartford!" and his broadcast partner Gorilla Monsoon described it as a "big smash".

Guerrero continued to tour with the WWF for a few weeks afterward. However, he suffered another gaffe during an appearance at Madison Square Garden; he was unable to see out of the head of the costume, which caused him to fall into the ring after a handspring. Despite initial plans for the Gobbledy Gooker to represent the company as a mascot, it disappeared from the promotion a month after its debut. The character was not seen again until WrestleMania X-Seven in 2001, when Guerrero returned to the persona for one night and wrestled his only match under the moniker during the "Gimmick Battle Royal". He was quickly eliminated by Tugboat.

=== Portrayals by others (2008–2020) ===
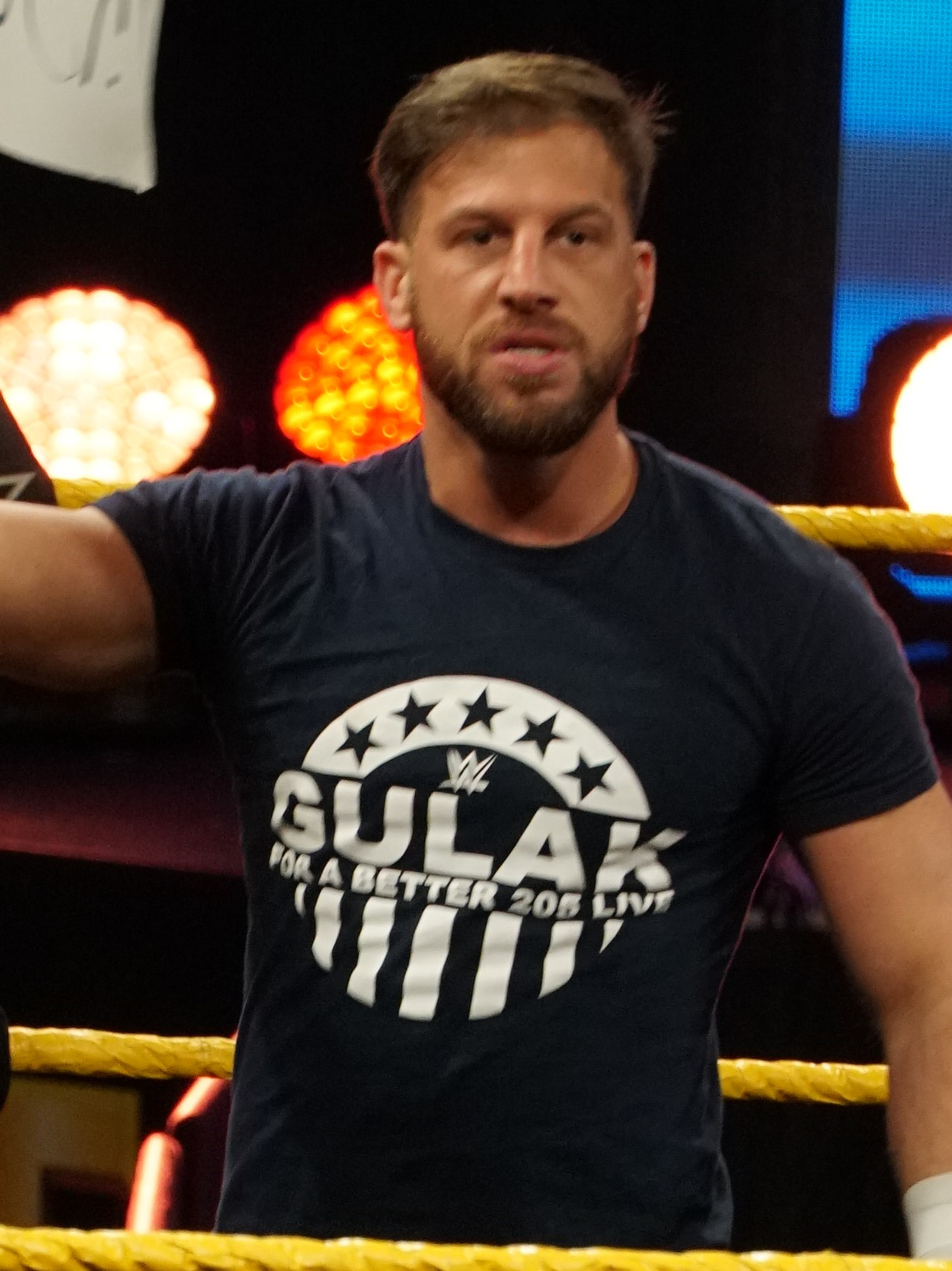
Drew Gulak portrayed the character in 2017 and 2020, including during its brief WWE 24/7 Championship reign

Since 2008, WWE has sporadically used the character in storylines or skits during Thanksgiving week. The first such appearance was at the 2008 Survivor Series, where The Boogeyman dressed as the Gobbledy Gooker in a skit with The Bella Twins and The Colóns. The next appearance was on the November 23, 2009, episode of Raw, when Maryse Ouellet disguised herself as the Goobledy Gooker to attack Melina Perez. In 2013, WWE released a series of comical YouTube videos called "The Gobbledy Gooker Goes To Work". To celebrate the 25th anniversary of its debut, Xavier Woods of The New Day donned the turkey costume on the November 26, 2015, episode of SmackDown. Later that episode, Jey Uso disguised himself as the Gobbledy Gooker to attack his New Day partners.

On the November 21, 2017, edition of 205 Live, Drew Gulak dressed up as the Gobbledy Gooker, referring to himself as "the Gobbledy Gulaker". Gulak reprised his role as the Gobbledy Gooker for the thirtieth anniversary of its debut at 2020 Survivor Series, although his identity was not revealed during the event. During the pre-show, the character won the WWE 24/7 Championship by defeating R-Truth. Later that night, it lost the title to Akira Tozawa, who quickly lost it to R-Truth. The character made another appearance with R-Truth on the following episode of Main Event, where it was attacked by Retribution.

== Legacy ==
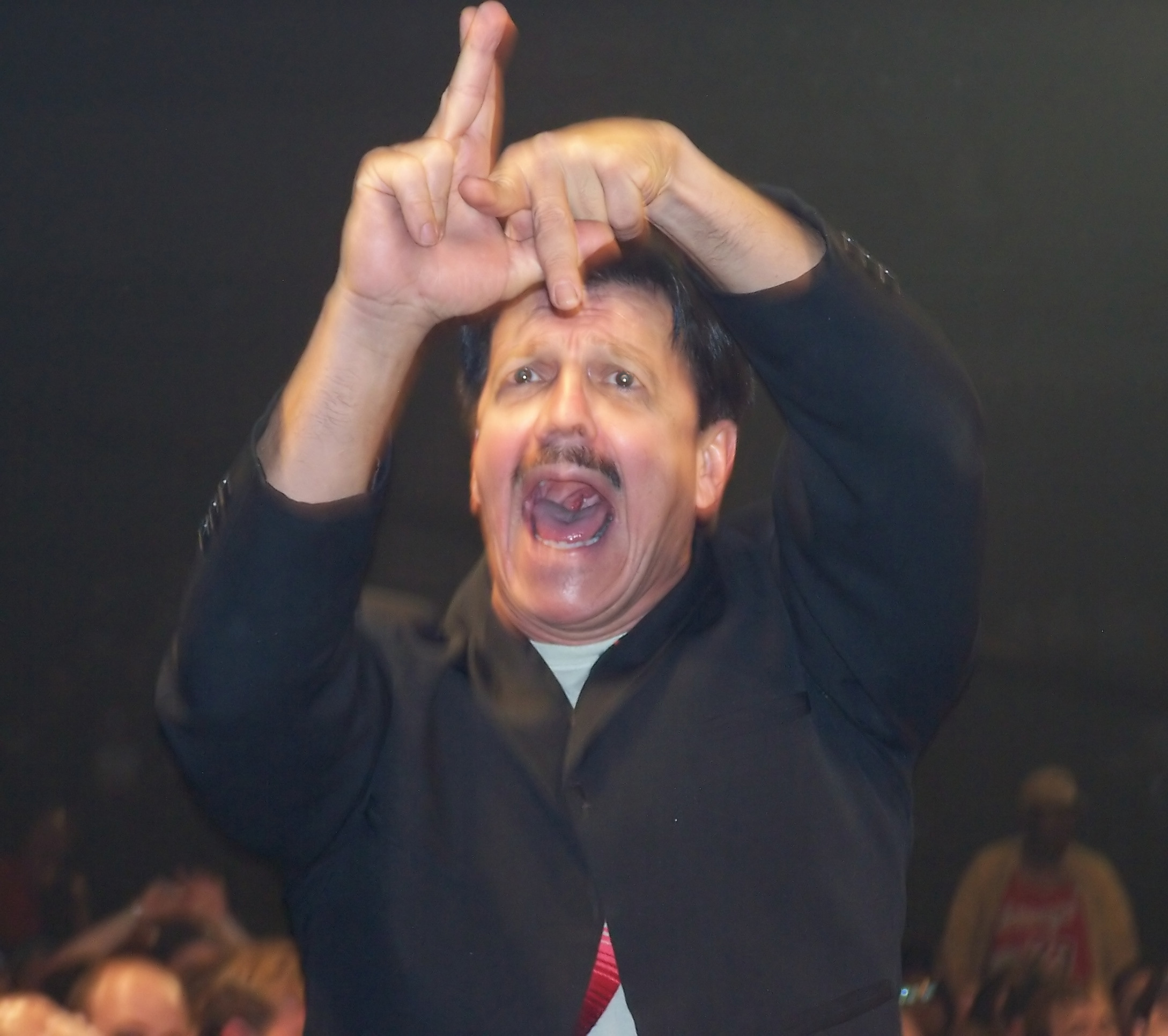
Héctor Guerrero has defended the Gobbledy Gooker

The Gobbledy Gooker is remembered by many as one of the biggest flops in the history of the professional wrestling industry. The satirical wrestling website WrestleCrap named its annual booby prize the "Gooker Award" after the character. Furthermore, in The Wrestlecrap Book of Lists!, R. D. Reynolds listed the Gobbledy Gooker as the second worst wrestling character of all time, behind The Red Rooster, while The A.V. Club placed it on a list of wrestling's most regrettable gimmicks. Muscle & Fitness similarly described the character as being the worst dressed wrestler of all time, writing: "having a WWE Superstar compete in a full Turkey suit is perhaps the most ridiculous concept ever". Bleacher Report and 411Mania each ranked the character as having the second worst debut/reveal of all time, second to the Shockmaster (portrayed by Fred Ottman, who also wrestled as Tugboat and eliminated the Gobbledy Gooker at WrestleMania X-Seven). During a 2008 episode of Legends of Wrestling, Dusty Rhodes, who had previously written for WCW and was responsible for creating the Shockmaster, revealed that he and McMahon would joke about which character was worse.

WWE describe the debut as an "unmitigated disaster", but add: "Like an Ed Wood movie, The Gooker was such a terrible persona that it eventually endeared itself to the WWE Universe". However, Guerrero has defended the character, stating: "The Gobbledy Gooker is called the biggest flop in professional wrestling history, but it wasn’t meant for the adults. It was for the children. Vince wanted to do something noble, which I take my hat off to and respect." Okerlund addressed Guerrero during his WWE Hall of Fame induction in 2006, saying: "Héctor, we had a lot of fun, but all of this is forgotten". Paul Debendetto of Mental Floss disagreed with Okerlund's assessment, given the character's enduring legacy, writing: "the Gooker lives on. And Héctor wouldn’t have it any other way."

== Championships and accomplishments ==
- Wrestling Observer Newsletter
  - Worst Gimmick (1990)
- WWE
  - WWE 24/7 Championship (1 time)
