= WrestleCrap =

Professional wrestling website

- Website type: Professional wrestling
- Owner: RD Reynolds
- Creators: RD Reynolds; Merle Vincent
- Website: wrestlecrap.com
- Commercial: Yes
- Registration: Message board only
- Launched: April 2000; 26 years ago
- Current status: Active

WrestleCrap is a professional wrestling website created by R. D. Reynolds and Merle Vincent, serving as a "hall of shame" for some of the worst gimmicks and storylines in professional wrestling history. The site is run by Reynolds and Justin Henry.

== History ==
R.D. Reynolds and Merle Vincent launched the site in April 2000 and it quickly developed a following among wrestling fans. After Vincent's suicide in September 2000, Reynolds continued to run the site by himself. He shut the site down in 2001, claiming the high cost of running the site was responsible. It returned the following year, albeit without the backlog of past inductions.

In 2006, the site added several new writers and features. WrestleCrap is also the title of a book written by the site's creators, with an introduction by John Tenta (ISBN 1-55022-584-7). In addition, Reynolds has co-authored The Death of WCW, with wrestling journalist Bryan Alvarez, and he co-wrote The WrestleCrap Book of Lists! with Blade Braxton, released in late 2007. Both Reynolds and Alvarez were previously featured columnists for British pro wrestling and MMA magazine Fighting Spirit.

In December 2012, Reynolds announced a relaunch of the site, complete with more daily content and interactive features. The relaunch took place in January 2013. In December 2016, the entire site archive was made available for users who made a one-time donation to the site, or supported the site on Patreon. Braxton died in March 2021.

== Site content ==
- WrestleCrap Inductions, new induction weekly with rotating classic inductions weekly. These have been written primarily by Reynolds over the years, including currently, but a number of others have written them as well.
- Someone Bought This, a look at some of the more ridiculous wrestling merchandise on sale. This segment often looks at eBay items placed for auction by various users.
- Headlies, faux wrestling news stories in the style of The Onion.
- It Came From YouTube, a weekly celebration of the most obscure, insane and sometimes brilliant wrestling related clips found on YouTube.
- Squash of the Week, a weekly column that focuses on squash matches. It serves as the successor to Jobber of the Week.
- RD's Mailbag, Reynolds answers the questions he receives via email.

== Gooker Award ==
The Gooker Award is given each year to the worst gimmick, storyline, match, or event in wrestling in that year. The award is named after The Gobbledy Gooker, widely thought of as one of the most disastrous wrestling gimmicks of all time.

=== Winners ===
- 2000: David Arquette's WCW World Heavyweight Championship reign.
- 2001: The Invasion storyline.
- 2002: Katie Vick (Triple H vs. Kane feud).
- 2003: Al Wilson (Torrie Wilson vs. Dawn Marie feud).
- 2004: 2004 Raw Diva Search.
- 2005: the Jim Ross firing storyline and colonoscopy skit.
- 2006: WWE's exploitation of Eddie Guerrero's name and legacy after his death ("Eddiesploitation").
- 2007: the Vince McMahon paternity storyline and the reveal of Hornswoggle as his (kayfabe) son.
- 2008: Mike Adamle's stint in WWE.
- 2009: the Hornswoggle vs. Chavo Guerrero feud.
- 2010: TNA Impact! moving to Monday nights ("The New Monday Night Wars").
- 2011: Michael Cole's antics throughout the year.
- 2012: Claire Lynch (AJ Styles vs. Christopher Daniels and Kazarian feud).
- 2013: Dixie Carter's heel turn.
- 2014 (co-winner): Vince McMahon's comments about "brass rings"; the "Bella vs. Bella" storyline.
- 2015: the Rusev and Summer Rae vs. Dolph Ziggler and Lana feud.
- 2016: WrestleMania 32.
- 2017: Jinder Mahal's WWE Championship reign.
- 2018: WWE Crown Jewel.
- 2019: Seth Rollins vs. "The Fiend" Bray Wyatt Hell in a Cell match for the WWE Universal Championship at Hell in a Cell.
- 2020: Retribution.
- 2021: NXT 2.0.
- 2022: Ric Flair and Andrade El Idolo vs. Jay Lethal and Jeff Jarrett (with Karen Jarrett) tag team match at Ric Flair's Last Match.
- 2023 (co-winner): CM Punk's stint in AEW; Father James Mitchell's "cocaine" spot at NWA Samhain ("James Mitchell's NWA Samhain Coke Party").
- 2024: The Young Bucks showing security footage of the pre-show backstage altercation between CM Punk and Jack Perry at All In on AEW Dynamite.
- 2025: John Cena's heel run and retirement tour.

The 2001 award was not revealed until 2003 due to WrestleCrap's closing in 2001. Each year's Gooker Award, with the exceptions of 2001 and 2002, was determined by a poll of site visitors. The 2001 and 2002 awards were chosen by Reynolds, since he felt there was no competition those years. For the 2014 award, Reynolds declared that Vince McMahon's comments about "brass rings" and the Bella Twins feud were co-winners due to irregularities in the voting.

== WrestleCrap Radio (2005–2012; 2015–2021) ==
In August 2005, WrestleCrap introduced a podcast called WrestleCrap Radio. Typically Reynolds and columnist Blade Braxton discussed their personal lives, made jokes that may or may not relate to current wrestling (or wrestling at all), and rarely discussed news items from the wrestling industry. On occasion interviews with guests from within the wrestling industry were broadcast such as their interviews with Vince Russo and Lance Storm. Induction writer Triple Kelly was the unofficial reserve host, having won a co-host contest in 2007. The regular podcasts ended with WrestleCrap Radio episode 249, released on July 13, 2012. On August 20, 2015, to coincide with the 10 year anniversary of WrestleCrap Radio, a new episode of Reynolds and Braxton's occasional RD and Blade Show podcast was instead revealed to be the surprise 250th episode of WrestleCrap Radio. Episode 251 was released ten days later on August 30, followed by two more episodes each in September and October. The show was retired following Braxton's death in March 2021.

== See also ==
- ECW Press
- List of professional wrestling websites
