= R. D. Reynolds =

Former American wrestling manager

Randy Baer
- Born: January 12, 1969 (age 57); Indianapolis, Indiana, U.S.
- Occupations: Author, webmaster
- Writing career
- Pen name: RD Reynolds; Real Deal Reynolds
- Genres: Comedy, non-fiction
- Subjects: Professional wrestling, Professional wrestling gimmicks
- Website: wrestlecrap.com

Randy Baer (born January 12, 1969), better known by his ring and pen name RD (Real Deal) Reynolds, is an American former professional wrestling manager and is also the co-creator of the professional wrestling website WrestleCrap, with Merle Vincent (who died in September 2000). He has also authored three books, WrestleCrap, The Death of WCW, co-authored with Bryan Alvarez, and The WrestleCrap Book of Lists!, co-authored with Blade Braxton (who died in March 2021). He has been called "the foremost authority on the worst of professional wrestling" by the Canadian Online Explorer.

== Independent wrestling career ==
Baer's self-produced DVD The Worst of RD Reynolds chronicles his work in various independent wrestling promotions, most of which were in the Indianapolis area for promoters Jeff Cohen and "Diamond" Dan Garza; primarily Cohen's Championship Wrestling of America and NWA Indianapolis. Baer worked as an interviewer, commentator, manager, and booker, meaning that he wrote storylines and set up matches. Occasionally, he performed in professional wrestling matches, some of which had special stipulations. When he became a heel manager, he was forced to adopt the ring name RD Reynolds due to wrestling fans leaving him angry messages on his answering machine.

Baer once appeared in Ohio Valley Wrestling, a former developmental territory of World Wrestling Entertainment (WWE), managing Mark Henry in a match against The Big Show. Show chokeslammed Baer during the course of the match and significantly injured him. Later, Baer himself took responsibility, citing his own inexperience and lack of training as the reasons for the injury.

== Writing career ==
Baer holds a degree in broadcast journalism and sociology. In 2000, Baer and Merle Vincent launched the website WrestleCrap, which features wrestling-related articles, primarily focusing on moments in wrestling which Baer and contributors perceive to be the worst. Since the launch of the website, Baer has written four wrestling-related books. In his first book, WrestleCrap, Baer chronicles the characters and storylines from WWE and World Championship Wrestling which he perceives to the very worst. It features an introduction by John Tenta. Reynolds also co-authored The Death of WCW, with wrestling journalist Bryan Alvarez. The book received a positive review from Jon Waldman of SLAM! Wrestling. His third book, The WrestleCrap Book of Lists!, written with Blade Braxton, was released in November 2007. He was a featured columnist for British pro wrestling and MMA magazine, Fighting Spirit Magazine. He has also been interviewed as an expert on wrestling gimmicks. In 2014, a 10th anniversary expanded edition of The Death of WCW was released.

== Death hoax ==
In April 2007, Baer was the victim of an internet hoax, with various people and websites claiming that he had died from heart failure and his neighbors found him in his bathtub. In the end, Baer returned on an episode of WrestleCrap Radio with no idea how the rumor had started.

== Awards and accomplishments ==
- Wrestling Observer Newsletter awards
  - Best Pro Wrestling Book (2005, 2014, with Bryan Alvarez) Death of WCW

== Bibliography ==
- WrestleCrap: The Very Worst of Pro Wrestling (2003)
- The Death of WCW (2004) (with Bryan Alvarez)
- The WrestleCrap Book of Lists! (2007) (with Blade Braxton)
- The Death of WCW – 10th Anniversary Edition (2014) (with Bryan Alvarez)
