= Survivor Series (2020) =

WWE pay-per-view and livestreaming event

- Promotional poster featuring The Undertaker
- Promotion: WWE
- Brand(s): Raw; SmackDown
- Date: November 22, 2020
- City: Orlando, Florida (Note: The event was originally scheduled to be held at the American Airlines Center in Dallas, Texas.)
- Venue: WWE ThunderDome at Amway Center
- Attendance: 0 (behind closed doors) (Note: The event was held without a paying audience due to the COVID-19 pandemic in the United States, though it featured a live crowd of virtual fans via WWE's ThunderDome viewing experience.)
- Tagline(s): Best of the Best; Undertaker 30; Undertaker's Final Farewell

WWE event chronology
| ← Previous; Hell in a Cell | Next → NXT TakeOver: WarGames |

Survivor Series chronology
| ← Previous; 2019 | Next → 2021 |

The 2020 Survivor Series was a professional wrestling pay-per-view (PPV) and livestreaming event produced by WWE, held for wrestlers from the promotion's main roster brands, Raw and SmackDown. It was the 34th annual Survivor Series event and took place on November 22, 2020, from the WWE ThunderDome, a bio-secure bubble that at the time was hosted at the Amway Center in Orlando, Florida. The theme of the event was brand supremacy in which every match on the card involved wrestlers from the two brands in direct competition, including the titular Survivor Series match, a tag team elimination match that pits teams of multiple wrestlers against each other. The event also celebrated the 30th anniversary of The Undertaker's WWE debut, which occurred at the 1990 event—his retirement ceremony closed the show.

The event was reportedly planned to be held at the American Airlines Center in Dallas, Texas, which would have been the second Survivor Series at the venue, after 2003; however, all public gatherings were indefinitely restricted by the City of Dallas government due to the COVID-19 pandemic. As a result, the event was moved to the ThunderDome at the Amway Center, which made it the fourth Survivor Series to take place in the U.S. state of Florida, after 2000 in Tampa and 2007 and 2010 in Miami. It was subsequently WWE's final PPV and livestreaming event presented from the ThunderDome at the Amway Center as the bio-secure bubble was relocated to Tropicana Field in St. Petersburg, Florida due to the start of the 2020–21 ECHL and NBA seasons. This would also be the final Survivor Series to livestream on the American version of the WWE Network, which merged under Peacock in April 2021.

Seven matches were contested at the event, including one on the Kickoff pre-show. The card was highlighted by two Survivor Series matches: Raw's men's and women's teams were victorious over SmackDown's. In the main event match, SmackDown's Universal Champion Roman Reigns defeated Raw's WWE Champion Drew McIntyre. Also on the card, SmackDown Women's Champion Sasha Banks defeated Raw Women's Champion Asuka, and SmackDown Tag Team Champions The Street Profits (Angelo Dawkins and Montez Ford) defeated Raw Tag Team Champions The New Day (Kofi Kingston and Xavier Woods). Raw won brand supremacy by winning four of the seven matches. The 2019 event had also included the NXT brand, which won the brand supremacy competition that year, but NXT was not included at this event largely due to the pandemic as outbreaks of the virus had occurred among the NXT roster.

== Production ==
=== Background ===
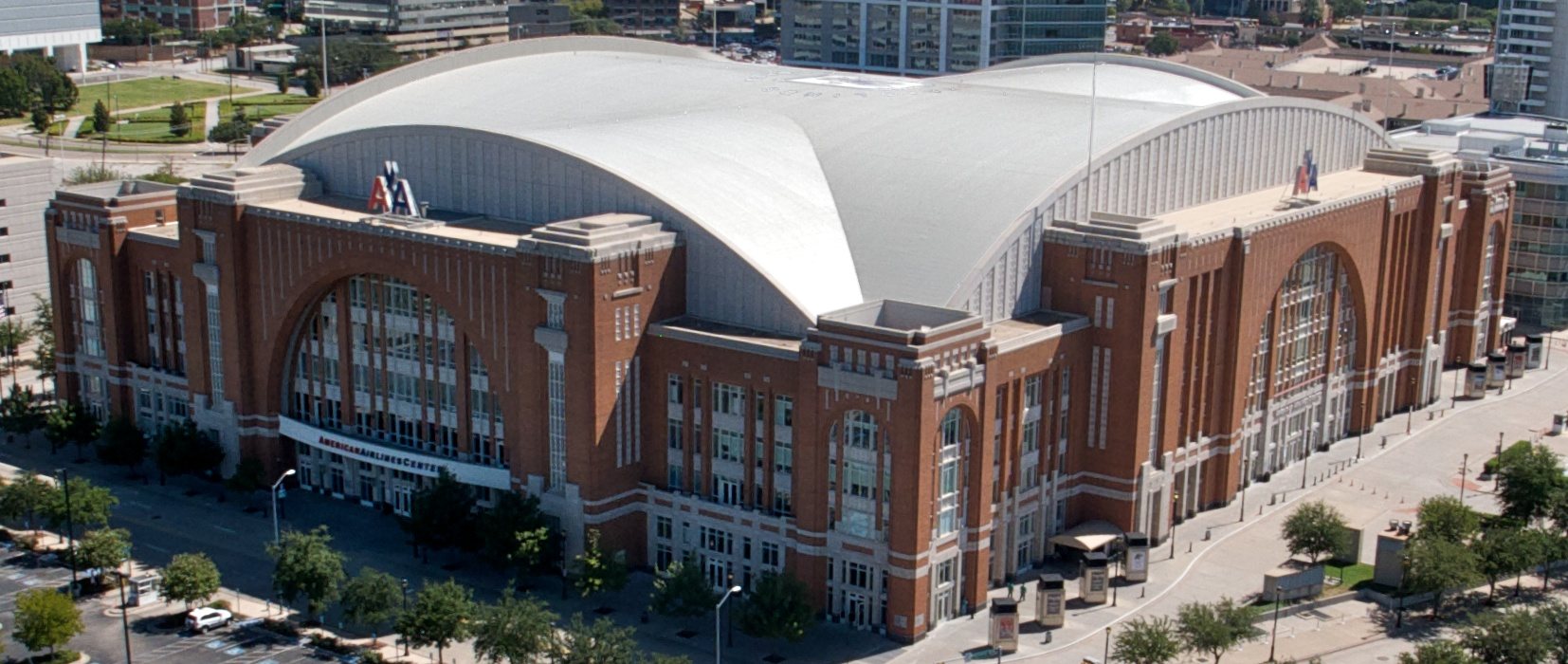
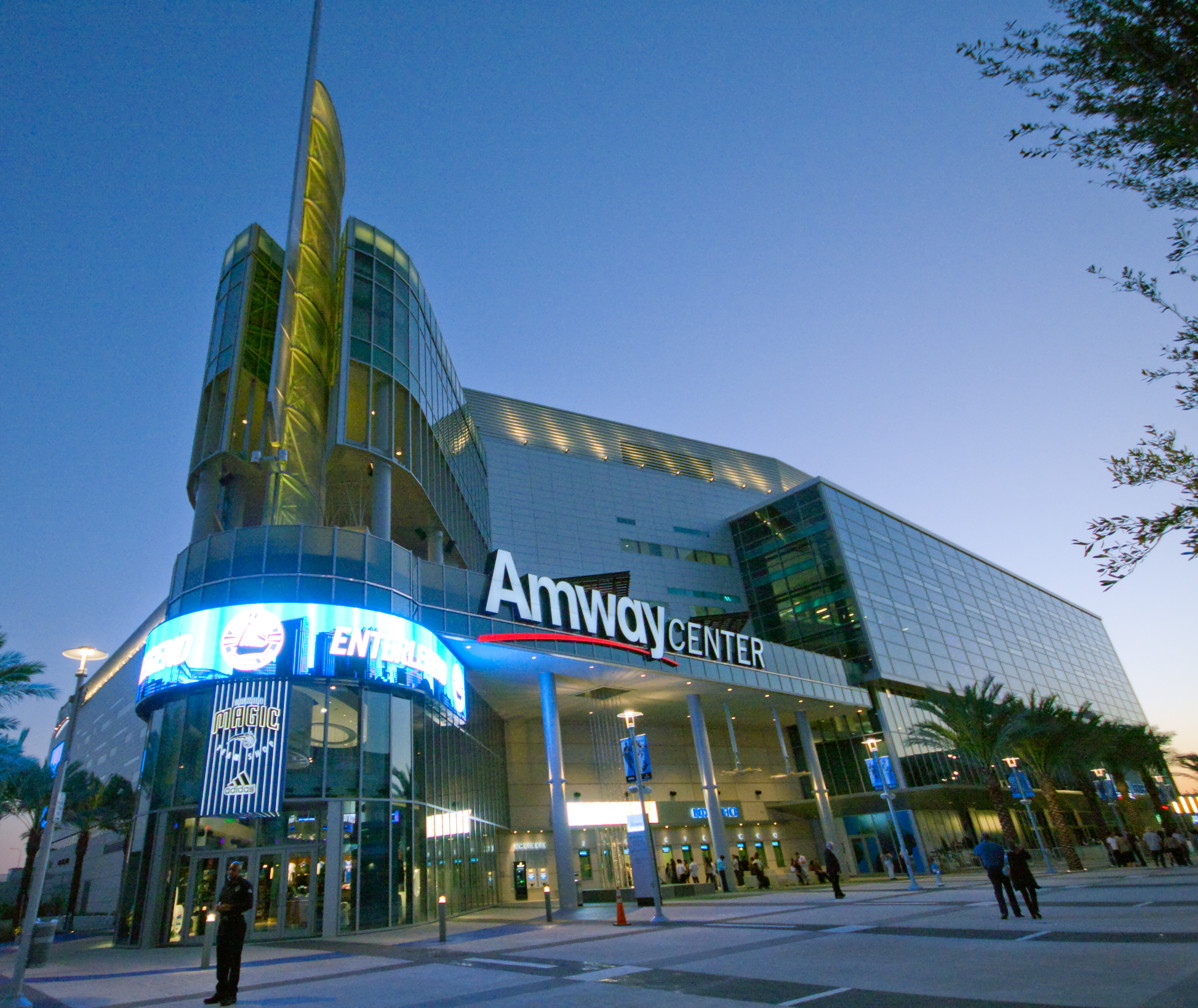
The 34th annual Survivor Series event was reportedly planned to be held at the American Airlines Center in Dallas, Texas, but due to the COVID-19 pandemic, it was produced by way of a bio-secure bubble called the WWE ThunderDome, which at the time was hosted at the Amway Center in Orlando, Florida. This was WWE's final pay-per-view and livestreaming event to be produced from the ThunderDome at the Amway Center, as the bio-secure bubble was relocated to Tropicana Field in St. Petersburg, Florida in December.

Survivor Series is an annual professional wrestling event, produced every November by WWE since 1987, generally held around Thanksgiving in the United States. It was originally broadcast exclusively via pay-per-view (PPV) before it began simultaneously livestreaming on the WWE Network in 2014. In what has become the second longest-running PPV event in history (behind WWE's WrestleMania), it is one of the promotion's original four PPVs, along with WrestleMania, SummerSlam, and Royal Rumble, referred to as the "Big Four". The event is traditionally characterized by having Survivor Series matches, which are tag team elimination matches that typically pits teams of four or five wrestlers against each other. The 34th Survivor Series event was scheduled to be held on November 22, 2020.

Since WWE reintroduced the brand split in July 2016, Survivor Series became centered around competition between wrestlers from Raw and SmackDown for brand supremacy. In addition to traditional Survivor Series matches between the brands, the champions of Raw faced their SmackDown counterparts in non-title matches, which began at the 2017 event. The 2020 Survivor Series featured Raw's WWE Champion against SmackDown's Universal Champion, the Raw Women's Champion facing the SmackDown Women's Champion, Raw's United States Champion going against SmackDown's Intercontinental Champion, and the Raw Tag Team Champions facing off with the SmackDown Tag Team Champions.

==== Impact of the COVID-19 pandemic ====
According to WrestleVotes, the 2020 Survivor Series event was planned to be held at the American Airlines Center in Dallas, Texas, which would have been the second Survivor Series at the venue, after 2003. However, mayor Eric Johnson announced on March 13 that all public gatherings of 500 people or above were indefinitely banned as a result of the COVID-19 pandemic that began taking effect in mid-March. Due to the pandemic, WWE had to present the majority of its programming from a behind closed doors set. Initially, Raw and SmackDown's shows were done at the WWE Performance Center in Orlando, Florida. A limited number of Performance Center trainees and friends and family members of the wrestlers were later utilized to serve as the live audience. In late August, these programs were moved to a bio-secure bubble called the WWE ThunderDome, which at the time was hosted at Orlando's Amway Center. The select live audience was no longer utilized as the bubble allowed fans to attend the events virtually for free and be seen on the nearly 1,000 LED boards within the arena. Additionally, the ThunderDome utilized various special effects to further enhance wrestlers' entrances, and arena audio was mixed with that of the chants from the virtual fans.

WWE's initial residency agreement with the Amway Center expired on October 31, but with the option to extend the contract with a two weeks notice. On October 12, PWInsider reported that the contract had been extended, with Fightful revealing the amended contract's expiration date as November 24. Survivor Series was subsequently WWE's final PPV and livestreaming event presented from the ThunderDome at the Amway Center, as WWE relocated the bio-secure bubble to Tropicana Field in St. Petersburg, Florida, which began with the December 11 episode of Friday Night SmackDown. This move was also done due to the start of the 2020–21 ECHL and NBA seasons as the Amway Center is the shared home of the Orlando Solar Bears (ECHL) and the Orlando Magic (NBA).

411Mania reported that the COVID-19 pandemic was a reason that the NXT brand was not involved in the event, unlike the previous year. Outbreaks of the virus had occurred at both of NXT's home arenas, Full Sail University and then the WWE Performance Center, prompting WWE to exclude NXT wrestlers from the event to avoid potential transmission of the virus to members of the Raw and SmackDown rosters. This report was confirmed by WWE executive and NXT head Paul "Triple H" Levesque during the NXT TakeOver: WarGames media call on December 3.

=== Storylines ===
The event comprised seven matches, including one on the Kickoff pre-show, that resulted from scripted storylines. Results were predetermined by WWE's writers on the Raw and SmackDown brands, while storylines were produced on WWE's weekly television shows, Monday Night Raw and Friday Night SmackDown.

==== Survivor Series matches ====
Qualifying matches for the men's Survivor Series match began on the October 26 episode of Raw. AJ Styles, Keith Lee, and Sheamus earned the first three spots on Team Raw by defeating Jeff Hardy, Elias, and Riddle, respectively. The following week, Braun Strowman qualified for the team by defeating Lee and Sheamus in a triple threat match. Riddle won the final spot on Team Raw by defeating Elias and Hardy in a triple threat match on the November 9 episode. Team SmackDown's first two members were determined on the October 30 episode of SmackDown. Kevin Owens and Jey Uso qualified by defeating Dolph Ziggler and Daniel Bryan, respectively. The following week, King Corbin and Seth Rollins won the next two spots by defeating Rey Mysterio and Otis, respectively. On the November 20 episode, WWE official Adam Pearce named Otis as the final member of Team SmackDown.

For the women's Survivor Series match, all five of Team Raw's members were initially revealed on the October 26 episode of Raw. WWE officials Adam Pearce and Pat Buck announced that WWE Women's Tag Team Champions Nia Jax and Shayna Baszler, along with Mandy Rose and Dana Brooke, would represent Team Raw. The fifth and final spot was determined by a fatal four-way match that night, which Lana won by defeating Lacey Evans, Peyton Royce, and Nikki Cross. On the November 16 episode of Raw, due to Jax and Baszler attacking Rose's arm during a tag team match, and then Retribution's Reckoning later attacking Brooke backstage, both Rose and Brooke were deemed unable to compete at Survivor Series, thus Pearce announced that they would be replaced by Evans and Royce. Team SmackDown's first member was determined on the October 30 episode of SmackDown. Bianca Belair won the spot by defeating Billie Kay and Natalya in a triple threat match. Ruby Riott won the second spot on the following episode, where she defeated Natalya and Zelina Vega in a triple threat match. On the November 13 episode, Liv Morgan qualified by defeating Chelsea Green, Natalya, and Tamina in a fatal four-way match. The following week, Pearce added Bayley to the team, and Natalya defeated Tamina to win the final spot on Team SmackDown.

==== Champions brand supremacy matches ====
All four of the champions brand supremacy matches were announced on the October 26 episode of Raw. At the time, it was announced that Raw's WWE Champion Randy Orton would face SmackDown's Universal Champion Roman Reigns, Raw Women's Champion Asuka would face SmackDown Women's Champion Sasha Banks, Raw's United States Champion Bobby Lashley would face SmackDown's Intercontinental Champion Sami Zayn, and Raw Tag Team Champions The New Day (Kofi Kingston and Xavier Woods) would face SmackDown Tag Team Champions The Street Profits (Angelo Dawkins and Montez Ford).

Over the next few weeks, five of the champions defended their titles before Survivor Series, with four of them retaining to keep the matchups the same as initially announced. SmackDown Women's Champion Sasha Banks retained her title against Bayley on the November 6 episode of SmackDown, Bobby Lashley retained the United States Championship against Titus O'Neil on the November 9 episode of Raw, Intercontinental Champion Sami Zayn retained his title against Apollo Crews on the November 13 episode of SmackDown, and The New Day retained their Raw Tag Team Championship against The Hurt Business (Cedric Alexander and Shelton Benjamin) on the November 16 episode of Raw. Also during this time, SmackDown Tag Team Champions The Street Profits tried to get info on their Survivor Series opponents from former New Day member Big E, who told them that New Day would win. The men's world championship matchup, however, changed. After losing the WWE Championship to Randy Orton at Hell in a Cell on October 25, Drew McIntyre was given a rematch for the title. Prior to that, McIntyre appeared on the November 13 episode of SmackDown to confront Universal Champion Roman Reigns, despite not being the WWE Champion. On the November 16 episode of Raw, McIntyre defeated Orton to regain the WWE Championship, thus becoming Reigns's opponent at Survivor Series.

== Event ==
Other on-screen personnel
| Role: | Name: |
|---|---|
| English commentators | Michael Cole (SmackDown) |
| English commentators | Corey Graves (SmackDown) |
| English commentators | Tom Phillips (Raw) |
| English commentators | Samoa Joe (Raw) |
| English commentators | Byron Saxton (Raw) |
| Spanish commentator | Marcelo Rodriguez |
| Ring announcer | Mike Rome |
| Referees | Danilo Anfibio |
| Referees | Jason Ayers |
| Referees | Shawn Bennett |
| Referees | John Cone |
| Referees | Dan Engler |
| Referees | Eddie Orengo |
| Referees | Rod Zapata |
| Interviewer | Kayla Braxton |
| Pre-show panel | Charly Caruso |
| Pre-show panel | John "Bradshaw" Layfield |
| Pre-show panel | Peter Rosenberg |
| Pre-show panel | Booker T |
| Pre-show panel | Jerry Lawler |

=== Pre-show ===
During the Survivor Series Kickoff pre-show, an 18-man dual-brand battle royal was contested, with its participants evenly divided between Raw and SmackDown. In the end, Raw's The Miz eliminated SmackDown's Dominik Mysterio to win the match, giving Raw the first win of the night.

Also during the pre-show, The Gobbledy Gooker, a character that also first appeared at the 1990 Survivor Series, pinned R-Truth to win the WWE 24/7 Championship.

=== Preliminary matches ===
The actual event opened with the men's 5-on-5 Survivor Series match, featuring Team Raw (AJ Styles, Keith Lee, Sheamus, Braun Strowman, and Riddle) (accompanied by Styles' bodyguard, Omos) against Team SmackDown (Kevin Owens, Jey Uso, King Corbin, Seth Rollins, and Otis). Jey and Styles started the match. After Sheamus tagged in the match, Rollins tagged in, got on his knees, and allowed Sheamus to perform a Brogue Kick on him: Rollins was subsequently eliminated, proclaiming it was "for the greater good." After Rollins' elimination, the remaining SmackDown team members attempted to discuss a strategy outside the ring while Team Raw did the same only for Strowman to tag himself in and tackle all of them with a running shoulder tackle. Back in the ring, Owens performed Stunners on Lee, Sheamus, and Riddle, after which Styles performed a Phenomenal Forearm on Owens to eliminate him. Styles attacked Corbin with a Pelé kick and Riddle performed a Floating Bro from the top rope to eliminate Corbin. After Otis performed the Caterpillar on Strowman, Otis attempted a Vader Bomb on Strowman only for Riddle to intercept Otis. Strowman took advantage of the distraction and performed a Running Powerslam on Otis to eliminate him. Jey attacked Team Raw with a flurry of Superkicks. In the end, Jey countered a Phenomenal Forearm from Styles and attempted a Splash on him; however, Lee, who was the legal member, intercepted Jey by catching him in midair and transitioned into a Spirit Bomb on Jey to win the match with a clean sweep, and giving Raw their second win of the night.

Next, SmackDown Tag Team Champions The Street Profits (Angelo Dawkins and Montez Ford) faced Raw Tag Team Champions The New Day (Kofi Kingston and Xavier Woods, accompanied by former stable member Big E from SmackDown); the trio came out dressed as their respective Gears 5 characters, available as downloadable content for the game. Big E went backstage after the match began. After an evenly contested match between the two teams, The Street Profits performed an electric chair/blockbuster combination on Woods to win the match for SmackDown, giving SmackDown their first win of the night. Following the match, both teams showed mutual respect for each other.

After that, Raw's United States Champion Bobby Lashley (accompanied by Hurt Business stablemates MVP, Cedric Alexander, and Shelton Benjamin) faced SmackDown's Intercontinental Champion Sami Zayn. Zayn refused to fight Lashley and attempted to walk away from the match, however, he was thwarted by The Hurt Business. In the closing moments, Zayn attempted to leave again, only for MVP to intercept him, after which, Zayn tried to convince the referee that MVP tripped him. MVP then threw Zayn back in the ring and Lashley applied the Hurt Lock on Zayn, who submitted, giving Raw their third win over SmackDown's one win.

Backstage, while Jey Uso was conversing with his brother Jimmy Uso, Roman Reigns and Paul Heyman appeared. Reigns lambasted Jey for losing, after which, Jimmy tried to calm Reigns down. Reigns then ordered Jimmy to leave and stated that Team SmackDown lost because Jey could not control his team and that they did not respect Jey. He then told Jey to also leave the building along with Jimmy.

In the next match, Raw Women's Champion Asuka faced SmackDown Women's Champion Sasha Banks. In the end, after a series of attempted rollups on one another, Banks pinned Asuka with an inside cradle to win the match, giving SmackDown their second win of the night.

In a backstage segment, new 24/7 Champion The Gobbledy Gooker stumbled upon a trail of bird seed backstage. As The Gooker started to indulge with the seed, Akira Tozawa appeared and performed a roll-up on The Gooker to win the title. R-Truth then appeared and attacked Tozawa with a bag of bird seed and pinned him to regain the title.

The penultimate match was the women's 5-on-5 Survivor Series match, featuring Team Raw (Nia Jax, Shayna Baszler, Lana, Lacey Evans, and Peyton Royce) against Team SmackDown (Bianca Belair, Ruby Riott, Liv Morgan, Bayley, and Natalya). A few minutes into the match, Lana tagged in and faced off with Natalya. Jax then tagged in and Team Raw forced Lana to stand on the ring steps, not to tag in again. Bayley was the first to be eliminated after Royce performed Deja Vu on her and pinned her. Natalya then eliminated Royce by making her submit to the sharpshooter. Evans performed the Women's Right on Natalya to eliminate her. Baszler made Riott pass out to the Kirifuda Clutch and pinned Riott to eliminate her. Morgan then eliminated Evans with a crucifix pin. Morgan was then eliminated by Jax after Jax performed a Samoan Drop on her. The last remaining member of Team SmackDown, Belair, faced off with Baszler, who eventually applied the Kirifuda Clutch on Belair, who got to the ropes, but Baszler refused to let go of the hold as the referee counted to five, thus Baszler got herself eliminated by disqualification. Belair then fought with Jax. The two went outside the ring where Belair tumbled Jax over the ringside barrier; however, Belair did not make it back in the ring before the referee's count of ten, thus Jax and Belair were eliminated via count out, leaving Lana as the sole survivor of Team Raw. As this gave Raw their fourth win of the night, this automatically meant that Raw won brand supremacy.

=== Main event ===
In the main event match, Raw's WWE Champion Drew McIntyre faced SmackDown's Universal Champion Roman Reigns (accompanied by Paul Heyman). In the end, as McIntyre performed the Claymore on Reigns, Reigns inadvertently bumped into the referee, incapacitating him. Although he was instructed to leave the building earlier, Reigns' cousin Jey Uso then ran down to ringside and tussled with McIntyre, enabling Reigns to perform a low blow on McIntyre followed by a Superkick from Jey. Reigns then applied the guillotine choke submission on McIntyre, who passed out, to win the match. Although this gave SmackDown another win, Raw had already won brand supremacy with four wins to SmackDown's three.

=== Undertaker retirement ceremony ===
The 2020 Survivor Series saw the retirement ceremony of The Undertaker, who performed for WWE for 30 years, first making his debut for the promotion at the 1990 Survivor Series event. In what was the show's final segment, Shane McMahon, Big Show, John "Bradshaw" Layfield, Jeff Hardy, Mick Foley, The Godfather, The Godwinns (Henry and Phineas), Savio Vega, Rikishi, Kevin Nash, Booker T, Shawn Michaels, Ric Flair, Triple H, and Kane all entered the ring to kick off the ceremony. A video package recapping The Undertaker's career then aired, after which, WWE Chairman and Chief Executive Officer Vince McMahon was shown alone in the ring and gave a brief, heart felt message before introducing The Undertaker for the last time. The Undertaker then slowly walked to the ring in full costume where he then confirmed his retirement in an emotional farewell speech, stating "My time has come to let The Undertaker Rest in Peace". The Undertaker performed his trademark kneeling pose as an image of The Undertaker's former longtime manager, the late Paul Bearer, appeared via hologram. The gong tolled 10 times, officially putting an end to The Undertaker character. The Undertaker delivered his trademark throat slash pose and then left the ring. The show ended with The Undertaker walking back up the entrance ramp to throw his fist up for one last time.

== Aftermath ==
This was the final Survivor Series to livestream on the American version of the WWE Network, which merged under Peacock in April 2021.

=== Raw ===
The following night on Raw, for winning the men's Survivor Series match with a clean sweep, WWE official Adam Pearce stated that one of Team Raw's members would receive a WWE Championship match against Drew McIntyre at TLC: Tables, Ladders & Chairs and allowed each to state their case. The last to state their case was Braun Strowman, however, he became enraged over Pearce's use of the phrase "last but not least". This led to Strowman attacking Pearce and thus was suspended indefinitely. Former WWE Champion Randy Orton (who did not represent Raw at the pay-per-view but wanted a rematch) and United States Champion Bobby Lashley (who was the only champion from Raw to win his Champion vs. Champion match) each confronted Pearce backstage individually with their respective cases. Pearce scheduled three singles matches for that night, with the winners of each facing off in a triple threat match the following week to determine the number one contender. Riddle, Keith Lee, and AJ Styles advanced to the triple threat match by defeating Sheamus, Lashley, and Orton, respectively. Styles subsequently won the triple threat match.

Also on Raw, due to Lana emerging the sole survivor of the women's elimination match, she was given a Raw Women's Championship match against Asuka. However, this match ended in a no-contest by an interference from Women's Tag Team Champions Nia Jax and Shayna Baszler. This led to a tag team match in which Lana and Asuka defeated Jax and Baszler in a non-title match. The following week, Lana and Asuka defeated Jax and Baszler in another non-title match, and a title match between the two teams was then scheduled for TLC.

=== SmackDown ===
On the following episode of SmackDown, Universal Champion Roman Reigns lambasted Jey Uso for Team SmackDown losing, as well as returning to aid Reigns in his match against McIntyre, even though he ordered Jey to leave the building. Reigns stated that the rest of Team SmackDown did not respect Jey, and because of that, they do not respect Reigns or their family. This enraged Jey, who then attempted to further prove himself by viciously attacking Otis with a chair during his entrance. Later, he attacked Daniel Bryan backstage, causing Bryan to lose his match. In the main event, Jey faced Kevin Owens. Jey was intentionally disqualified after attacking Owens with a steel chair. After the match, Jey continued his assault on Owens, however, Owens retaliated by delivering multiple Stunners to Jey. Owens then taunted Reigns directly, who watched on from a television backstage. The following week, Owens challenged Reigns to a Tables, Ladders, and Chairs match for the Universal Championship at TLC, and Reigns accepted.

== Results ==
| No. | Results | Stipulations | Times |
|---|---|---|---|
| 1^{P} | The Miz won by last eliminating Dominik Mysterio (Note: Order of elimination: John Morrison, Kalisto, Rey Mysterio, Humberto Carrillo, Angel Garza, Cedric Alexander, Ricochet, Shelton Benjamin, Murphy, Robert Roode, Dolph Ziggler, Apollo Crews, Shinsuke Nakamura, Elias, Jeff Hardy, Chad Gable, Dominik Mysterio) | 18-man Dual Brand Battle Royal | 12:00 |
| 2 | Team Raw (AJ Styles, Keith Lee, Sheamus, Braun Strowman, and Riddle) (with Omos) defeated Team SmackDown (Kevin Owens, Jey Uso, King Corbin, Seth Rollins, and Otis)^{1} | 5-on-5 men's Survivor Series match | 19:25 |
| 3 | The Street Profits (Angelo Dawkins and Montez Ford) (SmackDown Tag Team Champions) defeated The New Day (Kofi Kingston and Xavier Woods) (with Big E) (Raw Tag Team Champions) by pinfall | Champions vs. Champions tag team match | 13:40 |
| 4 | Bobby Lashley (Raw's United States Champion) (with MVP, Cedric Alexander, and Shelton Benjamin) defeated Sami Zayn (SmackDown's Intercontinental Champion) by submission | Champion vs. Champion singles match | 7:50 |
| 5 | Sasha Banks (SmackDown Women's Champion) defeated Asuka (Raw Women's Champion) by pinfall | Champion vs. Champion singles match | 13:05 |
| 6 | Team Raw (Nia Jax, Shayna Baszler, Lana, Lacey Evans, and Peyton Royce) defeated Team SmackDown (Bianca Belair, Ruby Riott, Liv Morgan, Bayley, and Natalya)^{2} | 5-on-5 women's Survivor Series match | 23:20 |
| 7 | Roman Reigns (SmackDown's Universal Champion) (with Paul Heyman) defeated Drew McIntyre (Raw's WWE Champion) by technical submission | Champion vs. Champion singles match | 24:50 |
P / – the match was broadcast on the pre-show

=== Survivor Series matches ===
^1

| Eliminated | Wrestler | Eliminated by | Method | Times |
|---|---|---|---|---|
| 1 | Seth Rollins | Sheamus | Brogue Kick | 6:05 |
| 2 | Kevin Owens | AJ Styles | Phenomenal Forearm | 12:20 |
| 3 | King Corbin | Riddle | Floating Bro | 13:05 |
| 4 | Otis | Braun Strowman | Running Powerslam | 17:05 |
| 5 | Jey Uso | Keith Lee | Spirit Bomb | 19:25 |
| Survivor(s): | AJ Styles, Braun Strowman, Keith Lee, Riddle, and Sheamus (Team Raw) (clean sweep) | | | |

^2

| Eliminated | Wrestler | Eliminated by | Method | Times |
|---|---|---|---|---|
| 1 | Bayley | Peyton Royce | Pinfall | 9:55 |
| 2 | Peyton Royce | Natalya | Submission | 11:40 |
| 3 | Natalya | Lacey Evans | Pinfall | 12:35 |
| 4 | Ruby Riott | Shayna Baszler | Pinfall | 16:50 |
| 5 | Lacey Evans | Liv Morgan | Pinfall | 18:00 |
| 6 | Liv Morgan | Nia Jax | Pinfall | 19:05 |
| 7 | Shayna Baszler | N/A | Disqualification | 22:25 |
| 8 | Nia Jax | N/A | Countout | 23:20 |
| 9 | Bianca Belair | N/A | Countout | 23:20 |
| Sole Survivor: | Lana (Team Raw) | | | 23:20 |
