= Interrogation (2016 film) =

- Directed by: Stephen Reynolds
- Screenplay by: Adam Rodin; Michael Finch
- Produced by: Michael J. Luisi
- Starring: Adam "Edge" Copeland; C.J. "Lana" Perry
- Edited by: Paul Harb
- Music by: Nathan Whitehead
- Production company: WWE Studios
- Distributed by: Lionsgate
- Release date: September 20, 2016
- Running time: 103 minutes
- Country: United States
- Language: English

Interrogation is a 2016 American action film directed by Stephen Reynolds from a screenplay by Adam Rodin and Michael Finch. The film stars Adam "Edge" Copeland and C.J. "Lana" Perry. The film is the 3rd installment in the Action Six Pack series of films. The film was released on direct-to-DVD in the United States on September 20, 2016.

== Premise ==
A bomb is set to go off on one of the busiest betting days of the year so a smart interrogator is called in to get answers from the prime suspect but as time begins to end, they both soon discover that there is a larger plan in store for them.

== Cast ==
- Adam "Edge" Copeland as Lucas Nolan
- C.J. "Lana" Perry as Becky
- Patrick Sabongui as Vasti
- Julia Benson as Sara Ward
- Michael Rogers as Mark Bennett
- Erica Carroll as Joan Marian

== Production ==
Filming took place in Vancouver, British Columbia, Canada over a course of 44 days from March 19 to May 2, 2015.
