= Bryan Alvarez =

American professional wrestler, editor, publisher, radio/podcast host

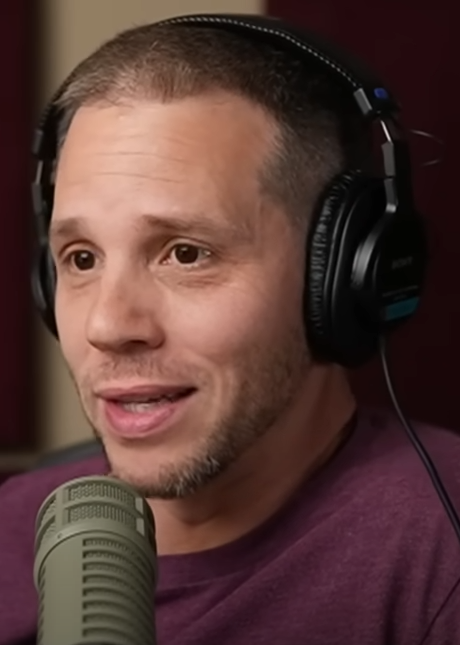
- Alvarez in 2023

Personal information
- Born: June 12, 1975 (age 51) Bothell, Washington, U.S.
- Spouse: Whitney Neugebauer (m. 2010)
- Children: 2
- Website: f4wonline.com

Professional wrestling career
- Ring name(s): Bryan Alvarez; Chico Alvarez; Super Chico
- Billed height: 5 ft 7 in (1.70 m)
- Billed weight: 145 lb (66 kg)
- Trained by: Buddy Wayne; Ole Olsen
- Debut: 1998
- Martial arts career
- Trainer: Justin Angelos; Pedro Sauer
- Rank: 3rd degree black belt in Brazilian Jiu-Jitsu green belt in Shudokan Karate

Other information
- Website: Evergreen Karate and Jiu-Jitsu

Bryan Alvarez (born June 12, 1975) is an American independent professional wrestler, martial artist, satellite radio host, podcaster, and journalist. Alvarez is the editor and publisher of Figure Four Weekly, a fan run, online newsletter that has covered professional wrestling since 1995.

A Bothell, Washington native, Alvarez was trained by Buddy Wayne and later became a trainer himself, training former All Elite Wrestling star Jack Evans.

== Martial arts involvement ==
Alvarez is a third-degree black belt in Gracie Jiu-Jitsu under Pedro Sauer and Pedro Sauer black belt Justin Angelos. He is currently the head instructor of the adult Gracie Jiu-Jitsu program at Evergreen Karate and Jiu-Jitsu in Bothell, Washington. He also holds a green belt in Shudokan Karate.

== Professional wrestling career ==
=== Early career ===
Alvarez and his friends formed a backyard wrestling promotion called Youth Wrestling Federation, which aired on Seattle's Public Access Channel from 1993 to 1995. Years later, Alvarez began working as a referee for local independent shows, which eventually led to him returning to wrestling, when he replaced another wrestler who did not show up for an event. Afterward, Alvarez began wrestling more regularly, at first for free. Alvarez's career has mostly been spent wrestling for various independent promotions in the Pacific Northwest. He appeared in the first match of the short-lived Portland Wrestling television revival in 2003, losing to The Grappler. He was accompanied by a blonde valet, Miss Rent-to-Own (Auto), who was named after one of the TV show's sponsors.

=== Return to the ring ===
A fundraiser was held in which Alvarez stated that if it reached $400, he would do one more match with a friend and former professional wrestler Vince Verhei. He also stated that anyone who donated at least $25 would get a special DVD. The amount was surpassed and in fact exceeded $3000, with donation amounts ranging from one cent to $250, and the scheduled match was posted on YouTube on September 17, 2006. The DVD was released on December 8, 2006. Verhei defeated Alvarez to win the YWF Title, the main belt in Alvarez's original backyard wrestling organization in the mid-1990s.

On March 17, 2007, Alvarez battled Larry Sweeney to a no-contest for Sweeney's ICW-ICWA Texarkana Television Championship. Alvarez executed a German suplex, but both men's shoulders were pinned, and the ref could not conclusively determine a winner. Alvarez agreed to a challenge made on Figure Four Daily once Sweeney agreed to "pay $7,500" to Alvarez. The title match was part of the inaugural Fight Sports Midwest card in Portage, Indiana. Sweeney and Alvarez's promos are available on YouTube.

Alvarez had announced that a rematch with Larry Sweeney, set to take place on June 13, 2007, in Portage, Indiana, had been canceled. Alvarez stated that the rematch would take place sometime in 2007. Alvarez further claimed that after beating Sweeney for his Texarkana Television Championship, he planned to rename it the Frank A. Gotch Memorial Collar & Elbow Pacific Coast Championship.

Fight Sports Midwest announced on September 27, 2007 that the Alvarez/Sweeney rematch would take place at the November 18, 2007 CHIKARA show at the former ECW Arena in Philadelphia, Pennsylvania.

After Alvarez favorably reviewed the Derby City Wrestling television show in Figure Four Weekly, announcers Kenny Bolin and Timmy Baltimore mentioned his reviews on the air, holding up a copy of the newsletter. DCW wrestler Ted "The Trailer" McNaler then came to the announcers' table, complaining that Alvarez disparaged McNaler's physique and intelligence. He then proceeded to challenge Alvarez to a match, insisting that he had an athletic physique. In subsequent weeks, he continued the challenges, insulting Verhei and Alvarez's "Granny" (Alvarez's actual grandmother and an occasional guest on The Bryan and Vinny Show), and was shown humorously attempting to raise money to bring "Chico" to Louisville, Kentucky, where DCW is taped.

Alvarez has said that he was not told of McNaler's challenge until it was taped, and that initially, there were no plans to have a match with McNaler; his comments on the matter were limited to mentions on his podcast and newsletter. But in September 2007, Alvarez, in a video that aired on DCW television, turned down McNaler's challenge, citing his new writing career, and asked him not to insult his grandmother. McNaler responded by further insulting Alvarez.

On October 21, Alvarez confirmed that he would be wrestling two more matches in 2007. On November 15, 2007, Alvarez faced Ted "The Trailer" McNaler in the New Davis Arena in Louisville, Kentucky, for the Derby City Wrestling promotion. After a grueling fifty-eight-minute battle, Alvarez managed to make McNaler submit to the sharpshooter. Alvarez then traveled to the former ECW Arena for an event promoted by Chikara on November 18, and defeated Larry Sweeney with a superkick to win the ICW/ICWA Texarkana TV Title. He lost it back to Sweeney on April 25, 2008, in a four-way match at IWC's Super Indy VII in Pittsburgh, which also included Delirious and Ruckus.

=== Injury and subsequent comebacks ===
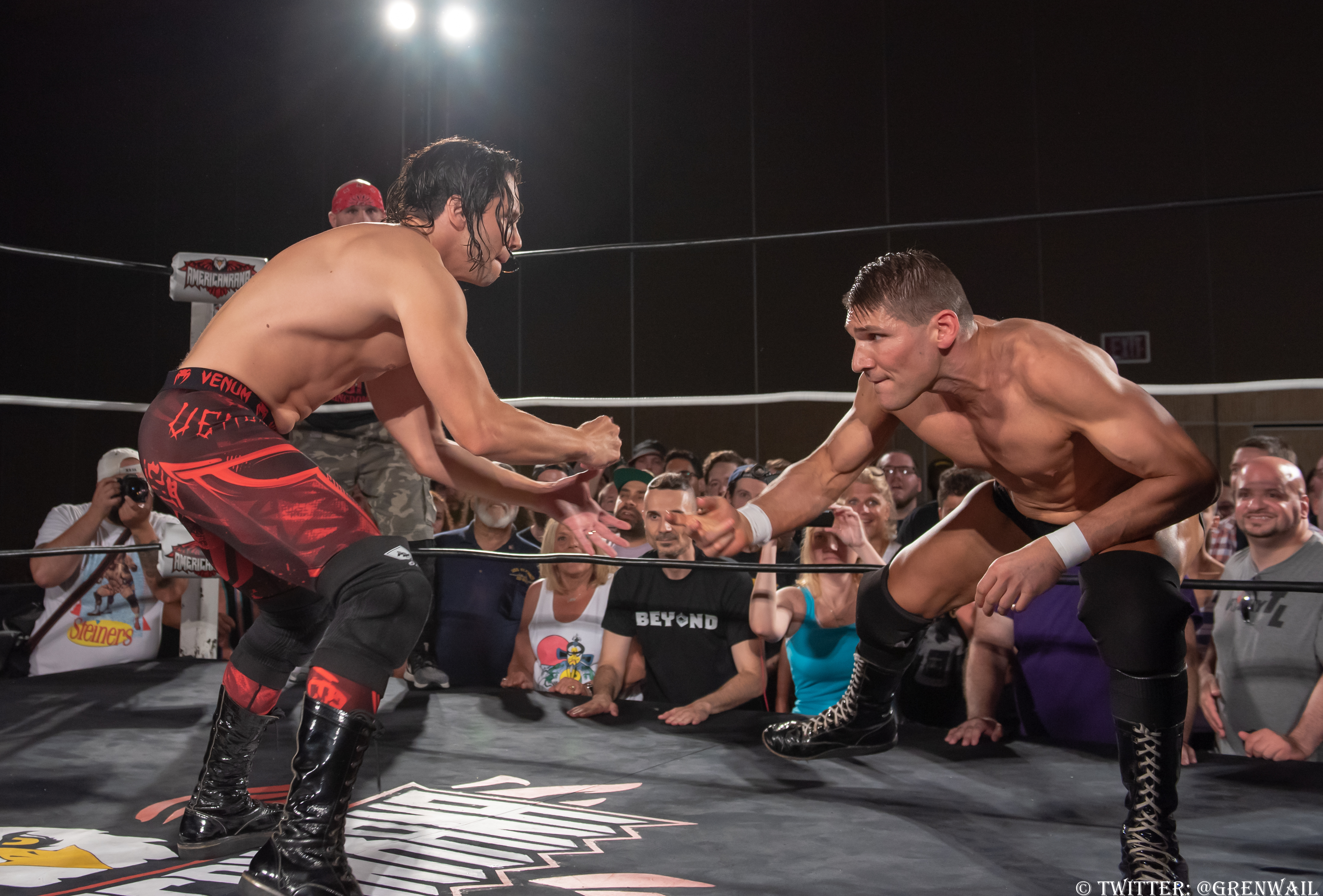
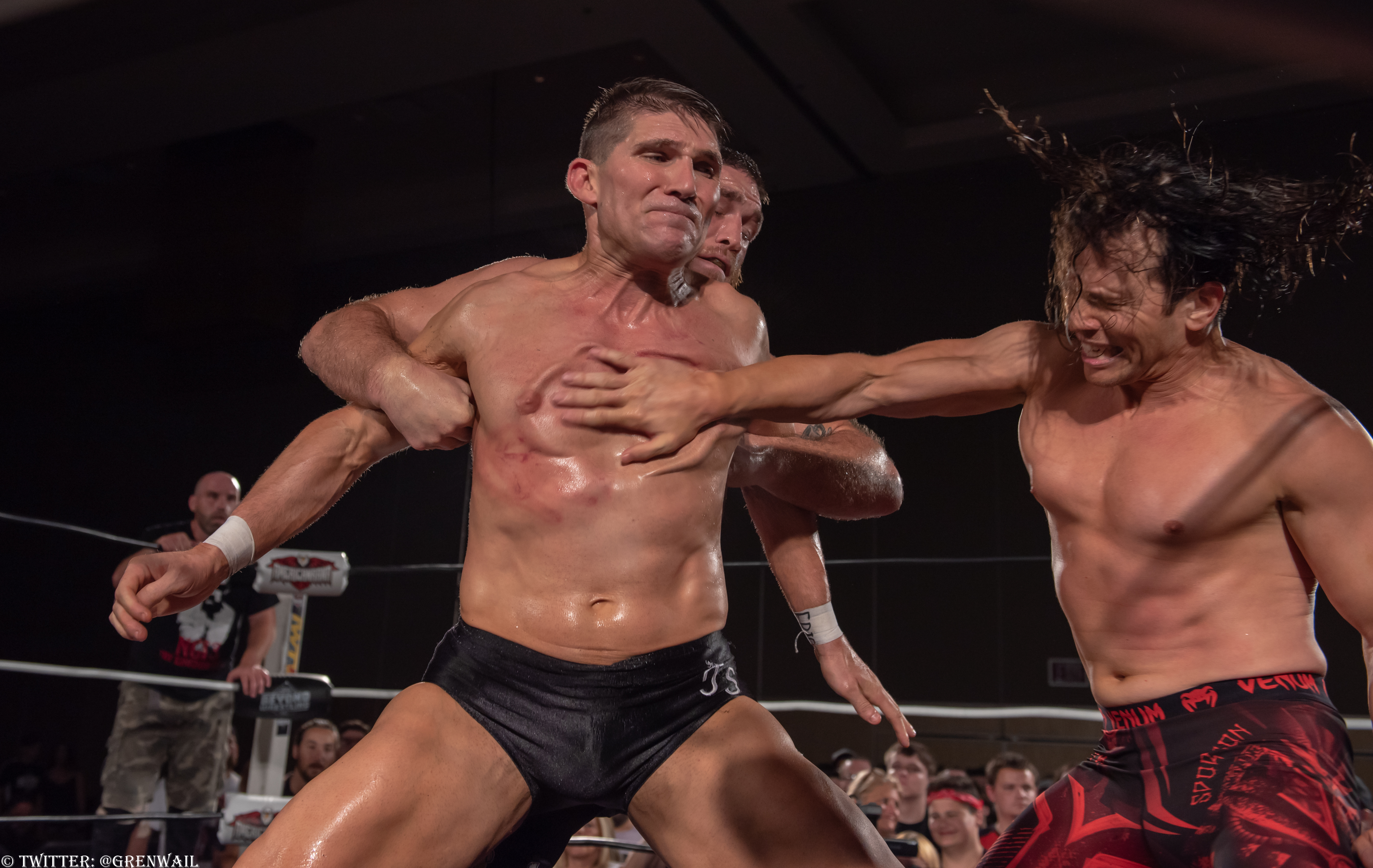
Alvarez wrestles Thomas Santell as part of a tag team match also involving Nick Gage and Tom Lawlor in July 2019

Alvarez returned to wrestling on November 7, 2009, after taking a year off following a back injury. He defeated Mike Santiago at the Tulalip Championship Wrestling event in Marysville, Washington, at the Pacific Rim. The match, along with other TCW matches, is available on YouTube. Alvarez stated that he would be performing on most of the group's future events. On April 4, 2010, Alvarez wrestled Lance Storm, who worked under a mask as the Ideal Canadian, winning with a superkick. In August 2010, Alvarez lost a Loser Leaves Town for Three Months match to Christopher Ryseck. It was his last match with the promotion.

Alvarez returned after four years on August 16, 2014, for a match with Buddy Wayne at the Oregon Convention Center in Portland, Oregon. It was the first ever match for the debuting Wrestle-Sport promotion. Mason Ryan, Chris Masters and Adam Pearce wrestled in the main event. Alvarez defeated Wayne with a senton bomb after sixteen minutes.

On July 14, 2018, Alvarez returned to the ring to team with Filthy Tom Lawlor under their new team name, The Chop and Roll Express, against The Rock 'n' Roll Express at a Black Label Pro show. The Rock and Rolls won when Alvarez was pinned with a sunset flip. He complained that he was the illegal man and had been pinned by the illegal man on the other team. On August 18, Alvarez beat the Beach Bums (Peachmachine and Mikey G) at a Future Stars of Wrestling show in Las Vegas, Nevada. Alvarez had attempted to get Disco Inferno to be his partner, but Disco did not return any of the calls Alvarez made to him during Wrestling Observer Live. Disco showed up at the end of the match, made a comeback on the Beach Bums, but then turned on Alvarez and hit him with the chartbuster. Alvarez still managed to hit Mikey G with a superkick to win the match. Peachmachine claimed afterward that Mikey was the illegal man. On November 3, Alvarez beat Marko Stunt at a Black Label Pro show in Crown Point, Indiana. Stunt had challenged Alvarez to a match on Wrestling Observer Live. Alvarez won with a superkick. Following the match, which saw the two men chop each other bloody, Stunt offered a handshake, but Alvarez turned on him before challenging Stunt and a partner to face himself and Tom Lawlor at Black Label Pro's WrestleMania weekend event in New Jersey on April 5, 2019. The planned match fell apart after Lawlor was pulled from the show due to other commitments, Stunt suffered a broken leg and Stunt's supposed partner, PCO, was signed to an exclusive deal with Ring of Honor, thus leaving Alvarez with neither partner nor opponents.

== Radio and podcasting ==
Alvarez hosted his own 900-number wrestling hotline through Figure Four Weekly in the mid-1990s, then shut it down and moved to Meltzer's 900-number Wrestling Observer Hotline. Originally Meltzer hired Alvarez to take calls for him, but in 1999 recruited him as a co-host after getting an offer to do a show for eYada, the first-ever live streaming Internet radio station, based out of New York City. The original Wrestling Observer Live was the most-listened-to program on the network and the final program to air before the station closed down. Meltzer invited him to be a guest on the first several episodes of Wrestling Observer Live on Eyada as a co-host to bounce news stories off of at the beginning of the program. Later, Alvarez became a full-time co-host. When Eyada went out of business in 2001, the show eventually moved to the Sports Byline USA radio network. Meltzer eventually gave up hosting duties to devote more time to MMA columns for Yahoo.com and Alvarez took over as lead host. The show continues to air daily with Alvarez and Mike Sempervive. It is the most-listened-to wrestling/MMA program in the world, airing on Sports Byline over-the-air radio affiliates, SiriusXM, TuneIn Radio, iHeart Radio, the Armed Forces Network, and online both live and in replay form on the Wrestling Observer website.

In June 2005, Alvarez launched Figure Four Online, a subscription website run primarily by himself and his brother-in-law Tony Leder. Several times a week, Alvarez and Vince Verhei produce their own Internet podcast, The Bryan and Vinny Show, where the pair review professional wrestling and mixed martial arts (MMA) programming, in an observational comedic style similar to that found in the newsletter. The Monday night edition of The Bryan and Vinny Show or Wrestling Observer Radio is free for anyone to download, while other editions done during the week are available only to subscribers of the web site. On June 12, 2008, Dave Meltzer's Wrestling Observer website merged with Figure Four Online, and both newsletters are now available online through that website. Alvarez also hosts Wrestling Observer Live, a talk show where he interviews guests related to professional wrestling or MMA, and Wrestling Observer Radio with Dave Meltzer. Alvarez and Meltzer also do occasional bonus shows covering breaking news.

Other features found on Wrestling Observer Figure Four Online include access to a growing archive of past Figure Four Weekly and Wrestling Observer newsletters, and an active discussion forum. Alvarez also hosted After Dark, a weekend podcast covering various non-wrestling fringe topics including science and technology, UFOs, cryptozoology and the paranormal.

== Columns and books ==
=== The Death of WCW ===
Alvarez's book, The Death of WCW, which he co-wrote with R. D. Reynolds, was released in 2005.

Alvarez and Reynolds revised and updated the original work through ECW Press - the newly expanded edition was released in October 2014 and also won the Wrestling Observer Newsletter award for Best Pro Wrestling Book. Alvarez also lent his voice to the Audible version of the update.

=== 100 Things WWE Fans Should Know & Do Before They Die ===
Alvarez's second book, 100 Things WWE Fans Should Know & Do Before They Die, was released in 2019.

=== Other works ===
Alvarez is a former columnist for British wrestling and MMA magazine Fighting Spirit, as well as a former online correspondent for The Fight Network and the internet radio show Wrestling Weekly. He also wrote a monthly professional wrestling column for Penthouse Magazine.

== Personal life ==
Alvarez married Whitney Neugebauer on July 31, 2010. She gave birth to the couple's first child on February 28, 2016. She gave birth to a second daughter on September 19, 2019.

Alvarez is the cousin of retired Olympic gymnast Guillermo Alvarez.

== Championships and accomplishments ==
=== Brazilian jiu-jitsu ===
- 2013 Revolution Tournament XXII Bronze Medal Brown Belt
- 2013 Edmonds Submission Challenge Silver Medal Brown Belt

=== Professional wrestling ===
- International Championship Wrestling (Cloverdale, BC)
  - ICW Tag Team Championship (1 time) – with Nikkie Sixx
- Pacific Northwest Pro Wrestling
  - PNPW Television Championship (1 time)
- Wrestling Observer Newsletter
  - Best Pro Wrestling Book (2005) The Death of WCW - with R. D. Reynolds
  - Best Pro Wrestling Book (2014) The Death of WCW – 10th Anniversary Edition - with R. D. Reynolds
  - Best Pro Wrestling Book (2019) 100 Things A WWE Fan Should Know Before They Die
- Other
  - ICW-ICWA Texarkana Television Championship (1 time)
