= CJ Perry =

American professional wrestler and actress (born 1985)

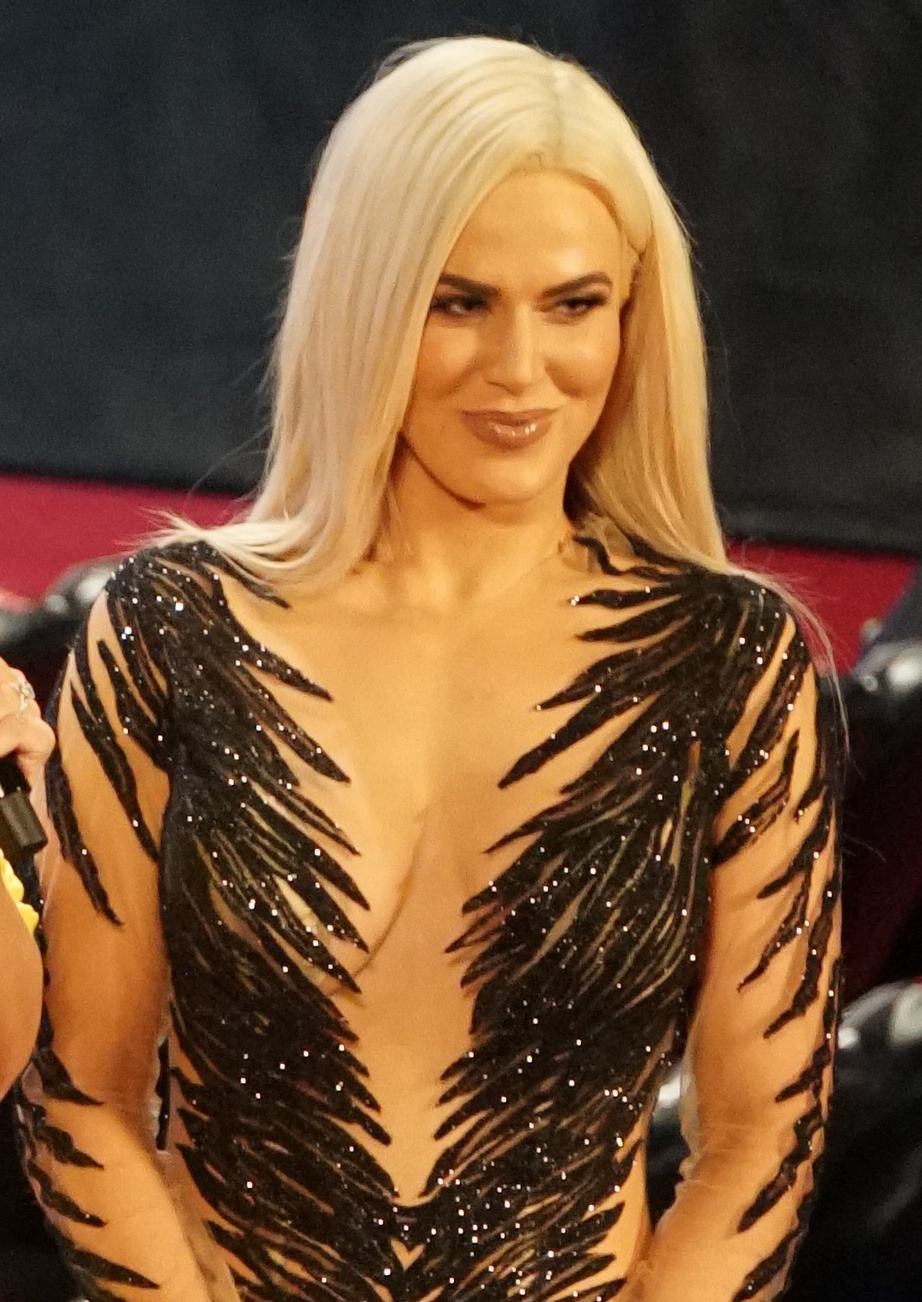
- Perry in 2018
- Born: Catherine Joy Perry; March 24, 1985 (age 41); Gainesville, Florida, U.S.
- Other name: CJ Perry
- Education: Florida State University
- Occupations: Professional wrestling manager, professional wrestler, actress
- Years active: 2008–present
- Spouse: Rusev (m. 2016)
- Professional wrestling career
- Ring name(s): CJ; Lana
- Billed height: 5 ft 7 in (170 cm)
- Billed from: Moscow, Russia (as Lana)
- Trained by: WWE Performance Center; Tyson Kidd; Natalya Neidhart
- Debut: October 23, 2013 (as a manager); April 3, 2016 (as a wrestler)
- Retired: November 17, 2025

Catherine Joy "CJ" Perry (born March 24, 1985) is an American professional wrestling manager, retired professional wrestler, and actress. She is signed to WWE under a "Legends" contract under the ring name Lana. She is also known for her appearances with All Elite Wrestling (AEW) under the ring name CJ.

== Early life ==
Perry was born on March 24, 1985, in Gainesville, Florida, the eldest of four siblings. She is of Portuguese and Venezuelan descent. She spent several years of her childhood in the Latvian Soviet Socialist Republic, where her father worked as a Christian missionary. Perry and her family remained in Latvia after it restored its independence in 1991. From an early age, Perry aspired to become a ballet dancer like her mother. She attended the Riga Choreography School (the ballet school of the Latvian National Opera) and began dancing with the Latvian National Ballet at the age of 14.

At the age of 17, Perry returned to the United States. She initially lived in New York City, where she danced at the Alvin Ailey American Dance Theater, Ballet Hispanico, Broadway Dance Center, and Martha Graham Center of Contemporary Dance. She later enrolled at Florida State University (FSU) in Tallahassee, majoring in dance and acting. While attending FSU, she began attending Florida State Seminoles football games with Jenn Sterger and several other students, cheering from the bleachers while dressed as cowgirls. The students, known as the FSU Cowgirls, entered the public consciousness after being acknowledged by commentator Brent Musburger during a game between the Florida State Seminoles and the Miami Hurricanes that aired on ABC in September 2005.

Perry parlayed the exposure into a modelling career, appearing in photoshoots in publications such as the RIDGID Tool Calendar and working as a spokesmodel for the energy drinks Matrix and Red Bull. Upon graduating from FSU, she relocated to Los Angeles with the aim of working in show business.

== Music and acting career ==
In 2009, Perry joined No Means Yes, a girl group signed to Ne-Yo's record label comprising Perry (billed as "CJ"), Kat, Shea, and Tanu. The group released one single, "Would You Like That", and recorded two others ("7 Years Bad Luck" and "Burn Rubber") before disbanding in 2010. Perry later stated:

A girlfriend of mine in college referred me to the man that was putting the group together. I honestly was so scared to sing and I didn't even know a song to sing at the audition so I sang "Jesus Loves Me". I remember them saying "we can work with her tone because she has the right look and she is a model that break dances". I am so thankful to this day for that experience because I do not think I would have ever gotten the role in Pitch Perfect if I hadn't overcome my fear to open my mouth and sing.

Perry went on to work as a backup dancer for performers such as Keri Hilson, Nelly, Pink, Usher, Akon, and Rich Boy. In 2013, she starred alongside Kelley Jakle in the music video for Jakle's cover of the Paramore song "Ain't it Fun". She trained as an actress at The Groundlings School and under the acting coaches Lesly Kahn and Larry Moss. She went on to appear in acting roles such as an episode of The Game in 2011, the lead role in I.C.I.R.U.S. in 2011, the musical comedy film Pitch Perfect in 2012 and the 2015 sequel Pitch Perfect 2, and an episode of Banshee in 2013. In 2016, she starred in the WWE Studios production Interrogation alongside WWE Hall of Famer Adam "Edge" Copeland.

== Professional wrestling career ==
=== WWE (2013–2021) ===
==== Managerial role (2013–2016) ====
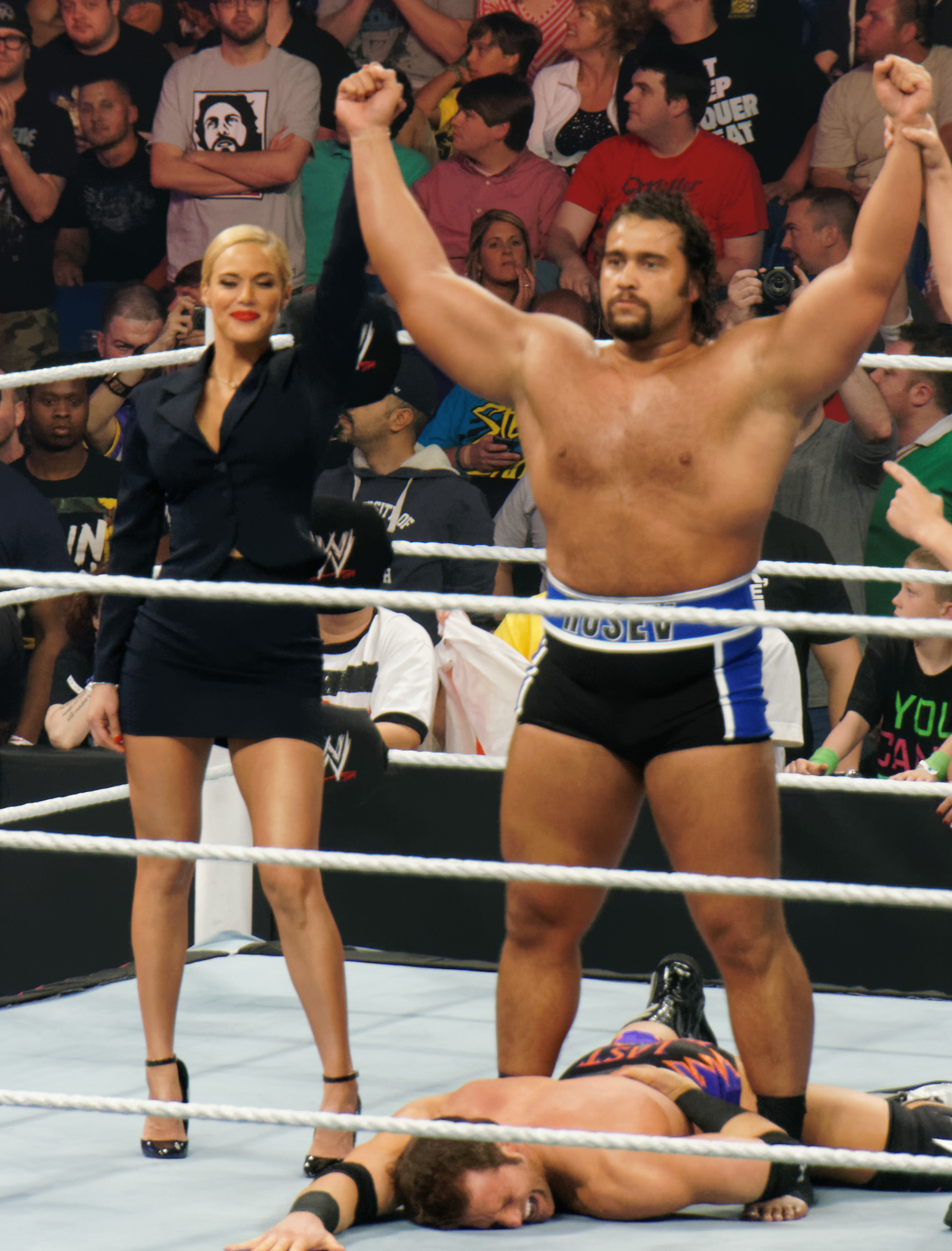
Perry (as Lana) (left) celebrating a win along Rusev at a Raw event in April 2014

In June 2013, Perry revealed that she had been signed to WWE and was sent to their developmental branch NXT. She debuted on the October 23, 2013, episode of NXT, under the ring name "Lana", scouting Alexander Rusev. On the November 6 episode of NXT, Lana became Rusev's "social ambassador", using a Russian accent and developing a character who majored in Foreign Affairs and Business and Social Media Marketing in college. Lana made her main roster debut on the January 31, 2014, episode of SmackDown, where she and Rusev in the following weeks appeared in a series of self-promotional videos and speeches. In early May, Lana began dedicating Rusev's matches to her "hero", President of Russia Vladimir Putin, as well as adopting an anti-American, Russophilic gimmick.

Lana made some controversial comments during an in-ring promo prior to Rusev's match at Battleground, blaming the United States for current world events and praising Putin. Although she did not directly mention it, some media outlets said Lana was making reference to the crash of Malaysia Airlines Flight 17, which happened three days before Battleground, to help build heat for Rusev in his feud against Jack Swagger. A representative of WWE later told TMZ that the segment was not specifically about the Malaysia Airlines crash, noting that the Rusev-Lana storyline "has been a part of WWE programming for more than three months. WWE apologizes to anyone who misunderstood last night's segment and was offended".

Following the November 3 episode of Raw, Rusev defeated Sheamus on WWE Network to capture the United States Championship. At WrestleMania 31, Rusev lost the title to John Cena after Rusev accidentally crashed into Lana, knocking her off the ring apron. On May 17, 2015, at Payback, Cena defeated Rusev in an "I Quit" match after Lana quit on Rusev's behalf. The following night on Raw, Lana justified her actions by explaining that Rusev said he quit in Bulgarian, only for him to harshly dismiss her; later that night, Lana kissed Dolph Ziggler, turning her face (i.e., changing sides) and officially ending their association. After Ziggler being injured by Rusev, he went to return on the August 17 episode of Raw, aiding Lana during a confrontation with Rusev and Summer Rae. Rae went on to "seduce" Ziggler in order to end his relationship with Lana, but the storyline ended quietly, after WWE announced that Lana had injured her wrist while training. On October 11, TMZ reported that Lana had gotten engaged to Rusev, which Lana confirmed. Lana made her return, once again as a villainess, on the November 30 episode of Raw, where she and Rusev referenced their engagement.

On the April 25, 2016, episode of Raw, Lana returned to managing Rusev. After being drafted to Raw as part of the 2016 WWE draft (which took place on July 19), Lana made her first appearance for the brand on August 1, where she accompanied Rusev. On August 8, Rusev's and Lana's wedding celebration was usurped by Roman Reigns, and one week later on the August 15 episode of Raw, Rusev competed in a match for Lana's honor against Reigns but lost. In early 2017, Rusev suffered a legitimate shoulder injury, taking them off television.

==== Early matches (2016–2017) ====
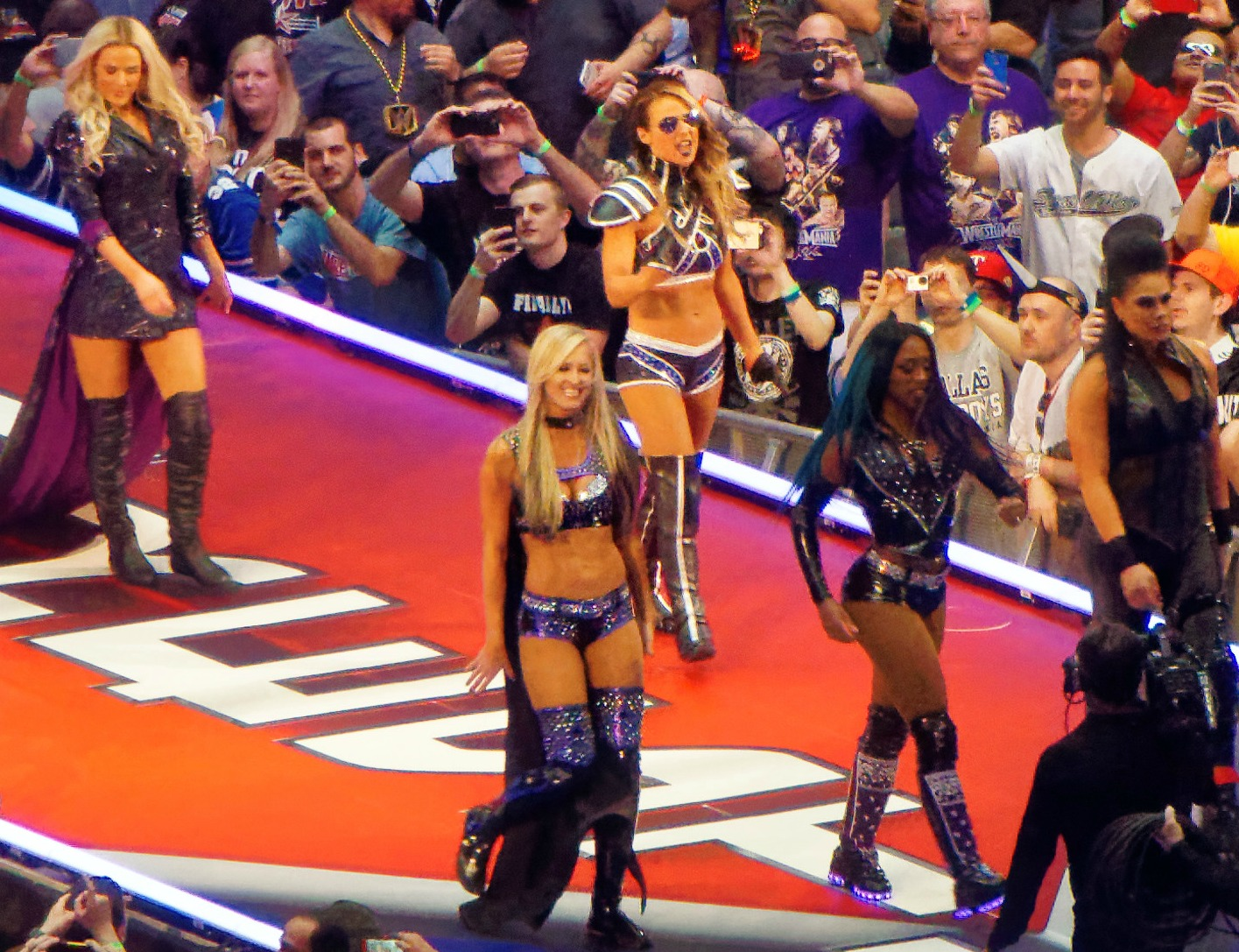
Perry, as Lana (far back), along with fellow Team B.A.D. & Blonde members, walking to the ring before their match at the WrestleMania 32 event in April 2016

On the February 29, 2016, episode of Raw, Lana confronted Brie Bella during a backstage segment, arguing that Bella's fans only supported her out of pity for having a "bad husband", On the March 14 episode of Raw, she distracted Brie during a tag team match against Team B.A.D. (Naomi and Tamina), causing her to lose, and aligned herself with Team BAD. On the March 22 episode of Main Event, she brought the returning Emma and Summer Rae to her guild. As a result, Lana faced off Bella in a tag team match at the WrestleMania 32 pre-show, in what would be Lana's in-ring debut, which her team (dubbed Team B.A.D. & Blonde) lost.

On the April 11, 2017, Lana was drafted to the SmackDown brand as part of the Superstar Shake-up. As vignettes hyping her televised return aired, Lana resumed in-ring competition under her new gimmick at NXT live events that same month. Lana made her return on the June 6 episode of SmackDown Live, unsuccessfully vying to compete in the impending women's Money in the Bank ladder match, and had a feud with SmackDown Women's Champion Naomi. On June 18, Lana was defeated by Naomi in her first televised singles match at Money in the Bank after a distraction by Carmella. She went on to compete against Naomi two more times on the June 27 and July 4 episodes of SmackDown Live, where she was defeated both times in quick matches. On July 23 at Battleground, Lana competed in a five-way elimination match to determine the number one contender for the SmackDown Women's Championship, where she was eliminated by Becky Lynch. At the Royal Rumble on January 28, 2018, Lana participated in the first ever women's Royal Rumble match as the 13th entrant, but was eliminated by Michelle McCool. Lana would compete in the WWE Mixed Match Challenge, teaming with Rusev, where they defeated Elias and Bayley in the first round. Lana competed in the WrestleMania Women's Battle Royal at WrestleMania 34 she was eliminated by Bianca Belair. On the May 22 episode of SmackDown, Lana defeated Billie Kay to qualify for the women's Money in the Bank ladder match marking Lana's first and only singles win on SmackDown. At the 2018 Money in the Bank, Lana did not win the Money in the Bank ladder match the match was won by Alexa Bliss.

==== Various alliances (2018–2021) ====
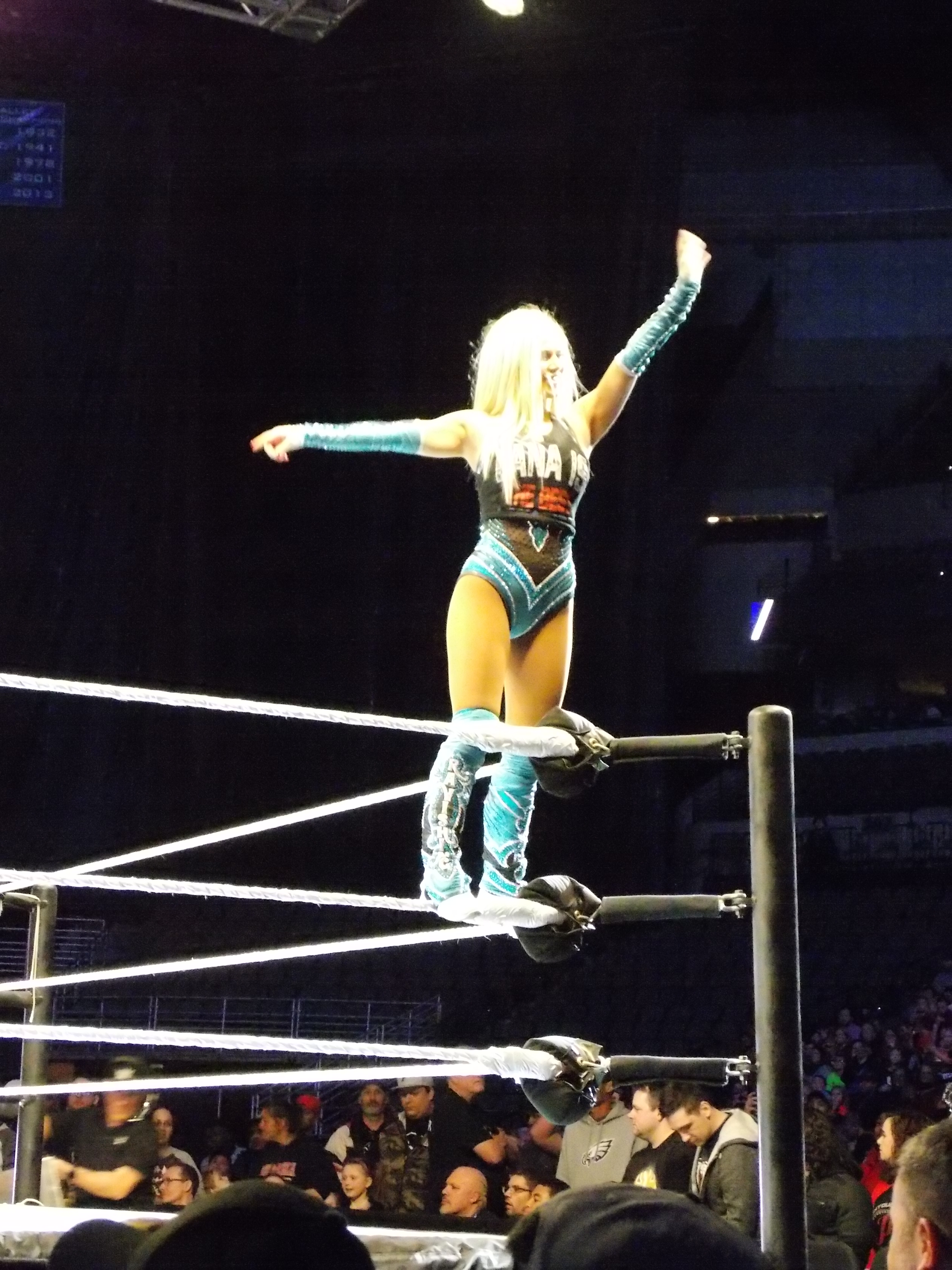
Perry (as Lana) at a WWE house show in January 2019

Throughout late July 2018, Lana was booked with Rusev and Aiden English against Andrade "Cien" Almas and Zelina Vega. At SummerSlam, Lana and Rusev faced Vega and Almas in a match which they lost. Lana competed in the WrestleMania Women's Battle Royal at WrestleMania 35, where she was eliminated by Sarah Logan.

On the September 30, 2019, episode of Raw, Lana started a romantic storyline where she started a relationship with Bobby Lashley, kissing him in front of Rusev. However, the storyline was dropped after Rusev was legitimately released from his WWE contract. Lana then began a feud with MVP, after he tried to gain Lashley as an ally. After Backlash, where Lashley was unsuccessful in capturing the WWE Championship due to an altercation between MVP and Lana at ringside, Lashley chose to stay with MVP instead of Lana. Since September, Lana worked with Nia Jax, where Jax performed a Samoan drop on Lana through the commentator's table. That would become a recurring theme, as Jax would Samoan drop Lana through the table on a weekly basis during Raw. On November 22, at Survivor Series, Lana participated in a traditional Survivor Series elimination match as part of team Raw. During the match, Lana was told by her teammates to stand on the ring steps and not tag in again. At the end of the match, Jax and Bianca Belair from team SmackDown were counted out, leaving Lana the sole survivor thus winning the match for team Raw.

On the next night on Raw, Lana challenged Asuka again for the Raw Women's Championship but lost by disqualification because Asuka was attacked by the Women's Tag Team Champions Nia Jax and Shayna Baszler. On the December 14, 2020, episode of RAW, Jax, and Baszler injured Lana's leg. She returned on January 31, 2021, at the Royal Rumble as the 26th entrant. On the March 8, 2021, episode of Raw, Lana and Naomi challenged Nia Jax and Shayna Baszler for the WWE Women's Tag Team Championship but they were unsuccessful. They competed in the Tag Team Turmoil match at WrestleMania 37 to determine the no. 1 contenders for the WWE Women's Tag Team Championship, but they were eliminated by Billie Kay and Carmella. On the May 3, 2021, episode of Raw, Lana and Naomi challenged Nia Jax and Shayna Baszler for the WWE Women's Tag Team Championship again but they were unsuccessful. On the May 31, 2021, episode of Raw, Lana and Naomi were defeated by Dana Brooke and Mandy Rose. This was Lana's final match in WWE.

On June 2, 2021, Lana was released by WWE.

=== All Elite Wrestling (2023) ===
Perry debuted in All Elite Wrestling (AEW) at its All Out pay-per-view on September 3, 2023, attempting to save her husband, Miro, from a post-match attack from Powerhouse Hobbs by hitting Hobbs with a chair. On the September 23 episode of AEW Collision, Perry (now known as "CJ") gave an interview with Lexy Nair in which she stated that Miro had "lost his way" and that she would be managing other clients. On the October 14 episode of Collision, Miro attacked Action Andretti after Andretti expressed an interest in being managed by CJ. In November 2023, CJ began managing Andrade El Idolo, leading to a match between Andrade and Miro at Worlds End the following month, where Miro defeated Andrade after CJ turned on Andrade. This marked Perry's final appearance with AEW.

=== Return to WWE (2025–present) ===
On April 21, 2025, it was announced that Perry had re-signed with WWE under a "Legends" contract. Her husband Barnyashev (again performing as Rusev) returned to Raw the same day as a full-time competitor. On November 17, 2025, as a guest on Daria Berenato's podcast, Perry confirmed that she had retired from professional wrestling, after being released in 2021.

== Other media ==
Perry has appeared in six WWE video games as Lana. She made her in-game debut in WWE 2K15 as a non-player character, appearing during Rusev's entrance and victory celebration. She later made her managing debut in WWE 2K16 and later appearing in its follow-ups, WWE 2K17 and WWE 2K18. She was confirmed to be a playable character for the first time in WWE 2K19 and followed that up with appearances in WWE 2K20, WWE 2K Battlegrounds, and WWE 2K22.

In 2016, it was announced that Perry would be featured as a main cast member for the sixth season of Total Divas. Perry joined the cast of VH1's reboot of The Surreal Life in 2021.

== Personal life ==
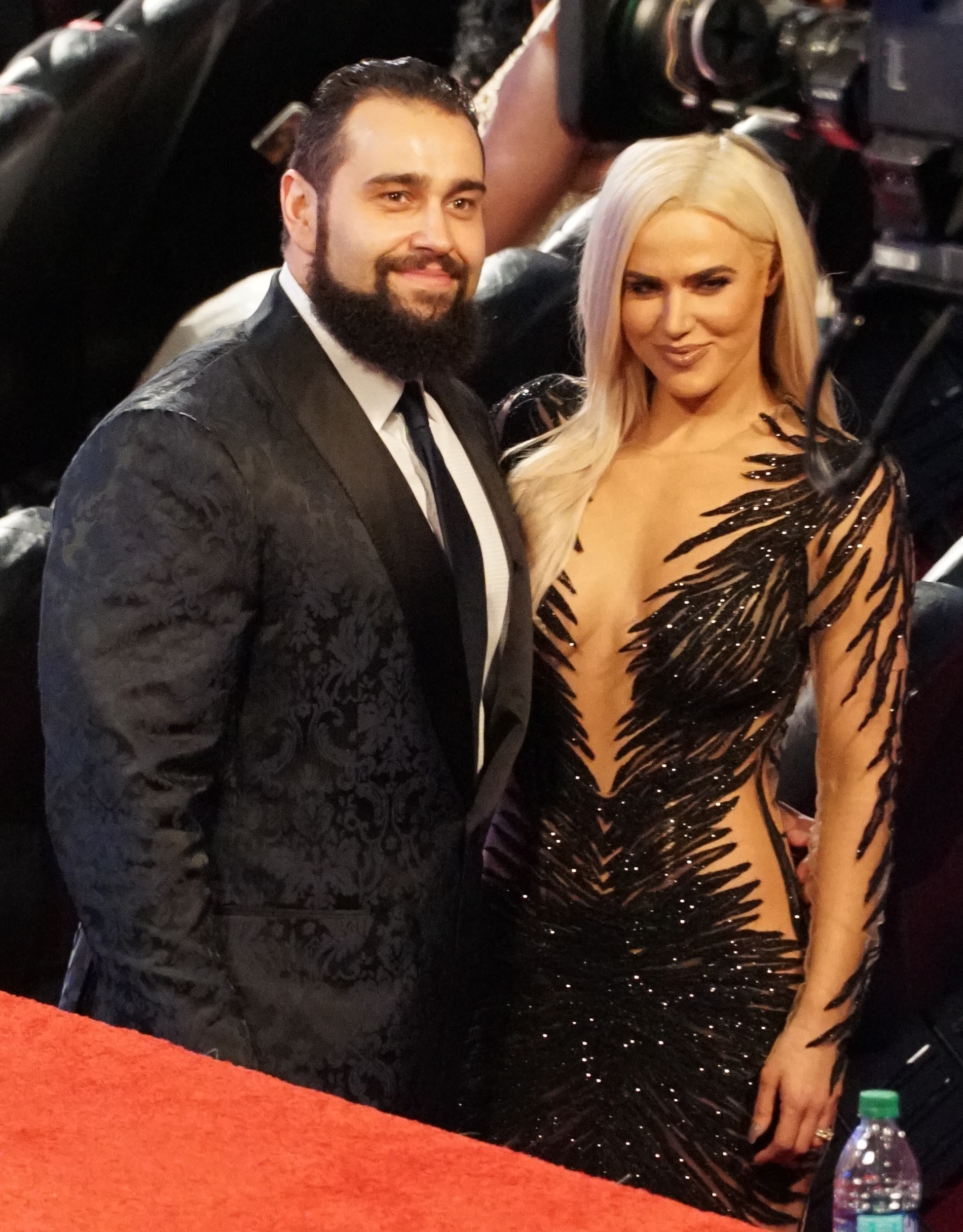
Perry (right) and her husband Miro in April 2018

Perry once dated actor and former American football player Isaiah Mustafa. She married Bulgarian professional wrestler Miroslav Barnyashev (better known by his ring names "Rusev" and "Miro") on July 29, 2016. They separated in winter 2023. In March 2025, TMZ reported that they had reconciled.

In December 2023, Perry was hospitalized with an unknown infection resulting from a splinter that started in her left finger and traveled up her arm; she was released from the hospital later that month after undergoing surgery.

On November 13, 2025, Perry announced that she and Miro were trying for their first child via IVF. On October 27, 2026, Perry and Miro are expecting their first child, a boy, via IVF.

== Filmography ==
Film
| Year | Title | Role | Notes |
|---|---|---|---|
| 2008 | Benny Future and the Madman from Manchester | Arabella | |
| 2011 | Big Mommas: Like Father, Like Son | Dancer | Uncredited |
| 2011 | Big Time Beach Party | Dancer | Television film |
| 2012 | Pitch Perfect | Footnote #5 / Opening Bella | |
| 2015 | Soul | Alexis | |
| 2015 | Pitch Perfect 2 | Legacy Bella | |
| 2016 | Countdown | Lana | Cameo |
| 2016 | Scooby-Doo! and WWE: Curse of the Speed Demon | Lana | Voice |
| 2016 | Interrogation | Becky | |
| 2018 | Another Version of You | Gwyneth | |
| 2021 | Cosmic Sin | Sol Cantos | |
| 2022 | Wifelike | Holly | |
| 2023 | Snag: Chapter One | The Reaper | |
Television
| Year | Title | Role | Notes |
| 2008 | The Millionaire Matchmaker | Herself | Episode: "Tai/German" |
| 2009 | The Real Housewives of Atlanta | Herself | Episode "Better Tardy Than Never" |
| 2011 | The Game | Ashley | Episode: "A Very Special Episode" |
| 2011 | The Fresh Beat Band | Steguitarus | Episode: "Veloci-Rap-Star" |
| 2011–12 | I.C.I.R.U.S. | Brit | Recurring role (7 episodes) |
| 2013 | Banshee | Crystal | Episode: "Wicks" |
| 2015–18 | Total Divas | Lana | Guest (season 4); Main cast (seasons 6–8): 36 episodes |
| 2016–18 | Total Bellas | Lana | Episodes: "Quickie Fix", "Bella-Mania" & "The Bella Comeback" |
| 2017-2019 | Ride Along | Herself | 3 episodes |
| 2022 | The Surreal Life | Herself | Main cast (season 7) |
| 2023 | Nikki Bella Says I Do | Herself | Episode: "Pole Dancing With the Stars" |

== Discography ==
=== Singles ===
| Year | Single | Album |
|---|---|---|
| 2009 | "Would You Like That" | Non-album single |

== Awards and accomplishments ==
- Live Audio Wrestling End of Year Awards
  - Best Non-Wrestling Performer (2014)
- Rolling Stone
  - Worst Storyline (2015) – with Dolph Ziggler vs. Rusev and Summer Rae
- Wrestling Observer Newsletter
  - Best Gimmick (2014) – with Rusev
- WrestleCrap
  - Gooker Award (2015) – feud with Rusev and Summer Rae/Dolph Ziggler
