= Retribution (professional wrestling) =

Professional wrestling group

- The logo of Retribution

Stable
- Leader: Mustafa Ali
- Members: T-Bar; Mace; Slapjack; Reckoning; Retaliation
- Name: Retribution
- Combined billed weight: 1,231 lb (558 kg)
- Debut: August 3, 2020
- Disbanded: March 21, 2021
- Years active: 2020–2021

Retribution (stylized in all caps) was a professional wrestling stable in WWE that performed on the Raw brand from 2020 to 2021. Led by Mustafa Ali, the group also included T-Bar, Mace, Slapjack, Reckoning, and briefly Retaliation. Introduced on the August 3, 2020, episode of Raw, Retribution was portrayed as a faction of masked wrestlers seeking revenge against WWE for perceived injustices within its system. The identities of the core members were revealed on September 21, 2020, and Ali was later unveiled as the group's leader on October 5.

The stable feuded with The Hurt Business, Ricochet, and The New Day but struggled to achieve significant success, recording few victories. Growing internal tensions led to the group's dissolution at Fastlane in March 2021 after Mace and T-Bar attacked Ali. Following the breakup, several members were repackaged or released from WWE.

Retribution received widespread criticism from critics, fans, and industry figures throughout its run. While individual members were praised for their talent, the group's presentation, creative direction, and character development were heavily criticized. Retribution was voted the second-worst character of 2020 by readers of the Wrestling Observer Newsletter and received the Gooker Award for the worst gimmick or storyline of the year.

== History ==
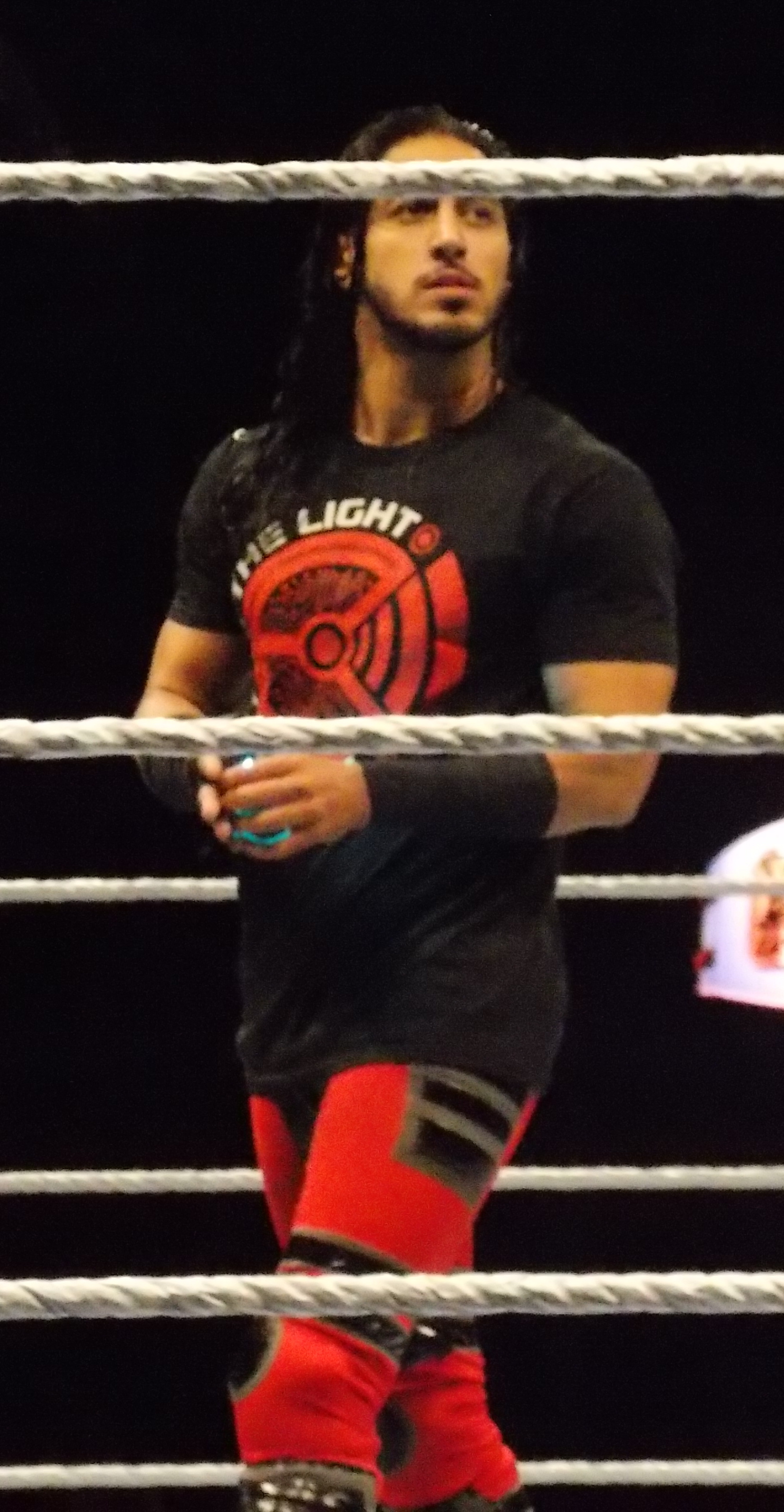
Mustafa Ali was the leader of the group.

On the August 3, 2020, episode of Raw, a masked group of hoodlums disrupted the WWE Performance Center by causing electrical malfunctions and setting fire to a generator. Following their debut, WWE confirmed the group’s name as Retribution. They continued their attacks on the August 7 (taped on August 4) episode of SmackDown, targeting announcers and planted audience members (wrestlers), and cutting the ring ropes with a chainsaw. Over the following weeks, the group explained their motives as retaliating against perceived injustices within WWE.

On the September 21 episode of Raw, the core members were revealed as Dominik Dijakovic (T-Bar), Dio Maddin (Mace), Shane Thorne (Slapjack), Mercedes Martinez (Retaliation), and Mia Yim (Reckoning). That night, T-Bar, Mace, and Slapjack made their in-ring debut against The Hurt Business (Bobby Lashley, Shelton Benjamin, and Cedric Alexander), losing via disqualification. On the October 5 episode of Raw, Mustafa Ali was revealed as the group's leader. Shortly afterward, Martinez quietly departed the stable and returned to NXT.

Retribution continued feuding with The Hurt Business, suffering multiple losses, including at Hell in a Cell, where Lashley defeated Slapjack to retain the United States Championship. The group picked up their first victory on the November 16 episode of Raw, defeating members of Raw’s Survivor Series team. Retribution also feuded with Ricochet, attempting unsuccessfully to recruit him.

In early 2021, Retribution began a feud with The New Day, with Ali targeting Kofi Kingston. Growing tensions within the stable culminated at Fastlane, where Reckoning and Slapjack walked out on Ali, and T-Bar and Mace attacked him following a loss, leading to the group's disbandment.

=== Post-disbandment ===
Following Retribution's dissolution, Mustafa Ali formed a tag team with Mansoor, while Mace and T-Bar continued teaming together, maintaining elements of the Retribution aesthetic. Reckoning and Slapjack did not return to WWE television. During the 2021 WWE Draft, T-Bar remained on Raw while Mace was drafted to SmackDown. Around this time, Reckoning reverted to her previous ring name, Mia Yim, effectively ending her Retribution character. Yim, Slapjack, and Martinez (Retaliation) were later released from WWE in 2021.

Mia Yim returned to WWE in 2022, aligning with The O.C. to feud with The Judgment Day. Mace was repackaged as ma.çé and teamed with mån.sôör (formerly Mansoor) as part of the Maximum Male Models faction, debuting on the July 1, 2022 episode of SmackDown. On the October 25, 2022 episode of NXT, a vignette aired showing T-Bar’s Retribution mask burning, signaling a character shift; he later returned to his former ring name, Dijak.

On September 21, 2023, Ali, ma.çé, and mån.sôör were released from their WWE contracts. Dijak was drafted to Raw in the 2024 WWE Draft but departed WWE on June 27, 2024, after his contract expired and was not renewed.

== Reception ==
Retribution was met with widespread mockery and criticism upon their debut in August 2020. Zack Heydorn of PW Torch criticized the group's presentation, stating that nothing about them conveyed danger or fear. Adam Silverstein of CBSSports.com described their second appearance as chaotic and unfocused, noting that the group appeared rushed and poorly conceived. Fans on social media similarly mocked the stable, drawing comparisons to the Antifa movement, though WWE denied any political intentions behind the group.

Critical reception remained negative throughout Retribution’s run. Kevin Berge of Bleacher Report called the group's identity reveal "awful" and lamented that talented wrestlers were trapped in a doomed storyline. PWTorch’s Frank Peteani described Retribution as a "hideous angle", while Busted Open host Dave LaGreca criticized the illogical decision to award contracts to the group. Sean Ross Sapp of Fightful likened the faction to a hasty response to WWE’s creative struggles and questioned the internal logic of their storyline. PWInsider’s Dave Scherer repeatedly stated that the group had been booked too poorly to recover, calling them "a bunch of losers."

Retribution was later voted the second "Worst Character" of 2020 by Wrestling Observer Newsletter readers, behind Bray Wyatt.

Industry figures also expressed confusion and disdain. Mark Madden and Chris Jericho questioned WWE’s handling of the group, while CM Punk joked about Slapjack’s mask. Eric Bischoff criticized the execution of the invasion angle, suggesting it had been quickly mishandled. Reports from Fightful indicated that WWE talents were highly critical of the group's ring names and presentation, with one wrestler comparing it to "a bad movie or video game." After Mercedes Martinez’s quiet exit from the stable, Lance Storm praised her decision to leave. Former WWE writers Vince Russo and Andrew Goldstein further criticized the faction’s lack of clear motivation and coherence.

== Members ==
L	Leader

Member	Joined	Left
Mustafa Ali (L)	October 5, 2020	March 21, 2021
T-Bar	September 21, 2020	March 21, 2021
Mace	September 21, 2020	March 21, 2021
Slapjack	September 21, 2020	March 21, 2021
Reckoning	September 21, 2020	March 21, 2021
Retaliation	September 21, 2020	October 8, 2020

== Awards and accomplishments ==
- WrestleCrap
  - Gooker Award (2020)
