= Trevor Mann =

British business executive

Trevor Mann CBE
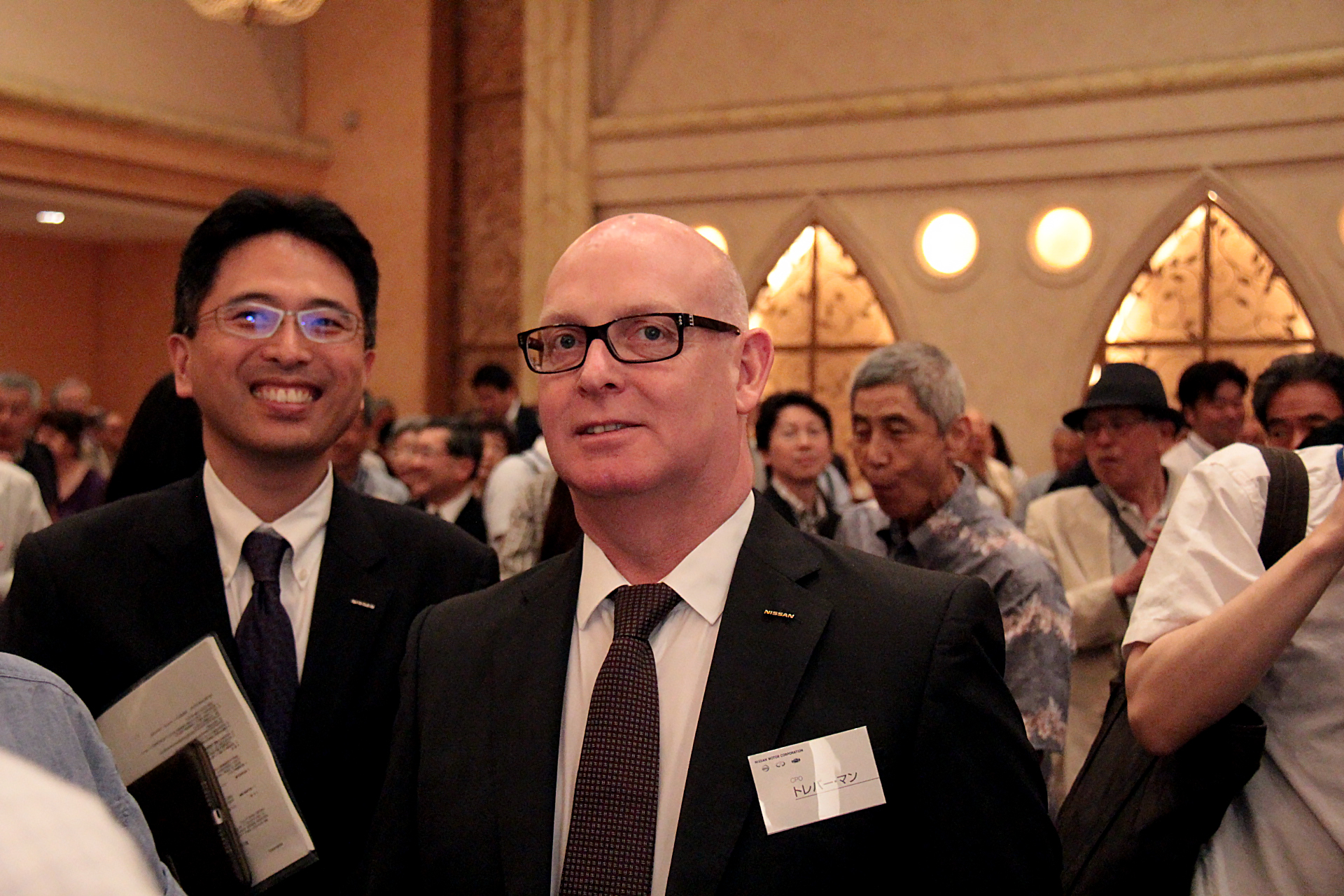
- Mann at Nissan's annual shareholders conference in Yokohama
- Born: April 1961 (age 64); Leigh, Lancashire, England
- Education: Durham Technical College
- Occupations: Engineer and business executive
- Employer: Mitsubishi Motors (former)
- Known for: COO of Mitsubishi Motors
- Spouse: Julia
- Children: 4

Trevor Mann CBE (born April 1961) is a British born engineer and business executive. Mann was Chief Operating Officer of Mitsubishi Motors until 1 April 2019.

Before filling this position in the course of Nissan Motor Corporation taking control of Mitsubishi Motors, Mann was Chief Performance Officer, Executive Vice President and Member of the Executive Committee of Nissan Motor Corporation. At Nissan, Mann was responsible for production, marketing, light commercial vehicles, the global aftersale business, and the relaunch of the Datsun brand. After rising through the ranks, Mann was one of Nissan's longest-serving employees.

== Early life and education ==
Mann was born in April 1961 in Leigh, Lancashire. At age 15, Trevor moved to Durham, where he studied manufacturing and engineering technology at the Durham and Gateshead Technical Colleges.

== Career ==
Fresh out of school, Mann started as a management trainee with BBH Coil & Transformer Ltd in 1980.

Mann joined Nissan's Sunderland plant in August 1985 as team leader in the manufacturing department. Mann oversaw the launch of the Sunderland plant's first ever production line, which made the Nissan Bluebird.

Mann worked his way through various manufacturing-related positions, and finally advanced to managing director and plant manager of Nissan Motor Manufacturing U.K. In 2007, Mann was named Senior Vice President, responsible for Manufacturing, Supply Chain Management and Purchasing of Nissan's European business, which involved a move to Nissan's regional headquarters in Rolle, Switzerland.

In 2012 he took on a global role - as Corporate Senior Vice President for Global Supply Chain and was chairman of the operating committee for Africa, Middle East and India. In January 2013, Trevor was promoted to Executive Vice President and Chairman of the Management Committee for AMIE. He was promoted to Chief Performance Officer in January 2014.

After Nissan took a 34% stake of Mitsubishi Motors, and assumed effective control of the company, Mann was made Chief Operating Officer of Mitsubishi Motors in October 2016. He left this role on 13 March 2019.

== Recognitions ==
- 2008, Wearside and Durham Business Executive of the Year.
- 2010, Honorary Doctorate in Science from Sunderland University.
- 2011, Honorary Doctorate in Technology from Northumbria University.
- 2012, CBE in the Queen's New Year's Honour List.
- 2013, Freedom of the City of Sunderland.

== Personal life ==
Trevor Mann has a wife Julia, three daughters and a son.
