= Fighting Spirit Magazine =

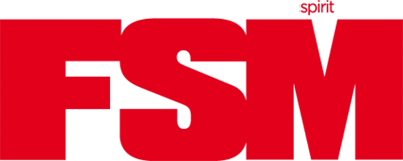
- Editor: BriaElliott
- Frequency: Monthly Fighting Spirit Magazine Spirit Magazine
- Publisher: Uncooked Media
- First issue: 13 April 2006
- Final issue: 15 August 2019
- Country: United Kingdom
- Language: English

Fighting Spirit Magazine (FSM) was a monthly professional wrestling and mixed martial arts magazine published in the United Kingdom by Uncooked Media. The publication launched in 2006, becoming the UK's largest professional wrestling magazine. It folded in 2019, being merged into Wrestle Talk magazine.

== Staff ==
Sportswriter Brian Elliott was the editor of Fighting Spirit Magazine, having previously worked for the Belfast Telegraph in Northern Ireland. FSM feature columnists included professional wrestlers Stone Cold Steve Austin and Nick Aldis as well as Ring of Honor's former executive producer Jim Cornette. Guest columns were provided by Bret Hart, Mick Foley and Chris Jericho. Regular feature writers included Michael Campbell, Will Cooling, Justin Henry, John Lister, David Bixenspan and Richard Luck. Former Pro Wrestling Illustrated editor Bill Apter, who had a regular column before being replaced by Cornette, worked on the magazine in an administrative role.

In April 2012, FSM announced that Cornette and Austin would be joining the magazine staff as columnists beginning with issue 79. The additions coincided with changes recently made to the magazine's editorial style, aiming to take a more formal and analytical attitude to reporting. In April 2014, editor Brian Elliott penned an article on the recently passed Ultimate Warrior, which was re-published on the Wrestling Observer Newsletter site.

== 2008 dispute with WWE ==
In September 2008, Fighting Spirit published a private memo sent by WWE to the gaming press covering the upcoming WWE SmackDown vs. Raw 2009. The memo instructed the press not to publish screenshots of any characters bleeding or using weapons. Specifically, the memo declared that no screenshots of wrestler Triple H could be used showing his character "in a defenseless or vulnerable position." In an article titled "Digital Politics" in issue #32, the magazine refused the WWE's demand and published a screenshot of Triple H being dominated by wrestler Kane. The magazine Power Slam later corroborated the memo.

== FSM Reader Awards ==
At the end of each year, FSM ran both a poll for readers to determine the winners of their annual FSM Reader Awards. These awards would be won by the likes of Drew Galloway, Kris Travis, Andy Wild, Insane Championship Wrestling and numerous others.

== FSM 50 ==
The FSM 50 listed the 50 best pro wrestlers in the world, as per the views of the magazine's staff. The FSM 50 first ran in 2014.

Légende
(▲ +X)	Gained X place(s) in comparison to the previous year's list.
( 0)	Placed identically to the previous year's list
(▼ -X)	Dropped X place(s) in comparison to the previous year's list.
(N)	New entry, as did not place in the previous year's list.
	Female wrestler in the rankings.
	Tag team in the rankings.

Year-by-year placements in the FSM 50:
Place	2014	2015
1	A.J. Styles	A.J. Styles ( 0)
2	Kazuchika Okada	Kevin Owens (N)
3	Shinsuke Nakamura	Kazuchika Okada (▼ -1)
4	Seth Rollins	Hiroshi Tanahashi (▲ +8)
5	Tomohiro Ishii	John Cena (▲ +20)
6	Ricochet	Sasha Banks (N)
7	The Young Bucks	Roderick Strong (N)
8	Sami Zayn	Zack Sabre Jr. (▲ +6)
9	Masaaki Mochizuki	Kota Ibushi (▲ +25)
10	Akira Tozawa	Matt Sydal (N)
11	Tetsuya Naito	Brock Lesnar (N)
12	Hiroshi Tanahashi	Chris Hero (N)
13	Cesaro	Shinsuke Nakamura (▼ -10)
14	Zack Sabre Jr.	Seth Rollins (▼ -10)
15	Kyle O'Reilly	Yuji Okabayashi (N)
16	Katsuyori Shibata	Tomohiro Ishii (▼ -11)
17	Adam Cole	Cesaro (▼ -4)
18	Luke Harper	Daisuke Sekimoto (▲ +4)
19	Dean Ambrose	Masato Yoshino (N)
20	T-Hawk	Will Osprey (▲ +30)
21	The Usos	Finn Balor (N)
22	Daisuke Sekimoto	Akira Tozawa (▼ -12)
23	Sheamus	The Young Bucks (▼ -16)
24	Tomoaki Honma	Kushida (▲ +8)
25	John Cena	Timothy Thatcher (N)
26	El Barbaro Cavernario	Shingo Takagi (N)
27	CIMA	Ricochet (▼ -21)
28	Daniel Bryan	Kyle O'Reilly (▼ -13)
29	Neville	Tommy End (N)
30	Minoru Suzuki	Neville (▼ -1)
31	Dolph Ziggler	Pentagon Jr. (N)
32	Austin Aries	Hirooki Goto (▲ +3)
33	Jay Briscoe	Fénix (N)
34	Kota Ibushi	Harashima (N)
35	Hirooki Goto	Katsuyori Shibata (▼ -19)
36	Randy Orton	Michael Elgin (N)
37	Kushida	Drew Galloway (N)
38	Yamato	Roman Reigns (▲ +7)
39	Masato Yoshino	La Sombra (N)
40	Johnny Gargano	Meiko Satomura (N)
41	Tommy End	Mike Bailey (N)
42	Rush	Tomoaki Honma (▼ -18)
43	Big Daddy Walter	Jay Lethal (N)
44	Eita	Jun Akiyama (▲ +4)
45	Roman Reigns	Bayley (N)
46	Mark Andrews	Jay Briscoe (▼ -13)
47	Rey Hechicero	Marty Scurll (N)
48	Jun Akiyama	Dragon Lee (N)
49	Rusev	Mark Haskins (N)
50	Will Ospreay	Volador Jr. (N)
