= List of professional wrestling websites =

Professional wrestling websites

This is a list of professional wrestling websites: Online websites that focus mostly or exclusively on professional wrestling.

== News websites ==
Name	Owner	Language	Date	Note(s)	Ref(s)
1Wrestling.com	Bob Ryder and Bill Apter	English	1997		
Bleacher Report	Warner Bros. Discovery	English	2005		
F4wonline.com	Bryan Alvarez and Dave Meltzer	English	2008	Merging of Figure Four Weekly and Wrestling Observer Newsletter	
Planeta Wrestling	Revolución Española de Lucha Libre	Spanish	2015		
POSTWrestling	John Pollock and Wai Ting	English	2017	Created after the podcast Live Audio Wrestling was cancelled	
ProWrestlingSheet.com	Collider	English	2017	Created by Ryan Satin	
Prowrestling.net	Jason Powell	English	2008		
PWInsider.com	Dave Scherer	English	2004		
PWTorch.com	Wade Keller	English	1999		
Slamwrestling.net	Greg Oliver	English	1997	Formerly hosted on Canadian Online Explorer	
SoCal Uncensored	Steven Bryant	English	2001	Handles the Southern California Pro-Wrestling Hall of Fame	
Solowrestling.com	Sebastián Martínez	Spanish	2007	Largest Spanish website for wrestling	
SuperLuchas.com	PAPSA	Spanish	2004	Most popular Spanish-language wrestling website	
WhatCulture	Peter Willis and Matt Holmes	English	2010	Had its own promotion named Defiant Wrestling	
WrestleView	Paul Nemer	English	1997	Canada's most popular wrestling website	
WrestleZone	CraveOnline	English			
Uproxx	Warner Music Group	English	2008		
Cultaholic	Cultaholic Ventures Ltd.	English	2017		
Sportskeeda	Absolute Sports Pvt. Ltd	English	2009		

== Historical websites ==
Name	Owner	Language	Date	Note(s)	Ref(s)
Lutte.com	Pat Laprade	French		Handles the Quebec Wrestling Hall of Fame	
Solie's Title Histories	Earl Oliver	English	1995	Oldest wrestling website	

== Sales websites ==
Name	Owner	Language	Date	Note(s)	Ref(s)
Masked Republic	Kevin Kleinrock	English			
Pro Wrestling Tees	Ryan Barkan	English	2010		

== Comedy websites ==
Name	Owner	Language	Date	Note(s)	Ref(s)
WrestleCrap	R. D. Reynolds	English	2000		

== See also ==
- Dirt sheet
- List of professional wrestling magazines
- List of professional wrestling streaming services
