= Gordon Scozzari =

American professional wrestling promoter (1970–2011)

- Born: Gordon Peter Scozzari; June 26, 1970
- Died: January 5, 2011 (aged 40); New York City, U.S.
- Occupations: promoter, ring announcer, TV producer, restaurateur, legal librarian
- Years active: 1991–2000
- Title: President (1991–1992)

Gordon Peter Scozzari (June 26, 1970 - January 5, 2011) was an American professional wrestling promoter, commentator, ring announcer, television producer, restaurateur, and legal librarian. He was best known as founder of the short-lived American Wrestling Federation. It was one of several start-up promotions that appeared across the U.S. in the early 1990s, many with the intention of becoming a third national promotion along with World Championship Wrestling and the World Wrestling Federation. Though the AWF was never promoted as such, it was among the first of these companies to utilize a competitive talent roster. The initial AWF television tapings boasted some of the top NWA and WWF stars of the 1980s wrestling boom, as well as top-level talent from All-Japan Pro Wrestling, the World Wrestling Council, and the U.S. independent circuit. Serious production problems arose during the tapings, however, ultimately forcing Scozzari to close the promotion in 1992. He continued working in pro wrestling as a booker-promoter in the Northeastern United States, Puerto Rico, and the United Kingdom before leaving the industry in 2000.

The circumstances surrounding the promotion's demise were a source of controversy prompted by the Pro Wrestling Torch, which falsely portrayed the then 21-year-old Scozzari as a teenage wrestling fan who had squandered a $100,000 inheritance, with many of the performers taking advantage of his inexperience and naivety. In spite of Scozzari's efforts, it is an urban legend that has persisted in the internet wrestling community as late as 2022.

== Early life ==
Scozzari was born on June 26, 1970, and was raised in the Brooklyn-Queens area of New York City. At an early age, he developed a serious kidney disorder, which would plague him for the rest of his life. Scozzari credited his mother, who was a British wrestling fan, with his interest in professional wrestling. As a teenager, he began reading wrestling newsletters and became part of the New York wrestling fan community during the 1980s wrestling boom. Scozzari later became close friends with Northeast Wrestling co-promoter Mike Henry. Other people from this close-knit group later entered the industry as managers, promoters or other behind-the-scenes personnel, in addition to wrestling historians and wrestling journalists. Scozzari's family was originally from England, and his parents both worked as legal librarians. His father's firm represented Emerson Electric during its merger with a Texas electronics company in the summer of 1991. Scozzari, who was also employed at the firm, held stocks in the company and was able to make a substantial profit.

== Business career ==
=== American Wrestling Federation (1991–1992) ===
At age 21, Scozzari decided to use the money earned from the Emerson merger to start his own wrestling promotion. In late 1991, Scozzari founded the American Wrestling Federation. Jim Quinlan and Sunny Beach were brought on as vice president and head booker, respectively. Scozzari's venture initially received attention from both mainstream and pro wrestling publications for being among the first start-up promotions using national wrestling stars. Unlike UWF promoter Herb Abrams, who announced his intention to "put Vince McMahon out of business", Scozzari's ambitions were much more modest. In a radio interview with John Arezzi, Scozzari envisioned the AWF as a Northeast U.S.-based regional promotion and potential competitor to International World Class Championship Wrestling. He originally planned to model the AWF after Johnny Rodz's wrestling school shows at Gleasons' Arena from 1986 to 1990. Rodz mostly used his students and local wrestlers for these live events headlined by one or two major stars, and he consistently drew between 400 and 500 fans a month. Over the years, however, many wrestlers in the Tri-State area had a poor relationship with Sunny Beach, forcing Scozzari to bring in outside talent. This eventually came to include former NWA and WWF stars and wrestlers from All-Japan Pro Wrestling, the World Wrestling Council and the U.S. independent circuit.

The first television tapings were held in Asbury Park, New Jersey, on December 14, 1991, and Lowell, Massachusetts on December 16, 1991. These initial episodes, which hosted a tournament to crown the inaugural AWF Heavyweight Champion, were beset by major production problems. The TV production crew failed to arrive for the first taping in Asbury, and the Jersey Shore, while a popular tourist destination in the summer months, was virtually deserted in the middle of winter resulting in only 475 fans attending the show. There were also issues with the New Jersey State Athletic Commission, which would not allow The Sheik to wrestle due to his age. Eddie Gilbert, who was hired to be the promotion's booker, decided not to appear despite being paid a $500 advance and provided with a return plane ticket. Pez Whatley and Dutch Mantel offered to assist Scozzari in booking for the rest of the tapings.

The second taping was moved to Billerica, Massachusetts after the original venue, Rutgers University Gym, was damaged by a fire. Part of the decision to leave New Jersey was to avoid paying $25,000 in fees to the state athletic commission. Once in Massachusetts, however, plans to use the local high school in Billerica fell through at the last minute and Scozzari was forced to change the venue again to the nearby Lowell Memorial Auditorium. Scozzari got in contact with Bill Apter who gave him permission to use footage from a Pro Wrestling Illustrated-produced VHS tape to run local ads two weeks before the event. The show advertised 25 bouts, including the final matches for the AWF Championship Tournament, with part of the proceeds being donated to the Children's Hospital and other charities.

Paul Orndorff ended up defeating Stan Lane in the finals to become the promotion's first champion. Orndorff's original opponent, Nikita Koloff, was unable to wrestle due to having recent surgery but appeared at the taping with his arm in a sling. As in Asbury two days before, the Lowell taping was plagued with production problems. Angelo Poffo, who was to be the official ring announcer, abruptly left the event leaving Scozzari to ring announce his own taping. A number of wrestlers did not turn up for the second taping despite many of them being paid to appear for both shows. And while Scozzari had hired a full TV production crew, including a crane camera, all four cameramen missed the elaborate pyrotechnics that went off after Orndorff won the title. On a positive note, the Lowell show sold 1,600 tickets to the event and earned $10,610. A blizzard hurt the live attendance, however, was numbers ranging between 450 and 1,000 fans who were able to make it to the show. And thanks to Whatley and Mantel's efforts, Scozzari had sufficient footage to produce several TV episodes. The AWF also received mainstream publicity from Wrestling Superstars which published a "kayfabe" interview with Orndorff following the show.

A third and final AWF TV taping was held in Staten Island, New York on January 24, 1992, selling out with between 750 and 1,300 fans in attendance. The show was headlined with AWF Heavyweight Champion Paul Orndorff and Sunny Beach vs. Kamala and Botswana Beast, accompanied by High Chief Tulo as their manager, and a battle between former tag team partners Nikolai Volkoff and Boris Zhukov on the undercard. Cousin Luke, Iron Mike Sharpe, Barry Horowitz, Skull Von Krush and Sabu also appeared on the card. Scozzari was ultimately unable to sell the proposed series into syndication. The footage from the AWF tapings were purchased by Mario Savoldi and aired on International World Class Championship Wrestling via the now defunct SportsChannel New York.

=== Other business dealings ===
Scozzari was briefly involved with the Americas Wrestling Federation, an attempt to run opposition to the World Wrestling Council in Puerto Rico, headed by Savio Vega, Gloria Uribe and Hugo Savinovich. The promotion also served as a continuation of the American Wrestling Federation. A brawl between Manny Fernandez and Hercules Ayala from Scozzari's Lowell taping, in which Fernandez attacked Ayala with a knife, was used to introduce the Americas Wrestling Federation audience to Fernandez who had left the WWC for the new upstart promotion. Solid Gold (Jose Estrada Sr. and Jose Estrada Jr.) defeated the U.S.-based AWF Tag Team Champions Sunny Beach and Jeff Gaylord in Caguas, Puerto Rico. Scozzari helped produce two TV pilots for New York-based WXTV (Ch. 41). The episodes featured a mix of Puerto Rican and U.S. talent including, most notably, Savio Vega, Hercules Ayala, Huracan Castillo Jr., Jimmy Snuka, Tony Atlas, Tom Brandi, Misty Blue, and Luna Vachon. Although successful in getting the Americas Wrestling Federation a Spanish-language timeslot on WXTV, the AWF tapes were never sent, and the promotion's financial backer Gloria Uribe defaulted on the weekly $2,500 payments to the station. Scozzari subsequently ended his affiliation with the Puerto Rican version of the AWF.

That same year, Scozzari left pro wrestling following the death of his fiancée in a car accident. He eventually returned to the wrestling industry working with Arena Puerto Rico and Ultimate Championship Wrestling on the New York independent circuit, and as a ring announcer for IWCCW, during the mid-1990s. Scozzari was also involved in British professional wrestling. Scozzari worked with promoter Andre Baker's Hammerlock UK promotion, using his connections to book shows for its U.S. tours, and Welsh promoter Orig Williams before retiring in the summer of 2000.

== Later years ==
Scozzari moved to the United Kingdom in 2001 where he ran a small seaside pub-restaurant in England. He suffered from serious kidney-related problems during the mid-to-late 2000s. He eventually lost both kidneys and was forced to live on dialysis. In a single year, Scozzari was hospitalized over 20 times, with some stays lasting weeks and even months. Scozzari eventually returned to the U.S. where he died of complications from kidney disease in New York City, New York on January 5, 2011.

== Controversy ==
=== $10,000 inheritance myth ===
For many years, it was widely reported that Scozzari was a teenage wrestling fan who had spent a $10,000 inheritance on the AWF, much of which he was conned out of by wrestlers. This originated by Pro Wrestling Torch columnist Bruce Mitchell and repeated by the Wrestling Observer and other pro wrestling "dirt sheets" of the time. Scozzari attempted to correct these false claims but none would print a retraction or allow him to respond to his critics. In an industry where it was common for fly-by-night independent promoters to cheat both fans and wrestlers, Scozzari felt he had been treated unfairly and blamed for events that were out of his control. He had dealt honestly with the talent and all of the performers involved had been paid. Despite the AWF's mounting problems, he also opted to continue on with the show and made a good faith effort not to disappoint the fans in attendance. In 2007, after years of silence, Scozzari interacted with fans in an impromptu Q&A session on WrestlingClassics.com. In addition to answering questions regarding the AWF's history, he disputed many of the claims made by Mitchell and was able to give his version of events for the first time.

Scozzari was especially critical of Dave Meltzer (WON), Wade Keller (PWT) and Georgiann Markropoulos (Wrestling Chatterbox) for not following basic journalistic practices, a criticism also made other wrestling personalities including Eric Bischoff, Bruce Prichard and Dutch Mantell among others. They had failed to verify basic information such as his correct age (i.e. Scozzari was 21 when he held the shows) or reach out to him for comment. Despite his animosity towards many wrestling journalists, Scozzari had good relationships with Bill Apter (Pro Wrestling Illustrated), Evan Ginzburg (Wrestling Then and Now) and Mike Johnson (PWInsider.com). Johnson has specifically credited Scozzari helping him early in his career to become an established sports journalist. Scozzari, who was a fan of both British and Japanese professional wrestling, introduced Johnson to Steven Regal, Dave Finlay, and Giant Haystacks, years before they arrived in the United States, as well as then up-and-coming local stars Robbie Brookside and Douglas Williams (then known as Doug the Anarchist). Upon Szozzari's death, Ginzburg wrote a eulogy for his late friend and dedicated the January 12, 2011 edition of "Evan Ginzburg's Legends Radio" to his memory. He also included an essay on Scozzari in his book "Wrestling Rings, Blackboards & Movie Sets" (2023).

=== Alleged sabotage by Herb Abrams ===
The AWF had been founded a year after the Universal Wrestling Federation, a rival promotion also based in the Tri-State area. Both companies had used many of the same wrestlers on its shows and Scozzari claimed UWF promoter Herb Abrams actively sought to sabotage the AWF tapings going so far as to bribe wrestlers to "no-show" his events. In December 1991, the Wrestling Observer reported that Abrams had pressured Steve Williams and Danny Spivey to cancel their AWF appearances. According to Scozzari, Paul Orndorff and Junkyard Dog both took Abrams' money but also worked the AWF tapings. After the AWF closed, Scozzari's booker Sunny Beach went to work for Abrams and won the UWF SportsChannel Television Championship at UWF Blackjack Brawl.

=== Feud with Eddie Gilbert ===
Three weeks before the AWF TV tapings, Eddie Gilbert was hired as the promotion's new booker. As part of their deal, Scozzari agreed to pay Gilbert $500 in advance and a return plane ticket back to Memphis. Gilbert did not show up at the tapings, which played a major role in the troubled production, and Scozzari never forgave Gilbert.

Gilbert later became the booker for the Global Wrestling Federation. In late-1991, Gilbert was attacked backstage by Jeff Gaylord following a GWF taping at the Dallas Sportatorium. Gaylord was co-holder of the AWF Tag Team Championship in Puerto Rico at the time and there was speculation that he had been paid by Scozzari. The story was repeated by Gilbert in his 1993 shoot interview. Gilbert's then-wife Madusa confronted Scozzari about the incident while he and Junkyard Dog were visiting backstage at a WCW show. Scozzari denied any involvement in the attack. Gaylord, who had recently fired by Scozzari and Savio Vega for wrestling under the influence of marijuana, was wearing an AWF t-shirt when assaulting Gilbert.
