= Kleinrock =

Kleinrock is a German surname which means little skirt. Notable people with the surname include:

- Kevin Kleinrock, American executive producer, writer, director, consultant, and business developer
- Leonard Kleinrock (born 1934), American computer scientist
