= Scozzari =

Scozzari may refer to:

- Filippo Scòzzari, writer and painter
- Gordon Scozzari, American wrestler
- Simone Scozzari, Sicilian mobster
