= Jack Evans (wrestler) =

American professional wrestler (born 1982)

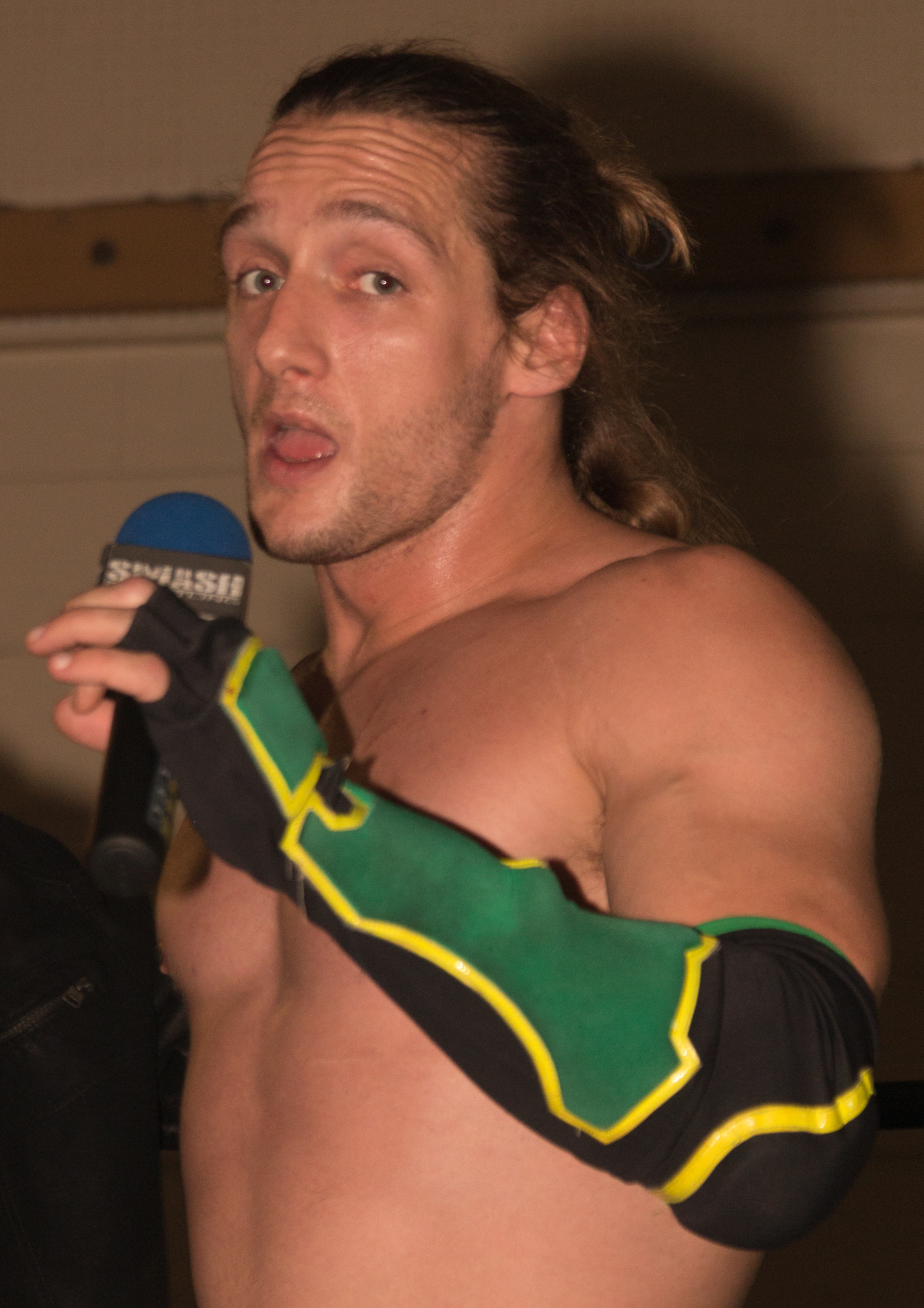
- Evans in 2015

Personal information
- Born: Jack Edward Miller; April 2, 1982 (age 44) Fountain Valley, California, U.S.

Professional wrestling career
- Ring name(s): Blitzkrieg II; Jack Edwards; Jack Evans; Tom Cody
- Billed height: 5 ft 8 in (173 cm)
- Billed weight: 165 lb (75 kg)
- Billed from: Parkland "P-Town", Washington
- Trained by: Bryan Alvarez; Bruce Hart; Ross Hart; Tim Flowers
- Debut: 2000

Jack Edward Miller (born April 2, 1982), better known by the ring name Jack Evans, is an American professional wrestler. He performs on the independent circuit. Throughout his career, he has previous wrestled for numerous promotions around the world, including Calgary's Stampede Wrestling, Ring of Honor, Dragon Gate, Combat Zone Wrestling, Lucha Underground, Pro Wrestling Guerrilla, Pro Wrestling Noah, Wrestling Society X and All Elite Wrestling. He is a former PWG World Tag Team Champion and winner of the 2008 Dynamite Duumvirate Tag Team Title Tournament (with Roderick Strong).

== Professional wrestling career ==
=== Training and early career (2000–2004) ===
Evans made his debut in September 2000 against Tiger Redding. He then began wrestling in the Matrats promotion, which was set up by Eric Bischoff. In mid-2003, Evans broke his ankle, before competing for Stampede Wrestling after recovering. He also wrestled for Major League Wrestling (MLW) in 2003 and early 2004. He challenged for the MLW Junior Heavyweight Championship, losing a singles match to the champion Sonjay Dutt, and also unsuccessfully participating in a four-way match, also involving Dutt, Puma and Chasyn Rance. During his time in MLW, he also wrestled under a mask as "Dark Fuego" to team with Pete Wilson.

=== Ring of Honor ===
==== Singles Competition (2003) ====
Evans made his Ring of Honor debut on November 1, 2003, at Main Event Spectacles, where he wrestled in a Scramble Cage match with Teddy Hart, won by The Backseat Boyz, and which also included Special K, The S.A.T., and The Carnage Crew. The match was highly praised, and featuring Evans performing a 720° moonsault off the top of the cage, making him one of the first people to do a moonsault with two full rotations. Following the match, Evans was involved in an altercation with Samoa Joe.

==== Generation Next (2004–2005) ====
On May 22, 2004, Evans turned into a villainous character by joining Generation Next faction with Alex Shelley, Austin Aries, and Roderick Strong. Generation Next felt that they were the top athletes in ROH, and they were going to take the top spots in the company any way they could. For the rest of 2004, Generation Next feuded with the likes of the Second City Saints and Ricky Steamboat, as well as others in the ROH roster. At Final Battle, Aries confronted Shelley after he lost a tag match with Strong to CM Punk and Steve Corino. Aries told Shelley to step down as the leader of Generation Next, and then attacked him before Shelley could answer. Strong pulled Aries off Shelley, but then turned around and helped in the beat down. Evans was not present for the event and did not return for the next several shows, leaving into questioning if he would side with Shelley or Aries and Strong. He returned at part one of the Third Anniversary Show on February 19, 2005, teaming up with Strong to face The Ring Crew Express, The Carnage Crew, and Special K (Izzy and Deranged) in a Scramble Cage match. On February 26, Evans lost in a match against Alex Shelley. Following the match, all three members of Generation Next attacked Shelley.

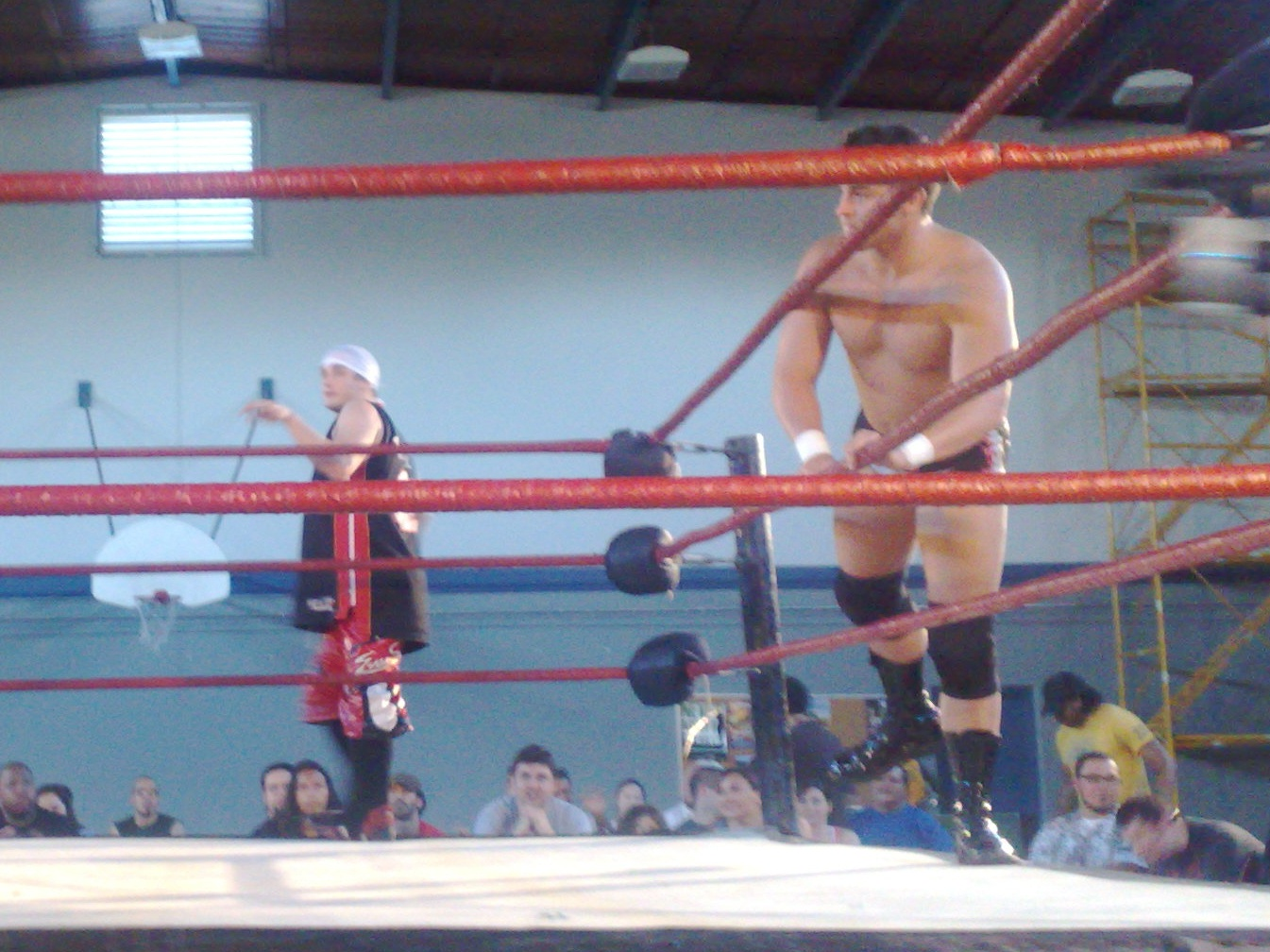
Evans (left) entering the ring with his Generation Next partner, Roderick Strong

On December 12, 2004, Blitzkrieg gave his gimmick and mask to Evans. Since then, Evans competes on occasion as Blitzkrieg II.

On March 5, Generation Next competed in the Trios Tournament. They won their first two matches, defeating the team of Davey Andrews, Shane Hagadorn, and Anthony Franco (students of the Ring of Honor wrestling school) in the first round, and the team of the Second City Saints (CM Punk and Colt Cabana) and Steve Corino in the second round. Generation Next lost in the finals, however, against The Rottweilers (Homicide, Ricky Reyes and Rocky Romero).

Generation Next spent most of 2005 feuding with Alex Shelley. Shelley, due to his actions while he was the leader of Generation Next, was unable to find many allies in the ROH locker room and was left to defend himself against Generation Next. Eventually, Prince Nana offered him a spot in The Embassy, but he refused, although he soon changed his mind. Shelley joining the Embassy turned Generation Next into faces and the two factions continued to wage war on each other for the rest of the year. On August 12, Generation Next added Matt Sydal to the group, as well as his valet Daizee Haze. Generation Next soon had another valet when Jade Chung, tired of the way she was being abused by Prince Nana, turned on the Embassy. On November 5, Haze betrayed Generation Next and joined the Embassy. The Generation Next/Embassy feud ended on December 3, in a steel cage elimination match, with Generation Next emerging victorious.

=== Total Nonstop Action Wrestling (2004, 2011) ===
In 2004, wrestling promoter and personality "Coach" Scott D'Amore brought together fellow Canadians to form his own incarnation of Team Canada in Total Nonstop Action Wrestling (TNA) for 2004 American and World X-Cup Tournaments. Evans, despite being American, was added to the team, which was composed of Teddy Hart as team captain and both Johnny Devine and Petey Williams as his teammates. When the World X-Cup was announced, the team was revamped to add power to the speed and agility in the previous incarnation of the team, with Hart and Evans being replaced by Eric Young and Bobby Roode. The team made it to the finals, which was an Ultimate X match, but lost to Team USA (Jerry Lynn, Chris Sabin, Christopher Daniels and Elix Skipper).

As part of the working agreement between AAA and TNA, Evans made his return to TNA on June 28, 2011, at the tapings of the edition of July 7 of Impact Wrestling, defeating Jesse Sorensen and Tony Nese in a three-way match to advance to a four-way match for a TNA contract at Destination X. At the pay-per-view, Evans was defeated in the finals by Austin Aries.

=== Dragon Gate and return to ROH ===
==== Dragon Gate (2006–2007) ====
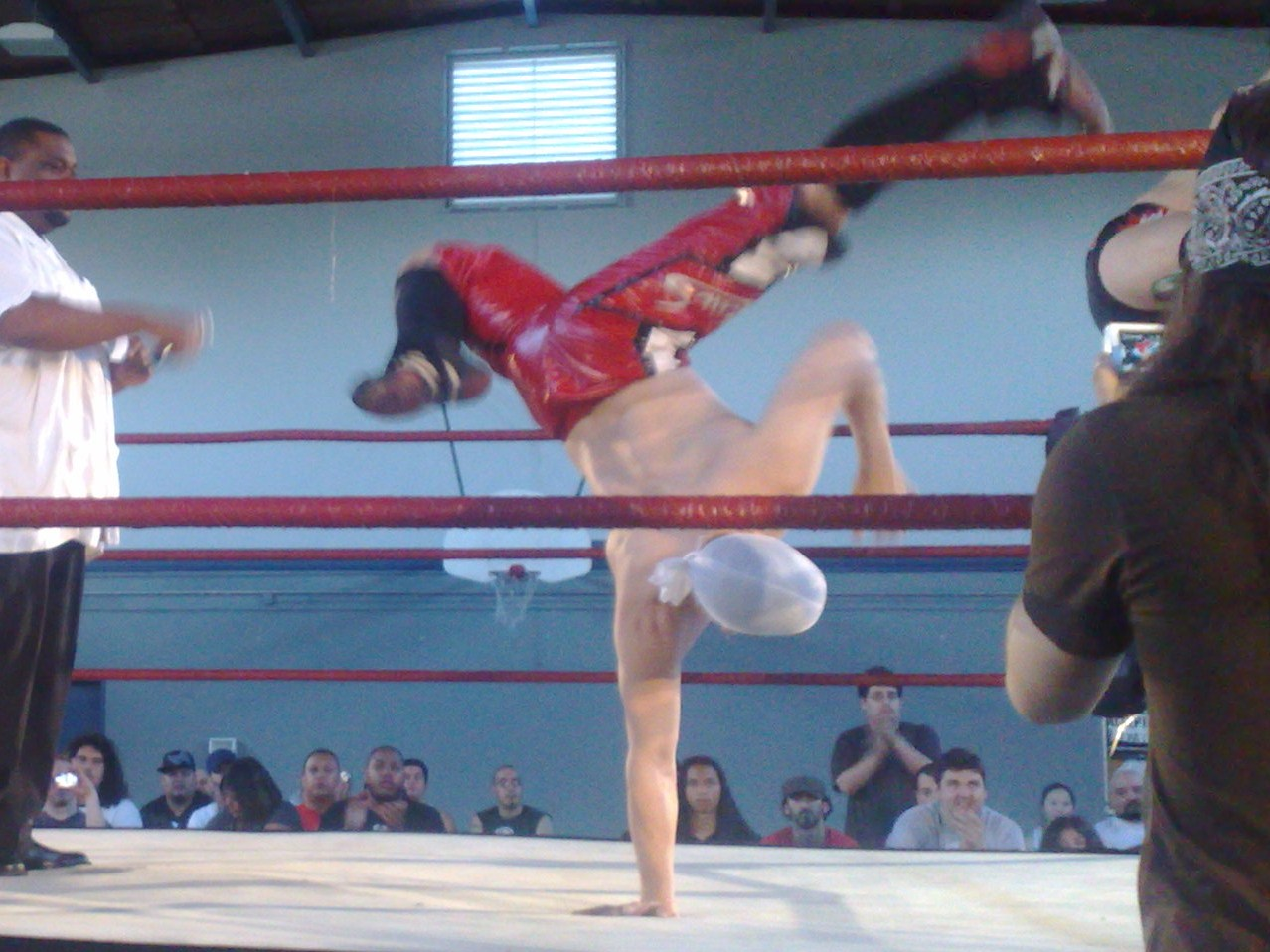
Evans breakdancing in the ring

That same month, Evans and Roderick Strong toured Japan with the Dragon Gate promotion. Starting in April 2006, Evans moved to Japan for three months to train and wrestle with the Dragon Gate promotion. In Dragon Gate, Evans became a member of CIMA's Blood Generation faction. 2006 brought changes for Evans and ROH, as Austin Aries and Roderick Strong were the tag team champions while Evans and Matt Sydal began to work more in Japan. On March 30, Generation Next lost to the Dragon Gate stable Blood Generation. With Sydal and Evans touring in Japan, Roderick Strong and Austin Aries announced at the June 3 Ring of Honor show that there was no longer a need for Generation Next. Evans teamed with Aries, Strong, and Sydal one last time on July 29 at Generation Now, losing to the team of Davey Richards, Jerelle Clark, and The Irish Airborne. Following with match, Evans, Aries, Strong, and Sydal laid down their Generation Next shirts in the middle of the ring, officially ending Generation Next. Evans stayed in Japan for the rest of 2006, wrestling for Dragon Gate. He returned to ROH on January 26, 2007, in Braintree, Massachusetts, defeating Eddie Edwards.

==== The Vulture Squad (2007–2008) ====
After returning to ROH, Evans began feuding with Roderick Strong and his No Remorse Corps faction. In order to combat the numbers of the No Remorse Corps, Evans enlisted Ruckus, Jigsaw and Julius Smokes to form his own faction known as The Vulture Squad. Evans announced Ruckus and Smokes as members on August 25, at Manhattan Mayhem II after competing against Austin Aries and Strong in a triple threat match, won by Aries, and Jigsaw joined a few weeks later. On December 20 at Final Battle 2007, Mercedes Martinez joined The Vulture Squad, and Evans named her "The Booty Vulture". The Vulture Squad was scheduled to face The Briscoe Brothers at Breakout in January 2008, but Evans suffered a severe facial injury in Dragon Gate due to a kick from Human Tornado prior to the event while Ruckus missed the show due to pneumonia. They were instead replaced with Vulture Squad member Jigsaw and Matt Cross.

=== Wrestling Society X (2006) ===
In 2006, Evans taped episodes on Wrestling Society X, which aired on MTV in 2007. In the company's first televised match on the inaugural episode, Evans defeated Matt Sydal. On the following episode, he defeated El Hombre Blanco Enmascarado. In a later episode he defeated Scorpio Sky. His most notable feud was with the Human Tornado. The two tied in a "dance off" and had a 10-minute time limit draw on the ninth episode of the show.

=== Lucha Libre AAA Worldwide ===
==== Debut and The Hart Foundation 2.0 (2008–2009) ====
In 2008, Evans joined AAA as a member of the villainous group La Legión Extranjera (The Foreign Legion), led by Konnan. Upon joining AAA, Evans began re-teaming with Teddy Hart as The Hart Foundation 2.0. During this time, Evans along with Hart came close to winning the AAA World Tag Team Championships on several occasions.

Starting in May and throughout the beginning of June 2009, Evans and Hart began to have issues as a team. After a match in a tournament for the Cruiserweight Championship against Xtreme Tiger, the team finally broke up. After the breakup, many members of La Legión assaulted Evans before ousting him from the group. Following his departure from the group, Evans joined Team AAA and thus became a fan favorite, representing the named owner of AAA who was fighting Konnan for control of the company. At Triplemania XVII Evans and Team AAA defeated La Legión Extranjera to win control of AAA and force Konnan out of the company. Evans returned to Ring of Honor on December 19, 2009, at the company's first live pay-per-view, Final Battle 2009, where he defeated his AAA nemesis, Teddy Hart.

==== Championship success (2010–2012) ====
On June 6, 2010, at Triplemania XVIII Evans defeated Christopher Daniels, Extreme Tiger and Nosawa in a four-way elimination match to win the AAA Cruiserweight Championship. On March 21, 2011, Evans teamed with Extreme Tiger to defeat Los Maniacos (Silver King and Último Gladiador) for the AAA World Tag Team Championship, making Evans a double champion. Evans and Tiger made their first successful defense of the title on June 18 at Triplemanía XIX, defeating the TNA team of Abyss and Mr. Anderson in a steel cage match. On September 16, the 467th day of his reign as the AAA Cruiserweight Champion, Evans made his first title defense, defeating Escoria. On October 9 at Héroes Inmortales, Evans and Tiger lost the AAA World Tag Team Championship to Abyss and Chessman in a Tables, Ladders, and Chairs match. Afterwards, Evans began feuding with Los Perros del Mal leader El Hijo del Perro Aguayo, pinning him in back-to-back tag team matches on November 14 and 26. On December 16 at Guerra de Titanes, Evans and Aguayo continued their rivalry in a six-man tag team match, during which they busted each other open. Eventually, Aguayo's team won the match, when Héctor Garza pinned Fénix. On March 18, 2012, at Rey de Reyes, Evans faced Aguayo and two other Perros del Mal, Garza and L.A. Park, in the finals of the Rey de Reyes. Despite managing to outlast both Park and Garza, Evans was eventually pinned by Aguayo for the win. On May 19, Evans lost the AAA Cruiserweight Championship to Juventud Guerrera in a four-way hardcore match, which also included Psicosis and Teddy Hart, ending his reign at 713 days. On August 5 at Triplemanía XX, Evans reunited with Hart for one night to take part in a Parejas Suicidas steel cage match, featuring three other former tag teams. However, both Evans and Hart managed to escape the cage and avoid having to face each other in a Lucha de Apuestas Hair vs. Hair match.

==== Los Güeros del Cielo (2013–2016) ====
In early 2013, Evans formed the Los Güeros del Cielo ("The Sky Blondes") tag team with South African wrestler Angélico. On October 18 at Héroes Inmortales VII, Evans and Angélico won a four-way match to become the new AAA World Tag Team Champions. On December 7, 2014, at Guerra de Titanes Angélico and Evans lost the AAA World Tag Team Championships to Joe Líder and Pentagón Jr. in a three-way tag team match that also included Fénix and Myzteziz. Evans and Ángelico then entered a feud with Dark Cuervo and Dark Escoria, which culminated on June 14, 2015, at Verano de Escándalo, where Evans and Ángelico were victorious in a steel cage Lucha de Apuestas. As per stipulation, Cuervo and Escoria were forced to have their heads shaved following the match. On October 4, 2015, at Héroes Inmortales IX, Evans and Angélico regained the AAA World Tag Team Championship from Líder and Pentagón Jr. in a three-way match, also involving Daga and Steve Pain. They vacated the title on January 22, 2016, due to Angélico suffering a leg injury. On July 17, 2016, Evans and Angélico won the AAA World Tag Team Championship for the third time. On September 29, 2016, Evans criticized AAA and fellow wrestler La Parka during an interview with Solowrestling.com. A few days later, AAA removed him from all shows. On October 22, 2016, Evans left AAA.

=== Lucha Underground (2015–2018) ===
On May 13, 2015, Evans made his Lucha Underground debut where he was defeated by Aero Star. On June 3 Evans got his first win against Argenis. On May 25, 2016, Evans teamed with Johnny Mundo and P. J. Black, forming a group known as "Worldwide Underground", to defeat Dragon Azteca Jr., Prince Puma and Rey Mysterio for the Lucha Underground Trios Championship. On July 20 at Ultima Lucha Dos Part 3 The Worldwide Underground were defeated by Aero Star, Drago and Fénix for the Lucha Underground Trios Championship. On October 12 Evans was unsuccessful at winning the Lucha Underground Gift Of The Gods Championship against Sexy Star. On 5 April 2018 at the Impact Wrestling vs Lucha Underground show, Evans loses against Matanza Cueto in a 6-man match. On April 10, 2018, Evans officially announced his departure from Lucha Underground.

=== Return to PWG (2015–2016) ===
Evans returned to Pro Wrestling Guerilla at PWG Treemendous IV on July 24, 2015, teaming with Angelico unsuccessfully challenging the Young Bucks for the PWG World Tag Team Championship. Evans then entered to the Battle Of Los Angeles 2015, defeating Angelico in the first round, Brian Cage in the second but losing to Chris Hero in the Semi Final. At PWG Lemmy event on January 2, 2016, he was defeated by Drew Galloway. Evans returned at PWG Bowie Event on February 12, 2016, where he defeated Sami Callihan.

=== Return to AAA (2018–2019) ===
On July 13, 2018, Evans made his return to the AAA as Rudo teaming with Juventud Guerrera and Taurus defeating Los Nuevos Mosqueteros del Diablo (La Máscara & La Máscara) and Aero Star. He wrestled throughout 2018, into 2019. On March 16, 2019, he wrestled at Rey de Reyes (2019) in scramble match that was won by Aerostar. He was scheduled to wrestle in an Ultimate X match in his return to TNA now known as Impact Wrestling, representing AAA through their partnership with Impact. This match took place WrestleMania 35 weekend in April 2019. However, Evans was replaced by Impact's Ace Austin without given reason.

=== All Elite Wrestling (2019–2022) ===
On May 9, 2019, it was announced that Evans signed a contract with All Elite Wrestling (AEW) where he would reform Los Güeros del Cielo with Angélico, now being billed as The Hybrid2. The team made their debut at AEW's inaugural pay-per-view event Double or Nothing on May 25, losing to Best Friends (Trent Beretta and Chuck Taylor). At Fight for the Fallen on July 13, The Hybrid2 competed in a three-way tag team match against Jungle Boy and Luchasaurus and The Dark Order (Evil Uno and Stu Grayson), which the Dark Order won. At the All Out "Buy In" pre-show on August 31, The Hybrid2 lost to Private Party (Isiah Kassidy and Marq Quen). Evans obtained his first win in AEW on the October 8 episode of AEW Dark, teaming with Angélico and the Lucha Brothers (Fénix and Pentagón Jr.) to defeat Best Friends and Private Party in an eight man tag team match. On the November 26 episode of Dark, Evans unsuccessfully challenged Kenny Omega for the AAA Mega Championship. On April 19, 2022, Evans announced that his contract would expire at the end of April, and that it would not be renewed.

== Other media ==
Evans has appeared in the video game Lucha Libre AAA: Héroes del Ring.

Evans streams on Twitch and spends time in his Discord server hanging out with fans.

== Personal life ==
Evans cites Hayabusa, Great Sasuke, and Blitzkrieg as his main inspirations while growing up.

In November 2003, at ROH's Main Event Spectacles event, Evans was involved in a backstage altercation with Samoa Joe. In March 2009, Evans was involved in a backstage fight with Juventud Guerrera. The fight started when Guerrera was involved in a confrontation with Konnan, and Guerrera claimed that Evans had been working stiff during the match that he and Evans had competed in earlier that night.

Evans is married to a woman named Sandy, who gave birth to their first child, a daughter, on October 21, 2014, and their second, a son, on November 14, 2018.

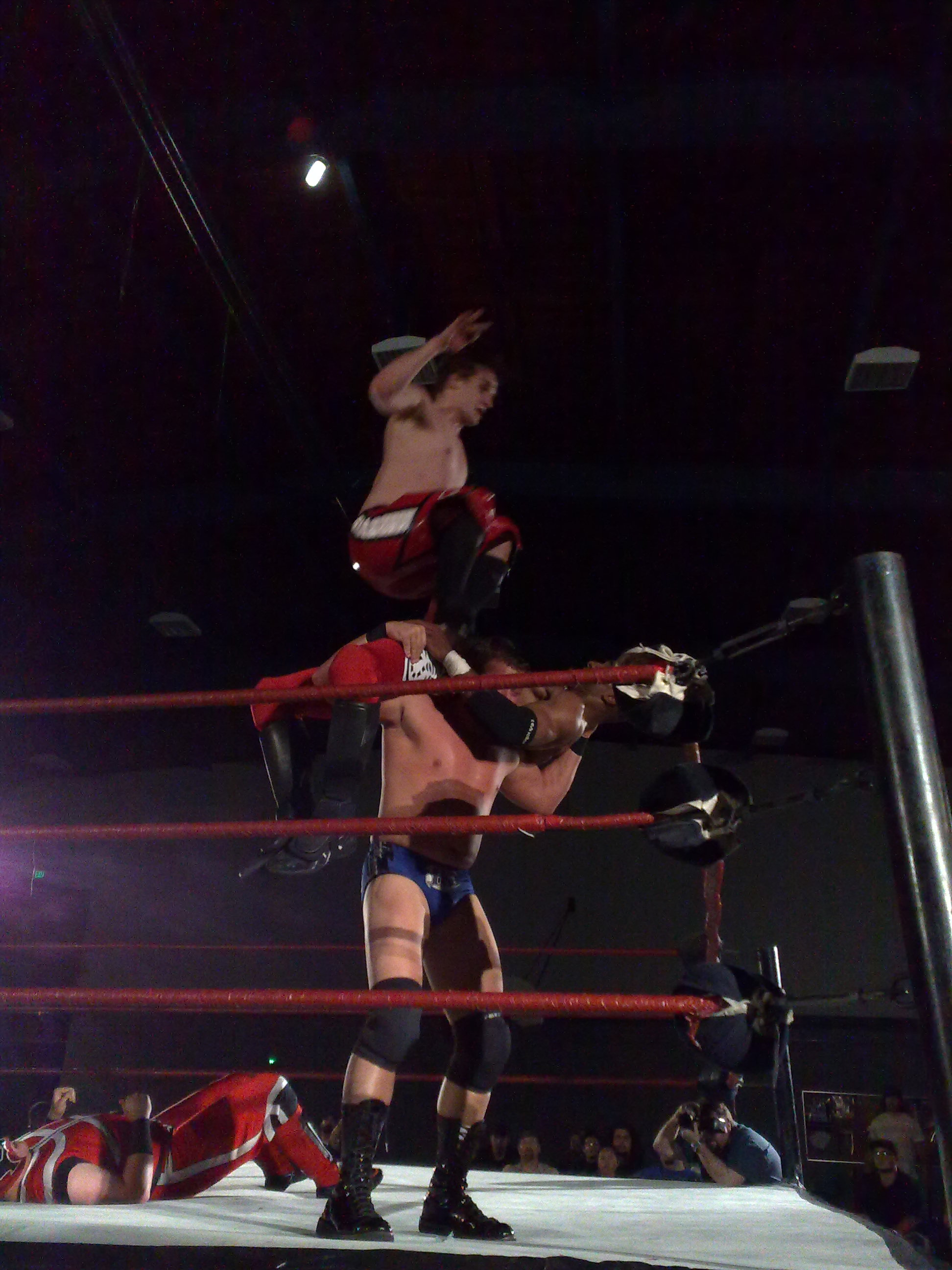
Evans and Roderick Strong performing Ode to the Bulldogs on Scorpio Sky and Ronin

== Championships and accomplishments ==
- Lucha Libre AAA World Wide

- AAA Cruiserweight Championship (1 time)
- AAA World Tag Team Championship (4 times) – with Extreme Tiger (1) and Angélico (3)

- AWA Washington
  - AWA Washington Heavyweight Championship (1 time)
- Dragon Gate
  - Dragon Gate Open the Triangle Gate Championship (1 time) – with CIMA and BxB Hulk
  - Open the Triangle Gate Championship League (2006) – with CIMA and BxB Hulk
- Jersey All Pro Wrestling
  - JAPW Tag Team Championship (1 time) – with Teddy Hart
- Lucha Underground
  - Lucha Underground Trios Championship (1 time) – with Johnny Mundo and P. J. Black
- Pandemonium: Pro Wrestling
  - Pandemonium Gen-Z Championship (1 time, current)
- Pro Wrestling Guerrilla
  - PWG World Tag Team Championship (1 time) – with Roderick Strong
  - Dynamite Duumvirate Tag Team Title Tournament (2008) – with Roderick Strong
- Pro Wrestling Illustrated
  - Ranked No. 113 of the top 500 singles wrestlers in the PWI 500 in 2006
- Pro Wrestling Unplugged
  - PWU Junior Heavyweight Championship (1 time)
- SoCal Uncensored
  - Match of the Year (2006) with Roderick Strong vs. Super Dragon and Davey Richards, March 4, Pro Wrestling Guerrilla
- Canadian Wrestling Hall of Fame
  - Class of 2016

== Luchas de Apuestas record ==
Winner (wager)	Loser (wager)	Location	Event	Date	Notes
Jack Evans (hair) and Angélico (hair)	Dark Cuervo (hair) and Dark Escoria (hair)	Monterrey, Nuevo León	Verano de Escándalo	June 14, 2015	(Note: Steel cage match.)
Bestia 666 (hair)	Jack Evans (hair)	Tijuana, Baja California	The Crash 6th Anniversary show	November 4, 2017	(Note: Tables, Chairs and Lamps match.)
Orange Cassidy (hair)	Jack Evans (hair)	Rochester, New York	AEW Rampage	October 1, 2021	

== Media ==
- Defying Gravity: The Best of Jack Evans – ROH DVD
- Our Time is Now: The Best of Generation Next – ROH DVD
