= Box y Lucha =

Spanish language magazine and website

- Cover of issue 3220 from 2016
- Categories: Pro wrestling and boxing magazine
- Frequency: Biweekly
- Publisher: Latin American Periodicals; EBSCO
- Founded: 1954
- Country: Mexico
- Language: Spanish

Box y Lucha is a Spanish language magazine and website. It is the oldest lucha libre magazine still in existence and one of the first ones to be published. It also covers boxing and other martial arts.

== History ==
The magazine began publication in 1954 in Mexico City under the name Lucha Libre, later renamed Lucha Libre y Box, and finally to Box y Lucha. It became the best established wrestling magazine in Mexico until the 2000s when it was taken over by Súper Luchas. In 1955 the magazine became the first publication to cover the subject of wrestling masks. After the 1990s the magazine and its rival Súper Luchas were the only two Mexican wrestling magazines to survive after the industry, in general, went down. Box y Lucha was known to be more text-based than Súper Luchas and featured less foreign wrestlers. The magazine remained widely read by 1995, which is often regarded as the worst year in professional wrestling history.

== See also ==
- List of professional wrestling magazines
- List of professional wrestling websites
