= Dave Scherer =

American sports writer and journalist

Dave Scherer is an American sports writer and journalist, best known for writing about professional wrestling for the ECW Magazine, New York Daily News, World of Wrestling Magazine, 1Wrestling.com, and founding the newsletter The Wrestling Lariat in 1995, as well as the website PWInsider.com, which he created in 2004 when he left 1Wrestling together with several other reporters.

Scherer played an important part in making Extreme Championship Wrestling noticed in the early 1990s through tape trading and gained a cult following among the hardcore ECW fans at the time when he appeared at the promotions shows. Scherer later recused himself from covering ECW and helped the company in various capacities while still reporting with independent publications. PWInsider is one of the most popular pro wrestling news websites, and has been cited by CBS Sports as perhaps the most trusted source for wrestling news, despite Scherer not being a traditionally trained journalist. The site has also been criticized for its liberal use of advertising, many of which are pop-ups, which has been blamed on Scherer.

== Works ==
- Ryder, Bob; Scherer, Dave (2000). World Championship Wrestling: The Ultimate Guide. Dorling Kindersley. ISBN 978-0789466730.

== See also ==
- List of professional wrestling magazines
- List of professional wrestling websites
- Dirt sheet
