= Solowrestling.com =

Professional wrestling website

- Website type: Professional wrestling news
- Available in: Spanish
- Editor: Sebastián Martínez
- Website: solowrestling.com
- Commercial: Yes

Solowrestling.com is a professional wrestling news website stationed in Spain. It was created by Sebastián Martínez, one of WWE's Spanish-language commentators and former Total Nonstop Action Wrestling commentator. The site is known for its audio show and getting numerous interviews with high-profile personalities in professional wrestling, both Spanish and English speaking. It is the largest Spanish-language professional wrestling news website in the world, surpassing Superluchas.com, the official website of the print magazine Super Luchas. In its native country of Spain the site is also ahead of Superluchas.com, and is there the single largest professional wrestling website overall. The site has also organised wrestling events of its own.

== See also ==
- List of professional wrestling websites
