= Ryan Satin =

American pop culture journalist

Ryan Satin is an American pop culture and professional wrestling journalist. He was a producer for TMZ and founded Pro Wrestling Sheet which reports on professional wrestling and mixed martial arts. He has since left the site and now works for Fox Sports. He is the son of Scott Satin, a Hollywood producer and writer.

== Career ==
After having worked for TMZ for 6 years, Satin left and founded the Pro Wrestling Sheet news site in 2015. In July 2018, Satin sold ProWrestlingSheet.com to Collider. In November 2019, Satin was hired by Fox Sports and began working as a news correspondent on WWE Backstage until the show's cancellation in early 2021. In March 2021, Satin started a weekly podcast called Out of Character where he interviews wrestlers about the stories behind their personas.

=== Controversy ===
In 2019, Satin became the subject of criticism on social media over a story about Sasha Banks and Bayley, stating that they had thrown a temper-tantrum backstage at WrestleMania, in turn leading to rumors spreading that Banks had been "crying on the locker room floor", which both women have denied. Satin has since apologized for the incident.

== Personal life ==
Satin grew up in a Jewish family. Personal issues with Vince Russo resulted in Russo losing his job as a podcaster at his then platform PodcastOne in 2018. According to Russo the head of PodcastOne personally contacted Russo to offer him his show back. Stephen Colletti revealed that Satin was his college roommate freshman year of college at San Francisco State University.

== Awards and nominations ==
In 2017, he was ranked 39th on The Big Lead's list of "40 under 40 most powerful talent in sports media".

Year	Association	Category	Nominated work	Result	Ref.
2014	Daytime Emmy Award	Daytime Emmy Award for Outstanding Entertainment News Program	TMZ on TV	Nominated	

== See also ==
- Dirt sheet
- List of professional wrestling websites
