= Súper Luchas =

Professional wrestling magazine

- Issue cover dated May 2, 2011, featuring El Hijo del Santo
- Categories: Sports magazine
- Frequency: Weekly
- Publisher: PAPSA
- Founded: 1991; 35 years ago
- Country: Mexico
- Based in: Mexico City
- Language: Spanish
- Website: superluchas.com

Súper Luchas is a Spanish-language publication covering professional wrestling originary from Mexico. The publication began as a print magazine in 1991 and later became the largest professional wrestling magazine in the Hispanophone and remained one of the few professional wrestling magazines to survive to the 2000s but now operates mainly as an online website. The website is the number one Spanish-language professional wrestling website in the world.

== History ==
The magazine began publication in 1991 as was published weekly. By the late 1990s, it and the other magazine Box y Lucha were the only two major wrestling magazines left in publication from Mexico. Neither of the two relied on advertisements and survived mainly on money made from circulation. Súper Luchas usually contained less text than Box y Lucha and featured more photographs than interviews or opinion pieces. The magazine would do photo shoots with wrestlers such as Chris Jericho when they traveled to Mexico. During the late 1990s the magazine has employed both freelance reporters who were paid per page and staff writers who were paid a salary each month. The magazine would sometimes reveal the real faces or masked luchadors. In 2010 their official site (at the time Superluchas.net) became one of the three first sites to sell Masked Republic lucha masks legally. The magazine became available for US subscribers in 2012.

Súper Luchas has also promoted wrestling events.

== Critics ==
When Leopoldo Meraz directed Spectacular, the world of wrestling, and later the first era of Super Fights, it was common for timely photos to be published on covers or posters when the fighters were left without a mask in the middle of a fight. He even encouraged his star photographer, Guillermo Mañón, to get this type of graphics, which is why several fighters from the International Wrestling company that organized billboards at El Toreo de Cuatro Caminos threatened Mañón and tried to hit him, as a threat to kill him. Stop taking those pictures. Some of the famous photographs of that period are of fighters such as Villano III, Villano I, El Canek and Ultramán, who appeared without a mask in a poster in tabloid format.

In the month of July 2020, Superluchas.com and the former WWE commentator, Hugo Savinovich, had a controversy because the website published an analysis and opinion note, denying the version given by the former WWE commentator of an alleged kidnapping of WWE Superstars in Saudi Arabia, in November 2019, which generated an important and millionaire lawsuit in a New York court. The former commentator claimed to feel "deeply offended" by the statements that the site mentioned about him, but did not refute the website's analysis of the situation, nor did he reveal any more information about his alleged sources.

== See also ==
- Wrestling Observer Newsletter
- WWE Magazine
- List of professional wrestling magazines
- List of professional wrestling websites
- Professional wrestling in Mexico
