= Fabulous Blitzkrieg =

American former professional wrestler (born 1975)

Blitzkrieg
Personal information
- Born: Jeremiah Ross; August 2, 1975 (age 50) Southern California, U.S.

Professional wrestling career
- Ring name(s): Blitzkrieg; Fabulous Blitzkrieg; Jeremiah Ross
- Billed height: 5 ft 6 in (1.68 m)
- Billed weight: 179 lb (81 kg; 12.8 st)
- Billed from: The Cosmos
- Debut: November 7, 1994
- Retired: December 12, 2004

Jeremiah "Jay" Ross (born August 2, 1975) is an American retired professional wrestler. He is best known under his ring name Fabulous Blitzkrieg (later shortened to Blitzkrieg) and for his appearances with World Championship Wrestling (WCW).

== Professional wrestling career ==
=== Early career (1994–1997) ===
Ross made his professional wrestling debut on November 7, 1994, for All Pro Wrestling (APW) under the ring name Fabulous Blitzkrieg, where he took part in a tag team match with Hellblazer in a losing effort to Mr. Excitement and Suicide Kid. After the loss, Ross tweaked his ring name to simply Blitzkrieg and began feuding with Hellblazer, which culminated at APW's event Mini Invasion as Blitzkrieg and Super Dragon defeated Hellblazer and American Wild Child in a tag team match on August 15, 1997.

=== World Championship Wrestling (1998–1999) ===
After officially signing a contract with WCW, Blitzkrieg made his debut for the company in a dark match on the July 16, 1998 episode of Thunder, where he and Super Dragon defeated Blitzkrieg's former rival American Wild Child and Dragon Yakuza. On January 27, 1999, Blitzkrieg appeared on the first and only Festival de Lucha special, where he competed in and won two six-man tag team matches. Blitzkrieg then made his televised debut against Rey Mysterio, Jr. on the February 8 episode of Nitro, where he was defeated. Over the next few months, he wrestled in the company's cruiserweight division against fellow cruiserweights Juventud Guerrera, Billy Kidman, Dean Malenko, Super Caló, and Silver King. Blitzkrieg later faced Guerrera in a rematch at Spring Stampede to determine the number one contender for the Cruiserweight Championship, although Guererra managed to defeat Blitzkrieg after performing a Juvi Driver from the top rope, thus securing the title shot. Despite this, Blitzkrieg took part in a four-way match for the Cruiserweight Title against Guererra, Psicosis and the champion Mysterio Jr. on the April 19 episode of Nitro, which was won by Psicosis after he pinned Blitzkrieg. After Mysterio, Jr. later reclaimed the Cruiserweight Title, Blitzkrieg wrestled him for the title on the July 1 episode of Thunder, but was unable to win the championship. Blitzkrieg then competed at house shows over the next few months before wrestling Evan Karagias on the September 20 episode of Nitro to determine the number one contender for the Cruiserweight Championship, but was defeated. Following this, Ross retired from wrestling on October 14 in order to begin working full-time as a computer technician. However, his final match was broadcast a week later on the October 21 episode of Thunder, where he and Kaz Hayashi lost to Juventud Guerrera and Silver King. He would retire from wrestling.

=== Later career (2004) ===
On December 12, 2004, at a Pro Wrestling WAR event in California, Ross cemented his retirement when he allowed Jack Evans, who was inspired by Ross to become a professional wrestler, to assume his Blitzkrieg gimmick and attire. As a result, Evans competed as Blitzkrieg II for a short time thereafter out of respect for Ross but retired the gimmick after suffering an injury from a botched move.

Since retiring, Ross works as a registered nurse in Austin, Texas.

== Championships and accomplishments ==
- Pro Wrestling Illustrated
  - PWI ranked him No. 99 of the top 500 singles wrestlers in the PWI 500 in 1999
- Wrestling Observer Newsletter
  - Rookie of the Year (1999)
