= Dirt sheet =

Professional wrestling term

In the English speaking professional wrestling culture, a "dirt sheet" is a wrestling magazine, wrestling newsletter or website that covers professional wrestling from a real-life perspective as opposed to treating the storylines as real. Another term sometimes used for these publications is "rag sheet."

== Reputation ==
Many wrestlers in the past resented so-called "dirt sheets" since they felt that they ruined the business by breaking kayfabe, i.e. exposing professional wrestling as staged. However, second-generation wrestler Bret Hart recalls that many wrestlers themselves were avid readers of the magazines in his youth because they too wanted to keep up with the backstage news; other people such as wrestling journalists have backed up that this was the case in the past. Wrestler Steve Austin often saw wrestling newsletters passed around the locker room when he started out in the industry. In the 21st century, some people in the industry, such as Vince Russo, Bruce Prichard and Eric Bischoff, still think that such publications hurt the wrestling business, as well as ruin the fans' immersion and enjoyment. Some wrestlers have themselves written for news websites, e.g. Matt Hardy for 411Mania. Chris Jericho created his own called Web Is Jericho.

== Media outlets ==
- Wrestling Observer Newsletter (WON), often considered the first "dirt sheet", created and run by Dave Meltzer
- Pro Wrestling Torch (PWTorch), created and run by Wade Keller
- Pro Wrestling Insider (PWInsider), created and run by Dave Scherer
- Pro Wrestling Sheet, created and run by Ryan Satin.
- Wrestling News World (WNW)

== See also ==
- Glossary of professional wrestling terms
- The Dirt Sheet, a wrestling web series
