= Best of World Championship Wrestling =

- Best of World Championship Wrestling bumper (1985–1987)
- Created by: Georgia Championship Wrestling / Jim Crockett Promotions
- Starring: See World Championship Wrestling alumni
- Country of origin: United States

Production
- Production location: WTBS' studios at 1050 Techwood Drive in Atlanta, Georgia
- Camera setup: Multicamera setup
- Running time: 60 minutes per episode

Original release
- Network: TBS
- Release: 1973 – 1987

Best of World Championship Wrestling (a.k.a. Best of Championship Wrestling) is an hour-long show, that was the Sunday evening edition of TBS' Saturday night wrestling shows, Georgia Championship Wrestling and NWA World Championship Wrestling. The rights to Best of World Championship Wrestling now belong to World Wrestling Entertainment (WWE).

== Early years ==
Best of World Championship Wrestling began in the 1970s to complement GCW, which by 1984 had been renamed World Championship Wrestling. It became inactive shortly after Vince McMahon bought GCW on July 14, 1984 (a.k.a. Black Saturday). When McMahon sold the Saturday Night time slot to Jim Crockett Promotions, the Sunday edition of World Championship Wrestling was resurrected, first as Best of Championship Wrestling and later as Best of World Championship Wrestling. However, airings of Sunday editions became infrequent due to TBS' coverage of the Atlanta Braves and the Atlanta Hawks.

== Format ==
BoWCW's format was essentially a magazine format, mainly featuring recaps of matches which had previously aired on other related programming. In addition, Bill Apter, then of Pro Wrestling Illustrated, had a sit-down interview segment called the PWI Scouting Report. During the show's GCW years, the show was hosted solo by Freddie Miller. During the show's JCP years, it was hosted solo by Tony Schiavone.

== Notable angles ==
One of the most-remembered wrestling angles to air on this show was the announcement of then-NWA president Bob Geigel stripping Magnum T. A. of the NWA U.S. Heavyweight Title for "conduct unbecoming a champion" due to Magnum clotheslining Geigel after Geigel reprimanded him for an attack on Nikita Koloff. This set up the famous "best-of-seven" wrestling series to fill the title vacancy. Koloff defeated Magnum 4–3 to win the vacant title.

The show also (during its GCW days) featured Tommy Rich as NWA World Heavyweight Champion during his short reign as champion (possibly the only videotape showing him with the belt) and also the announcement of Magnum T. A.'s car accident and an address to send get well cards and letters.

== Cancellation ==
In early 1988, Ted Turner expressed interest in a new Sunday evening wrestling show which featured original matches. Turner got his wish when NWA Main Event debuted to strong ratings. In November 1988, Jim Crockett Promotions was sold to Turner, who renamed the organization World Championship Wrestling.
