= Kevin Kleinrock =

American professional wrestling producer

Kevin Kleinrock is an American executive producer, writer, director, consultant, and business developer. He is currently the President of and executive producer for lucha libre focused enterprise Masked Republic which produces Pay Per View events under the name "Viva La Lucha", live shows, multiple clothing lines, publishes a monthly English language lucha libre zine called Rudo Can't Fail, manages monthly lucha libre subscription box service Lucha Loot. The company is also in the process of developing multiple properties for television, film, and stage. He is the former producer of Xtreme Pro Wrestling. He is also the co-creator, producer and head booker of Wrestling Society X which aired on MTV and additional networks worldwide. In the wake of WSX, Kevin was ranked in the Pro Wrestling Torch Most Influential People In Wrestling list. Kevin currently consults with various wrestling, mixed martial arts and other live event and sports/entertainment related producers on production and monetization of content. Masked Republic and Kleinrock's Stone-Rock Entertainment company (founded with actor/producer Stu Stone) created and produced a pilot for a lucha related live Vegas show called Lucha Las Vegas.

== Professional wrestling career ==
=== California independent circuit ===
Kleinrock's career in wrestling began at the age of 16 when he went to work for Slammers Wrestling Federation (SWF) based out of Sun Valley, California. Kleinrock performed various roles with the SWF including time keeper, ring announcer, program writer, and even brought Slammers to his high school for a fundraiser wrestling show. While working at Slammers, he became friends with Darren McMillan who wrestled as Dynamite D. In 1996, Kleinrock and Slammers parted ways when he headed off to college at University of California, Los Angeles (UCLA). Shortly thereafter, McMillan and a number of other wrestlers who had left Slammers over the years formed tho Dynamite Wrestling Organization, and after an unscripted shoot angle on an SWF show, the Slammers roster split. McMillan, along with former Slammers referee Patrick Hernandez and Kleinrock, formed Southern California Championship Wrestling (SCCW).

SCCW promoted mostly fundraiser events throughout Los Angeles including "SlamFest '98" which was held at UCLA in conjunction with the Alpha Epsilon Pi fraternity (of which Kleinrock was a member) with proceeds going to the Make-A-Wish Foundation. In the main event, SCCW's Sheriff Jess Hansen teamed with Yokozuna as they battled Cincinnati Red and The Honky Tonk Man.

Shows, however, were generally promoted by the wrestlers and staff handing out flyers themselves at local wrestling events. At one local World Wrestling Entertainment (WWE) event, a flyer was handed to the CEO of Extreme Associates, Rob Black. Black had been in negotiations with Paul Heyman and Extreme Championship Wrestling (ECW) to co-promote West Coast shows and distribute ECW DVDs in Brazil (where Black co-owned a distribution company). He called McMillan and requested a meeting to discuss the Los Angeles wrestling scene SCCW. As a result, the SCCW folded, and McMillan, Hernandez, and Kleinrock worked with Black to form a new wrestling company, Xtreme Pro Wrestling (XPW).

Kleinrock was the vice president of XPW, as well as taking on the role of an on-screen antagonist where he played right-hand man to XPW CEO Rob Black in most of the series 130 plus episodes. He was affiliated with Black's Black Army and was nicknamed "Dork-o Dude" by XPW commentator Kris Kloss.

=== Big Vision Entertainment ===
After the closure of XPW, Kleinrock worked for Houston Curtis' Big Vision Entertainment company. As a former MTV employee, Curtis was able to obtain an interview with the broadcaster for discussions as to creating a show. At the meeting Kleinrock put over a vision of a program combining music and professional wrestling in a format to appeal to the 18 to 24 male demographic, as well as MTV's existing audience. The pilot show for the newly dubbed Wrestling Society X (WSX) was filmed in February 2006 and accepted by MTV. The short-lived weekly television series aired on MTV, MTV2, MTV Tr3s, MTV UK, and over a dozen other MTV outlets throughout the world.

In May 2008, Kleinrock served as executive producer and head writer for XPW's "Cold Day In Hell" reunion show. The event drew the largest crowd for any non-lucha libre independent wrestling show in Southern California since the original XPW. In July 2009, Kleinrock served as executive producer for XPW's "XPW X" 10-year anniversary show.

Big Vision also was involved with NWA Championship Wrestling from Hollywood, an "old school" TV studio show produced with the National Wrestling Alliance. Kleinrock served as an executive producer and writer for the program in its original form but is not currently involved with the series airing on KDOC in Los Angeles. Kleinrock also worked on a number of non-wrestling related programs while at Big Vision including CBS Sports' The Ultimate Blackjack Tour, a pilot for TruTV based on the East Bay Rats motorcycle club out of Oakland, CA, and the first ever animated Cheech & Chong movie Cheech and Chong's Animated Movie.

==== Ultimate Insiders DVDs ====
While at Big Vision, Kleinrock created and executive produced dozens of pro wrestling and MMA related DVDs the most popular of which was the Pro Wrestling's Ultimate Insiders DVD line. Releases in the series included Vince Russo and Ed Ferrara: Inside The WWF (2005), Vince Russo and Ed Ferrara: Inside WCW (2005), One-On-One With Vince & Ed (2005), The Hardy Boys: From The Backyard To The Big Time (2006), Matt Hardy: Behind the Controversies (2006), Jeff Hardy: Unwrapping The Enigma (2006), Doin' Time With New Jack (2007), and Last Call with Raven and Sandman (2008). The series was the first pro wrestling related series to have Direct Response television (infomercial) spots air to sell them.

==== Bankruptcy of Big Vision Entertainment and XPW ====
Big Vision largely ceased trading after its main distributor went bankrupt, this led to Big Vision having no way of selling its products, including XPW related products.

=== After Big Vision ===
While still consulting with Big Vision on a project by project basis, Kleinrock opened his own marketing, management, merchandising and consulting company Worldwide Personified, in January 2010. In early 2010 Kevin served as supervising producer on the Bischoff-Hervey Entertainment produced midget wrestling pilot for TruTV. When the series was picked up for a full season, he was brought back as a segment producer. Kleinrock also consulted for the A&E series Strange Days with Bob Saget on their pro wrestling related episode which aired in December 2010.

Kleinrock's main focus has become Masked Republic for wrestling/lucha related projects and the early 2011 formation of Stone-Rock Entertainment for additional non-wrestling related projects. In January 2011, Masked Republic produced a TV pilot called Lucha Las Vegas. The company also had a Pay Per View series called Viva La Lucha which produced new episodes bi-monthly from mid-2010 to mid-2011. DVDs of some of the PPVs are available in stores in the U.S. and Canada. Masked Republic also has an apparel line and has had at least one design available in Urban Outfitters stores. All of Masked Republic's merchandise is available through their online store LuchaShop.com. In early 2012 it was announced that Masked Republic was now representing the AAA Lucha Libre company for international television. According to the Masked Republic website, they have other television series in the works including Liga De Lucha, LLU, Viva L.A. Lucha, Heroes Enmascarados, and a show that is referred to most places as The Manny Peeples Show. Masked Republic also uses the Bell Gardens based Santino Bros. Wrestling Academy and the San Jose-based Pro Wrestling Revolution Wrestling Academy and their PWR promotion as "development" programs for their lucha based TV programs.

In June 2011 Kleinrock also became supervising producer of a new wrestling league called the Urban Wrestling Federation which was launched as a brand existing only on Pay-Per-View and owned by former ECW managing partner Steve Karel. Kleinrock was a writer and producer for the initial PPV taping which took place at the Hammerstein Ballroom in New York City on June 3. Three events were taped that night and the debuted on Pay Per View on Sunday, June 26. The concept behind Urban Wrestling is to combine hip hop recording stars as the leaders of different factions who fight in the ring but also on the street and feud over drugs and money.

In April 2012, Kleinrock was revealed to be one of the people behind "5 Guys Wrestling," a company launching a brand of wrestling called Extreme Reunion (changed in May 2012 to Extreme Rising) to fill a void left by the demise of ECW and provide a more realistic and "non-PG" approach to pro wrestling.

In June 2012, Kleinrock revealed, via his Facebook page, that he had been, managing the launch of a 24/7 Anime channel called Neon Alley which is owned by VIZ Media. In April 2014, Neon Alley transitioned from a self-contained app and website to a channel on Hulu. In 2016, Kleinrock was named Director of Digital Operations & Partner Development for VIZ Media.

== Personal life ==
Kleinrock has two children who both have a rare genetic disorder called Angelman syndrome. Kleinrock has plans to start a non-profit to aid in awareness and proper diagnosis of the disorder as well as provide grants to families who need assistance for Angelman syndrome-related expenses including durable medical equipment and time off of work. Masked Republic has participated in fundraising efforts previously for the Foundation for Angelman Syndrome Therapeutics, the American Diabetes Association and the American Cancer Society. Kleinrock continues his humanitarian efforts towards fundraising for Angelman Syndrome Foundation research and supportive services in 2018, while planning his marriage to long-time girlfriend Merilisse Beyelia. They got married on June 25th, 2018 in Pleasanton, CA, and had longtime friend, and current WWE producer Ryan Katz as their wedding officiant
