= Masked Republic =

Professional wrestling website

Masked Republic is a website and media company that specializes in professional wrestling merchandise, ranging from wrestling masks, toys, clothes and comic books. It is the largest seller of lucha libre related products and has also created its own wrestling Pay-per-views. The company also has a charity division. It is run by founder and CEO Ruben Zamora, and President and COO Kevin Kleinrock.

== See also ==
- Professional wrestling in Mexico
- List of professional wrestling websites
