= Bob Ryder =

American professional wrestling journalist (1956–2020)

- Born: October 22, 1956
- Died: November 24, 2020 (aged 64)
- Known for: Founding Total Nonstop Action Wrestling

Bob Ryder (October 22, 1956 – November 24, 2020) was an American professional wrestling journalist and one of the founders of Total Nonstop Action Wrestling (TNA, then NWA: Total Nonstop Action).

== Biography ==
Ryder had been an innovator in the online wrestling community as he was the head of Prodigy's professional wrestling area. During this time, he became the first person to conduct an online interview for the World Wrestling Federation (WWF, now WWE), when he interviewed Kevin Nash and Shawn Michaels during WrestleMania XI in 1995. He was also the founder of 1Wrestling.com and the webmaster for Extreme Championship Wrestling's website.

During the Monday Night War, Ryder worked for World Championship Wrestling (WCW), having been close friends with WCW President Eric Bischoff. While working for WCW, Ryder co-hosted the WCW Live internet program with Jeremy Borash.

Concerned about a WWF monopoly in the professional wrestling industry after the fall of WCW, Ryder convinced Jeff and Jerry Jarrett to start a pay-per-view exclusive promotion in what would become the Total Nonstop Action Wrestling (NWA-TNA, later Impact Wrestling) territory of the National Wrestling Alliance (NWA). Ryder was TNA's first employee and became the company's longest tenured employee in history, being employed from its launch in 2002 until his death in 2020. He held multiple positions in the company, including working as their Director of Travel Operations.

== Death ==
During the last few years of his life, Ryder battled multiple myeloma. During his battle with cancer, he maintained his position in Impact Wrestling and worked from home while undergoing chemotherapy. Ryder was initially given three to six months to live but eventually saw his cancer go into remission. However, his cancer returned and he was found dead in his Nashville home on November 25, 2020, at the age of 64.

== Legacy ==
In a statement released after his death, Impact Wrestling referred to him as the "heart and soul of the promotion." Bill Apter closed 1Wrestling.com in Ryder's honor after his death. He was inducted posthumously into the TNA Hall of Fame class of 2024.

== Accomplishments ==
- Total Nonstop Action Wrestling
  - TNA Hall of Fame (2024)

== Works ==
- Ryder, Bob; Scherer, Dave (2000). World Championship Wrestling: The Ultimate Guide. Dorling Kindersley. ISBN 978-0789466730.
