= Earl Oliver =

American writer, musician, variety and street entertainer

- Born: June 23, 1948 (age 78); Indianapolis, Indiana, United States
- Occupations: Writer, musician, variety and street entertainer
- Spouse: Lonna Oliver (c. 1974–present)
- Relatives: wrestler Ray "Rip the Crippler" Oliver (uncle)
- Writing career
- Genre: Professional wrestling
- Website: earloliver.com

Earl Oliver (born June 23, 1948) is an American writer, musician, variety, street entertainer, and graphic artist. An accomplished blues and jazz guitarist and singer in Northern California and the San Francisco Bay Area, popularly known as the Walkin' Blues Man, he hosted a popular cable-access television program, "Earl Oliver & Friends: Live from LaVal's", later called "Live on Location", that aired in 16 stations throughout the region from 1992 to 1995. He has also been the lead vocalist for several California-based bands, most recently, the Groovinators.

From May 2005 until August 2013, Oliver was a regular performer on the Skunk Train, a heritage railway which runs daily from Fort Bragg and Willits, California, and at events such as the Palo Alto Art Walk and Project Read for the San Francisco Public Library. In 2001, he was called "one of San Francisco's undiscovered treasures" by San Francisco Arts Magazine.

The nephew of professional wrestler Ray "Rip the Crippler" Oliver, Oliver is a longtime wrestling columnist and historian. He is perhaps best known in the internet wrestling community as the founder of Solie's Vintage Wrestling, a historical professional wrestling website dedicated to the memory of announcer Gordon Solie, which is the oldest continually active pro wrestling website on the internet.

== Biography ==
=== Early life and career ===
Earl Oliver was born in Indianapolis, Indiana, but later moved with his family to Southern California. At age 14, Oliver began playing as a professional musician and in 1969 moved to the San Francisco Bay Area, where he performed at local jazz and rock music night clubs such as The Melting Pot, La Bohème, The Vintner, Family Farmacy, and the Seventh Seal Coffee-House by the early-1970s. While studying music, he was given singing lessons from one-time Metropolitan Opera diva Margo Weiss. He also became involved in stage acting within a few years with memorable performances in Bye Bye Birdie, George M! and Don't Drink the Water at the Glendale Center, as well performing as a magician at The Magic Castle. In 1977, he portrayed the "evil sorcerer" in Aladdin at Pamela and Walter Gilmore's Golden Mall Playhouse. Around this time, he began producing a variety show, The Showcase, which included musicians, singers, comics, clowns, fire eaters, poetry readers and other entertainers. It was very successful on the night club circuit, being regularly featured at the Horn in Santa Monica, and received praise from the LA Weekly in July 1979.

=== Music and television career ===
In the 1980s, Oliver returned to the music scene finding limited success with the bands JUMP CITY and The Sphere. He also entered the recording business producing radio advertisements for local camera stores and shoe emporiums, doing voice overs and writing advertising jingles. Also during this time, he began developing the stage persona of "a blues shouting, guitar playing" singer called the "Walkin' Blues Man". The character would become a familiar sight at countless parades, music and art festivals, county fairs, farmers markets and other outdoor events throughout the West Coast of the United States and in Canada for the next 20 years.

By the end of the decade, Oliver had also developed a unique variety act by incorporating magic into his musical performances, such as draping a scarf over his guitar at the end of his set and making it disappear, which was favorably reviewed by the San Fernando Valley Daily News in October 1989. In 1992, Oliver began producing a monthly cable-access television program, "Earl Oliver & Friends: Live from LaVal's", later called "Live on Location", which featured variety acts at La Val's Subterranean basement club. The show became very popular in San Francisco and was eventually broadcast in 16 stations throughout the region until 1995.

=== Internet writing ===
Oliver held a number of entertainment and music-related occupations throughout his life including as a disk jockey, carnival barker, broadcast journalist, answering service operator, voice artist, and ring announcer. However, he was primarily employed as a graphic production artist and later, with rise of the internet during the 1990s, as a web designer and corporate trainer.

As a young man, he developed an interest in professional wrestling, being the nephew of Rip "The Crippler" Oliver, and was especially a fan of famed Championship Wrestling from Florida play-by-play announcer Gordon Solie. In 1995, Oliver started a website in his honor, Solie's Vintage Wrestling, dedicated to the history of professional wrestling. It was the first of its kind at the time of its opening and remains the oldest professional wrestling website still active. He was also the editor of the weekly Solie's Wrestling Newsletter from 1996 to 2003.

In addition to Solie's Vintage Wrestling, Oliver has also occasionally contributed to WrestlingClassics.com and was later interviewed in The Wrestling Channel Radio Network's first original production Jeremy Hartley's Up Close and Personal. In 1999, he publicly criticized SLAM! Wrestling columnist Eric Benner for a controversial article on the Hart family following the ring death of Owen Hart. He was occasionally in contact with Solie, who later endorsed the website, shortly before his death in 2000 and was quoted by both wrestling websites and the mainstream media upon the publishing of Solie's biography Gordon Solie: Something Left Behind five years later.

=== Recent years ===
In 2001, he was called "one of San Francisco's undiscovered treasures" by San Francisco Arts Magazine. In October 2003 he moved to Fort Bragg, California where Oliver and his wife Lonna settled in a 90-year-old farmhouse. After being laid off from IKON Office Solutions' Print on Demand Division in 2005, Oliver left the corporate world to become a full-time musician and writer. In his familiar "Walkin' Blues Man" act, he has appeared at such civic events such as the Palo Alto Art Walk and Project Read for the San Francisco Public Library. He has been a regular performer on the Skunk Train, a heritage railway running between Fort Bragg and Willits, California, and was on hand with Greg Schindel, The Trainsinger and The Black Bart Gunfighters to celebrate its 120th anniversary.

Oliver also formed a partnership with Mendocino Coast music legend, Butch Kwan, releasing the Skunk Train Blues album, and performed together for over two years appearing at the 2004 and 2006 Caspar World Folk Festival, "Art in the Gardens" at the North Coast Botanical Gardens, and headlined the 12th annual "Local Licks Live" concert sponsored by KOZT 95.3 FM. Beginning in 2005, they were regular performers at Fort Bragg's annual "World's Largest Salmon BarBQ". In recent years, he has revisited several of these events as the lead vocalist for The Groovinators.

On May 8, 2010, and again on May 26, 2012, Oliver sang with the Symphony of the Redwoods during their annual POPS Benefit Concerts. At the 2012 concert, Earl was asked to perform with the orchestra for the finale of the show, a "Tribute to Old Blues Eyes" medley of Frank Sinatra hits.

== Solie's Vintage Wrestling ==
Oliver launched Solie's Vintage Wrestling, a historical professional wrestling website, in 1995, named in honor of announcer Gordon Solie, and one of the earliest known pro wrestling website on the internet. It had a number of innovative features, most notably, the most extensive collection of wrestling title histories on the internet. It was also home to "Solie's Wrestling Newsletter", which Oliver edited, and all 753 editions were put online following the end of its run in November 2003. Solie.org is considered a valued reference among wrestling fans and the internet wrestling community. As of 2010, it is the oldest continually active pro wrestling website on the internet.

- Storefront: Professional wrestling memorabilia, usually DVD releases, personally recommended by Earl Oliver.
- Title Histories: One of the largest collections of championship title histories from over 300 promotions throughout the 20th and early 21st century.
- Wrestling Forums: A listing of major pro wrestling-related internet forums. The website had its own official forum from 1996 to 2000.
- Newsletter: An archive of "Solie's Wrestling Newsletter" from 1996 to 2003.
- Images: A photo gallery of snapshots, publicity photos, newspaper and magazine articles, and other memorabilia of the Television era from the personal collections of Joe Wolfe, Marc Friedland, Dixie Moulton and Earl Oliver.
- Articles: A collection of pro-wrestling related magazine and newspaper articles from wrestling columnists from throughout the country. These include stories from The Charlotte Observer, the Dallas Observer, the Los Angeles Times, the Miami Herald, the New York Post and Sports Illustrated.
- Interviews: Exclusive interviews with many professional wrestlers from the 1980s and 90s wrestling boom. These were later transcribed from various television, radio and internet interviews for "Solie's Wrestling Newsletter".
- Rosters: A complete roster listing of World Championship Wrestling and the World Wrestling Federation from 1986 to 1998, from the United States Wrestling Association for 1997, and Extreme Championship Wrestling from 1997 to 1998.
- Wrestlers' Win/Loss Records: A compilation of win–loss records from every wrestler competing in WCW from 1990 to 1999, and the WWF from 1987 to 1999.
- A-List: A listing of websites recommended by Earl Oliver which range from a variety of wrestling-related subjects including journalism, history, statistics and research, official websites for promotions, schools, wrestlers and photography and video resources.
- Awards: A section of the website which showcases awards and reviews received by Solie.org during its early years.
- The Illustrated History of the Four Horsemen: An extensive 21-part series detailing the history of first three incarnations of the Four Horsemen from 1985 to 1992.

== Uncle Earl's Classic TV Channel ==
Oliver created Uncle Earl's Classic TV Channel in early 2010 in conjunction with his work at Mendocino Coast Television (MCTV), the cable access (PEG) TV station in Fort Bragg, CA. The Uncle Earl site is a free repository of streaming classic television programs and movies, organized in an easily navigated library format.

== Discography ==
- The Walkin' Blues Man! (2004)
- Skunk Train Blues (2005)
- Music of the Spheres (2007)
- Groovinators (2010)
- Groovinators at the 2011 World's Largest Salmon BBQ (2011)
- Song for Ella: The Jazz Collection (2014)
- Dinner & A Song: Earl Oliver Live (2016)
