= Bill Apter =

American journalist and photographer

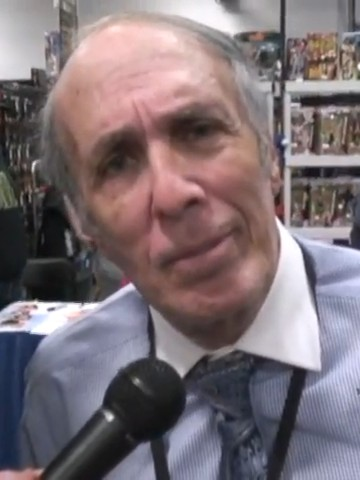
- Apter in 2013
- Born: William Stanley Apter; October 22, 1945 (age 81); The Bronx, New York, U.S.
- Occupations: Pro Wrestling journalist; photographer
- Spouse: Andrea Apter (m. 1982)
- Children: 2
- Writing career
- Period: 1970–present
- Subject: Professional wrestling

William Stanley Apter (born October 22, 1945) is an American journalist and photographer specializing in professional wrestling. He was an editorial staff member and photographer for several magazines during the 1970s, 1980s and 1990s, notably Pro Wrestling Illustrated. These magazines often reported wrestling in kayfabe, focusing on the storylines and angles rather than reporting "backstage" goings on. Apter was so closely associated with these magazines that they were often known as "Apter Mags". The influence of these publications in the days before cable television and the Internet was such that Apter has been credited with launching the careers of many young wrestlers whom he featured on magazine covers.

== 1970s ==
=== Working for Stanley Weston ===
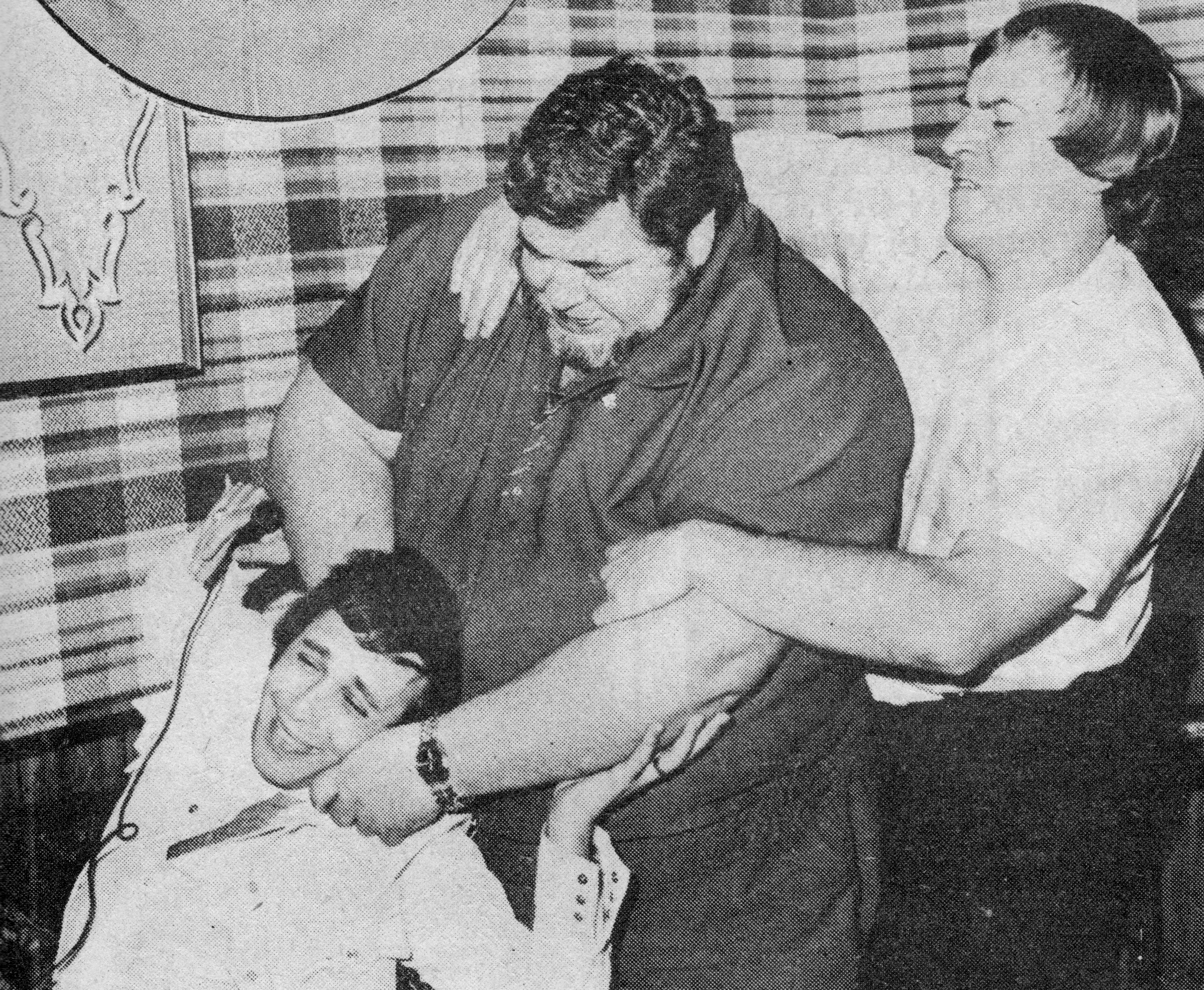
Apter is attacked during a kayfabe interview with manager George "Crybaby" Cannon in 1975. Referee Tommy Young attempts to intervene.

Bill Apter made his debut as a writer in January 1970, writing for his first employer in publishing Stanley Weston (who he also credits as his mentor). He became a reporter, writer and photographer for several wrestling and boxing magazines published by Weston, including The Wrestler and Inside Wrestling. He was eventually promoted to the senior editor spot at Weston's wrestling publications.

== 1980s–1990s ==
=== Pro Wrestling Illustrated ===
The publications Apter worked for were directed at the common fan and usually operated under the premise that professional wrestling was not scripted or predetermined. The editors of the magazines had the mentality that they were covering wrestling the way Sports Illustrated covers other sports. In 1991, Apter began to regularly help compile the PWI 500, a detailed ranking of the top 500 wrestlers in the world. Pro Wrestling Illustrated has published the list every year since its inception. Apter worked for PWI until 1999, when he accepted the editorship of WOW Magazine. The publication folded in 2001.

=== Television and video ===
Apter hosted a television segment called the PWI Scouting Report on Jim Crockett's NWA Best of World Championship Wrestling, a weekly WTBS show. He hosted several dozen other TV segments, including for the nationally syndicated Pro Wrestling This Week TV news magazine. In 1985, Apter was also the co-host (alongside Gordon Solie) of pro wrestling's first commercial home video, Pro Wrestling Illustrated presents Lords of the Ring: Superstars & Superbouts.

=== Friendship with Andy Kaufman ===
Apter was friends with actor and comedian Andy Kaufman. Kaufman had been a fan of professional wrestling since childhood and visited Apter one evening at his New York apartment to discuss his aspirations of entering the wrestling ring. Kaufman told Apter of his love for the profession and his admiration for Buddy Rogers, who he wanted to emulate. Apter was taken by Kaufman's passion for wrestling and put him in touch with Jerry Lawler, who Apter thought could help set up an in-ring angle. Apter called Lawler at 1am and told him Kaufman's story. Lawler was initially skeptical, finding it hard to believe that a celebrity like Andy Kaufman was sitting in Apter's apartment at 1am, but he eventually spoke to Kaufman on the phone to confirm this and put together their now famous angle. The rivalry between Kaufman and Lawler became one of the most memorable of the 1980s in professional wrestling and achieved significant mainstream attention, including a famous confrontation on a 1982 episode of Late Night with David Letterman Apter has stated that the rivalry between Lawler and Kaufman, which blurred the lines between reality and entertainment, "was the start of what we know as sports entertainment today."

== 2000s–present ==
=== Internet journalism and return to magazine writing ===
Apter operated 1Wrestling.com, where he worked as an editor, writer, and video interviewer. He has been a feature columnist for Fighting Spirit magazine and contributor to the Italian wrestling magazine called "Tutto Wrestling Magazine" in a section called "Apter's Alley." In 2008, Apter made his return to the Pro Wrestling Illustrated family of magazines as a freelancer in Volume 20 of The Wrestler with a 90-minute question and answer session with Tammy Sytch. Later, he also conducted an interview with Nick Bockwinkel for the magazine. In 2012–2013, Apter worked sporadically for WWE. He appeared on shows that were produced for the WWE Network and wrote several articles as a contributor for WWE.com. His first article for WWE.com was in January 2014, regarding the day Bruno Sammartino lost his WWE Championship. In December 2020, Apter announced the closure of 1Wrestling.com due to the death of its creator, Bob Ryder, and stated he would be working at vocnation.com.

Apter's autobiography was released on October 1, 2015. Published by ECW Press, the book the titled "Is Wrestling Fixed? I Didn't Know It Was Broken!" and has taken Apter across the United States and to Europe for book signings and to perform his one-man-show based on the book. In November 2016, Apter began a podcast utilizing the book title. In September 2020 Apter was signed as a columnist for the new United Kingdom based "Inside The Ropes" wrestling magazine. It is produced as an actual magazine and digitally as well. In December 2021 Apter signed with Sportskeeda.com as Senior Editor. He writes columns, does video interviews, and mentors other staff with his publishing knowledge from his days at 1wrestling.com.

=== Recognition in the 2000s–2010s ===
In 2015 he speculated that the Benoit murders were possibly a professional hit.

Apter has received praise and recognition for his work. In December 2016, he was honored at Pennsylvania's Keystone State Wrestling Alliance with a proclamation from Governor Tom Wolf commending his lifetime work in the pro wrestling business as well as his humanitarian work at the non-profit AHEDD, assisting persons with disabilities to find competitive employment. On that same day the Mayor of Pittsburgh, Bill Peduto, declared December 3, 2016 "Bill Apter Day." He has been inducted into various professional wrestling Halls of Fame, including the Pittsburgh Pro Wrestling Hall of Fame (class of 2017), St. Louis Wrestling Hall of Fame (class of 2015) and the George Tragos/Lou Thesz Professional Wrestling Hall of Fame (2012's James C. Melby Award recipient)

=== The Apter Chat podcast ===
In 2018, Apter reconnected with longtime friend Josh Shernoff for a series of YouTube videos. After receiving positive feedback on the pairing, the duo decided to launch a new podcast. The Apter Chat Podcast debuted in August, 2018 with the first part of a controversial two-part interview with Hulk Hogan. Hogan's comments in that interview made headlines throughout the wrestling world and generated thousands of Twitter comments. Since that time, Apter and Shernoff have interviewed many top stars from the past and present of the wrestling industry, including Tazz, "Million Dollar Man" Ted Dibiase, Sting, Naomi, Rey Mysterio, Jerry Lawler, and Jim Cornette. The podcast features the aforementioned interviews, along with discussions between Apter and Shernoff about the week's top wrestling headlines, classic Apter interviews recordings, guest segments and Q&A. Apter and Shernoff presented their 2018 Male Wrestler of the Year award to Cody Rhodes and their 2018 Tag Team of the Year award to The Young Bucks.

=== Gallery ===
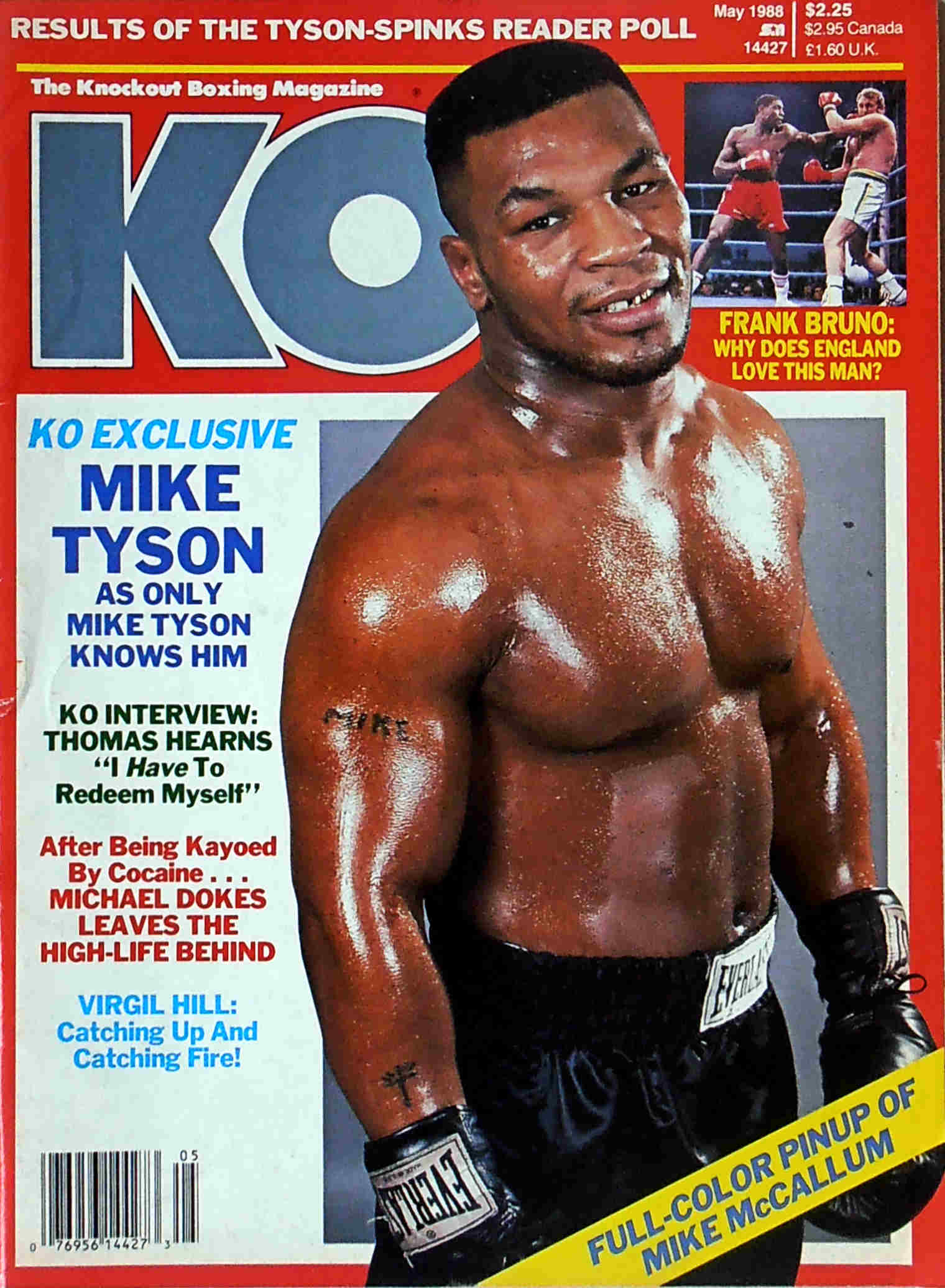
KO Magazine cover featuring Mike Tyson photographed by Bill Apter, May 1988

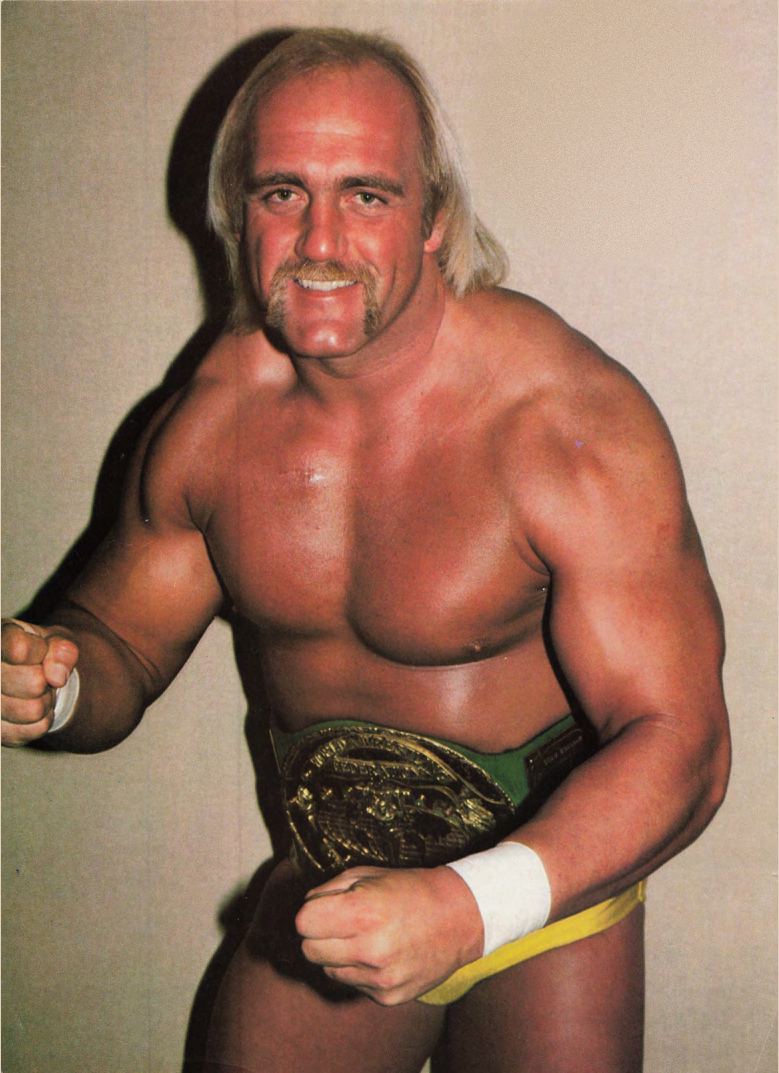
Hulk Hogan, 1985

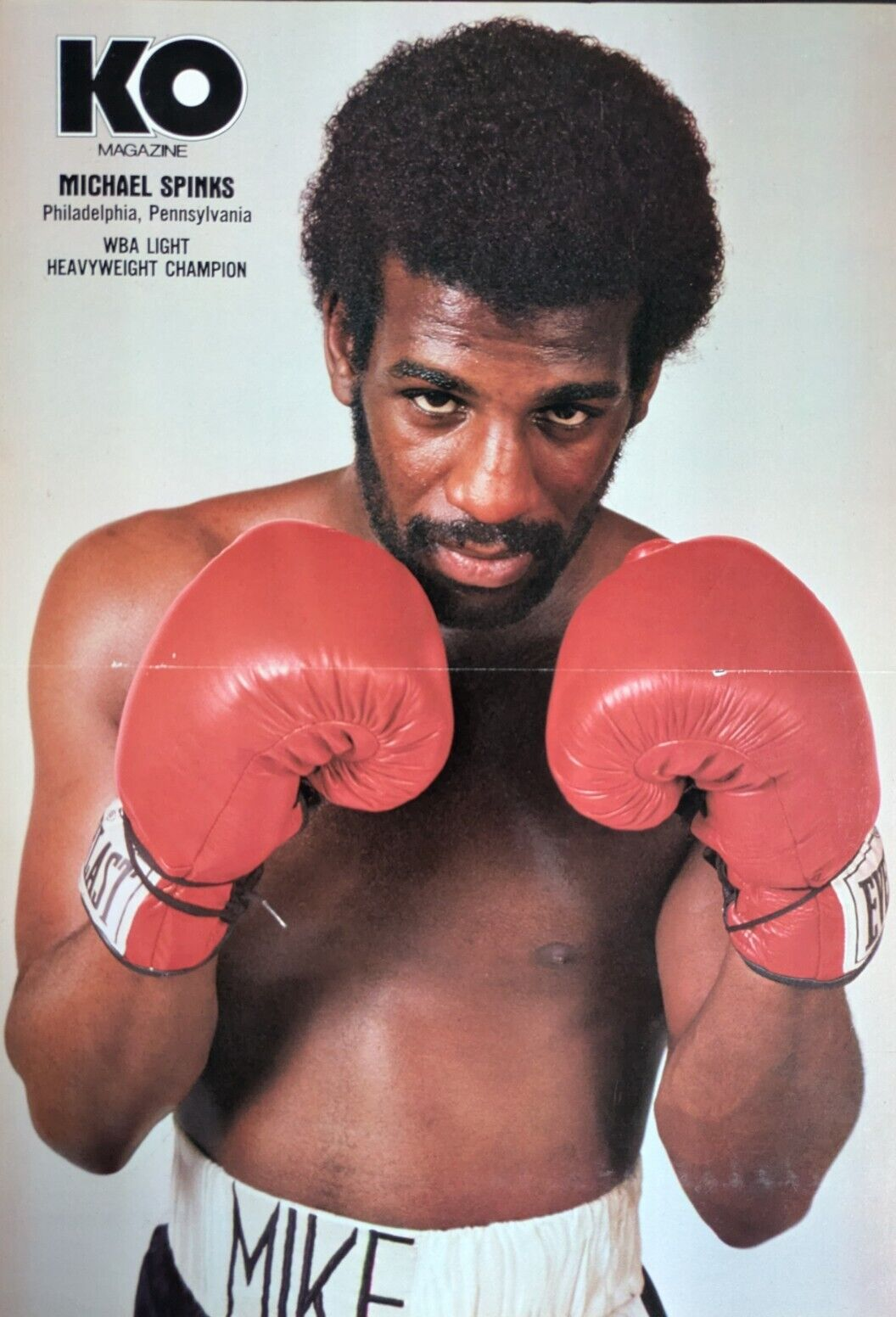
Michael Spinks, 1982

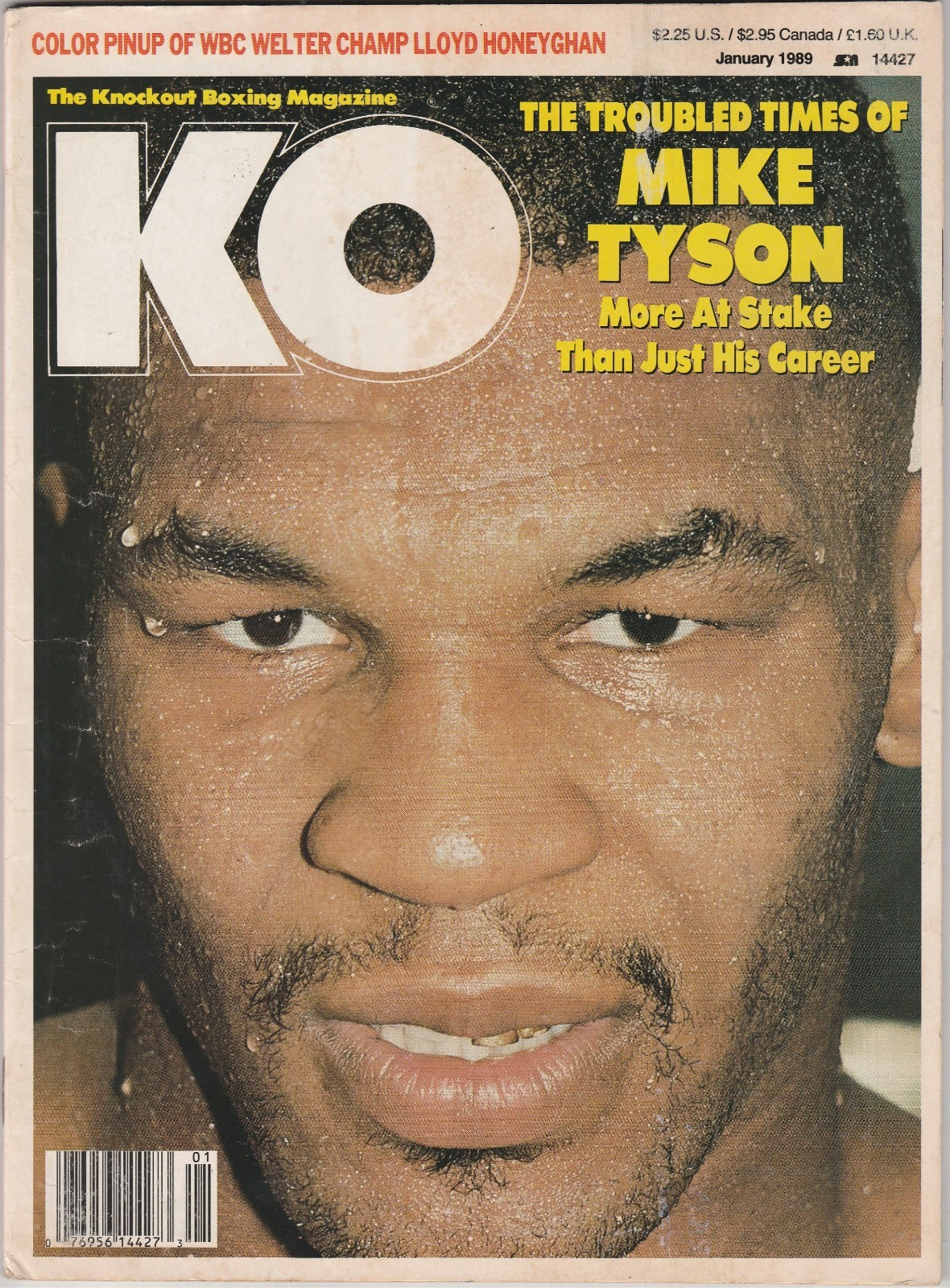
KO Magazine cover featuring Mike Tyson, photographed by Bill Apter, January 1989

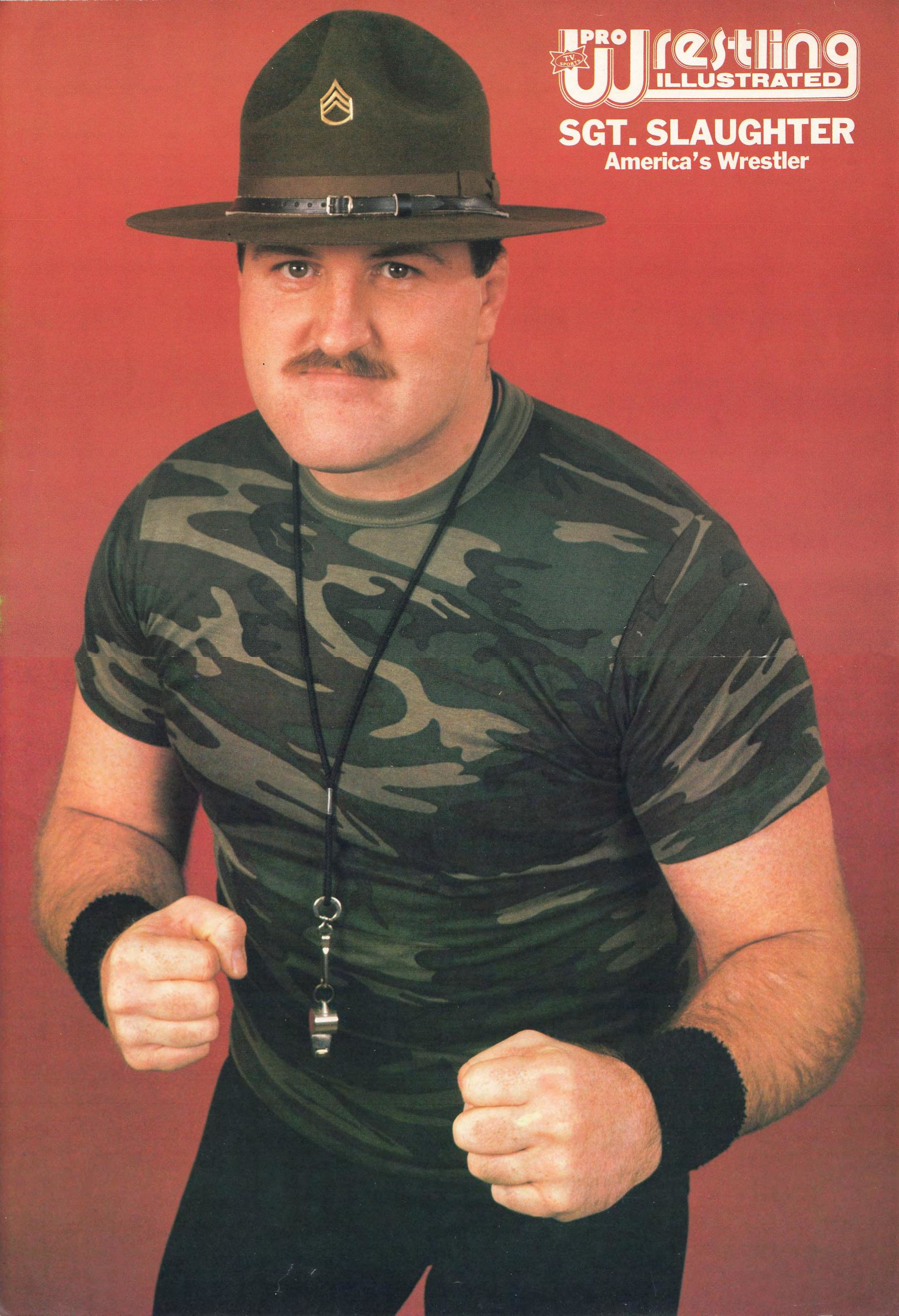
Sgt. Slaughter, 1985

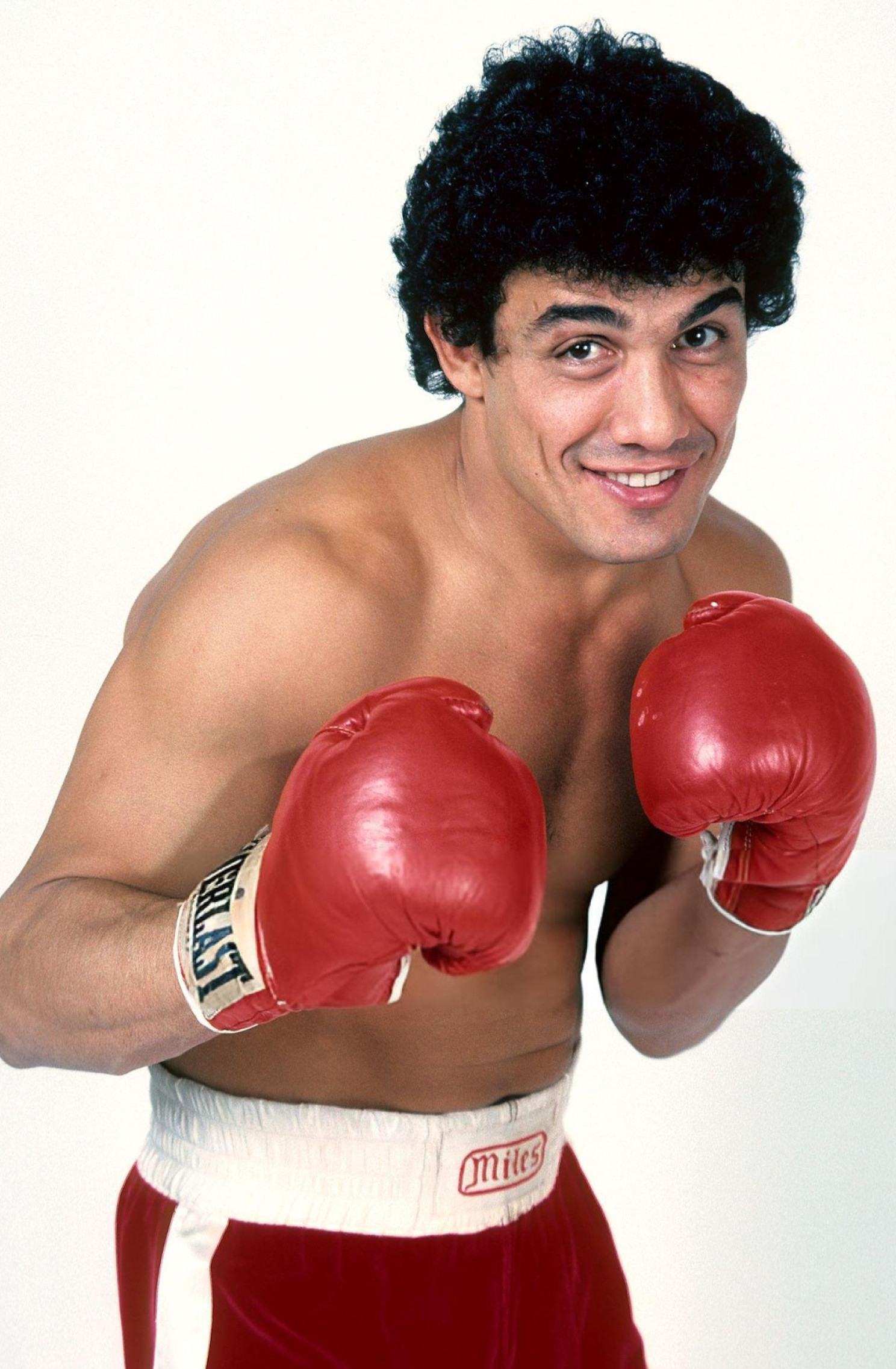
Mustafa Hamsho, 1981

== Personal life and outside interests ==
Apter was raised in Queens, New York. He resides in a suburb of Philadelphia with his wife, Andrea. They have been married since 1982 and have two children. Alongside former wrestler "Concrete Cowboy" Paul Swanger (aka "Paul Big Bear"), Apter sings and does comedic work in an "old school" nightclub act. Since February 2022, Apter has been working as an Employment Specialist for Access Services/Altec where he assists persons with disabilities to find successful community integrated employment. Apter is a regular face as a host of international pro wrestling fan conventions in the United States of America, the United Kingdom, and Germany including WrestleReunion.

== Awards and accomplishments ==
- Cauliflower Alley Club
  - Art Abrams Lifetime Achievement Award (2026)
- George Tragos/Lou Thesz Professional Wrestling Hall of Fame
  - James C. Melby Award (2012)
- International Professional Wrestling Hall of Fame
  - Class of 2024 (Excelsior award)
- National Wrestling Alliance
  - NWA Hall of Fame (2011)
- Nebraska Pro Wrestling Hall of Fame
  - Class of 2022
- New England Pro Wrestling Hall of Fame
  - Class of 2019
- St. Louis Wrestling Hall of Fame
  - Class of 2015
- Pittsburgh Pro Wrestling Hall of Fame
  - Class of 2017
- Pro Wrestling Illustrated
  - Stanley Weston Award (2022)
- Wrestling Observer Newsletter
  - Wrestling Observer Newsletter Hall of Fame (Class of 2018)
