= Wrestling Observer Newsletter =

Professional wrestling magazine

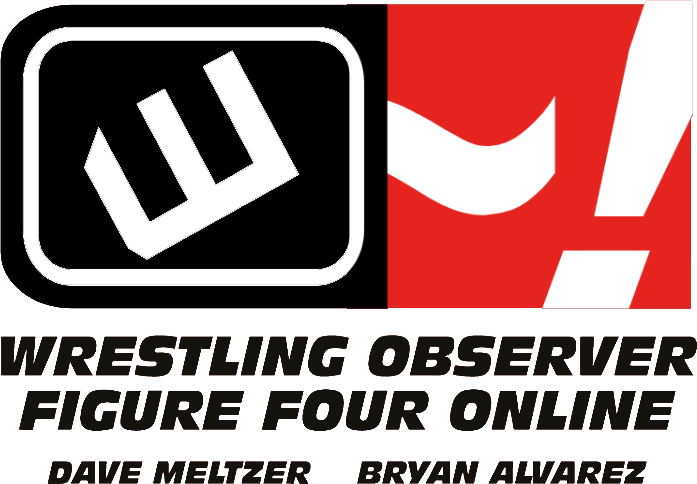
- Editor: Dave Meltzer; Bryan Alvarez
- Categories: Professional wrestling
- Founded: 1982
- Country: United States
- Language: English
- Website: f4wonline.com

The Wrestling Observer Newsletter (WON) is a newsletter that covers professional wrestling and mixed martial arts.

Founded in print in 1982 by Dave Meltzer, the Wrestling Observer website merged with Bryan Alvarez's Figure Four Weekly website in 2008, becoming Wrestling Observer Figure Four Online. The newsletter is often considered the first "dirt sheet", which is a wrestling publication covering the art from a real-life perspective.

== History ==
The beginnings of the Wrestling Observer Newsletter date back to 1980, when Meltzer began an annual poll amongst those with whom he corresponded regarding professional wrestling. According to Meltzer, he was just a fan at first. A short time later, he began maintaining a tape-trading list, and would occasionally send match results and news updates along with tape updates. Meltzer stated that he wanted to keep his friends in college "in the loop" for his tape trading as well as the happenings in the business, as the mainstream wrestling magazines catered to a somewhat younger demographic.

This led directly to the formation of the WON, which Meltzer first began publishing in 1982 as a way to keep fans informed of various wrestling regions that readers may not have been aware of or had no access to. The WON has been published from the start from various communities in Northern California, except for a six-month period in late 1983 and early 1984 when Meltzer resided in Wichita Falls, Texas. For most of its existence, it has been published from Campbell, California, a suburb of San Jose. The publication was originally a 16- to 24-page publication on 8½-by-14-inch paper, and published roughly every two or three weeks.

Meltzer contemplated a career change during the mid-1980s. He was to be hired to cover soccer instead and just contribute to other wrestling newsletters. In 1985, he announced that he would be ceasing publication, citing disinterest in the wrestling landscape of the time and too much time having to be spent on bookkeeping and mailing lists. At that point, he continued offering the WON on a "temporary" basis as an 8-page weekly on 8½-by-11-inch paper only to fill out the remainder of his subscriptions. Reader response convinced him to pursue the WON as his career instead. He started writing the WON full-time in 1987, retaining the smaller 8-page format. By this point, Meltzer began making appearances at major wrestling events, at first mostly in Japan. He was seen as a spectator in the front row at Chi-Town Rumble in 1989, seated next to Brad Muster, at the time a fullback with the Chicago Bears.

The WON's earlier years were also marked by revealing insider news and various behind-the-scenes happenings in the industry, a groundbreaking approach in a kayfabe-heavy era. Meltzer's approach benefitted from professional contacts, a historic perspective, and his own analysis of trends, data, and events. The WWE's 1997 "Montreal Screwjob" was exhaustively covered by the WON, including backstage events, including from Bret Hart himself. Meltzer published data-based evidence suggesting inflated record attendance figures for WrestleManias III and 23. He gave extensive space to various wrestling scandals, including Vince McMahon's 1990s steroid trial, the Chris Benoit murder investigation, and the high drug-fueled death rate within the wrestling ranks. His newsletter was also known for its lengthy obituaries of deceased wrestling figures, as well as a desire to chronicle the deaths of every wrestling figure possible, no matter how minor.

Meltzer stated that this new, more journalistic approach to covering wrestling earned him scorn from many within the wrestling business. However, Terry Funk and Bill Watts were early supporters of the WON from within the business. When readers first began hotly debating whether wrestling promoters actually read the publication or not, Meltzer published a letter to the editor from Watts, at the time still promoting. He also credited Houston promoter Paul Boesch for taking him under his wing in the 1980s and teaching him how the business works. As the business evolved along with the newsletter, Meltzer gained a little more acceptance.

Since major wrestling promotions would never acknowledge the existence of any "dirt sheets", Meltzer had to find other ways to advertise his newsletter. Advertisements and other promotion were often published in kayfabe and semi-kayfabe publications. Early sources for knowledge of the WON's existence were The Wrestling News published by Norman Kietzer, as well as Factsheet Five. The latter was decidedly a non-wrestling publication, though the WON and other wrestling sheets made up a significant amount of its coverage. Other magazines such as Wrestling Main Event and Wrestling Eye also provided mention. Meltzer was also able to advertise his publication during various guest appearances on wrestling radio shows and guest editorials in various national newspapers.

With the ubiquitous emergence of the Internet and wrestling web sites that are able to provide news in real time, today's WON differs in the way it covers the wrestling scene in that it provides more of an editorial and analysis on the news and what impacts it could have on the business. Wrestlers such as Konnan have noted seeing copies of the WON on Vince McMahon's office desk. It is believed many, if not most, of the biggest stars in WWE and other major promotions are subscribers, although few would admit it publicly. Several subscribed under their birth names, instead of ring names, thinking Meltzer would not find out their true identities. Howard Finkel's wife was publicly acknowledged by Meltzer as an early WON subscriber, and at the time, the closest reach the publication likely had to McMahon, which was in response to a reader questioning the likelihood of McMahon himself reading the publication.

=== Influence and legacy ===
Though he is not a wrestler or part of a promotion, Meltzer has occasionally been referenced within the professional wrestling ring. In the short-lived Universal Wrestling Federation (UWF) promotion, a jobber wrestled under the ring name Dave "The Observer" Meltzer. In 2014, The Young Bucks introduced a finishing move, combining a springboard 450 splash with a spike piledriver, dubbing it the "Meltzer Driver". In 2016, The Addiction introduced a finishing move, combining a double jump moonsault with a spike piledriver, dubbing it the "Best Meltzer Ever". Also, Ricochet and Matt Sydal introduced a finishing move combining a shooting star press with a spike piledriver dubbing it the "Shooting Star Meltzer Driver".

Meltzer's newsletter has led to a loyal fan following and radio shows. After getting a job with The National Sports Daily in 1990, Meltzer was finally able to open dialogue with Vince McMahon, leading to elevation in both Meltzer's reputation and readership. In his first autobiography, Mick Foley declared that it was the WON's coverage of his independent circuit matches that caused World Championship Wrestling (WCW) to consider signing him, since he was against "type". Foley also wrote that promoters such as Watts would sometimes change their entire booking direction based on the opinions expressed in Meltzer's newsletter.

In May 2015, Meltzer reported that Destination America had decided to cancel Impact Wrestling by late September 2015. Total Nonstop Action Wrestling (TNA) vehemently denied the reports, claiming that they "constitute[d] defamation" and that they were "seek[ing] all legal remedies available", but TNA was off Destination America by January 2016 and no legal matters ever arose.

== WON Hall of Fame ==
Like other wrestling halls of fame, such as the WWE, WCW, TNA, and NWA halls of fame, the Wrestling Observer Newsletter Hall of Fame is not a physical place. Nonetheless, it is a respected honor in the world of wrestling. Every year, Meltzer conducts a poll of selected "insiders" and wrestlers to determine new inductees into the WON Hall of Fame. Pro Wrestling Illustrated has adopted the WON Hall of Fame as their own.

== Wrestling Observer Live ==
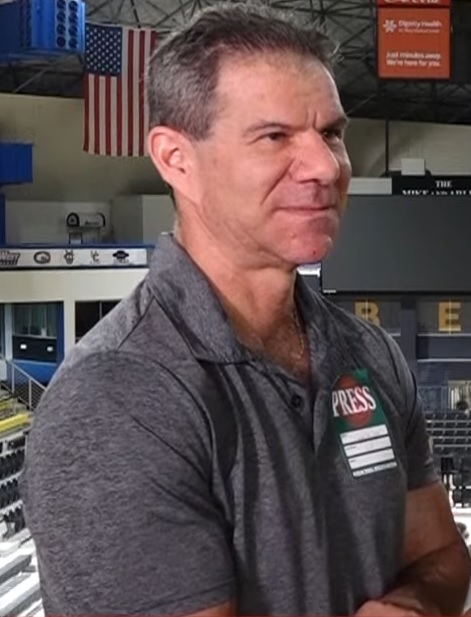
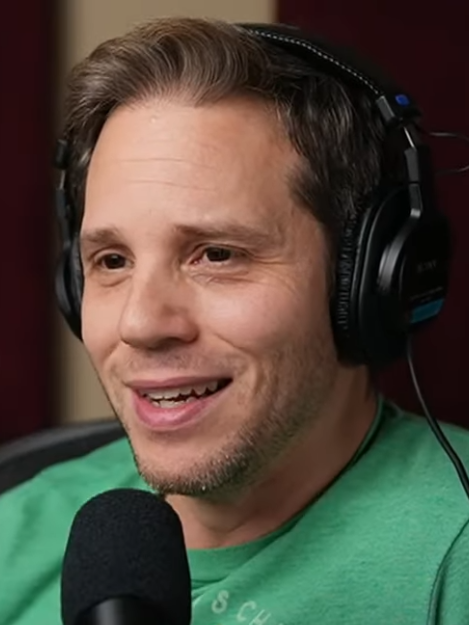
Hosts Dave Meltzer and Bryan Alvarez

Meltzer was the former host of Wrestling Observer Live, a wrestling radio show. Co-hosting the show with Meltzer was Bryan Alvarez, editor of the Figure Four Weekly newsletter. The show debuted in October 1999 and aired five days a week on the internet radio channel, eYada.com. eYada ceased operation on July 9, 2001, with Wrestling Observer Live, its highest-rated show, being the last show to broadcast on the station. On March 17, 2002, Wrestling Observer Live was picked up by Sports Byline USA, a radio syndicator based out of San Francisco, California, and has stayed broadcasting through Sports Byline ever since. Meltzer and Alvarez hosted the show every Sunday night from 8:00 to 10:00 p.m. EST on the Sports Byline Radio Network. Meltzer stopped appearing regularly in September 2007, but still appears periodically. On Sunday nights, Meltzer regularly appeared in a segment on the radio show Live Audio Wrestling prior to the show's cancellation.

Currently the Wrestling Observer Live is hosted by Bryan Alvarez Monday – Friday 3pm ET and Sundays by Andrew Zarian from 6pm ET – 7pm ET.

== Online transition ==
On June 12, 2008, the Wrestling Observer website merged with Bryan Alvarez's Figure Four Weekly website to become Wrestling Observer Figure Four Online, using the layout of Alvarez's former website. After being a print-only newsletter for over 25 years (other than a brief period where it was also available via e-mail in 2000), the Observer became available to subscribers online through the website.

== See also ==
- List of Wrestling Observer Newsletter awards
- Wrestling Observer Newsletter Hall of Fame
- Super Luchas
