= Wade Keller =

American wrestling journalist (born 1971)

- Born: May 22, 1971 (age 55); Bloomington, Minnesota, U.S.
- Occupation: Professional wrestling journalist
- Children: 1
- Writing career
- Period: 1987–present
- Subjects: Professional wrestling Mixed martial arts
- Notable work: The Pro Wrestling Torch

Wade Keller (born May 22, 1971) is an American professional wrestling journalist who runs the Pro Wrestling Torch newsletter. Keller has hosted The Wade Keller Pro Wrestling Podcast on PodcastOne since 2017.

== Pro Wrestling Torch ==
Keller founded Pro Wrestling Torch Newsletter (aka PWTorch, or simply The Torch) in October 1987, when he was a junior in high school. The newsletter is published weekly from his Minnesota home, with the content also published to an accompanying website which was launched in 1999. Keller's work includes weekly columns, news reporting and analysis, as well as interviews in both print and audio format. He works closely with wrestlers, promoters and wrestling fans to gather the information for his features. The Pro Wrestling Torch Livecast was broadcast via BlogTalkRadio until 2017.

One of the first Keller's yearly features is the Torch Talk, in which he conducts interviews with wrestlers. Keller is also the host of Pro Wrestling's Ultimate Insiders, a series of interviews with prominent wrestling personalities that are released on DVD. The first edition featured Vince Russo and Ed Ferrara, former writers for WWE and WCW, while the second edition was conducted with Jeff and Matt Hardy. Another was conducted with ECW and XPW wrestler New Jack.

== MMA Torch ==
Wade Keller also created and oversees MMA Torch, a website devoted to the world of mixed martial arts (MMA). The site has been around since the early 2000s and was one of the first sites to ever devote coverage to the world of MMA. He has interviewed Dana White, original UFC matchmaker Art Davie and UFC announcer Mike Goldberg. Before the MMA Torch website was launched, Keller's MMA coverage was included in the pages of the Pro Wrestling Torch Newsletter, including coverage of the first UFC pay-per-view. The site provides news, interviews, analysis and opinions as well as a message board feature.

== Personal life ==
Keller is gay. He and longtime partner Cory have a son named Bowie. Keller is also a lifelong practitioner of martial arts.

== Awards and accomplishments ==
- George Tragos/Lou Thesz International Wrestling Institute
  - Jim Melby Award (2015)

== See also ==
- List of professional wrestling websites
