= List of professional wrestling magazines =

This is a list of professional wrestling magazines. They are published either in print or online and range from official magazines of professional wrestling promotions to "dirt sheets", which cover more insider information and sometimes rumors. Some of the more notable magazines include Pro Wrestling Illustrated, Fighting Spirit Magazine, Wrestling Observer Newsletter, Super Luchas, Power Slam, WWE Magazine, Pro Wrestling Torch, Inside The Ropes Magazine, and The Bagpipe Report.

== List ==
=== Print magazines ===
Title	Years active	Print Time	Location	Founder/ Editor(s)	Publishers	Circulation	Website	Notes
Arena De Lucha Libre		Monthly	Mexico			N/A	No	
The Atomic Elbow	2012-	Quarterly (2012-2019) Irregularly published (2020- )	(United States) Athens, GA	Robert Newsome	N/A	500	Yes	Professional wrestling fanzine featuring reviews, interviews, and analysis.
Ben Strong Wrestling	1973 – 1975	Monthly	(United States) Rockville Centre, NY	Stanley Weston; Bill Apter (ed)	G.C. London Publishing	N/A	No	Past of the "Ben Strong Series".
Big Book of Wrestling	1968 - 1978	Monthly	(United States) Scottsdale, AZ	Roger Elwood (ed)	Jalart House	N/A	No	
Box y Lucha	1954–present		Mexico			N/A	Yes	Oldest Mexican wrestling magazine still in print
Boxing Illustrated Wrestling News	1958 - 1967	Monthly	(United States) New York City	Stanley Weston	Champion Sports Publishing	N/A	No	Became Boxing Illustrated in 1967.
Boxing & Wrestling Magazine	1952 - 1964	Monthly	United States	Stanley Weston; Eddie Borden	Boxing and Wrestling Inc.	N/A	No	
Celebrity Wrestling	1987 - 1989	Monthly	United States	Michael O'Hara	Mand O. Communications Inc.	N/A	No	
Championship Wrestling	1984 - 1990	Monthly	United States		Modern Day Periodicals Inc.	N/A	No	
Complete Wrestling Roundup	1974 - 1975	Monthly	United States		Jalbert House Inc.	No	No	
Double-Action Wrestling	1986 - 1988	Monthly	United States	Michael O'Hara	M. And O. Communications Inc.	N/A	No	
Fighting Spirit Magazine	2006 - 2019	Monthly	United Kingdom	Brian Elliott	Uncooked Media	N/A	Yes	Contributors include Steve Austin, Jim Cornette, Lance Storm and Nick Aldis.
Gold Belt Wrestling	1987 - 1991	Monthly	United States		Michael O'Hara	Gold Belt Wrestling, Inc.	No	
Illustrated Wrestling Digest	1970s	Monthly	United States	Rob Dobratz		N/A	No	Regarded as the top "dirt sheet" in the US after the close of Matmania in 1968.
Inside The Ropes Magazine	2020–present	Monthly	United Kingdom	Dante Richardson Kenny McIntosh	Titan Insider Press	N/A	Yes	The successor to "Power Slam"
Inside Wrestling	1968 - 2013	Monthly	(United States) Ambler, PA	Stanley Weston; Bill Apter (ed.)	Kappa Publishing Group	N/A	Yes	Combined with The Wrestler in 2004.
Main Event Wrestling	c. 1983 – 1993	Monthly	United States			N/A	No	
Major League Wrestling	c. 1978 – 1984	Monthly	United States	Norm Kietzer		N/A	No	
Matmania	1964 - 1968	Monthly	(United States) Minneapolis, MN	Burt Ray		N/A	No	Publication is considered the earliest-known "dirt sheet". Continued by James C. Melby after Ray's retirement in 1968.
New Wave Wrestling	1992 - 2004	Monthly	(United States) New York City, NY	Mike O'Hara	Combat Sports Magazine Group	N/A	Yes	
Official International Wrestling Insider	1987 - 1991	Monthly	United States		Wrestling Insider Inc.	N/A	No	
Official Wrestling	1951 - c. 1975	Monthly	United States		Official Wrestling Inc.	N/A	No	
Official Wrestling Guide	1970s	Monthly	United States		Jalart House	N/A	No	
Piledriver Magazine	1989 - 2000	Monthly	Australia			N/A	No	
Popular Wrestling	1970s	Monthly	United States		Popular Publishing	N/A	No	
Power Slam	1994–2014	Monthly	(United Kingdom) Maidstone, KEN	Findlay Martin; Colin Bowman	SW Publishing	N/A	Yes	Longest-running professional wrestling magazine in the United Kingdom. Succeeded Superstars of Wrestling. Succeeded by Inside The Ropes Magazine.
Power of Wrestling	2001 - 2002	Monthly	United Kingdom		Highbury Publishing House	N/A	No	
Power-Wrestling	1995–present	Monthly	Germany	Wolfgang Stach	PV Verlags GmbH, Düsseldorf	N/A	Yes	Longest-running professional wrestling magazine in Germany.
Pro Wrestling Body Press Magazine	1970s	Monthly	United States			N/A	No	
Pro Wrestling Illustrated	1979–present	Monthly	(United States) Blue Bell, PA	Stanley Weston; Bill Apter (ed.)	Kappa Publishing Group	N/A	Yes	
Rumble Magazine	2011–present	Monthly	Australia		Rumble Magazine	N/A	Yes	
The Ring Wrestling	1963 - 1984	Monthly	United States		The Ring Inc.	N/A	No	Merged with other Kietzer publications into The Wrestling News in 1972.
Ringside Wrestling	1984 - 2000	Monthly	United States	Norman Jacobs	Starlog Publishing	N/A	No	
Ring Sirens Magazine	2013–present	Monthly	Canada	Tyler Prattis		N/A	Yes	Women's Wrestling Magazine
Sports Review Wrestling	1972 - 1995	Monthly	United States	Stanley Weston	London Publishing Company	N/A	No	Published the popular "Apartment Wrestling" columns from 1973 to 1983.
Super Luchas	1991–present	Weekly	Mexico	Ernesto Ocampo		15,000	Yes	
Superstar Wrestlers	1987 - 1994	Monthly	United States	Norman Jacobs	Starlog Publishing	N/A	No	
Superstar Wrestlers Reporter	1988 - 1989	Monthly	United States		Comics World Corporation	N/A	No	
Superstars of Wrestling	1991–1994	Monthly	(United Kingdom) Maidstone, KEN	Findlay Martin; Colin Bowman	SW Publishing	N/A	No	Succeeded by Power Slam.
The Tag Rope	2014–present	Quarterly	United Kingdom	Ryan Carse		N/A	Yes	
Total Wrestling	2002 – 2004	Monthly	United Kingdom	Total Wrestling Magazine	Highbury Publishing House	25,000 (2003)	Yes	Continuation of Power of Wrestling. Bill Apter served as senior editor.
Tutto Wrestling Magazine			Italy			N/A	Yes	Largest Italian language wrestling magazine.
Victory Sports Wrestling	c. 1972 – 1989	Monthly	United States			N/A	No	
WOW Magazine (Women of Wrestling)	1988 –	Monthly	United States			N/A	No	
WOW Magazine (World of Wrestling)	1999 – 2001	Monthly	United States	H&S Media	Mike Morris	N/A	No	The first magazine marketed towards "smart" fans, Bill Apter served as its editor-in-chief during its 3-year run.
Wrestle America	c. 1992 - 1999	Monthly	United States			N/A	No	
The Wrestler	October 1966 - 2013	Monthly	(United States) Ambler, PA	Stanley Weston	London Publishing Company	N/A	Yes	Combined with Inside Wrestling in 2004.
Wrestling	1951	Monthly	(United States) Jersey City, NJ	Joseph Weider	Wrestling Inc.	N/A	No	
Wrestling	c. 1984 - 1992	Monthly	United States			N/A	No	
Wrestling '83	1983 - 1992	Quarterly	United States				No	Subsequently published "Wrestling '84", "Wrestling '85", "Wrestling '86", etc. One-time special was published in 1999.
Wrestling '93: Rulebreaker	1993 - 1994	Quarterly	United States	Stanley Weston; Eddie Ellner (credited as "Editorial Conscience")	London Publishing Company	No	N/A	Heel viewpoint magazine. Succeeded "Wrestling '83" last issue in 1992 and was succeeded by Wrestling Bad Guys.
Wrestling Action	1977 - 1979	Monthly	United States	World Wide Wrestling Federation	Vince McMahon, Sr.	N/A	No	Notable staff members included editor-in-chief Les Thatcher and photographer George Napolitano.
Wrestling Action	1987	Monthly	United States			Harris Publishing	No	
Wrestling All Stars Heroes and Villains	1983 - 2000	Monthly	United States	Norman Jacobs		N/A	No	Originally published as simply Wrestling All Stars from 1983 to 1985.
Wrestling As You Like It	1946 - 1955	Monthly	(United States) Chicago, IL	Dick Axman		N/A	No	Earliest wrestling publication ever published and the only one active during the post-WWII years. Replaced by Wrestling Life in 1955.
Wrestling Bad Guys	1990s	Monthly	United States	Stanley Weston; Eddie Ellner 1994-1996, Brandi Manciewicz 1996-end (both credited as "Editorial Conscience")	G.C. London Publishing Company	N/A	No	Heel viewpoint magazine
Wrestling Confidential	1964 - c. 1965	Monthly	United States		Complete Sports Publishers	N/A	No	
Wrestling Confidential	1987–present	Monthly	United States		DOJO Publishing	N/A	No	
Wrestling Eye	1980s	Monthly	United States		Jems, Inc.	N/A	No	
Wrestling Fever	1980s	Monthly	United States		M. Morse Publishing	N/A	No	
Wrestling Fury	1987 - 1992	Monthly	United States		Jems Inc.	N/A	No	
Wrestling Greatest Battles	1970s	Monthly	United States		G.C. London Publishing Company	N/A	No	
Wrestling Guide	1970s	Monthly	United States			N/A	No	
Wrestling Illustrated		Monthly	United States			N/A	No	
Wrestling Life	1955 - 1964	Monthly	United States	Dick Axman		N/A	No	
Wrestling's Main Event	1982 - c. 1994	Monthly	United States	George Napolitano	Pumpkin Press	N/A	No	
Wrestling Monthly	1971 - c. 1977	Monthly	United States	Norm Kietzer	Kietzer Publishing	N/A	No	Merged with other Kietzer publications into The Wrestling News.
Wrestling News	1959–present	Monthly	(United States) Fraser, MI	Norm Kietzer	Kietzer Publishing	N/A	Yes	Purchased by Arena Publishing in 2002 and published as "Wrestling Revue".
Wrestling Picture Book	c. 1975 - 1979	Monthly	United States			N/A	No	
Wrestling Power	1986-1989	Monthly	United States	Norman Jacobs		N/A	No	
Wrestling Revue	1959 - 1983	Monthly	United States	Stanley Weston	Publications Quebecor	N/A	No	
Wrestling Ringside	1984 - 1992	Monthly	United States			N/A	No	
Wrestling Scene	c. 1982 - 1988	Monthly	United States	Norman Jacobs	Starlog Press	N/A	No	
Wrestling Sports Stars	c. 1972 - 1975	Monthly	United States			N/A	No	
Wrestling Superstars	c. 1978 - 1997	Monthly	United States			N/A	No	
Wrestling Today	1978 - c. 1993	Monthly	United States		Ideal Publishing	N/A	No	
Wrestling Training Illustrated	1973-1985	Monthly	United States	Scott Epstein; Dan Lurie	Muscle-Man Inc.	N/A	No	
Too Sweet Magazine	2016 -	Quarterly	India	Mohammad Faizan	Shooting Star Press	N/A	Yes	First ever pro wrestling magazine from India. Earlier known as The Squared Circle Magazine. Head writers: Nick Whitworth, Santos Esquivel Jr. & Tom Yamamoto.
Wrestling and TV Sports	1951	Monthly	(United States) New York City		Fanfare Publications	N/A	No	
Wrestling USA	1954 - 1955	Monthly	(United States) Charleston, WV	Douglas Dalton	Dalton Publications	N/A	No	
Wrestling USA	c. 1984 - 1993	Quarterly	United States	Stanley Weston	G.C. London Publishing Company	N/A	No	
Wrestling Weekly	1998 - 2001	Weekly	Australia			N/A	No	
Wrestling World	1954 - 1955	Monthly	(United States) New York City, NY	Norman Jacobs		N/A	No	Continuation of the NWA's Official Wrestling magazine.
SEA Wrestling	2025	Bi-Monthly	Southeast Asia	Simon Richards		N/A	http://seawrestling.net	Southeast Asia's only pro wrestling magazine.
Wrestling World	1962 - 2001	Monthly	(United States) New York City, NY		Sterling/Mcfadden Partnership	N/A	No	Contributors included Stately Wayne Manor.

=== Official promotions ===
Title	Years active	Print Time	Location	Founder(s)	Publishers	Circulation	Website	Notes
AWA Magazine	c. 1972 – 1977	Monthly	(United States) Minneapolis		Championship Sports Publishing	N/A	No	Official American Wrestling Association magazine.
AWE Magazine	2006	Monthly	(Canada) Winnipeg	Jeff Dyck	Canadian Gold Media	N/A	No	Official Action Wrestling Entertainment magazine.
ECW Magazine	1999 – 2000	Bi-Monthly	(United States) Philadelphia	Mike Morris (ed.)	H&S Media	N/A	Yes	Official Extreme Championship Wrestling magazine.
GLOW Magazine	1988	Monthly	(United States) Las Vegas, Nevada	David McLane	Tempo Publishing	N/A	No	Official Gorgeous Ladies of Wrestling magazine.
N.W.A. Official Wrestling	1951 - 1953	Monthly	(United States) Washington, D.C.	Fred Kohler, Dick Axman (ed.)	N.W.A. Official Wrestling, Inc.	N/A	No	Official National Wrestling Alliance magazine.
WCW Magazine	1991 - 1994	Monthly	(United States) Atlanta	Bill Apter; Craig Peters; Dennis A. Brent	World Championship Wrestling	N/A	No	Originally known as NWA/WCW Wrestling Wrap-Up from 1989 to 1991.
WCW Magazine	1995 - 2001	Monthly	(United States) Atlanta	Colin Bowman; Ross Forman	World Championship Wrestling	N/A	No	Second volume which ran until WCW's close in 2001.
WWF/E Magazine	1983–2014	Monthly	(United States) Stamford, Connecticut	Bob Lee; Tony Romando (eic)	World Wrestling Entertainment, Inc.	N/A	Yes	Originally known as WWF Victory Magazine in 1983. In July 2014 the WWE announced it would cease production due to budget cuts and declining sales of the magazine.
Westside Pro Wrestling's Almanac	2010	Yearly	Australia			N/A	No	Official Westside Pro Wrestling magazine.
Wrestling News	1960	Monthly	Australia			N/A	No	Official World Championship Wrestling magazine.
XPW Magazine	1999	Monthly	(United States) Philadelphia			N/A	No	Official Xtreme Pro Wrestling magazine.

=== Online magazines and newsletters ===
Title	Years active	Print Time	Location	Founder(s)	Publishers	Circulation	Website	Notes
The Bagpipe Report	1996–2000	Monthly	United States	Charles MacLaurin; Blake Norton	N/A	40,000	Yes	One of the most read internet newsletters during the late-1990s, it was the first weekly pro wrestling magazine show broadcast via TWC Fight!. Purchased by Wrestling-Online.com in 2000.
The Chokeslam Newsletter	1998–2003	Daily	United States	John White	N/A	8,500	N/A	One of the few daily email newsletters. John White got his start as a contributor to The Bagpipe Report.
Connecticut Pro Wrestling	1993-1996	Monthly	(United States) Colchester, CT	N/A	N/A	N/A	No	
Figure Four Weekly	1995–	Weekly	(United States) Woodinville, WA	Bryan Alvarez	N/A	N/A	Yes	
Pro Wrestling Torch	1987–	Weekly	(United States) St. Paul, MN	Wade Keller	N/A	N/A	Yes	
Ring Around The Northwest	1983–2013	Monthly	(United States) Troutdale, OR	Mike Rodgers	N/A	N/A	No	
The Ring Fan	2011–	Daily	(United States) Wytheville, VA	Clarence Eddie Cowan	N/A	N/A	Yes	
The Squared Circle Magazines	2015–	Monthly	India	Md. Faizan	N/A	N/A	Yes	The first ever pro wrestling magazine in India.
Wrestling Observer	1983–	Weekly	(United States) Campbell, CA	Dave Meltzer	N/A	N/A	Yes	
Wrestling-Online Newsletter	1996–	Daily	Malta	Colin Vassallo	N/A	27,000	Yes	The newsletter is also available on iPad as a monthly magazine titled Wrestling-Online Digital Magazine, free for download on the iTunes Newsstand.
Smark Henry Wrestling News	2015–	Daily	Philippines	Anthony Cuello	N/A	N/A	Yes	
Wrestling World News	1996-1998	Weekly	Scotland	Jamie Smith		Approx. 60 subscribers	No	
