= Axman =

Axman is a surname. Notable people with the surname include:

- Dick Axman (1891–1969), American sports publicist, sportswriter, magazine creator and magazine editor
- Steve Axman (born 1947), American football coach

== See also ==
- AxMan, software developed by H. D. Moore
- Axmann
- Axeman
