= Champions of the Galaxy =

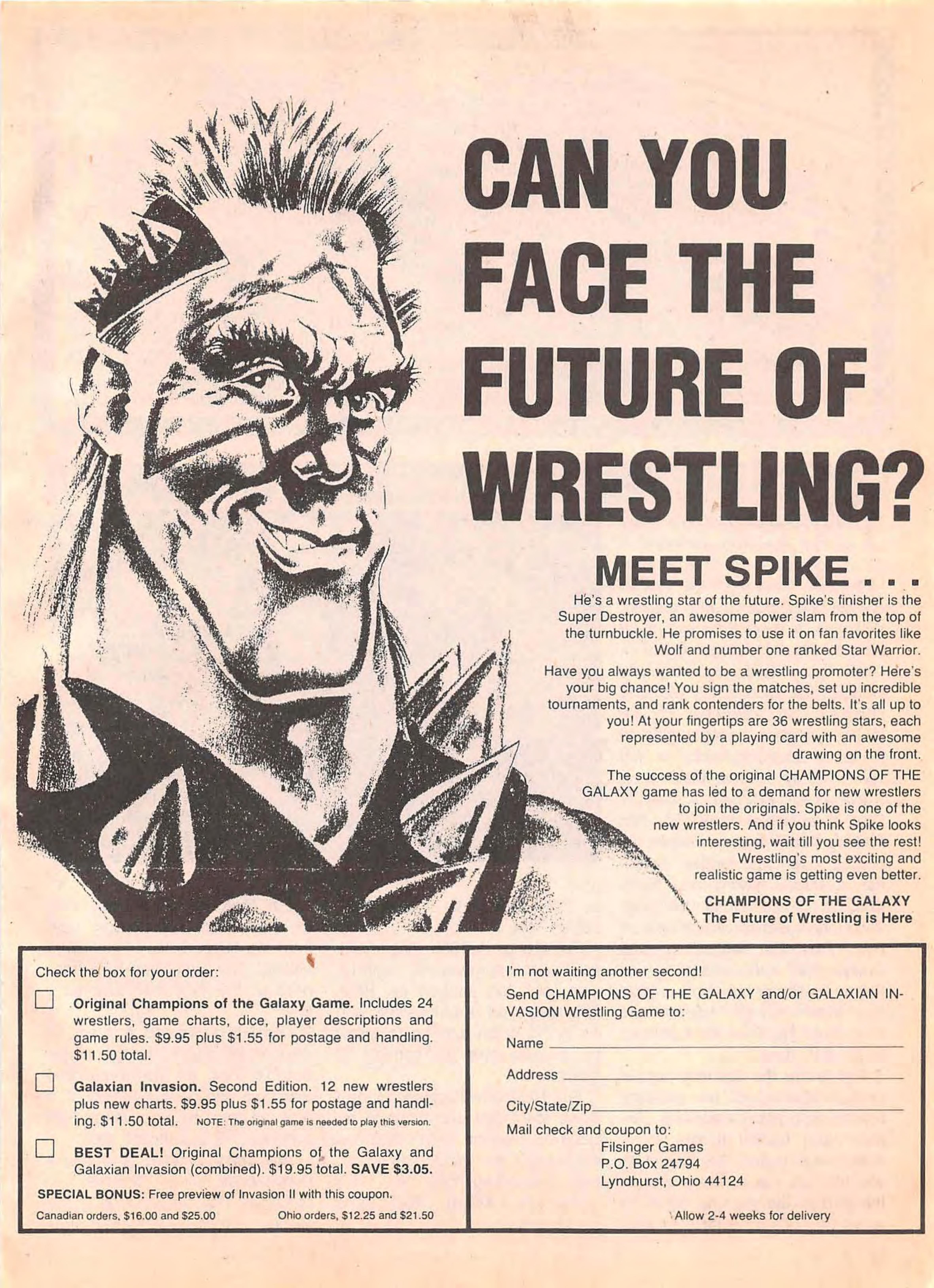
- Advertisement for the game in Pro Wrestling Illustrated
- Players: 1 and up
- Setup time: 10 minutes
- Playing time: Varies
- Chance: High
- Age range: 10 +
- Skills: Reading

Champions of the Galaxy is a collectible card game that incorporates dice, situation charts and over three-hundred wrestlers from a myriad of planets and galaxies in the future, created by Tom Filsinger, a community college psychology professor and entrepreneur from Jamestown, New York. The game was widely advertised in comic books and pro wrestling magazines from the late 1980s to early 2000s.

== Gameplay ==
Champions of the Galaxy is card, dice and charts game designed to emulate the action of professional wrestling. Each wrestler in the game is represented by a playing card with his/her picture on the front and game information including power, agility and three levels of offensive and defensive capability on the back. In addition, later editions feature a headshot of the wrestlers on the back of the cards, as well as height, weight and home for easy viewing.

Its focus is professional wrestling 100 years in the future. Players use cards representing the wrestlers (who may be human or alien), and roll dice to determine the wrestlers' moves. Players have the advantage of being surprised by the wrestlers' "choice" of maneuvers, while still getting to set feuds and play the role of a head promoter, or "fed head", of their own wrestling federation (or "fed"). The game can be played solitaire, or by as many players as can crowd around the table at one time (and, of course, as many as there are cards for). Game editions begin in the year 2087, and progress yearly from there; at this writing the present edition is 2123. Filsinger Games, the company that produces COTG, produces two editions per year. Individual fed heads create their own characters to use in the game, and often share them with other promoters. There are many websites, and also a mailing list and e-mail zines.

== History of the game ==
Created in the mid-70s by Cleveland high school student Tom Filsinger, the game was played only by him and his brother and featured several top wrestling stars of the mid-70s.

On July 11, 2014, a live pro wrestling event based on the card game was held at the Allen Park Ice Rink in Jamestown, New York. Fitting with the sci-fi theme, "Champions of the Galaxy" was headlined by a six-man tag team match pitting Chuck Taylor, Alex Reynolds and Orange Cassidy against "a species of alien fighters".

== GWF history ==
=== Pre-history (classics) ===
The history of the Galaxian Wrestling Federation from 2074 through 2086 has only been unveiled in pieces over time. Classics 2079 showed a snapshot of the GWF in which Omega and rival Morpheus fought for the top spot, Commander Sam was a young patriot battling the alien Mangus and archetypal hero and villain Star Warrior and Thantos (then Cosmos) were still friends and had yet to split apart in a bloody feud. The handbook for the game edition included the concept of Kronus, the Crossroad of Time, an excuse for those who follow the game's official storyline to have "dream matches" featuring wrestlers who never competed at the same time in the GWF.
