= George Napolitano =

American photographer

George Napolitano is an American photographer who specialized in professional wrestling photography for Stanley Weston's magazines, and former photography teacher in Charles O Dewey JHS in Sunset Park brooklyn. Napolitano has been noted as a leading wrestling photographer in the 1970s and 1980s, specifically being acknowledged by Dwayne Johnson.

== Awards ==
- International Professional Wrestling Hall of Fame
  - Class of 2026 (Excelsior Award)
- George Tragos/Lou Thesz Professional Wrestling Hall of Fame
  - Jim Melby Award (2013)
- Professional Wrestling Hall of Fame
  - Class of 2017
- Pro Wrestling Illustrated
  - Stanley Weston Award (2022)
