= Axe manufacturing in Pennsylvania =

Axes and other edge tools have been manufactured in central Pennsylvania since before 1825.

== Mann Family ==
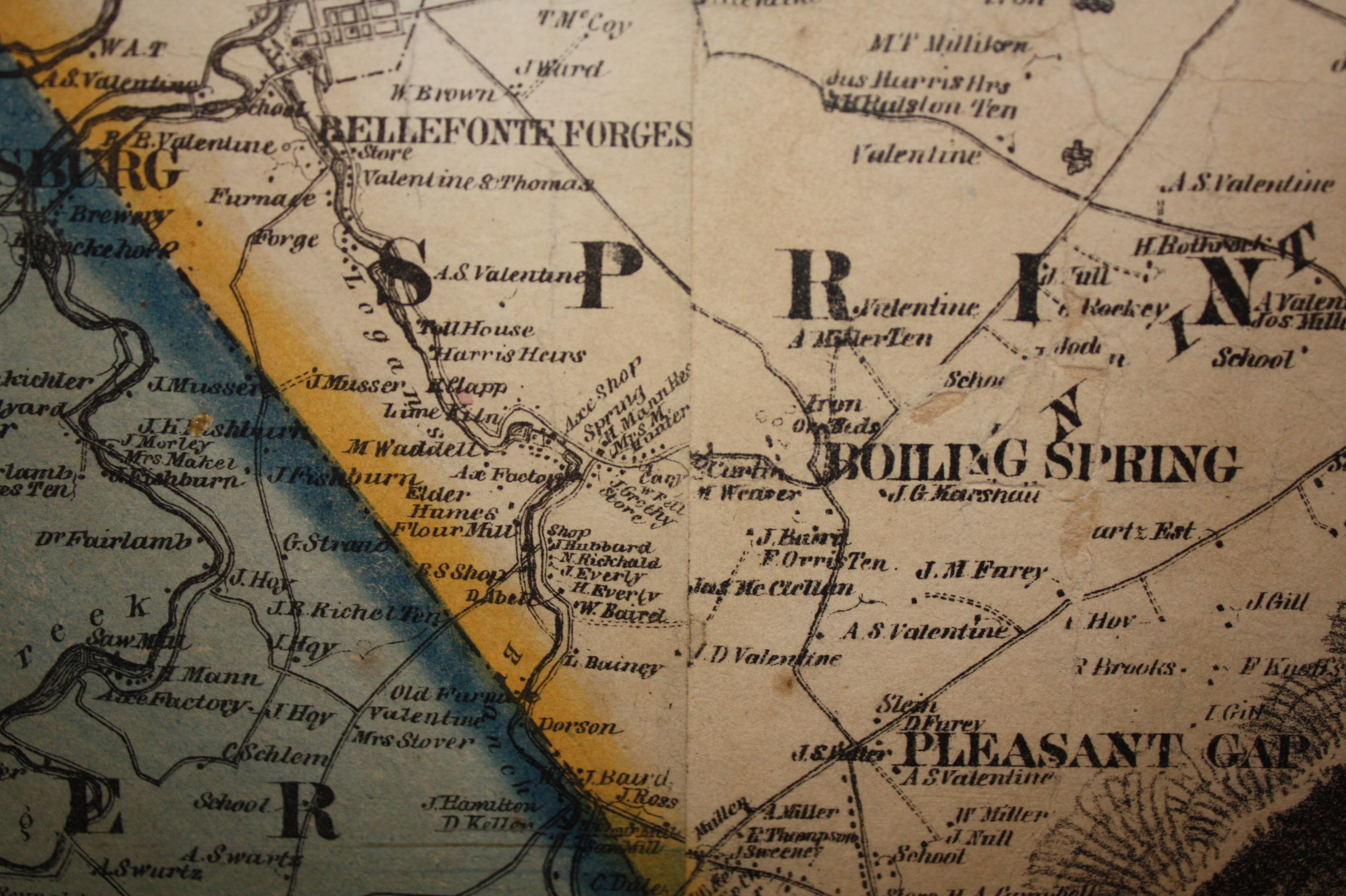
Mann Axe Factories at Boiling Spring & Paradise (1861 H.F. Walling map).

William Mann Jr. first arrived in Bellefonte in 1823, and together with his brother Harvey built an axe factory at Boiling Spring on Spring Creek's Logan Branch. For the next 100 years, members of the Mann family would establish and operate axe factories at four main locations in central Pennsylvania: Axemann-Bellefonte in Centre County (Spring Creek); Reedsville-Yeagertown and Lewistown in Mifflin County (Kishacoquillas Creek); and Mill Hall in Clinton County (Big Fishing Creek). Affiliated operations occurred at Paradise, Unionville, Tyrone, Mackeyville, and Flemington, PA. Throughout this lengthy period, the businesses endured despite personal illness, early deaths, family disputes, financial difficulties, labor unrest, and fire and flood disasters that often struck axe works.

=== Axemann & Bellefonte, PA (1825–1892) – Harvey Mann & Son ===
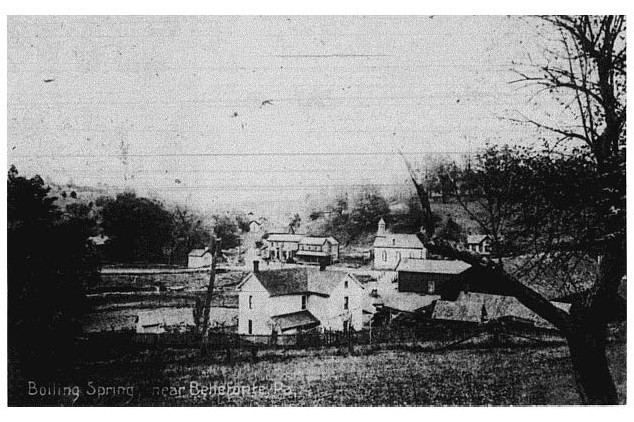
Boiling Spring, PA, postcard view (ca. 1910).

William Jr. and Harvey Mann started production of axes in 1825 in Bellefonte. They were only 23 and 21 years of age. Prior to this venture, they were living near Watertown, New York, where William Sr., their father, made edge tools. Three years later in 1828, they moved to Boiling Spring (now Axemann) and built a modern forge on land purchased from Judge Thomas Burnside. Two dams and mill ponds were constructed to provide water power for trip hammers. Axe production at the time was largely a calling of blacksmiths, and the factory was among the first to employ machinery.

Axe production in the 1800s was a laborious process, even with the aid of machines. Early axes were made from two pieces of metal. The poll or head of an axe was formed by folding a bar of heated wrought iron, which also creates an eye. High carbon steel was used for the bit or cutting edge. Two methods existed for attaching a bit to the iron scarf. An early "inlay" method inserted a bit into a V-shaped cleft or "lip" in the scarf, welded in a forge, and then drawn using a trip hammer. The overlay method – patented by Harvey Mann in 1862 (no. 35,480) – welded steel on the outside of the scarf, which exposed more steel on the cutting edge.

Around 1900, all-steel heads came into use. An online video from 1964 captures the effort required to make axes, including steeling the head and hanging ("hafting") a handle or haft.

Initially, output was limited to felling ("chopping") axes and soon grew to over 300 axe heads per day. The main building was 350 feet long and 70 feet wide. Production in 1855 was carried out by a workforce of fifty men. Wages were only $2.50 to $3 per day, but this was greater than the $1 wage received by local iron furnace workers.

An axe-finishing shop at Thomas Mill in Bellefonte was established in 1832 through partnership with Franklin B. Smith, but this venture failed after only a year. Its failure caused a split between the brothers, with Harvey assuming the debts. Later, a finishing plant was added near Paradise (now Fisherman's Paradise; lower left on map above).

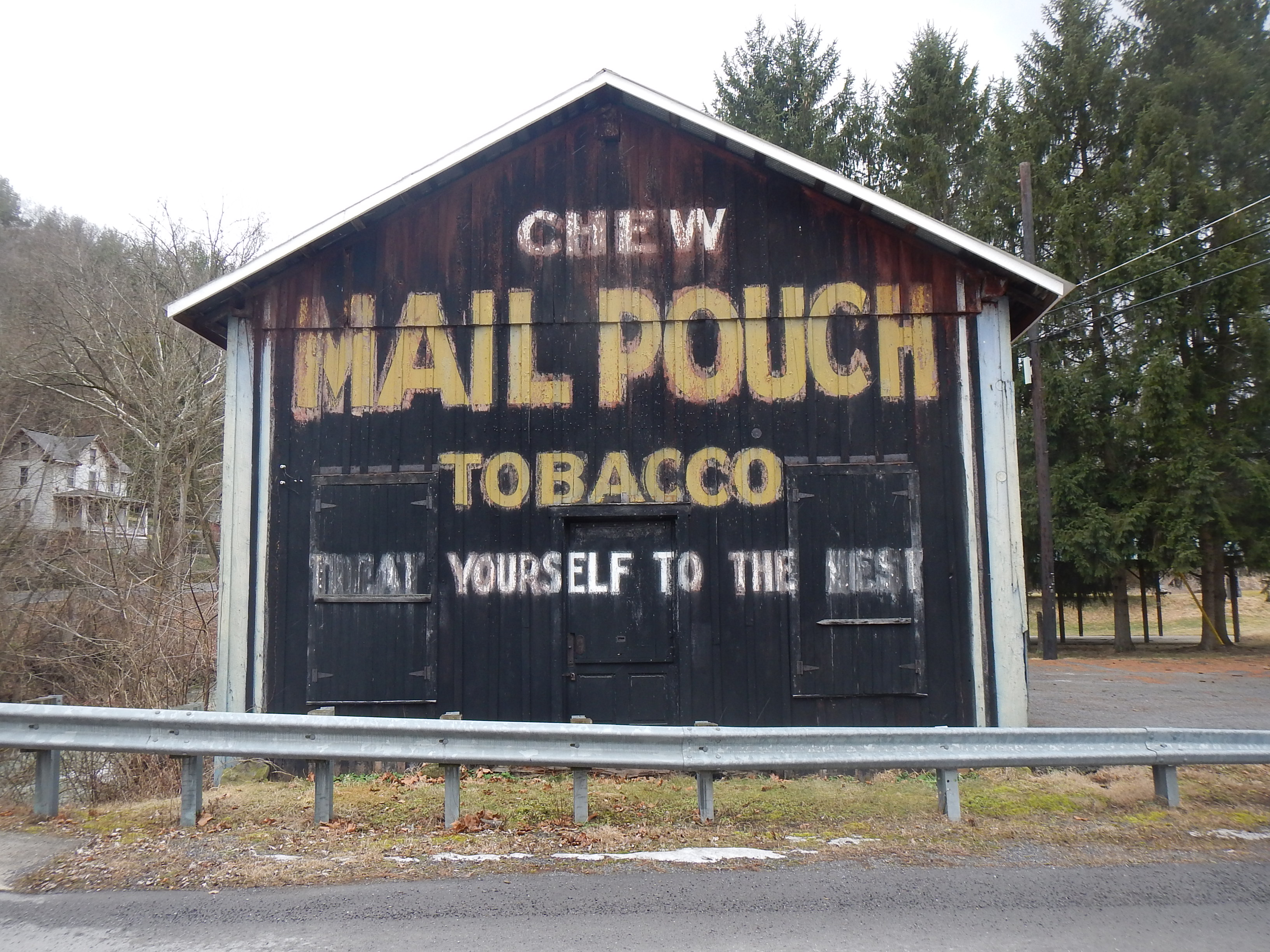
Shed from the Harvey Mann Axe Co., Axemann, PA.

The brothers’ partnership did not survive and in 1834 William sold out to Harvey, who carried on as the Harvey Mann Axe Co. Another brother, Stephen, would join Harvey, but illness limited his involvement. Upon Harvey's death in 1870, he was succeeded by a son, Harvey Jr., but a railroad accident in 1875 resulted in the son's early death at age 37. Factory supervision was transferred to J. Fearon Mann, a nephew and a son of William Jr., through a lease with Jane Burnside Mann, the widow of Harvey Sr. Business slowed in the 1880s as the use of cross-cut saws expanded. Around this time, steam power was added, and J. Fearon patented (no. D-2961) the "Red Mann" axe brand. However, in 1890 a "monopoly-trust" movement swept the country and – as described below – consolidation included the axe industry. American Axe and Tool Co. purchased the factory and in Oct 1892 after 64 years of operation, it was closed.

Today, a few structures remain as reminders of past activities. Axemann Spring still flows and Mann Road crosses the creek opposite the spring. A shed at the crossing was part of the factory. A large stone house, Mann's Edgefonte, sits near the spring house and was the home for Mann and his bride. The original Mann house sits across the street. Nearby stands the General Store and the United Methodist Church, built in 1882 and paid for by Mrs. Mann as tribute to her late husband.

=== Reedsville & Yeagertown (1835–1903, 1901–1923) ‒ William Mann Jr. & Sons ===
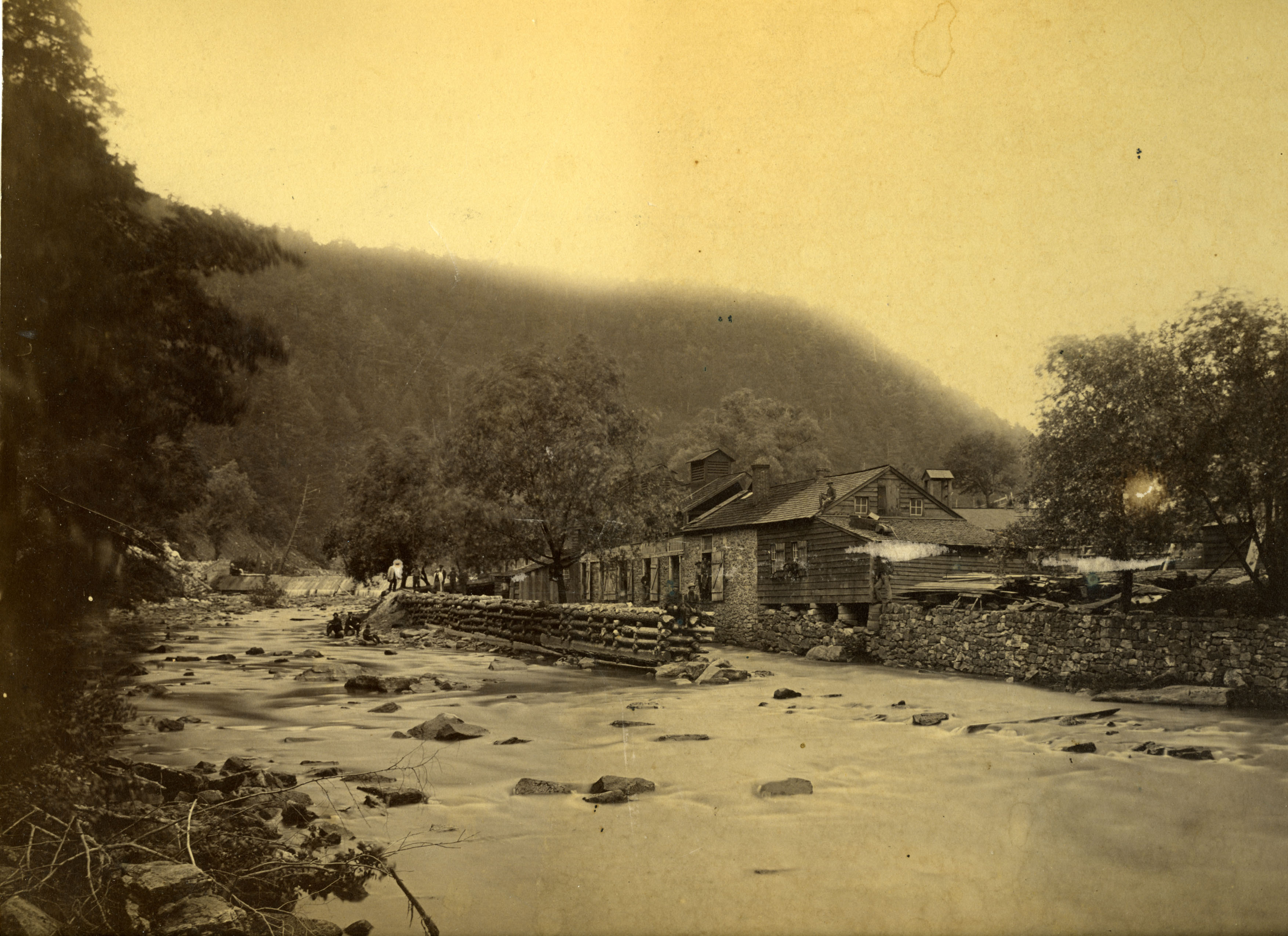
Axe Works at Mann Narrows (ca. 1885).

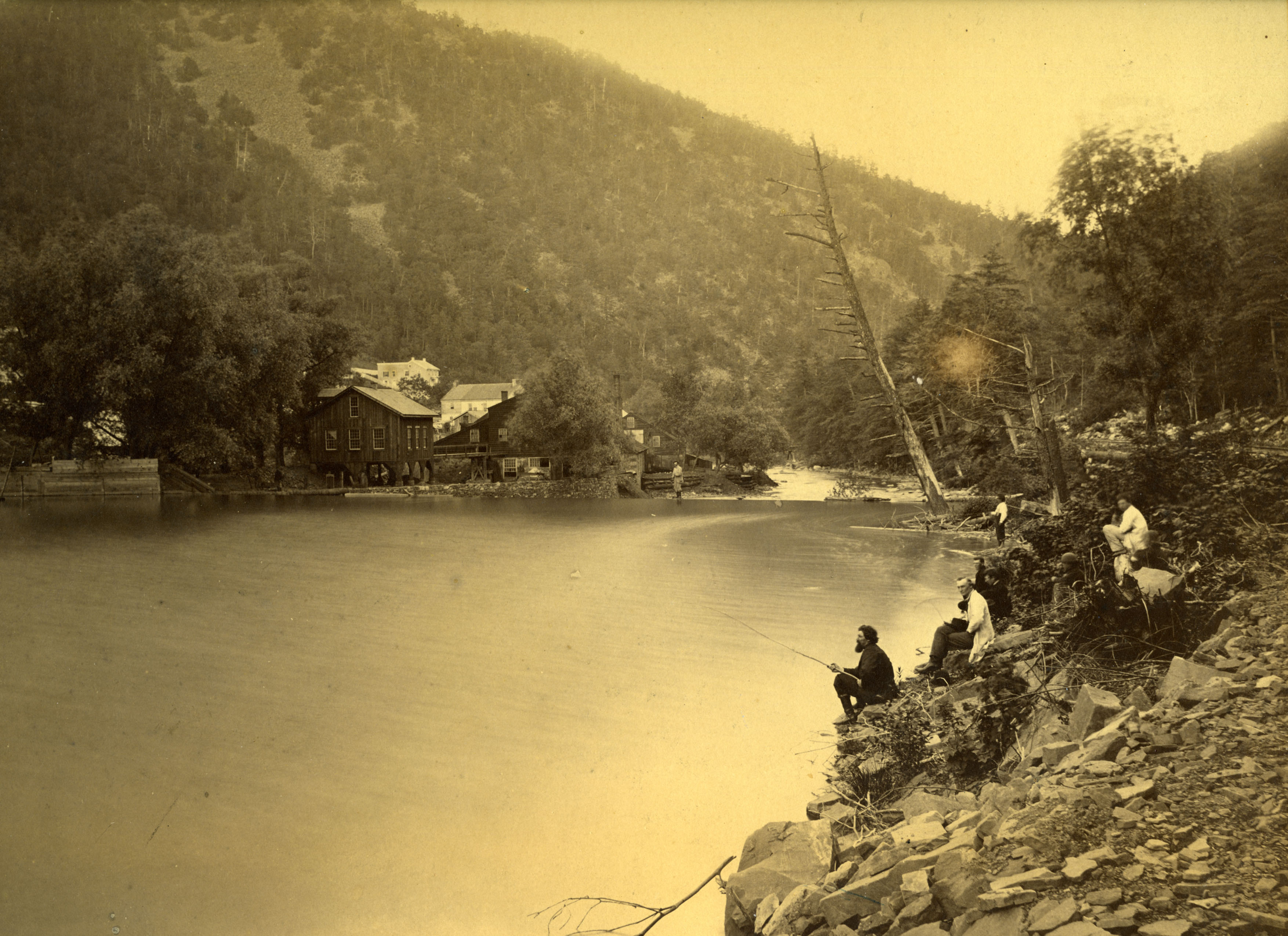
Mann Narrows (ca. 1885).

Mann Axe Factory Workers, Reedsville (ca. 1885).

After leaving Axemann, William Jr. first relocated to Mauch Chunk (now Jim Thorpe), and built an axe works. This operation failed due to weather or fire. In 1835 he returned to Mifflin County and built a factory in the narrows of Kishacoquillas Creek (now Mann Narrows), at the base of Jacks Mountain between Reedsville and Yeagertown. Around 1840 a second shop was acquired in Yeagertown, mainly devoted to finishing of axe heads and making of other edge tools. Two of William's brothers – Harris and Robert – were put in charge of the Lower Shop as part of William Mann & Co. Harris would disappear on a business trip to Philadelphia in 1840. With his opportunities limited by William's sons, Robert left in 1847 to start his own business at Mill Hall. A flood in Oct 1847 hastened his departure. When William Jr. died in 1855, the Reedsville works were left to his sons, James H. and William III. They were only 22 and 18 years old. While on a business trip in 1876, William III would die tragically in a boiler room explosion of a steamboat on the Ohio River. Several of James’ sons ‒ Frank, Walter, William H., and Percy ‒ would later join the business.

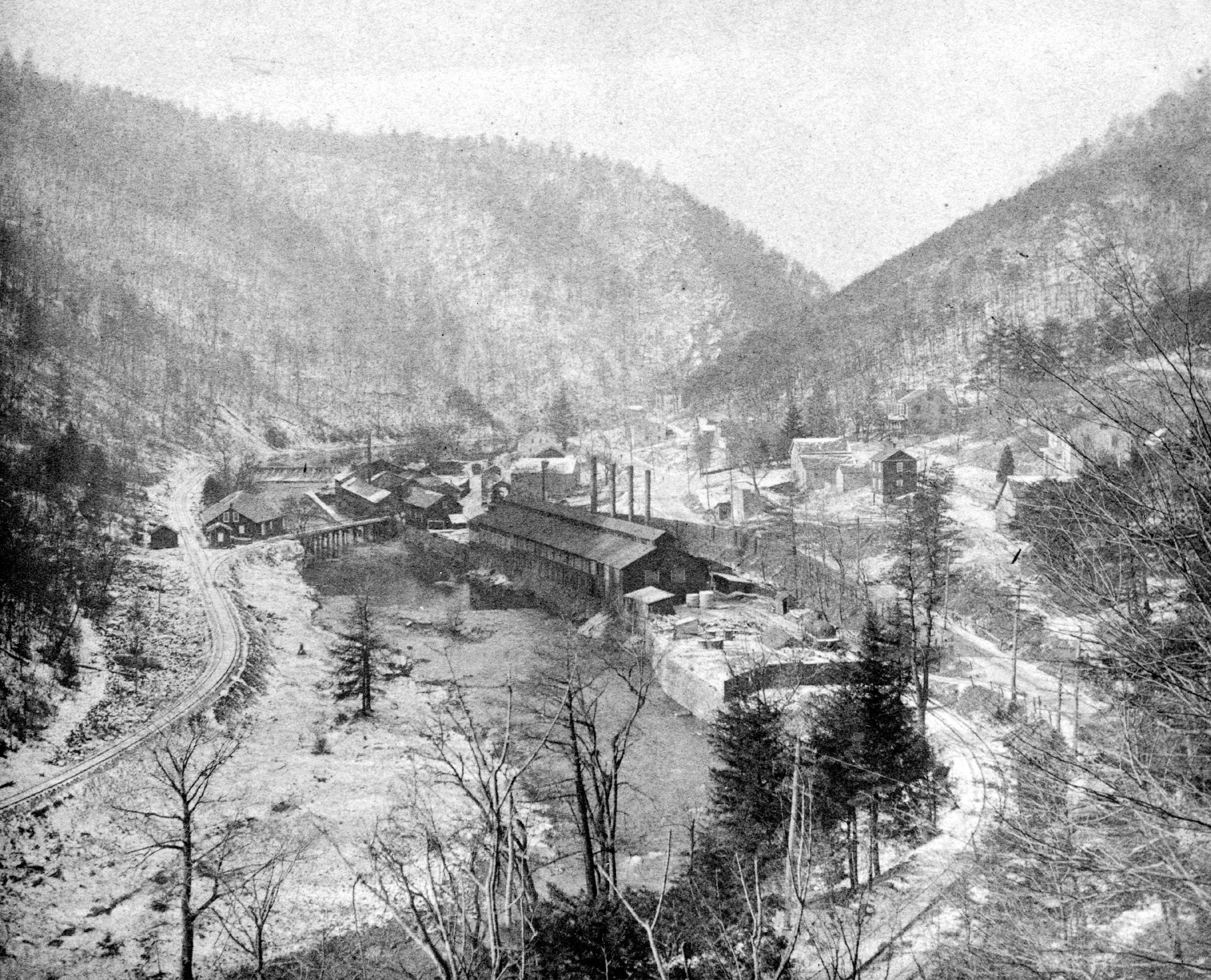
William Mann Jr. Axe Works (ca. 1900). The large building with smokestacks in the photo was added after 1877. An 1884 Mann catalog refers to the site as the "Hollis Works."

Factory capacity in 1855 was 500 axes per day. Brand names included "William Mann Superior" and "William Mann’s Celebrated Axes." In March 1868, James added a trademarked label (no. D-2948), "The Red Warrior," which became a prominent name in the industry. Location was indicated by the wording, "Manufactured Near Lewistown Penna." James also pioneered use of colorful paper labels. By the 1880s, the Reedsville factory was turning out an average of 1,400 axes per day. In November 1880 the plant was damaged extensively by fire. It took three months for production to resume.

In 1881, James acquired the Pennsylvania Axe Co., located at Cold Springs Forge near Tyrone in Blair County. This factory could produce about 400 axes per day and employed 40 workers. The Reedsville plant was expanded and steam power was added. Total capacity was now 2,000 axes per day. Around 1889 the plant was damaged again by a flood, and then in 1890 the factories were purchased by the Axe Trust. The Reedsville plant continued to operate and James was made treasurer, while Frank was appointed plant superintendent. The plants at Yeagertown and Tyrone were closed as the Trust attempted to reduce overall industry capacity and increase prices. Production was consolidated at Beaver Falls and Glassport, near Pittsburgh.

The Reedsville factory was finally closed in late 1903. Remnants of the works are still visible along the banks of Kish Creek, including portions of a mill race, protective stone walls, and footings of the dam and railroad spur. Above the creek sits the Mann Mansion, built in 1858. Downstream are remains of bridge foundations for a trolley-line that operated between Lewistown and Reedsville from 1900 to 1932. On the second floor of the Mifflin County Courthouse hangs a large painting (dated 1905) of the once active plant.

Around 1901, James left the Trust and built a new plant in Yeagertown. Early brand labels used by James H. Mann Co. included the "Juniata Axe" and "Blue Juniata." A fire destroyed the plant in 1911, but it was rebuilt using structural steel. After James died in 1904, his sons operated the plant until 1923, when it was sold to Collins. Reports are that Collins continued to produce axes at Yeagertown until 1927 or possibly as late as 1940. Mann Ave exists today as a reminder of the town's industrial past and at the end of Rosemont Ave sits the William Mann Jr. Mansion.

=== Mill Hall, PA (1849–1890, 1891–1926) ‒ Robert Mann and Sons ===
Operations in the Mill Hall area were started around 1840 by Willis Mann, who rented a blacksmith shop near Mackeyville and made axes on a small scale. This operation was terminated and Willis joined the Reedsville works as a factory superintendent. After several failures at other locations, Robert relocated to Mackeyville in 1847 to work in a retail store owned by Willis. In early 1849, Robert undertook a project to build an axe factory on Big Fishing Creek at a site owned by Saul McCormick. Robert was now 25 years old. Production started with only four employees, and just one remained after the first year. When McCormick died in 1857, he was found to be insolvent and had placed a mortgage on the property. The factory was purchased by Robert at the sheriff's sale for $6,000, paid for partly by sale of 100 acres of factory-owned land. In 1866, following the death of three children due to diphtheria, Robert decided to retire to farming and sold the Mill Hall works to James, who wanted to leave Reedsville over a family dispute. The transaction was never finalized. Robert was often in poor health and next enlisted management help from nephew Robert C., son of Willis. This relationship also was unsuccessful.

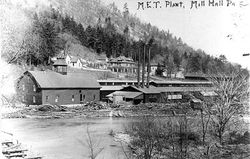
Mann Edge Tool above Mill Hall (ca. 1910).

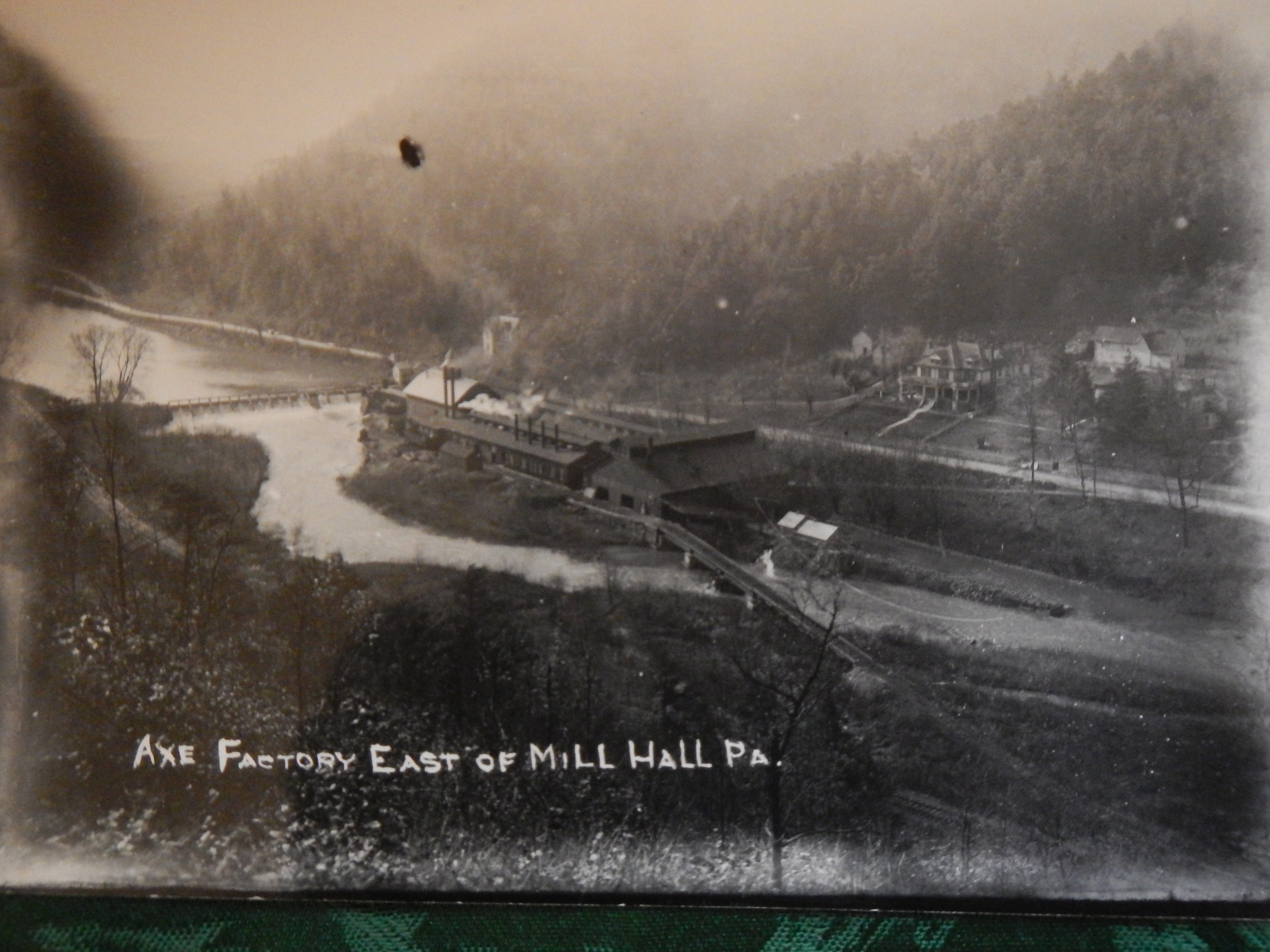
View of Mann Edge Tool, Mill Hall (ca. 1910).

In fall of 1877, the factory was entirely destroyed by fire. Some production was replaced by agreement with a nearby works in Lamar, the Loveland Axe Co. Fire losses were partially covered by insurance and the factory was up and running again in May 1878. By 1879, three of Robert's sons had joined the business. Growth prompted the next move, construction of a second or Lower Plant devoted to double-bit axes (located in Mill Hall on Water St.). A site in Flemington (on Walnut Dr.) also was acquired, which was part of Ricker & Sons Iron Works. In 1881, Robert decided to retire, with management of the Lower Plant entrusted to son Joseph, while Alfred and Thomas operated the Upper Plant. Both operations shared a common title, Robert Mann & Sons. The Upper Plant had a capacity of about 800 axes per day and employed 100 men; the Lower Plant made 400 axes per day and employed 65 men; and the Flemington works employed about 30 men, making 300 axes per day. In 1884, another son, William H., joined the business. Eventually, Alfred and William H. were given control of the Upper Plant. The Lower Plant was sold to Thomas with the youngest son, Robert Jr., as a partner. Joseph, however, withdrew for a time to try his hand at farming. All axes were to carry the brand of Robert Mann, Mill Hall. A flood in June 1889 destroyed portions of both plants, existing inventory, coal and other supplies. Shortly thereafter, the family decided to sell-out to the Axe Trust. Alfred and Thomas were made plant superintendents, with Joseph appointed as general superintendent. These arrangements did not survive and in 1892, Joseph was discharged from American Axe and Tool Co. Thomas also quit his position with AAT and put his energies to use in non-axe trades. Alfred would join a new operation, Mann Edge Tool, in Mill Hall.

=== The Axe Trust ‒ American Axe and Tool Co. (1890–1921) ===
In the late 1800s, industrial combinations took several forms. Some were loose price-fixing or market division agreements, cartels or pools that often enjoyed only short-term profits due to cheating. Others were more formal trusts or mergers of formerly independent competitors. Franchises were a third form of early trust consolidation. Transformed by improvements in transportation, communication, and finance, numerous corporations discovered that once geographically-isolated markets were now subject to vigorous price competition. A financial panic and worldwide depression in 1893 also resulted in slack output and excess capacity in many industries. The trust movement was the consequence. Estimates are that 3,000–5,000 independent firms disappeared through mergers between 1895 and 1904, and over 150 industries were transformed into near monopolies, including such vital industries as petroleum, steel, copper, railroads, ship building, farm machinery, telephone, telegraph, beef livestock, salt, and sugar. By standards of the day, the Axe Trust was a fairly modest affair. (It doesn't even appear in the famous volume by John Moody, The Truth about the Trusts, 1904.) Formed by consolidation of 14 companies in 1890, American Axe and Tool (AAT) controlled about half of axe production. All three Mann operations signed-on, with sale to AAT of all assets and equipment at Axemann, Reedsville, Tyrone, and Mill Hall. As a cost-reducing measure, these and other acquired plants were quickly closed. However, a number of axe producers were excluded from the Trust, including Kelly Axe (Charleston, WV); Warren Axe (Warren, PA); Dunn Edge Tool (Oakland, ME); Collins Co. (Collinsville, CT); Plumb Co. (Philadelphia, PA); and many others. Possibly the Trust believed these competitors were too small to worry about or could be forced into bankruptcy through cut-throat practices. Reflecting quality issues, some manufacturers’ advertising and labels indicated they were not part of the Trust (e.g., James Mann's "Anti-Trust" label). Several accounts indicate AAT was troubled by internal operation, labor unrest, and management problems. By 1912, ATT's scope of operations had fallen from 18 axe-works to only three plants at Glassport and Beaver Falls in Pennsylvania and Charleston, WV. The end of the Trust came in 1921. All assets of AAT were sold and transferred to Kelly Axe Mfg. Co., whose operations continued to expand. Further, members of the Mann family found that subordinate supervisory roles were not to their liking and either resigned or were discharged from AAT. Two of the Manns – James and Joseph ‒ started new businesses at Yeagertown, Mill Hall, and Lewistown.

=== Mann Edge Tool Co. at Lewistown (1893–2003) and Mill Hall, PA (1904–1926) ‒ Joseph R. Mann ===
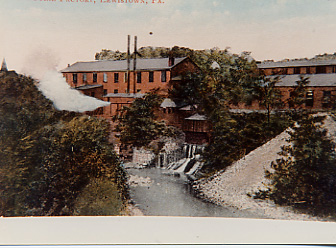
Mann Edge Tool in Lewistown, postcard view (ca. 1910).

After dismissal from AAT, Joseph moved to Lewistown and set-up shop in an old mill on Water St., near where Kish Creek empties into the Juniata River. A local business development group helped finance acquisition of the mill. Officers of Mann Edge Tool Co. included Joseph as president and Robert Jr. as secretary. Production began in Feb 1893. Plant capacity was 1,000 axes per day, with a workforce of over 100 men. In Apr 1893, a fire completely destroyed the new factory. By Sep 1893, the factory was again up-and-running, with a capacity of 1,200 axes per day. Attempts were made to improve the work environment. Around this time, Joseph developed a method for high-quality tempering of axe heads (patent no. 561,409, issued June 2, 1896). MET’s Double X axes carried patent labels such as “The XX Axe,” “Mann’s XX Warranted Quality,” and “XX Guaranteed.” Joseph in late 1903 purchased the Mill Hall plants from AAT. William H. was made superintendent and Alfred (A.C.) was made general manager. The Upper Plant was renovated and improved, while the Lower Plant was leased for other purposes. The Mill Hall plant was damaged by fire in Sep 1926, and not rebuilt by MET. Today, the Upper Plant site along Big Fishing Creek is a grassy field with a parking lot for fishermen. Footings of an early dam are visible and Axe Factory Run dumps into the creek at the factory site. One would never suspect that this was the site of a substantial industrial complex, but a historical marker in the parking lot accurately recounts what once existed at Mill Hall.

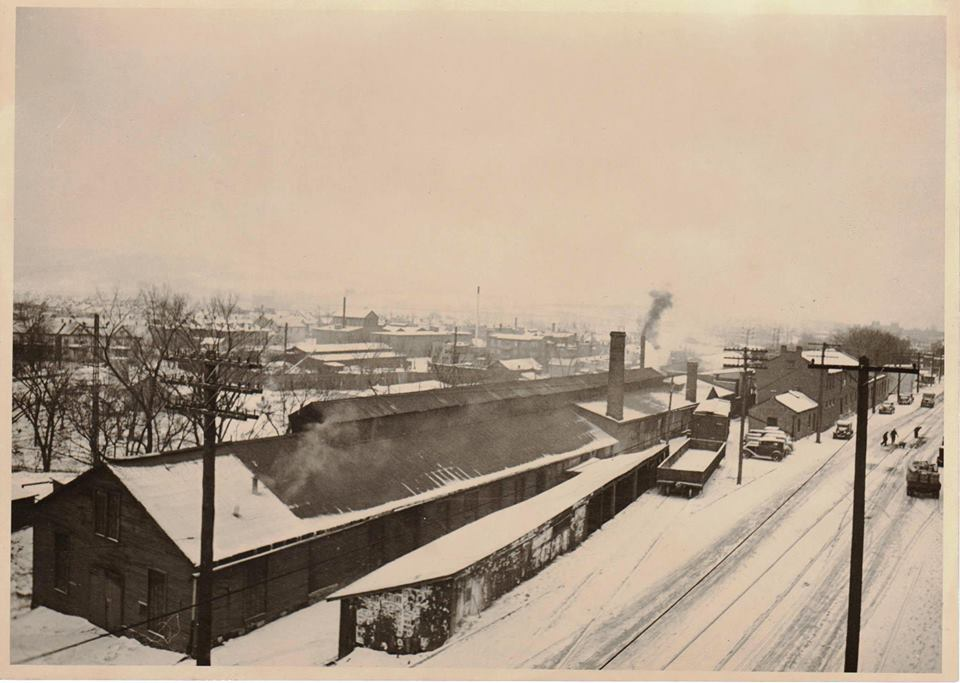
Mann Edge Tool Co. (ca. 1925). MET catalog.

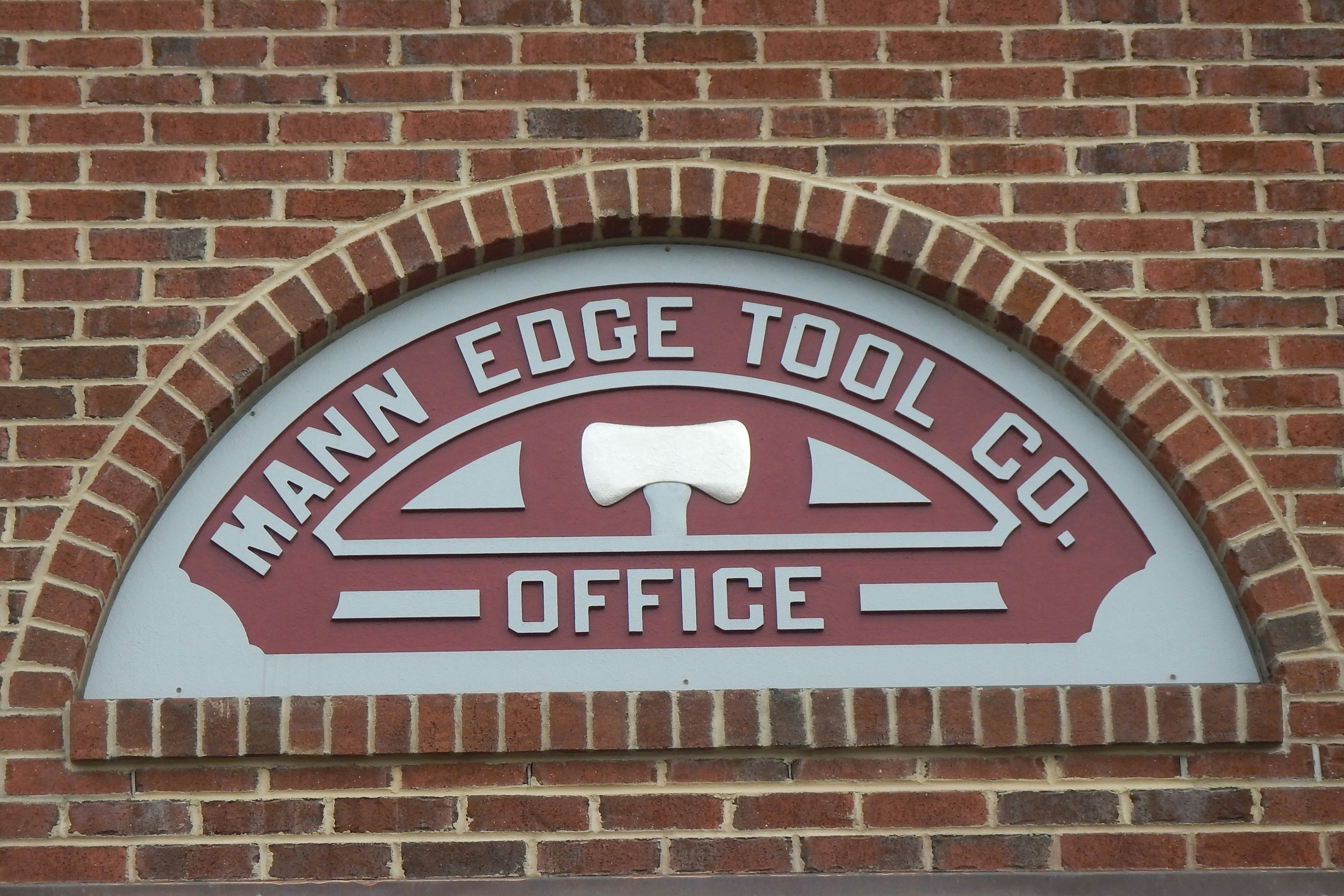
Mann Edge Tool, Lewistown, PA.

In a series of misfortunate events, Joseph and A.C. were removed by actions of the MET board of directors. The directors first tried to remove Joseph in 1909 due apparently to a drinking problem, but this directive was unsuccessful. Another fire at the Lewistown plant occurred on January 23, 1910. Two days after the fire, the board voted to remove Joseph as President and terminate A.C. Robert Jr. was a general sales manager, but he would leave MET in 1903 and died in Sep 1910 at age 44. By 1920, the remaining Manns were no longer with the company that carried their family name. Along with various ownership and management changes, MET continued to produce axes in Lewistown until 2003 when the company was sold to Truper Herramientas, a Mexican concern. The great plant was capable of producing 2,000 edge-tools per day, but equipment was removed and the plant was razed in 2012.

=== Legacy ===
Today, the factory site on Water St. is a senior citizen housing complex – Mann Edge Terrace. A replica of MET's office signage is placed outside the housing agency offices. After 175 years of entrepreneurial vigor, all Mann factories in central Pennsylvania disappeared from public view: Axemann (1828–1892); Reedsville (1835–1903); Yeagertown (1840–1927); Tyrone (1881–1890); Mill Hall (1849–1926); and Lewistown (1893–2003). Many axes produced by the Mann Family live on as items prized by collectors.

"And the wisest are those who make the best tools . . . and on merit alone for your orders compete" (verse in a Mann Edge Tool catalog).

== Other local and major axe producers in Pennsylvania ==
Many companies produced axes under aliases or for private brand labels (e.g., hardware stores). Others were producers on a small scale as, for example, local blacksmiths. As a result, the number of axe producers listed or found for Pennsylvania exceeds the number of actual producers of interest or importance. Given all of the mergers, brand-name acquisitions, name and location changes, alias companies, and other marketing gimmicks in the industry, it is often difficult to discern where and when an axe or hatchet was actually produced. For example, top-of-the line labels often differed from second- and third-quality, with latter marketed through hardware stores and other independent retailers. Relatively few axes carry a date-imprint.

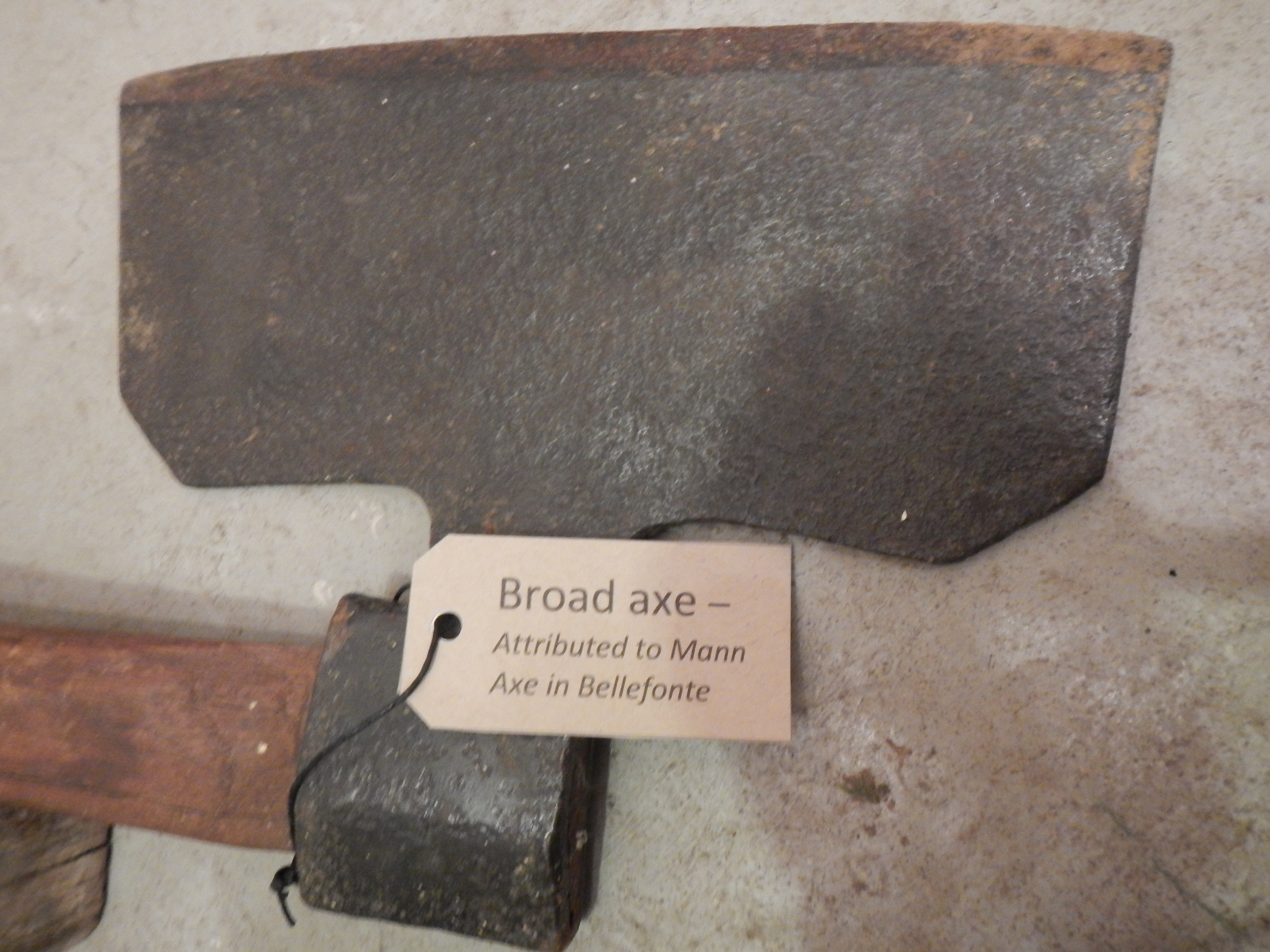
Broad Axe attributed to Mann Axe of Axemann, PA.

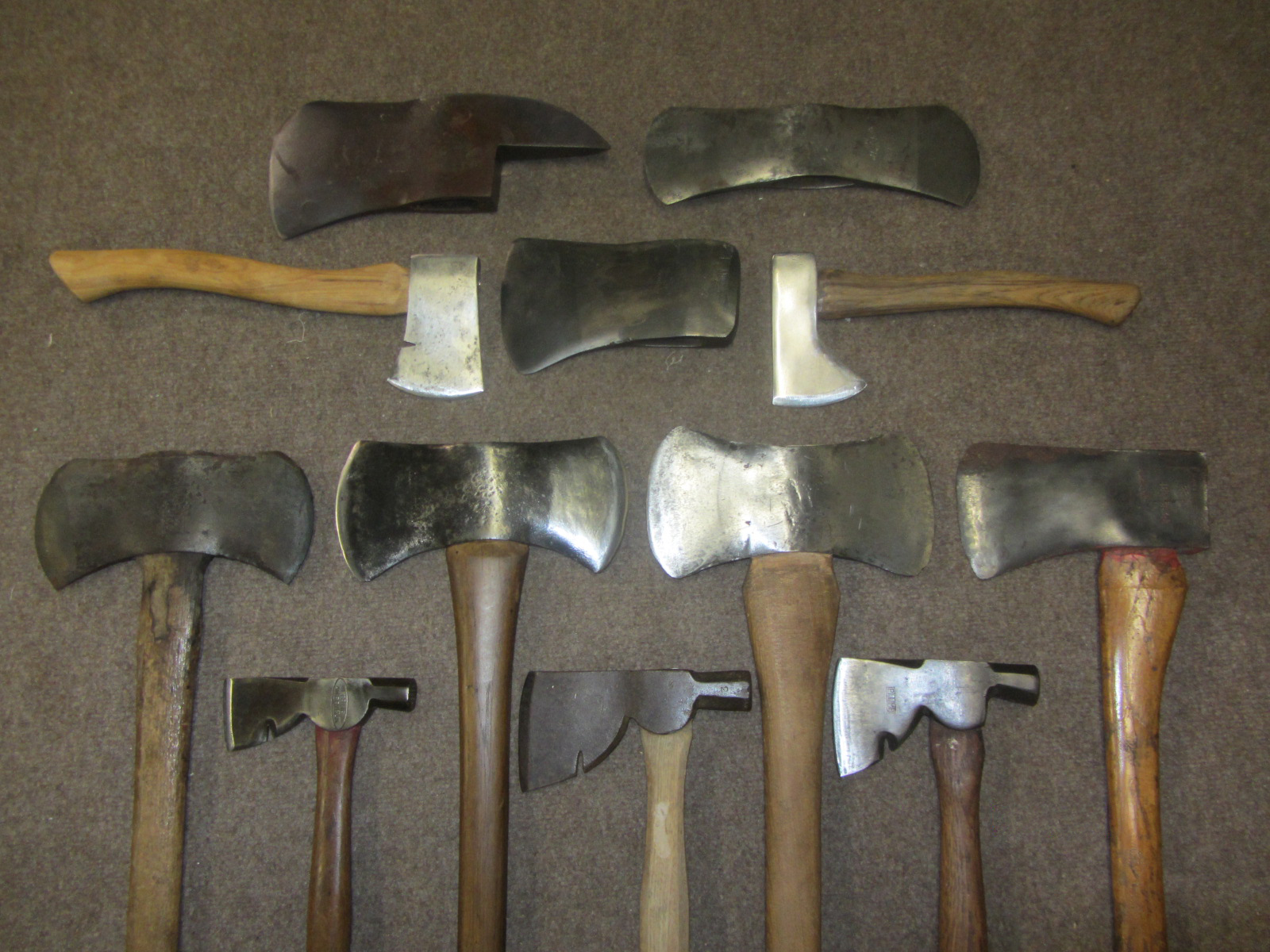
Pennsylvania Axes (left to right): Top row, Mann Edge Tool (Lewistown) & Sager Chemical "47" (Warren); 2nd row, Plumb "Scout," American Axe (Glassport) & Norlund "Voyageur" (Lewistown); 3rd row, James Mann "Blue Juniata" (Yeagertown), MET, Robert Mann (Mill Hall) & William Mann "boy’s axe" (Lewistown); and 4th row, MET, Beatty (Chester) & Plumb half hatchets.

== Axe producers in Centre, Clinton, and Mifflin Counties ==
Collins Co. (1923–1927?), Yeagertown, PA – Collins was established in Connecticut in 1826 and later built what is regarded as the first genuine axe factory. In 1923 Collins acquired James H. Mann Axe Co. of Yeagertown. It was closed in 1927 or possibly as late as 1940. In 1966, portions of Collins were acquired by Mann Edge Tool Co. Its great plant at Collinsville, CT was closed and equipment was moved to Lewistown. After MET purchased Collins, it used Collins name on many of its products, with the exception of fire axes. The Collins brand name was transferred to Truper in 2003.

Essington and McMullen (1841–1851)/C.K. Essington Jr. & Co. (1851–1880?), Milesburg, PA – C. Kephart Essington was initially a hammerer at General Miles’ iron works. The axe works employed seven men and could produce 200 axes per week. In 1851, McMullen left the business, and Essington and his sons continued on. An Essington axe is on display at the Milesburg Museum and Historical Society in Milesburg, PA.

James Hayes (ca. 1834–1840?)/ Hayes Axe Works (1841–1846?), Mackeyville & Lamar, PA – mentioned in J. Marvin Lee as an employee of Harvey Mann. About 1834, James Hayes left this employment and set-up a blacksmith shop at Mackeyville on Big Fishing Creek. This operation was apparently taken over by Willis Mann around 1840 and Hayes moved to nearby Belles Springs (now Lamar). A site on Big Fishing Creek in Lamar operated as an axe works, run by James and Nelson Hayes from about 1841 to 1846. Also spelled “Hays.”

Loveland Axe Co. (1838–1846)/ R. Loveland Axe Works (1846–1893), Milesburg & Lamar, PA – Reuben Loveland and Thomas Eddy worked for Harvey Mann from 1832–1838. They came from Connecticut. About 1838 they built a shop on Bald Eagle Creek near Milesburg, and then in 1846 moved to Clinton County and purchased the Hayes Axe Works. Production by Loveland reached 180–240 axes per day, with a workforce of 30–40 men. The dam at the factory site was destroyed by flood in 1889 and a fire occurred in 1893. After the fire, the factory may have been sold to a concern affiliated with Joseph Mann and its equipment possibly was transferred to Mill Hall. About 1895, Loveland joined the Axe Trust and its factory was closed.

William Mann Sr. (1828–1860), Unionville, PA – William Sr. made edge tools and axes in Johnstown, NY and Watertown, NY and he relocated to Bellefonte in 1828, with his wife and four younger children. Around 1832, he moved to a small farm near Unionville and leased a shop in Unionville (possibly on 1861 Walling Map as a "tin shop"). It is not known if he made axes in Unionville, but he did pass on these skills to his sons.

O.A. Norlund Co. (1968–1986?), Lewistown, PA – Norlund was a separate brand name of Mann Edge Tool Co. and the axes were produced in its Lewistown factory. A high-quality axe, many Norlund axes and hatchets have a distinctive Hudson Bay ("tomahawk") pattern. These are much prized by collectors. The axes were named in recognition of Olaf A. Norlund (1856-1931) of Williamsport, PA, who made a variety of tools and implements for logging, sawmills, sport fishing, and housewares. In 1959, MET purchased O.A. Norlund Co. and its product inventory. Norland brand axes were introduced in 1964 and would continue to be produced by MET until about 1985. Norlunds are sometimes referred to as the "Cadillac of axes," and were distributed through major outlets such as K-Mart and Eddie Bauer. The brand name was sold about 1988 to a California concern, E.Z. Sales, but were discontinued by that firm in 2007.

Ricker and Sons Co. (ca. 1854–1879), Flemington, PA – Ricker and Sons Iron Works is listed in the Pennsylvania Iron Furnace Sourcebook, but some reports include "axe" also in the company name. Furey notes an iron works that was located on Walnut St. (now Walnut Dr. in Flemington), near Bald Eagle Canal. Probably this was the location that was purchased by Robert Mann in 1879, but it seems likely that Ricker never produced axes. Ricker is not mentioned in Robert Mann's autobiography.

James C. Whitehill (ca. 1800–1821), Lemont, PA – mentioned in J. Marvin Lee and other historic accounts of Centre County. Sometimes credited with making the first double-bit axe in North America. Arrived in Centre County in 1789 at age 18 and later inherited his father David's farm (ca. 1809) near the base of Mt. Nittany. Relocated to Clarion County about 1821.

=== Major Axe Producers and Factories in Pennsylvania (operating after 1900) ===
American Axe and Tool Co. (1889–1921), Beaver Falls & Glassport, PA – AAT was formed in 1889 and constructed a large plant at Glassport, near Pittsburgh. This plant eventually employed 700–800 men. After the Trust was formed in 1890, operations were progressively consolidated at Beaver Falls (site of the former Hubbard Axe Co.) and eventually at Glassport. Due to mergers, AAT axes were produced under many names and labels, including the Manns. A "Glassport" imprint is an easy identifier. The president of AAT in 1912–1915 was James P. Kelly, a grandson of William C. Kelly, founder of Kelly Axe. In 1921, all assets of AAT were purchased by Kelly Axe Mfg. Co. of WV.

Barco Industries (1983-2016+), Reading, PA – established in 1983, Barco acquired Kelly's dies and brand names in 1987. Barco is now part of Phoenix Forge Group of companies. Barco's tool catalog lists the following PFG products: light duty camp axe; light duty hatchet; Kelly Perfect Axes; Kelly Woodslasher Axes; fire axe; sport/camp axe; half hatchets; and other specialty hatchets (broad, lathing, box, rig builder, wall board). Except possibly for Kelly axes, production locations are unknown.

Wm. Beatty & Son(s)/ Beatty Edge Tool Co. (1806–1924), Chester, PA – early production occurred at Waterville and Springfield, near Philadelphia. In 1870, a large plant was built at Chester, with a workforce of 30–40 men and capacity of over 700 edge-tools per day, including axes and hatchets. The operation was known as “Chester Edge Tool Works.” Beatty axes are distinguished by a stamped trademark of a bovine “steer.” Excellent articles on Beatty appear in Mar 1995, Jun 2007, and Sep 2007 issues of The Chronicle of the Early American Industries Association. Reproductions of Beatty's labels are in Lamond, Thomas C. (2011). Philadelphia axe manufacturers and related articles. Lynbrook, NY: Privately published.

C. Hammond & Son (1869–1920?), Philadelphia & Ogontz, PA – relatively little is known about this producer. Brand names included “C. Hammond,” “Ogontz Tool,” and “Tacony Solid Steel.”

Mack Axe Co. (1913–1920), Beaver Falls, PA – following a fire in 1909, AAT sold its Beaver Falls plant to Kelly, who in turn sold it to John Mack (a former AAT employee). He re-equipped the plant to produce edge tools of all types. It was a large operation, with a workforce of 135. In 1920, Mack was acquired by Winchester Repeating Arms Company, and its equipment was moved to New Haven, CN.

Fayette R. Plumb Co./ Plumb Co. (1856–1910, 1910–1986?), Philadelphia, PA – initially founded by Jonathan Yerkes in Frankfort, PA, the company moved to Church St. in Philadelphia around 1869. In 1887, Yerkes was bought out by a partner, Fayette Plumb, and a name change occurred around 1897. Yerkes & Plumb (Y & P) and Plumb products were often marketed under "Anchor Brand," with a distinctive "anchor" imprint. From 1910 to 1960, Plumb products were produced in St. Louis, MO. After 1960, production may have occurred in WV, NC, and Lewistown, PA. Plumb is now part of Apex Tool Group.

Standard Axe and Tool Works (1892–1912), Ridgway, PA – Standard completed construction of a new plant in 1892 to produce all types of axes, mining picks, etc. One product was "Black Eagle," marketed as a "chemical process" axe and painted black. In 1894, the plant was destroyed by fire, and rebuilt. In 1912, Standard was acquired by Warren, and the equipment was moved to St. Catharines, Ontario.

Warren Axe & Tool Co./ Sager Chemical (1893–1958), Warren, PA – founded by William Sager in 1893. In 1895, Sager received a patent (no. 547,361) for a chemical process to treat axe heads as a means of preventing rust and to increase durability. The brand name "Sager Chemical" was widely employed on its products. Warren expanded through a series of acquisitions of nearby producers: American Drop Forge (1907, Wayland, NY); Standard Axe & Tool Works (1912, Ridgway, PA); and Romer Axe (1916, Dunkirk, NY). Warren was acquired by Collins in 1950, but the plant continued to operate up to about 1958. Warren and Sager brand names may have continued to be used by Collins after 1958.

White Axe Co. (1836–1928), Honesdale, PA – established in 1836 by Ezekiel White, an axe factory was built in 1846 by a son, Ephraim, in Seelyville, near Honesdale. Some reports list Ezekiel as producing axes and edge tools as early as 1820. Destroyed by a fire in 1894, the factory was rebuilt and operated until about 1928. White Axe was sold in 1913 to L.J. Eddy. After 1928, MET may have purchased all assets and continued to market White’s brands. The company employed a number of euphemistic names, including “Common Sense Axe,” “Old Reliable,” and “Stub & Twist.”

== Bibliography ==
- Africa, J. Simpson (1883). History of Huntingdon and Blair Counties, Pennsylvania. Philadelphia: Everts. Describes forge operations near Tyrone, including William Mann Axe Factory at Cold Springs Forge.
- Canfield, James (1976). "County’s axe-making history began in 1835" and other titles. Lewistown Sentinel, Jan 20–23, 1976. Describes axe-making in Mifflin County.
- Connor, Matt (2011). "A peek at the past: When the Mann’s of Mill Hall made axe-making history.” Lock Haven Express, December 3, 2011. Account of Robert Mann’s operations in Mill Hall, including labor strike of 1882. Photo of Queen Anne style house in Lock Haven constructed by Thomas Mann after sale to the Axe Trust.
- Ellis, Franklin (1886). History of that part of the Susquehanna and Juniata Valleys embraced in the Counties of Mifflin, Juniata, Perry, Union and Snyder. Philadelphia: Everts. Describes William Mann works.
- Fagley, Paul T. (1997). "Man’s second tool: Mann’s first tool. The story of the Mann Family and their axe-making dynasty". Canal History and Technology Proceedings 16: 1–52 (National Canal Museum, Easton, PA). Thorough and well-documented.
- Furey, J. Milton (1892). Historical and biographical work or past and present of Clinton County. Williamsport, PA: Grit Printing. Brief description of Mann’s Mill Hall works, Loveland Axe, and Ricker Iron Works.
- Kagan, David (2007). “Is it Belles Springs, Yankeetown or Lamar?” Williamsport Sun-Gazette, November 18, 2007. A brief history of Lamar, including Loveland Axe works.
- Kagan, David (2009). “Mill Hall Part 1: Ax capital of world recalled.” Williamsport Sun-Gazette, November 19, 2009. A brief history of Mill Hall, including Robert Mann Axe Works and the Axe Maker’s Band.
- Kauffman, Henry J. (1994). American Axes: A Survey of their Development and their Makers. Elverson, Pennsylvania: Olde Springfield Shoppe. 152 pp. ISBN 188329412-6.
- Klenman, Allan; McPhail, Larry (2006, 2nd ed). Axe Makers of North America. Blaine, WA: Print & Copy Factory LLC. (Privately published, available from Larry McPhail). ISBN 0-9690755-4-5. Descriptions of individual manufacturers, including American Axe, Beatty, Kelly, Mack, Mann Edge Tool, Plumb, and Warren. List of PA producers.
- Lamond, Thomas C. (2011). Philadelphia axe manufacturers and related articles. Lynbrook, NY: Privately published. Describes Plumb, Beatty, Hammond, and several other minor producers.
- Lamond, Thomas C. (2012). The Mann Axe Making Dynasty and the Mann Edge Tool Co. Lynbrook, NY: Privately published. Very thorough, especially presentations of brand etchings and labels. Provides additional coverage of affiliated operations and aliases.
- Lamond, Thomas C. (2016). Web Site for coverage of other manufacturers.
- Lancaster, Doris E. (1979). “The Mann Axe Works: Pioneers build a factory,” and other titles. Centre Daily Times, Sep 11–13, 1979. Description of axe-making processes. Photos of Axemann factory ruins.
- Lee, J. Marvin (1975). From Juniata Iron to the Space Age. An industrial history of Centre County, 1793–1975. State College, PA: Privately published. A brief history of Mann Axe Co. Mentions other local axe-making operations in Lemont, Mackeyville, and Milesburg. Copy on file at Pattee Library. No references.
- Linn, John Blair (1883). History of Centre and Clinton Counties, Pennsylvania. Philadelphia: Everts. Description of operations at Axemann. A thorough description of operations at Mill Hall, including estimate that main shop had a length of 155 feet and forging shop had 13 fires.
- Magargel, Myrtle (1938). "History of Axemann, Centre Co., Pa." Originally appeared in the Centre Daily Times (Feb 23 – May 7, 1938). A historical account of Axemann, including Mann Axe Co. Detailed account of the Harvey Mann family.
- Mann, Robert (1897). An autobiography of Robert Mann with reminiscences of the Mann Family in the Counties of Centre, Mifflin, and Clinton, Pennsylvania. Philadelphia: Lippincott. Robert Mann died in Philadelphia on May 20, 1902. An obituary appeared in The Iron Age (May 29, 1902).
- McBride, Michael S. (2022). The Axe Trust: The Story of the American Axe and Tool Company. Privately published as an "Exploring Axe History Book."
- McBride, Michael S. (2023). A Brief History of the Mann Family and Their Involvement in the Axe Manufacturing Industry. Privately published as an "Exploring Axe History Book."
- McBride, Michael S. (2024). A Brief History of O.A. Norlund and the Axes, Hatchets, and Other Products that Bear His Name. Privately published as an "Exploring Axe History Book."
