= Axeman =

Axeman or Axemen may refer to:

== People ==
- Axeman of New Orleans, a serial killer in New Orleans circa 1918 – 1920
- John Axford, a Canadian professional baseball pitcher
- Nicholas Walters, Jamaican boxer whose nickname is "The Axe Man"
- Axemen, members of Black Axe (organized crime group), a criminal organisation that originated in Nigeria

== Sports ==
- Acadia Axemen of Acadia University
- Ajax Axemen, Canadian hockey team now known as the Ajax Attack
- Bemidji Axemen, American professional indoor football team
- Jacksonville Axemen, American semi-professional rugby league team
- Three Oaks Senior High School Axemen
- A participant in a woodchopping competition

== Film, television, music ==
- Axeman (film), a 2013 horror film
- Ax Men, an American reality television series
- The Axeman, a fictional character in American Horror Story: Coven, based on the Axeman of New Orleans
- The Axemen, a New Zealand band
- The Axe Man, a 1996 album by Smokin' Joe Kubek

== See also ==
- Axmann, a surname
- Hatchet man (disambiguation)
