= Axmann =

Axmann is a German surname. People bearing this surname are or were:

- Artur Axmann (1913–1996), German leader of the Hitler Youth
- Elisabeth Axmann (1926–2015), Romanian writer
- Heike Axmann (born 1968), German handball player
- Viktor Axmann (1878–1946), a pseudonym of Vladoje Aksmanović, Croatian architect

== See also ==
- Axman
- Axemann, Pennsylvania
