= Axemann, Pennsylvania =

Unincorporated community in Pennsylvania, U.S.

- Unincorporated community
- Location within the U.S. state of Pennsylvania Axemann (the United States)
- Coordinates: 40°53′24″N 77°45′37″W
- Country: United States
- State: Pennsylvania
- County: Centre
- Township: Spring
- Named for: Mann Axe Factory
- Elevation: 837 ft (255 m)
- Time zone: UTC-5 (Eastern (EST))
  - Summer (DST): UTC-4 (EDT)
- GNIS feature ID: 1168535

Axemann Village is an unincorporated community in Centre County, in the U.S. state of Pennsylvania.

== History ==
Axemann was named after the local Mann Axe Factory, which was founded by the Irish-American Mann family. The community once was a center of axe manufacturing in Pennsylvania.
