= Stately Wayne Manor =

American writer, musician and performer

Ernie Santilli is an American writer, musician and performer better known under the pen name of Stately Wayne Manor. He is best known for his participation in professional wrestling as the longtime magazine columnist for Power Slam and Wrestling World.

== Career ==
=== Music ===
Self-taught, Manor became competent in songwriting, synthesizer, drum set and related percussion instruments, harmonica, vocals and electric bass. He performed in a public demonstration with synthesizer inventor Dr. Robert Moog. He also wrote three articles for Modern Drummer magazine.

Stately is one of the "Sigma Kids," a group of eleven (among dozens) of David Bowie devotees who kept a ten-day vigil outside the studio and band's hotel during the recording of Young Americans rewarded afterwards with an exclusive listening party hosted by Bowie, as documented in Rolling Stone magazine. In 2007, a special CD/DVD re-release of the album features Manor visible in four photos in the enclosed booklet. Photos from the event also appear in books about Bowie and the original supermodel, Gia, as well as on the SWM website ‘Photos’ archive. The May 2014 issue of Britain's Mojo magazine, in an article chronicling the YA sessions, featured two photos from said booklet, including a never-before-released color version of one, capturing Stately in the foreground. The same photo ran in the September 2016 editing of Wax Poetics magazine. Inspired by the Sigma experience, Manor assembled a short-lived band, recruiting bassist Gail Ann Dorsey.

In the latter half of the Seventies, Stately became deeply immersed in the emerging punk rock music scene. He was a regular and occasional performer at Philadelphia's Hot Club and frequented NYC venues such as CBGB and Max's Kansas City, regularly sleeping on the couch of future recording-engineer superstar Bob Clearmountain while in New York. Manor was also slated to drum behind former Sex Pistol Sid Vicious on the Philly date of the latter's aborted "solo tour." Additionally, he wrote the liner notes for the aborted Cheetah Chrome debut solo album on Polish Records. (Stately did receive a 'Thank You' on that label's release "Siren" by Ronnie Spector.)

=== Professional wrestling ===
Manor later regained interest in a childhood hobby, professional wrestling, and was particularly drawn towards the "heel" (‘bad guy’) characters.

Manor eventually broke into the sport as a feature writer in 1984 and, in 1986, as a pro-heel columnist for Wrestling World magazine. Manor expanded into color commentating, managing grapplers, performing in-ring skits and ghostwriting wisecracks for the performers. Manor was a color commentator for the ECW promotion (in their pre-Extreme days). He is also the first American magazine writer to give international exposure to Sabu, Rey Misterio, Sean Waltman, John Cena, Sandman and Victoria/Tara (Lisa Marie Varon).

During 1993, in the midst of his 17-year Wrestling World’ employment, Manor debuted a second villain-praising column in the British Power Slam. The combined consecutive tenures makes Manor the longest-running magazine columnist in pro wrestling history.

=== Movies Unlimited ===
While all of the above was allegedly happening, Manor worked full-time as an assistant manager at the Movies Unlimited retail store in Drexel Hill, PA.

== Other media ==
=== Print ===
Stately takes on the general public via ‘’On Manor's Mind’’ rants for the alternative set, and rages about inane celebrities in his SNAPS—Suckas Needing A Pimp Slap—Of The Month column.

Stately is a long-time commentator on the "so-bad-they're-good" film genre, most notably as the author of the column "Manor on Movies." Established as one of the earliest ongoing series dedicated to the critical analysis and appreciation of low-budget and cult cinema, the column is syndicated across several platforms, including The Spinning Image. Stately is also currently developing a book-length project focused on the horror and science fiction subgenres within the category he classifies as "junkfilms."

Other journals that have carried Stately's work, under the Manor moniker or otherwise, include Inside Karate, Video Review, People (Australia), Filmfax, Tuber’s Voice (the originators of the term ‘couch potato’), Comic Release, Carbon 14, and Brutarian, to name a few. In addition, he has repeatedly scored ‘Dishonorable Mention’ in the annual international Bulwer-Lytton Fiction Contest, where the challenge is to compose the worst possible opening line for a novel.

=== Radio and television ===
In character, Manor has guested on radio programs throughout the US and Canada, including morning drive time shows in Philadelphia and New York City.

Manor was once booked on Sneak Previews Goes Video—an Eighties reworking of the popular movie-review program—to discuss wrestling videos, but the segment was red-lighted by PBS executives who considered the subject matter "too lowbrow."

=== Video ===
Stately can be heard providing color commentary on two volumes from the Pro Wrestling From Japan series, Bam Bam Bigelow And Friends, and Bruiser Brody Memorial, both featuring the American stars as they toured with the New Japan Pro-Wrestling promotion in the late Eighties. A few tapes of his work with primordial ECW were briefly marketed, as well. In July 2019 WWE Network made some of these extremely early ECW matches available in their Hidden Gems section.

== Personal life ==
Manor never moved out of his parents' house. He never married and was never known to be in a long-term relationship.
