= Power Slam =

Professional wrestling magazine

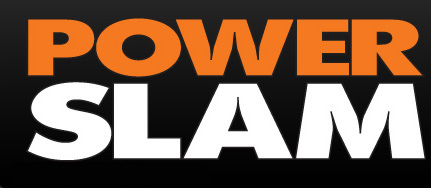
- Editor: Findlay "Fin" Martin
- Frequency: Monthly
- Publisher: SW Publishing
- Founded: 1991
- Final issue: 14 July 2014
- Country: United Kingdom
- Language: English

Power Slam was an independent non-kayfabe magazine published in the United Kingdom from 1991–2014 by SW Publishing, with co-founders Findlay Martin and former WCW Magazine owner Colin Bowman. Power Slam was Europe's best-selling pro wrestling publication.

The magazine began life as Superstars of Wrestling in 1991 before altering its name after 30 issues in July 1994. It was released on a Thursday every five weeks, and provided recent results, colour photographs from live events, articles on historical and contemporary matters within the business, and exclusive interviews with prominent industry figures. Power Slam stopped offering subscriptions on 4 February 2014, in anticipation of the closure of the magazine, which occurred on 14 July with the release of issue 237.

In September 2020, Power Slam's spiritual successor was launched, when Inside The Ropes Magazine debuted with its retro design, and used several of Power Slam's features, including "What's Going Down" and "Mat Musings". Findlay "Fin" Martin is a contributor and writer for the magazine.

== Columnists ==
- Findlay "Fin" Martin, editor. He has an edition of the wrestling blooper web series, Botchamania, named for him. In 2014, Martin joined the Wrestle Talk TV podcast, WrestlePod. As of 2017, he co-hosts the Power Slam Podcast with Inside the Ropes.
- Mohammed Chatra, also known for presenting Pro Wrestling Noah on the UK's satellite sports channel TWC Fight! (formerly The Wrestling Channel).
- Greg Lambert, a British journalist, wrestling manager and promoter for the XWA.
- Rob Butcher, UK tape trader and writer.
- Patty Therre, former executive editor of WCW Magazine.
- Ernie "Stately Wayne Manor" Santilli, the only featured columnist to – as Stately Wayne Manor – maintain kayfabe, living up to his image as an ultra-conceited heel manager. As Manor, Santilli joined the staff halfway through the "Superstars of Wrestling" period.
- Oliver Hurley, author of Wrestlings 101 Strangest Matches
- Phil Jones (also a photographer)
- Ant Evans, formerly editor of boxing news site Seconds Out and writer for Boxing Monthly magazine. Evans now works for the UFC in the UK.
- Danny Flexen, formerly Publishing Manager of Boxing News and writer for Boxing Monthly magazines. Flexen now works as Content Director for Seconds Out.
- Matthew Randazzo V, author of Ring of Hell: The Story of Chris Benoit & The Fall of the Pro Wrestling Industry
- Alex Dale
- Neil Docking, a journalist working in the North West of England, now the Daily Mirror's wrestling writer.

== Content ==
The magazine was geared more to pro-wrestling than sports entertainment, covering promotions from all over the world (particularly Japanese puroresu), and has also on occasion covered MMA events. This was often partly to do with involvement of professional wrestling personalities, for example Mirko "Cro Cop" Filipović appeared in the pages of Power Slam numerous times due to Japanese promoters (especially K-1) pitting him against wrestlers in legitimate shoot fights.

Power Slam took an impartial view on the wrestling world being non affiliated with any wrestling promotion or organization. Contributor Greg Lambert has been an on-screen talent and behind-the-scenes promoter/booker for Britain's Frontier Wrestling Alliance but the magazine never crossed the grounds of journalistic integrity by inviting/allowing him to promote his real-life business.

A 2009 Power Slam interview with Triple H was subject to scrutiny from the Pro Wrestling Torch, who criticized Triple H's comments within it.

In 2012, Fin Martin defended CM Punk against ongoing rumours that Punk's "straight edge" lifestyle was a ruse. Martin wrote: "We have spoken to many people over the last eight years who have been to bars and nightclubs with Punk and/or traveled with him in Europe and the U.S. and Canada, and all report that Punk has invariably abstained from alcohol, illegal drugs and tobacco."

Power Slam was used as a reference in the Jim Cornette, James Dixon, and Benjamin Richardson book, Titan Sinking: The decline of the WWF in 1995.

== PS 50 ==
Every year the magazine presented the PS 50 (akin to the PWI 500) listing the 50 wrestlers whom the writers believed to have had the most successful year, in terms of workrate and performance. 2012 winner Hiroshi Tanahashi was the first wrestler to be ranked number one in two consecutive PS 50s, followed by Austin Aries and CM Punk. There was also an annual reader's poll for various awards ('match of the year', etc.) similar to that carried out by RSPW.

Despite their criticisms, their readers polls always crowned WWE as the top promotion of the year until 2005, where TNA overtook the company for the first time. TNA would follow up that victory with another in the 2006 reader awards, although in 2007 the percentage of votes for TNA dropped considerably.

== PS 50 podium ==
#	Name	Country	1	2	3	4-50	Total	First appearance	Last appearance	Federation
1	Kurt Angle	USA	3	3	0	5	11	2000	2012	WWE, TNA
2	Shawn Michaels	USA	3	1	2	4	10	1994	2008	WWE
3	Chris Benoit	Canada	2	1	1	5	9	1995	2006	WWE, WCW, NJPW
4	Stone Cold Steve Austin	USA	2	0	0	3	5	1996	2001	WWE, WCW
5	Kenta Kobashi	Japan	1	2	1	6	10	1994	2005	AJPW, NOAH
6	A.J. Styles	USA	1	0	1	4	6	2003	2012	TNA
7	Mitsuharu Misawa	Japan	1	0	0	9	10	1994	2005	AJPW, NOAH
8	Triple H	USA	1	0	0	9	10	1995	2008	WWE, WCW
9	Edge	Canada	1	0	0	8	9	1999	2007	WWE
10	Bret Hart	Canada	1	0	0	5	6	1994	1999	WWE, WCW
11	Keiji Mutoh	Japan	0	2	0	6	8	1994	2008	NJPW, AJPW, WCW
12	Kenta	Japan	0	1	2	3	6	2003	2012	NOAH
13	Nigel McGuinness	England	0	1	1	1	3	2006	2008	ROH
14	Jushin Thunder Liger	Japan	0	1	0	10	11	1994	2005	NJPW
15	Koji Kanemoto	Japan	0	1	0	9	10	1995	2005	NJPW
16	Yuji Nagata	Japan	0	1	0	10	11	1994	2005	NJPW, WCW
17	Bryan Danielson	USA	0	1	0	5	6	2003	2012	ROH, WWE
18	Toshiaki Kawada	Japan	0	0	1	9	10	1994	2005	AJPW
19	Eddie Guerrero	USA	0	0	1	8	9	1994	2005	WWE, WCW, NJPW
20	Dean Malenko	USA	0	0	1	5	6	1995	2000	WWE, WCW
21	Mick Foley	USA	0	0	1	5	6	1994	2004	WWE, WCW, TNA
22	Samoa Joe	USA	0	0	1	5	6	2003	2012	TNA, ROH
23	The Rock	USA	0	0	1	4	5	1999	2002	WWE
24	Low Ki	USA	0	0	1	4	5	2001	2012	TNA, NJPW

== Awards ==
=== Wrestler of the Year ===
- 1993 Big Van Vader
- 1994 Diesel
- 1995 Shawn Michaels
- 1996 Shawn Michaels
- 1997 Stone Cold Steve Austin

- 1998 Stone Cold Steve Austin
- 1999 The Rock
- 2000 Triple H
- 2001 Stone Cold Steve Austin
- 2002 Kurt Angle

- 2003 Kurt Angle
- 2004 Chris Benoit
- 2005 Shawn Michaels
- 2006 Edge
- 2007 Bryan Danielson

- 2008 Edge
- 2009 CM Punk
- 2010 Kurt Angle
- 2011 Randy Orton
- 2012 CM Punk

=== Babyface of the Year ===
- 1993 Bret Hart
- 1994 Bret Hart
- 1995 Shawn Michaels
- 1996 Shawn Michaels
- 1997 Stone Cold Steve Austin

- 1998 Stone Cold Steve Austin
- 1999 The Rock
- 2000 The Rock
- 2001 The Rock
- 2002 Rob Van Dam

- 2003 Eddie Guerrero
- 2004 Eddie Guerrero
- 2005 Shawn Michaels
- 2006 Shawn Michaels
- 2007 Jeff Hardy

- 2008 Jeff Hardy
- 2009 Jeff Hardy
- 2010 Daniel Bryan
- 2011 CM Punk
- 2012 Jeff Hardy

=== Heel of the Year ===
- 1993 Big Van Vader
- 1994 Owen Hart
- 1995 Davey Boy Smith
- 1996 Stone Cold Steve Austin
- 1997 Bret Hart

- 1998 Vince McMahon
- 1999 Triple H
- 2000 Triple H
- 2001 Stone Cold Steve Austin
- 2002 Kurt Angle

- 2003 Brock Lesnar
- 2004 Triple H
- 2005 Kurt Angle
- 2006 Edge
- 2007 Randy Orton

- 2008 Edge
- 2009 CM Punk
- 2010 The Miz
- 2011 Christian
- 2012 CM Punk

=== Match of the Year ===
- 1993 Shawn Michaels Vs Marty Jannetty (19 July)
- 1994 Razor Ramon Vs Shawn Michaels (WrestleMania X)
- 1995 Shawn Michaels Vs Razor Ramon (SummerSlam 1995)
- 1996 Shawn Michaels Vs Mankind (In Your House: Mind Games)
- 1997 The Undertaker Vs Shawn Michaels (Badd Blood: In Your House)
- 1998 Mankind Vs The Undertaker (King of the Ring 1998)
- 1999 Hardy Boyz Vs Edge and Christian (No Mercy 1999)
- 2000 Hardy Boyz Vs Dudley Boyz Vs Edge and Christian (SummerSlam 2000)
- 2001 Stone Cold Steve Austin Vs The Rock (WrestleMania X-Seven)
- 2002 Shawn Michaels Vs Triple H (SummerSlam 2002)

- 2003 Kurt Angle Vs Chris Benoit (Royal Rumble 2003)
- 2004 Chris Benoit Vs Shawn Michaels Vs Triple H (WrestleMania XX)
- 2005 Kurt Angle Vs Shawn Michaels (WrestleMania 21)
- 2006 The Undertaker Vs Kurt Angle (No Way Out 2006)
- 2007 The Undertaker Vs Batista (WrestleMania 23)
- 2008 Edge Vs The Undertaker (Summerslam 2008)
- 2009 The Undertaker Vs Shawn Michaels (WrestleMania XXV)
- 2010 The Undertaker Vs Shawn Michaels (WrestleMania XXVI)
- 2011 CM Punk Vs John Cena (Money in the Bank 2011)
- 2012 The Undertaker Vs Triple H (Wrestlemania XXVIII)

=== Card Of The Year ===
- 1994 ECW The Night the Line was Crossed
- 1995 WWF SummerSlam 1995
- 1996 WWF King of the Ring 1996
- 1997 WWF In Your House: Canadian Stampede
- 1998 WWF SummerSlam 1998
- 1999 WWF No Mercy
- 2000 WWF Backlash
- 2001 WWE WrestleMania X-Seven
- 2002 WWE SummerSlam 2002
- 2003 WWE WrestleMania XIX

- 2004 WWE WrestleMania XX
- 2005 ECW One Night Stand
- 2006 WWE WrestleMania 22
- 2007 WWE WrestleMania 23
- 2008 WWE WrestleMania XXIV
- 2009 TNA Turning Point 2009
- 2010 WWE Wrestlemania XXVI
- 2011 WWE Money in the Bank (2011)
- 2012 WWE Extreme Rules (2012)

=== Tag Team ===
- 1993 The Heavenly Bodies, Tom Prichard and Jimmy Del Ray
- 1994 The Public Enemy, Rocco Rock and Johnny Grunge
- 1995 The Public Enemy, Rocco Rock and Johnny Grunge
- 1996 Owen Hart and Davey Boy Smith
- 1997 Owen Hart and Davey Boy Smith
- 1998 The New Age Outlaws, Billy Gunn and Road Dogg Jesse James
- 1999 Hardy Boyz, Jeff Hardy and Matt Hardy
- 2000 Edge and Christian
- 2001 The Dudley Boyz, Bubba Ray Dudley and D-Von Dudley
- 2002 Los Guerreros, Eddie Guerrero and Chavo Guerrero Jr.

- 2003 Shelton Benjamin & Charlie Haas
- 2004 Rob Van Dam and Rey Mysterio
- 2005 Joey Mercury and Johnny Nitro
- 2006 LAX, Homicide and Hernandez
- 2007 The Briscoe Brothers, Mark Briscoe and Jay Briscoe
- 2008 John Morrison and The Miz
- 2009 Jeri-Show, Chris Jericho and The Big Show
- 2010 The Motor City Machine Guns, Chris Sabin & Alex Shelley
- 2011 Air Boom, Kofi Kingston & Evan Bourne
- 2012 Bad Influence, Christopher Daniels & Kazarian

=== Character of the Year ===
- 1995 The Undertaker
- 1996 Goldust
- 1997 Stone Cold Steve Austin
- 1998 Chris Jericho
- 1999 The Rock
- 2000 Kurt Angle

- 2001 Stone Cold Steve Austin
- 2002 Kurt Angle
- 2003 John Cena
- 2004 John Bradshaw Layfield
- 2005 Mr. Kennedy
- 2006 Mr. Kennedy

- 2007 Santino Marella
- 2008 Santino Marella
- 2009 CM Punk
- 2010 The Miz
- 2011 CM Punk
- 2012 Daniel Bryan

=== Most Abysmal Wrestler of the Year ===
- 1993 Giant Gonzalez
- 1994 Jim Duggan
- 1995 Hulk Hogan
- 1996 Hulk Hogan/Hollywood Hogan
- 1997 Hollywood Hogan
- 1998 The Warrior
- 1999 Hollywood Hogan/Hulk Hogan

- 2000 David Flair
- 2001 The Undertaker
- 2002 The Big Show
- 2003 Triple H
- 2004 John Heidenreich
- 2005 John Cena
- 2006 The Great Khali

- 2007 The Great Khali
- 2008 Vladimir Kozlov
- 2009 Mark Henry
- 2010 John Cena
- 2011 John Cena
- 2012 The Great Khali
