= Stanley Weston =

American sports photographer (1919–2002)

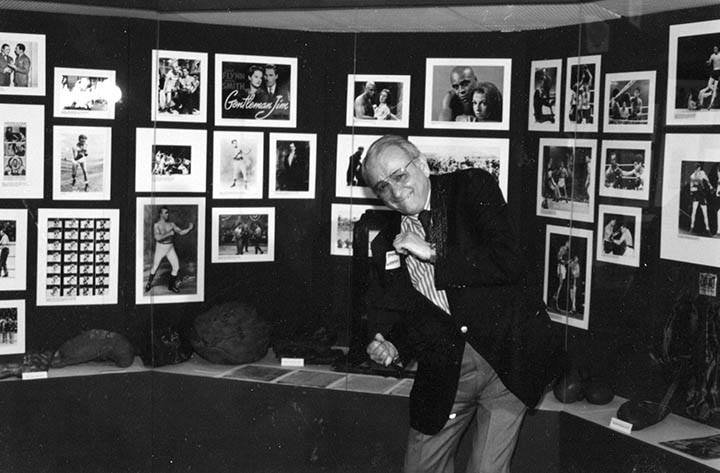
- Weston, posing in front of boxing memorabilia
- Born: September 25, 1919; The Bronx, New York
- Died: April 11, 2002 (aged 82); Long Island, New York
- Occupations: Publisher sportswriter photographer

Stanley Weston (né Weinburger; September 25, 1919 – April 11, 2002) was an American publisher, sportswriter, artist and photographer. He promoted the sport of boxing and professional wrestling throughout his career. Weston started Pro Wrestling Illustrated, a professional wrestling magazine, as well as 20 other magazines over his career. Weston was inducted into the International Boxing Hall of Fame in 2006.

== Early life ==
Weston was born to Bessie (Biegeleisen) and Jacob Weinburger in the Bronx. His family eventually moved out to Long Island and became neighbors with Nat Fleischer, publisher of The Ring magazine. Weston soon became enamored with the sport of boxing when his father brought home a copy Fleischer's magazine and in 1937 Fleischer hired him as copy boy.

== Military service ==
Weston was a World War II and Korean War veteran who enlisted in the United States Army in 1941 and was promoted to second lieutenant in 1943. He remained on active duty until 1946 when he transitioned into the reserves. Weston returned to active duty for service in the Korean War and then once again transitioned back to the reserves after the war. He retired from Air Force Reserves in 1966 at the rank of major.

== Career ==
After being hired by Fleischer, Weston was soon colorizing black and white portraits of boxing figures with oils. In December 1939, Weston, a budding artist, painted a portrait of Billy Conn that would be the first of 57 Ring covers painted by Weston. Daughter Toby Weston Cone said of her father, he "never liked going to boxing matches but was extremely interested in the sport. He felt it paralleled life in many ways."

Weston's work in the publishing industry was interrupted by World War II when served in the United States Army from 1941 until 1946. He returned to civilian life and The Ring in 1946, but left the publication in 1951 and once again returned to the Army during the Korean War.

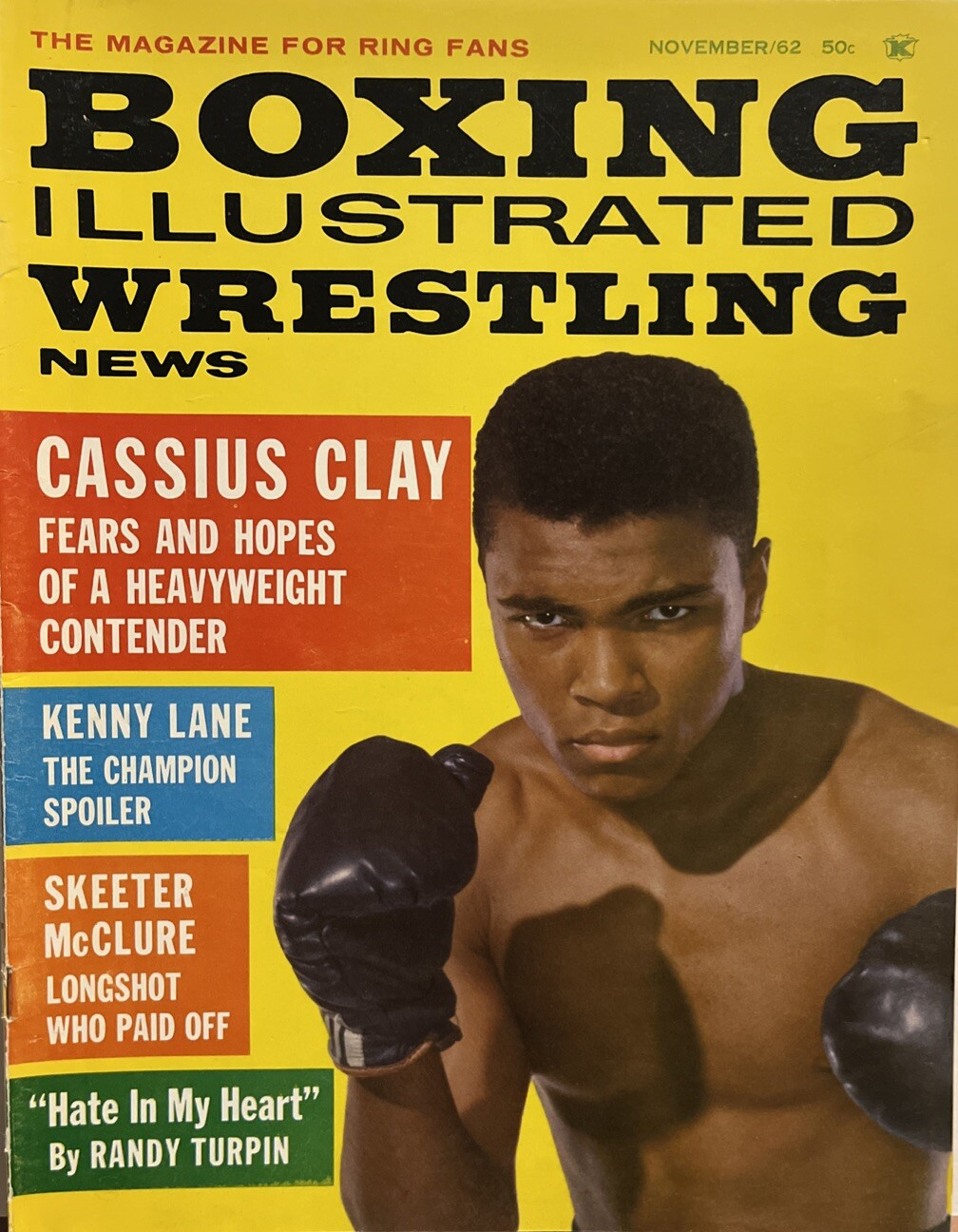
A 1962 cover of Boxing Illustrated/Wrestling News featuring Muhammad Ali

Weston launched Boxing Illustrated/Wrestling News in 1958 and published it until 1964, successfully competing with The Ring. The following year, Weston began publishing Wrestling Revue which soon became the best selling wrestling magazine in the world. At the height of its popularity, Weston sold the highly successful magazine to Bert Sugar, Lew Eskin and Norman Kietzer and then went on to publish under the company name "G.C. London Publishing", competing magazines to include The Wrestler, Inside Wrestling, Wrestling Yearbook, Wrestling Annual, Pro Wrestling Illustrated, World Boxing and Boxing International.

In 1970, Weston ensured access to wrestling's most important celebrities by hiring 25 year old wrestling enthusiast Bill Apter who cultivated friendships with the biggest stars in the business. Apter's photography, writing and interviewing skills became a mainstay in Weston's magazines for over two decades.

In 1989, fifty-two years after joining The Ring as a stock boy, Weston purchased the magazine that gave him his first job. Two years later, Weston's G.C. London Publishing had a portfolio of five boxing and nine wrestling magazines with annual sales of more than $13 million.

Despite the success of Weston's publishing empire, competition with Vincent J. McMahon's WWE during the late 1980s and early 1990s resulted in a loss of sales as McMahon curtailed outside journalists from reporting on his events. McMahon also began the process of breaking kayfabe, jeopardizing Weston's core competency: creating outrageous stories about wrestlers. Weston subsequently sold all of his publications, to include The Ring, to Kappa Publishing in 1993.

Weston also authored several of the definitive books on boxing history, including History of the Heavyweights, The Heavyweight Champions, The Best of The Ring, The Chronicle of Boxing and, with Steve Farhood, The Ring: Boxing the 20th Century.

=== Kayfabe ===
Central to the success of Weston's wrestling magazines was adhering to kayfabe: the portrayal of staged events as real. While the wrestling matches featured in Weston's magazines did occur, typically the post-match interviews and quotes from the wrestlers were fictitious.

“I specifically remember that the first time I was asked to do a wrestling article, they gave me a bunch of photos, they told me what was going on, and I said, ‘Okay, do you have the phone numbers of the wrestlers so I can get some quotes?’ And that was met with a lot of laughs, of course, because I didn’t know that you made up the quotes.” -- Steve Farhood, who covered boxing and wrestling for Weston.

Some of Weston's staff writers themselves were part of the kayfabe. Steve Farhood had a column titled "On the Road" where he staked out wrestlers, following them around the country, supposedly risking personal injury to obtain good stories. Interviewing the notoriously unpopular Ric Flair in his home state of Minnesota, at a time when Flair was in mourning over the loss of a close friend, became one of Farhood's best-known columns. Debunking Flair's reputation as one of wrestling's dirtiest characters, Farhood's column portrayed Flair as a sensitive, emotional person. Farhood later admitted that he wrote the column from the comfort of his desk, never spoke to or met Ric Flair, and completely fabricated the story about Flair losing a close friend.

=== Sports Review Wrestling ===
In 1972, Weston started a new magazine, Sports Review Wrestling, that featured "bloody covers and outlandish stories". Initially, competing with other Weston publications, the magazine sold poorly. In 1973, Weston showed Apter a set of photos taken by Los Angeles-based boxing photographer Theo Ehret. Apter was surprised that the photo set showed young, bikini-clad women in posed wrestling moves. Weston referred to the wrestling sessions as "Apartment House Wrestling" and told Apter that they would constitute a new feature in Sports Review Wrestling.

Weston's Sports Review Wrestling, featuring bloody covers and women fighting in bikinis, created a stir on the wrestling industry and caused some professional wrestlers to stop cooperating with G.C London Publishing.

By the end of the decade, knowing that adolescents represented a large share of his sales audience and in response to parental concerns, Weston had removed both Apartment House stories as well as bloody photos from the magazine's covers. Sports Review Wrestling ceased publication in July 1992. In 1995 Kappa reintroduced the magazine, formatted in a reduced size, but the new version lasted less than a year.

==== Apartment House Wrestling ====
Juxtaposing photographs of girls in bikinis fighting each other alongside photos of legitimate wrestlers such as Chief Jay Strongbow infuriated people in the wrestling industry, including Strongbow who asked Apter "What is this crap doing in a wrestling magazine? Why is my picture next to them?" Professional wrestler Gorilla Monsoon threw a copy of the magazine at Apter and said "Tell Weston this doesn't fly!" Another critic was Vince McMahon who threatened to revoke Weston's press access to wrestling events if the feature wasn't deleted from the magazine.

Despite pushback from the professional wrestling community, sales of Sports Review Wrestling soared and Weston decided to retain "apartment house wrestling" as a monthly feature, telling his staff, "We're going to make a fortune out of this, I don't care what the promoters say." Using the same kayfabe approach as professional wrestling, Dan Shocket soon became the editor responsible for crafting the apartment house wrestling storylines, typically featuring a fight between a blonde and a brunette, battling in front of a fictitious community of apartment house wrestling fans. Organizing the monthly wrestling matches for groups of wealthy businessmen who enjoyed the spectacle of women fighting, was done by "Dave Moll", described in one issue as a "millionaire playboy", and considered to be Shocket's alter ego. A blonde model named "Cynara" became one of the series most popular wrestlers. The popularity of apartment house wrestling led to a spin off magazine, Battling Girls, that exclusively featured women wrestling, often completely nude.

Ehret remained the principal photographer throughout the feature's run in Sports Review Wrestling, eventually publishing his own book Exquisite Mayhem, a photographic collection of apartment house wrestling. Apartment House Wrestling's last feature was in 1983. In recent years, back issues of the magazine that featured apartment house wrestling have become collector's items. Detractors have criticized apartment house wrestling for mixing "old-style stereotypes with the worst kind of sexism." Others have created internet sites catering to apartment house wrestling fans who remember the magazine features from their youth and appreciate them for their nostalgic value.

Using the name "Para", Nancy Benoit was one of Weston's apartment wrestlers. Her entrance to the world of apartment wrestling started with her working as a bikini-clad model, photographed by Wrestling All Stars photographer Bill Otten. She would later enter the world of professional wrestling under the names of "Fallen Angel" and "Woman" and eventually marry professional wrestler Chris Benoit. On June 22, 2007, her and her son would be murdered by Chris Benoit who took his own life, in what authorities concluded was a murder-suicide.

=== Pro Wrestling Illustrated ===
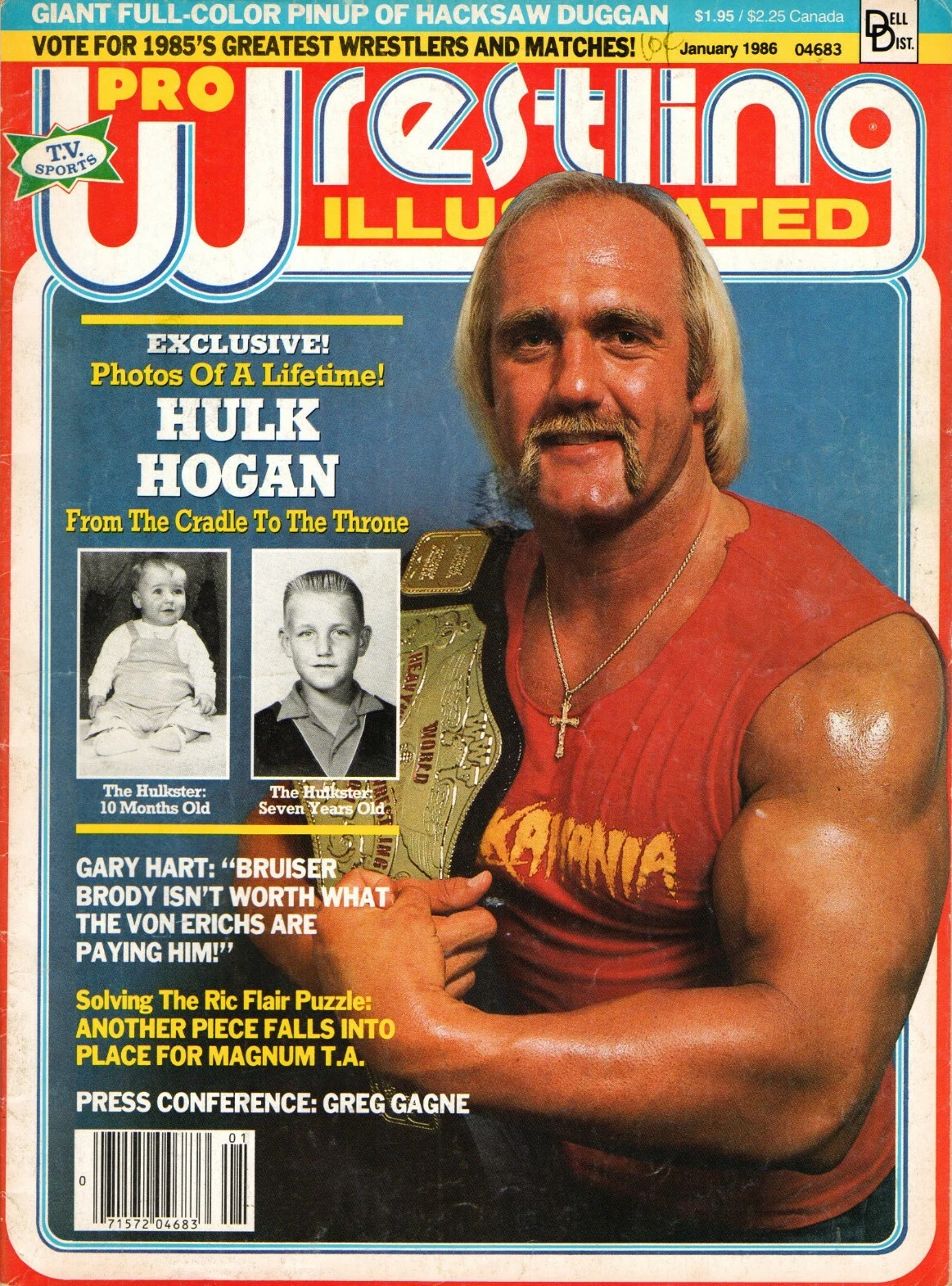
Pro Wrestling Illustrated, first published in 1979, was Weston's most successful wrestling magazine.

Weston began publishing Pro Wrestling Illustrated in 1979 and assigned Bill Apter as the magazine's senior editor and photographer. The magazine became famous for treating wrestling storylines (kayfabe) as real, as well as announcing their annual awards to the best male and female wrestlers. The awards had previously been a feature of Sports Review Wrestling but moved to PWI when Sports Review Wrestling ceased publication in 1995. Apter remained senior editor of the magazine when Weston sold PWI to the Kappa Publishing Group in 1993 and, along with other staff members, moved from the New York area to the Philadelphia suburbs where Kappa was located. During his tenure with PWI, Apter became well known to millions of wrestling fans and became so identified with PWI that many in the wrestling community referred to PWI as the "Apter mag". After more than 28 years as the senior editor, Apter resigned in 1999 and began employment as editor-in-chief at World of Wrestling (WOW), a magazine published by H&S Media Inc. As of 2023, PWI was still being published by Kappa.

== Personal life ==
Weston was married to Hope Patrick (died 1980) for 38 years. A veteran of two wars, Weston remained in the Air Force Reserves, retiring at the rank of Major in 1966.

He died on April 11, 2002, from pancreatic cancer. He was survived by two daughters, Toby Weston Cone and Barbara Harris, along with four grandchildren and five great-grandchildren.

Throughout his seven decades long career in boxing, he amassed one of the largest collections of boxing memorabilia in the world.

== Legacy and awards ==
"He loved the history of boxing and everything about boxing, but boxing didn't make the money that wrestling did. He was very attracted to Ringling Brothers ... the whole freak show aspect of it... and that ties into wrestling because of freaks like André the Giant. They were sideshows. He was an amazing storyteller, whether he was talking about a cruise he took or writing in a publication." - Toby Weston Crone, daughter.

"There was, in fact, very little about Stanley Weston that could be considered traditional. He was a writer who never read a book. He was a millionaire who drove a Ford Tempo. He was a former military officer who rarely barked orders. He was at the same time a man who watched every penny and the most generous soul I have ever met." - Stu Saks, publisher, Pro Wrestling Illustrated.

- International Boxing Hall of Fame
  - Inductee - Observer (2006)
- Pro Wrestling Illustrated
  - PWI Stanley Weston Award (1992)

== See also ==
- Catfight
- Stage combat
