= Dick Axman =

- Born: Richard Theodore Axman; February 28, 1891; Port Huron, Michigan
- Died: December 8, 1969 (aged 78); Chicago, Illinois
- Occupation(s): Promoter, editor

Dick Axman (February 28, 1891 – December 8, 1969) was a pioneer American sports publicist, sportswriter, magazine creator and magazine editor. Dick began his career in 1927, writing a column about boxing, and is most notable for his promotion of professional wrestling.

In 1946, Dick was the co-creator of the earliest wrestling publication Wrestling As You Like It, and he was the editor from 1946 to 1955. From 1951 to 1953, Dick was the Editor of the official magazine of the National Wrestling Alliance, N.W.A. Official Wrestling. In 1953, Dick co-founded Wrestling Stars with Jim Barnett. Dick Axman was the lead publicist for the promotional push of 1961 which resulted in record-breaking $125,000 ticket sales on June 30, 1961, for the Roger–O'Connor N.W.A. Heavyweight Championship fight at Comiskey Park—the first time ticket sales for a single match had exceeded $100,000.
