= Night of Champions (2010) =

World Wrestling Entertainment pay-per-view event

- Promotional poster featuring Kane holding the World Heavyweight Championship
- Promotion: World Wrestling Entertainment
- Brand(s): Raw; SmackDown
- Date: September 19, 2010
- City: Rosemont, Illinois
- Venue: Allstate Arena
- Attendance: 13,851
- Buy rate: 165,000

Pay-per-view chronology
← Previous; SummerSlam	Next → Hell in a Cell

Night of Champions chronology
← Previous; 2009	Next → 2011

The 2010 Night of Champions was a professional wrestling pay-per-view (PPV) event produced by World Wrestling Entertainment (WWE). It was the fourth annual Night of Champions and took place on September 19, 2010, at the Allstate Arena in the Chicago suburb of Rosemont, Illinois, held for wrestlers from the promotion's Raw and SmackDown brand divisions. The theme of the event was that all seven of WWE's active championships at the time were defended.

Seven matches took place at the event. There were two main events: one from Raw and one from SmackDown. In the Raw main event, which was the final match, Randy Orton defeated defending champion Sheamus, John Cena, Wade Barrett, Chris Jericho, and Edge in a six-man elimination challenge match to win the WWE Championship, while in the SmackDown main event, Kane defeated The Undertaker in a No Holds Barred match to retain the World Heavyweight Championship. Other prominent matches included Dolph Ziggler retaining SmackDown's Intercontinental Championship against Kofi Kingston, Daniel Bryan defeating The Miz to win Raw's United States Championship, and Michelle McCool, wrestling on behalf of SmackDown's Women's Champion Layla, defeating Raw's Divas Champion Melina in a Lumberjill match to unify the titles; this was the final Women's Championship match ever contested in the history of the championship as it was retired immediately after the event. In the only non-title match on the card, Big Show defeated CM Punk.

The event had 165,000 pay-per-view buys, down on the 2009 figure of 267,000 buys. This was the final Night of Champions held during the first brand split, which ended in August 2011, but was reinstated in July 2016. It was also the first Night of Champions to feature a non-title match, as the cards for the previous three events were entirely title matches.

== Production ==
=== Background ===
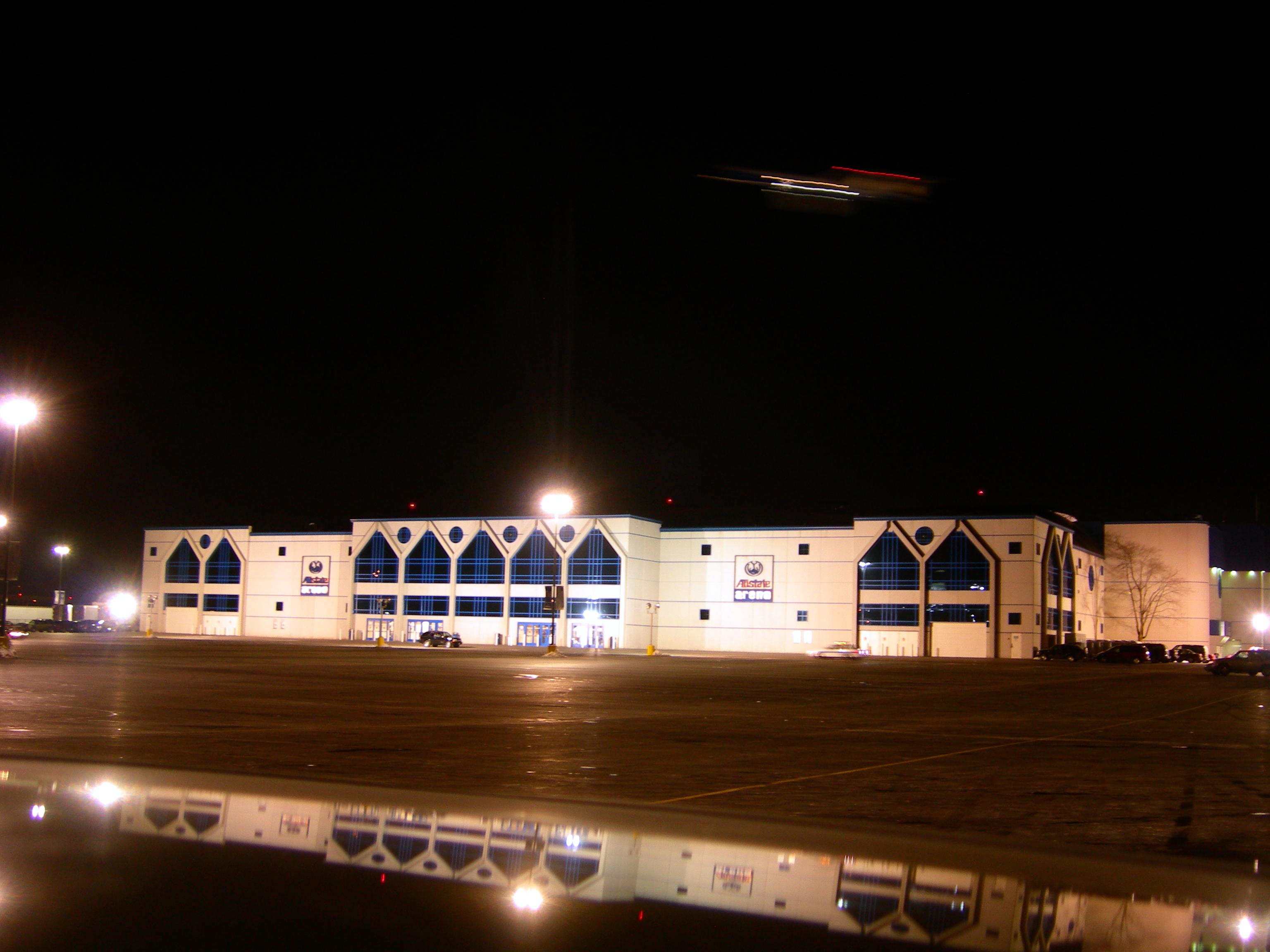
The fourth annual Night of Champions was held at the Allstate Arena in Rosemont, Illinois.

Night of Champions is a professional wrestling pay-per-view (PPV) event produced by World Wrestling Entertainment (WWE) since 2007, with the event based around championship matches. The fourth event was held on September 19, 2010, at the Allstate Arena in the Chicago suburb of Rosemont, Illinois and featured wrestlers from the Raw and SmackDown brand divisions. Tickets went on sale on July 24 via Ticketmaster.

As per the theme of the event, every active championship promoted by WWE at the time was defended. These included the three championships on Raw—the WWE Championship, the United States Championship, and the WWE Divas Championship—the three championships on SmackDown—the World Heavyweight Championship, the Intercontinental Championship, and the WWE Women's Championship—and the promotion's sole tag team championship—the WWE Tag Team Championship, which was available to both brands.

=== Storylines ===
Night of Champions featured professional wrestling matches involving different wrestlers from pre-existing scripted feuds, plots, and storylines that played out on WWE's television programs, Raw and SmackDown.

The main rivalry heading into Night of Champions from the Raw brand featured the defending champion Sheamus, Randy Orton, John Cena, Chris Jericho, Edge, and Wade Barrett, feuding over the WWE Championship. At Fatal 4-Way in June, Sheamus won his second WWE Championship in a fatal four-way match against Cena, Edge and Orton after interference from The Nexus and, at Money in the Bank in July, defeated Cena to retain the title in a Steel Cage match, again after The Nexus interfered. At SummerSlam, Sheamus defended the championship against Orton and lost via disqualification, but as per WWE rules, retained the title. On the August 23 episode of Raw, the Anonymous Raw General Manager set up a series of matches that night to determine the next contender for the WWE Championship, and allowed Sheamus himself to handpick his opponent for Night of Champions. The matches saw Edge defeat R-Truth, Jericho defeat The Great Khali, and Orton defeat John Morrison and Ted DiBiase in a triple threat match, while The Miz defeated Cena via disqualification. During the night, Barrett called off The Nexus' "truce" with Sheamus, and at the end of night, decided to cash-in his right (due to winning the first season of NXT) to challenge for the WWE Championship at Night of Champions. However, the general manager announced that Sheamus was to defend his WWE Championship against Orton, Cena, Jericho, Edge, and Barrett in a six-pack challenge at Night of Champions. On the 900th episode of Raw, Chris Jericho added a stipulation that if he did not win the championship, he would leave WWE. However, the following week, he wrestled in a match with John Morrison under the stipulation that he would be taken out of the Night of Champions match if he did not win. Jericho lost the match and was removed from the six-pack challenge. On the September 13 episode of Raw, the anonymous Raw general manager announced the match was changed to an elimination format. In addition, the general manager also offered Jericho an opportunity to re-insert himself in the match via a handicap steel cage match against The Hart Dynasty (David Hart Smith and Tyson Kidd). Jericho was successful in defeating the duo and thus was re-admitted to the six-pack challenge.

The main rivalry from the SmackDown brand featured the champion Kane against his storyline half-brother The Undertaker for the World Heavyweight Championship. Approximately three months prior, The Undertaker had been mysteriously put in a vegetative state. Upon finding out about this, Kane had attempted to seek vengeance against the culprit. At the Money in the Bank pay-per-view, Kane had won the Money in the Bank ladder match and cashed in his contract later that night against then champion Rey Mysterio. Mysterio used his rematch clause on Kane to challenge him at SummerSlam, but failed to regain the title. During the weeks leading up to SummerSlam, Kane was convinced that Mysterio was the one behind the attack on his brother and upon defeating him, attempted to put him in a casket when The Undertaker appeared inside it. Upon seeing his brother again, Kane attacked The Undertaker, turning him heel. On the September 3 episode of SmackDown, Kane challenged The Undertaker, putting his championship on the line and promising to end The Undertaker for good. Then, on the September 10 episode of SmackDown, The Undertaker challenged Kane to make the title match No Holds Barred, which he agreed to a week later.

Another rivalry involved an inter-brand match involving Raw's Divas Champion Melina and SmackDown's WWE Women's Champion Layla and Michelle McCool, collectively known as Lay-Cool, in a championship unification match. On May 14, Layla had pinned Beth Phoenix in a handicap match to win the Women's Championship. However, both Layla and McCool decided to make themselves Co-Women's Champion (as, by their logic, the Championship was won in a handicap match), going as far as splitting the main championship belt to keep co-reign. At SummerSlam, Melina had won the Divas Championship from Alicia Fox. After the match, Lay-Cool attacked Melina, stating they had defeated everyone on the SmackDown brand while champions and decided to go after the Divas on Raw. On the 900th episode of Raw, LayCool challenged Melina to a title unification match at Night of Champions. Melina accepted under one condition, their match would be a lumberjill match.

Another rivalry from Raw involved champion The Miz against Daniel Bryan for the WWE United States Championship. The feud had begun during the first season of NXT, when The Miz was Bryan's storyline mentor, and felt that Bryan did not respect him. Bryan had been released from WWE in June for strangling Justin Roberts with his necktie, but returned at SummerSlam to join Team WWE, taking The Miz's place. Afterward, the two resumed their rivalry, distracting or attacking each other during matches, with The Miz joined by his rookie from the second season of NXT, Alex Riley. On the September 6 episode of Raw, Bryan challenged The Miz for the United States Championship, which The Miz accepted.

Another SmackDown rivalry involved the champion Dolph Ziggler against Kofi Kingston for the WWE Intercontinental Championship. On the August 6 episode of SmackDown, Ziggler defeated Kingston for his Intercontinental Championship after his manager Vickie Guerrero distracted the referee during Kingston's pinfall on Ziggler. Kingston got a rematch at SummerSlam only for The Nexus to interfere resulting in a no contest. Following this, Kingston got several rematches against Ziggler, only to be disqualified for one of them and counted out for another. To correct this, General Manager Theodore Long declared that Ziggler would defend his title against Kingston and if he were to be disqualified or counted out, then the title would go to Kingston.

== Event ==
Other on-screen personnel
Role:	Name:
English commentators	Michael Cole
English commentators	Jerry Lawler
English commentators	Matt Striker
Spanish commentators	Carlos Cabrera
Spanish commentators	Hugo Savinovich
Ring announcers	Tony Chimel
Ring announcers	Justin Roberts
Backstage interviewer	Josh Mathews
Referees	John Cone
Referees	Mike Chioda
Referees	Justin King

=== Preliminary matches ===
The actual pay-per-view opened with Dolph Ziggler (accompanied by Kaitlyn and Vickie Guerrero) defending the Intercontinental Championship against Kofi Kingston. In the end, as Kingston attempted Trouble In Paradise on Ziggler, Ziggler avoided Kingston, trapping Kingston's leg in the ropes. Ziggler executed a Zig Zag on Kingston to retain the title.

Next, Big Show faced CM Punk. In the end, as Punk attempted a Springboard Clothesline on Big Show, Big Show delivered a Spear in mid-air and executed a KO Punch on Punk to win the match.

After that, The Miz defended the United States Championship against Daniel Bryan. Bryan forced Miz to submit to the Lebell Lock to win the title.

In the fourth match, Women's Champion Michelle McCool faced Divas Champion Melina in a Winner Takes All Lumberjill match to unify the titles. In the end, Layla interfered, starting a brawl involving the Lumberjills. McCool executed a Big Boot on Melina to win the match.

=== Main event matches ===
In the fifth match, Kane defended the World Heavyweight Championship against The Undertaker in a No Holds Barred match. At the start of the match, The Undertaker attacked Kane on the entrance ramp, throwing Kane into a pillar on the entrance ramp. After brawling inside the ring, Kane threw the broadcast table cover at The Undertaker. The Undertaker performed a Clothesline on Kane, knocking Kane over the barricade into the timekeeper's area, and leapt over the barricade onto Kane. In the end, The Undertaker delivered a Chokeslam to Kane for a near-fall. The Undertaker attempted a Tombstone Piledriver on Kane but Kane countered into his own Tombstone Piledriver on The Undertaker to retain the title.

Later, a Tag Team Turmoil match for the WWE Tag Team Championship took place. Defending champions The Hart Dynasty (David Hart Smith and Tyson Kidd) and The Usos (Jey Uso and Jimmy Uso) began the match. The Hart Dynasty were eliminated after Kidd was pinned by Jey following a Superkick. Santino Marella and Vladimir Kozlov entered next. Santino and Kozlov were eliminated after Jimmy pinned Marella following a Samoan Drop. Evan Bourne and Mark Henry entered fourth. The Usos were eliminated after Bourne pinned Jimmy following an Air Bourne. Cody Rhodes and Drew McIntyre entered last. Rhodes performed a Cross Rhodes on Bourne to win the titles.

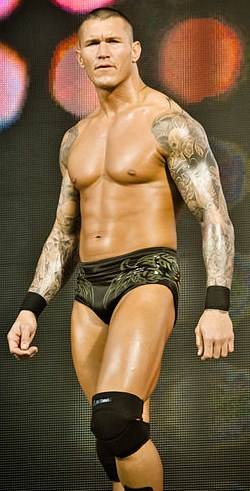
Randy Orton at Tribute to the Troops in 2010.

In the main event, Sheamus defended the WWE Championship against Wade Barrett, Randy Orton, John Cena, Edge, and Chris Jericho in a six-pack challenge elimination match. Orton eliminated Jericho after an RKO. Cena eliminated Edge after an Attitude Adjustment. After interference by The Nexus, Barrett eliminated Cena after a Wasteland. The Nexus attacked Orton but Cena used a chair to attack The Nexus. Orton eliminated Barrett after an RKO. Sheamus executed a Brogue Kick on Orton for a near-fall. As Sheamus attempted a High Cross on Orton, Orton countered and pinned Sheamus after an RKO to win the title.

== Reception ==
A sellout crowd of 13,851 people attended Night of Champions live at the venue. John Canton from TJR Wrestling praised the six-Pack Elimination Challenge for the WWE Championship calling it the best match from the event.

== Aftermath ==
This was WWE's final event to feature the original WWE Women's Championship, as at this event, it was unified with the Divas Championship, which briefly became known as the Unified WWE Divas Championship. The Women's Championship was retired with Layla recognized as the final champion while the Divas Championship became available to both brands. This would also be the final Night of Champions held during the first brand split, which ended in August 2011, just prior to the 2011 event, but it was reinstated in July 2016. Also in April 2011, the promotion ceased using its full name of World Wrestling Entertainment with the "WWE" name becoming an orphaned initialism.

=== Raw ===
Chris Jericho wrestled in a match against WWE Champion Randy Orton on the September 27 episode of Raw, where Orton performed a Punt Kick on Jericho, leading to an injury which he was written off on television for the next year. He would return to the company on the January 2, 2012, episode, where he declared his entry at the Royal Rumble, where he was eliminated by Sheamus.

On the following episode of Raw, Sheamus invoked his rematch clause for Randy Orton's WWE Championship, and the match was scheduled for Hell in a Cell as a Hell in a Cell match.

Also on Raw, John Cena faced Heath Slater, David Otunga, Michael Tarver, and Justin Gabriel in a gauntlet match. The ending came when The Nexus appeared as Cena was about to defeat Gabriel. Cena then grabbed a chair from Barrett, forcing The Nexus to retreat. Cena and Barrett then agreed to a match at Hell in a Cell with the stipulation that if Barrett won, Cena would be forced to join The Nexus, and if Cena won, The Nexus would be forced to disband.

The Miz gave a promo to address losing the United States Championship to Daniel Bryan, who subsequently took on Edge. In the climax, Alex Riley distracted the referee, allowing Miz to attack Bryan and cost him the match. However, due to interference, Bryan was declared the winner. Afterwards, Miz and Riley brutally attacked Bryan. The following week, Miz and Riley defeated Bryan and John Morrison. After the match, a brawl broke out, with Morrison standing tall in the end. It was then announced that Bryan would defend the United States Championship against Miz and Morrison in a triple threat submissions count anywhere match.

Due to Layla starting a brawl among the lumberjills at Night of Champions, she faced Melina for the Unified Divas Championship, but failed to win the title.

=== SmackDown ===
Following his win on the following episode of SmackDown, World Heavyweight Champion Kane challenged The Undertaker to a Hell in a Cell match at Hell in a Cell. That same episode, a returning Paul Bearer reunited with The Undertaker and restored his powers.

== Results ==
No.	Results	Stipulations	Times
1^{D}	John Morrison defeated Ted DiBiase by pinfall	Singles match	—
2	Dolph Ziggler (c) (with Kaitlyn and Vickie Guerrero) defeated Kofi Kingston by pinfall	Singles match for the WWE Intercontinental Championship; Had Ziggler been counted out or disqualified, he would have lost the title.	12:42
3	Big Show defeated CM Punk by pinfall	Singles match	4:43
4	Daniel Bryan defeated The Miz (c) (with Alex Riley) by submission	Singles match for the WWE United States Championship	12:29
5	Michelle McCool (Co-Women's Champion) defeated Melina (Divas Champion) by pinfall	Lumberjill match to unify the WWE Women's Championship and the WWE Divas Championship	6:34
6	Kane (c) defeated The Undertaker by pinfall	No Holds Barred match for the World Heavyweight Championship	18:29
7	"Dashing" Cody Rhodes and Drew McIntyre won by last eliminating Evan Bourne and Mark Henry	Tag Team Turmoil match for the WWE Tag Team Championship	11:42
8	Randy Orton defeated Sheamus (c), Wade Barrett, John Cena, Edge, and Chris Jericho	Six-Pack Elimination Challenge for the WWE Championship Since Jericho did not win the title he would leave WWE.	21:28
(c) / – the champion(s) heading into the match; D / – this was a dark match

- The lumberjills were: Alicia Fox, Brie Bella, Eve Torres, Gail Kim, Jillian Hall, Kelly Kelly, Layla, Maryse, Natalya, Nikki Bella, Rosa Mendes, and Tamina.

=== Tag Team Turmoil match ===
Order	Wrestler	Elimination	Eliminated by
1	The Hart Dynasty (Tyson Kidd and David Hart Smith) (c)	1	The Usos
2	The Usos (Jey Uso and Jimmy Uso) (with Tamina)	3	Evan Bourne and Mark Henry
3	Santino Marella and Vladimir Kozlov	2	The Usos
4	Evan Bourne and Mark Henry	4	Cody Rhodes and Drew McIntyre
5	Cody Rhodes and Drew McIntyre	Winners	N/A

=== Elimination Six-pack challenge ===
Elimination	Wrestler	Eliminated by	Elimination move	Time
1	Chris Jericho	Randy Orton	RKO	01:25
2	Edge	John Cena	Attitude Adjustment	15:00
3	John Cena	Wade Barrett	Wasteland	18:58
4	Wade Barrett	Randy Orton	RKO	20:32
5	Sheamus (c)	Randy Orton	RKO	21:28
Winner:	Randy Orton			
