= Straight Edge Society =

Professional wrestling stable

- The stable's logo

Stable
- Name: The Straight Edge Society
- Leader: CM Punk
- Members: Luke Gallows; Joey Mercury; Serena
- Debut: November 27, 2009
- Disbanded: September 3, 2010
- Years active: 2009–2010

The Straight Edge Society was a villainous professional wrestling stable in World Wrestling Entertainment (WWE) that appeared on its SmackDown brand from November 27, 2009 to September 3, 2010. The concept behind the group was the straight edge lifestyle, which promotes and abides to discipline—primarily no smoking, drinking, or drugs. The group acted as a militant organization, denouncing all people who did not live the straight edge lifestyle, even those who also abstain from substance abuse, so new members were required to shave their heads, which signified a "new beginning". The founder and leader of the group was CM Punk, who follows the straight edge lifestyle in real life. Members included Joey Mercury, Luke Gallows, and Serena. As of 2026, Punk remains employed with the WWE, while Serena Deeb is signed to All Elite Wrestling (AEW).

== History ==
=== Formation ===
Before The Straight Edge Society was formed, the heel CM Punk feuded with Jeff Hardy over the World Heavyweight Championship while making allusions to Hardy's real life drug usage. In the end, on the August 28, 2009, episode of WWE SmackDown, Punk retained his World Heavyweight Championship in a Loser Leaves WWE steel cage match and Hardy left the WWE. The formation of the stable began on the November 27 episode of SmackDown where Punk transformed the formerly mentally disabled and unresponsive Festus into the focused and driven Luke Gallows, who explained that his friends got him hooked on prescription pain medication, which explained his behavior as Festus, and he also credited Punk with cleaning him up and "showing him the way", and became Punk's main enforcer. Gallows assisted Punk in his feuds with R-Truth and Matt Hardy. A few weeks later, the two began shaving the heads of (planted) fans in the audience who wished to follow the straight edge lifestyle, demonstrating a "new beginning" for their lives. Before Punk was able to find a third person to convert, a woman named Serena came out of the crowd begging to be saved by Punk; instead of having security escort her out, he accepted Serena and shaved her head. From thereafter, Serena accompanied Punk and ran interference in his matches.

Punk interrupted many events in an attempt to recruit members to The Straight Edge Society, starting from the Royal Rumble on January 31, 2010, where he preached while eliminating Dolph Ziggler, Evan Bourne, JTG, Beth Phoenix, and Zack Ryder; he was ultimately eliminated from the speaking platform by Triple H, whom he had tried to convert previously and who had espoused that he too avoided drugs, smoke, and alcohol but did not think it was right to be preaching like Punk was doing. On February 23, it was revealed that Punk would be mentoring Darren Young, a "South Beach Party Boy", on the first season of WWE NXT. A few weeks later, Young became fascinated with The Straight Edge Society and decided to join them, only to quickly change his mind after finding out he had to shave his head as initiation.

=== Feud with Rey Mysterio ===
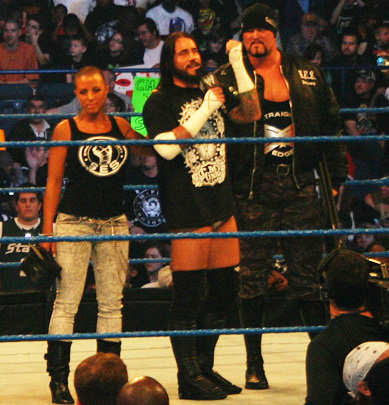
Straight Edge Society (from left to right: Serena, CM Punk, and Luke Gallows) during an episode of SmackDown in 2010

The Straight Edge Society began a feud with Rey Mysterio at the Elimination Chamber pay-per-view event on February 21, where CM Punk was eliminated by Mysterio in an Elimination Chamber match for the World Heavyweight Championship. The feud then intensifed on the February 26 episode of SmackDown when Mysterio cost Punk a qualifying match against Shelton Benjamin the Money in the Bank ladder match at WrestleMania XXVI. The Straight Edge Society then interrupted Mysterio's daughter's ninth birthday party, enticing Mysterio into challenging Punk to a match at WrestleMania XXVI, where if Mysterio lost, he would have to join The Straight Edge Society. At the event on March 28, Punk was defeated by Mysterio.

A rematch was made at Extreme Rules on April 25 where Mysterio said if Punk lost, he would have his head shaved; however, Punk won the match with interference from a mysterious fourth member who concealed himself either with a hood or a mask, thus Punk kept his head from being shaved. On the following episode of SmackDown, after getting assaulted by Mysterio during a match with Luke Gallows against Montel Vontavious Porter, the two agreed to face each other at Over the Limit on May 23 in a match that combined the stipulations of their previous two pay-per-view matches. At Over the Limit, Punk was defeated by Mysterio and ended up getting his head shaved after interference from Kane. To conceal his baldness, Punk then began to wear a mask.

Punk participated in a fatal four-way match at the Fatal 4-Way pay-per-view event on June 20 for Jack Swagger's World Heavyweight Championship that also featured eventual winner Rey Mysterio and Big Show. Near the end of the match, Kane interfered and took Punk from the ring, allegedly accusing him of injuring The Undertaker, causing Punk to lose the match and not win the title. On the June 25 episode of SmackDown, Punk faced Kane in a no disqualification match, where Punk legit injured his arm and left the building, resulting in a no contest. After an ultimatum was set by Kane to show Punk's innocence concerning a recent attack on The Undertaker, Serena showed security camera footage of herself breaking edge by drinking at a bar with an unknown man on the same night The Undertaker had been attacked, only for the other Straight Edge Society members to arrive on the scene and angrily trash the place. Despite facing expulsion from The Straight Edge Society, Serena was forgiven by Punk after she told him she showed the video to protect him from Kane, promising to never break the code again.

=== Feud with Big Show, split, and aftermath ===
The following week on SmackDown, CM Punk got into a verbal altercation with Big Show with regards to the upcoming Money in the Bank pay-per-view and a ladder custom made for Big Show; retaliating against an attack from The Straight Edge Society, Big Show chased Punk up the ladder and pulled his mask off, revealing his bald head. On the July 23 episode of SmackDown, after the "mystery man" wrestled and lost to Big Show, the mystery man's mask was then pulled off, revealing him to be Joey Mercury. The next week on SmackDown, Punk berated the three other members, stating that they are nothing without him; this changed after Gallows lost to Big Show later in the night by disqualification after all four members of The Straight Edge Society attacked Big Show and crushed his hand repeatedly on the steel steps, with Punk revealing that his arm had healed. Big Show then challenged all three members of The Straight Edge Society in a 3-on-1 handicap match at SummerSlam, which Big Show won. On the following episode of SmackDown, Serena and Gallows competed in a tag team match against Big Show and Kelly Kelly, which they won; if Gallows and Serena had lost, they would be kicked out of The Straight Edge Society.

On the August 27 episode of SmackDown, after defeating JTG, Punk ordered The Straight Edge Society to assault Big Show during his match with Gallows. Big Show defeated Gallows, showing signs of discontinuity in the Straight Edge Society. Later on in the night, WWE.com announced that Serena was released from her contract, severing her ties to The Straight Edge Society. On the September 3 episode of SmackDown, after losing a handicap match to Big Show, a visibly frustrated Punk executed a Go to Sleep to Gallows and left the ring. On the September 24 episode of SmackDown, Gallows confronted Punk by saying that after defeating him later in the night, he would celebrate by having a beer; Punk went on to win the match and Gallows was released from the company shortly thereafter, fully disbanding The Straight Edge Society. Punk moved to Raw months later and assumed leadership of The Nexus, which was then renamed to The New Nexus in 2011.

== Members ==
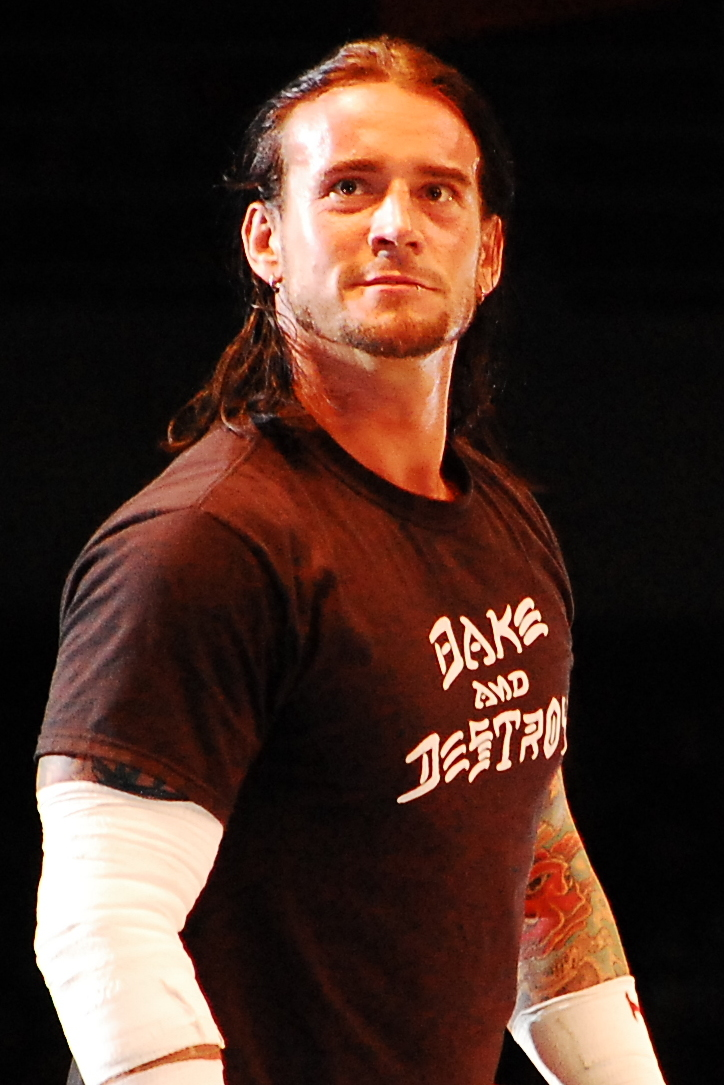
CM Punk

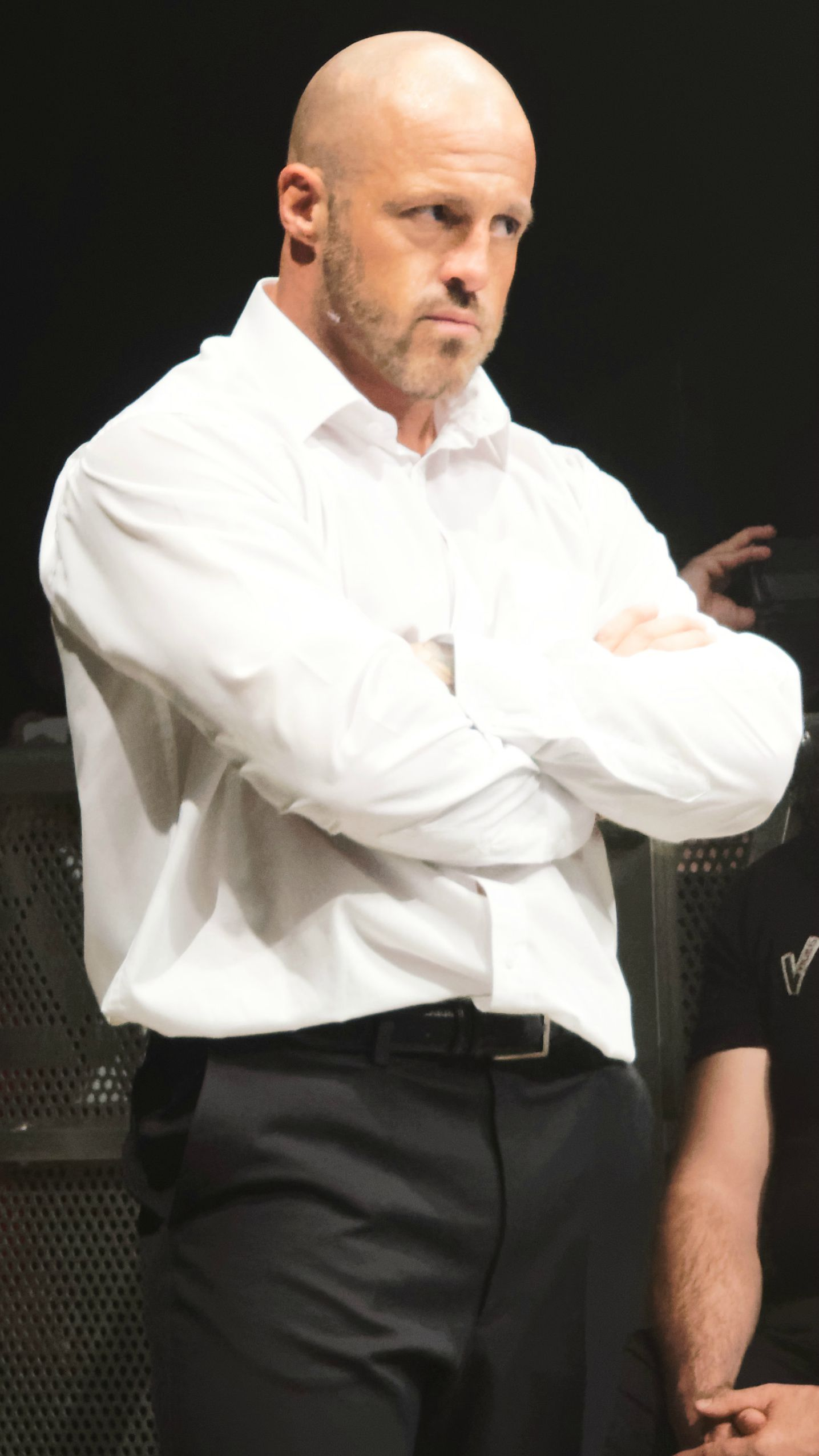
Joey Mercury

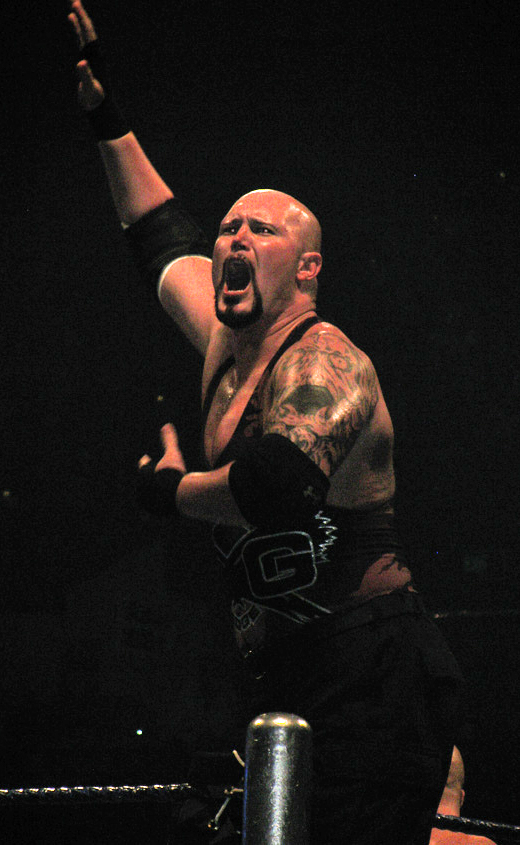
Luke Gallows

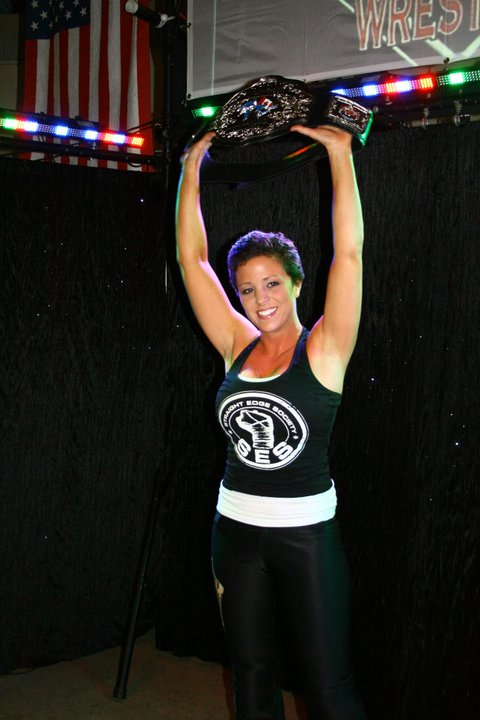
Serena

*	Founding member(s)
L	Leader
M	Manager

Members	Joined	Left
CM Punk (L)	November 27, 2009*	September 3, 2010
Luke Gallows	November 27, 2009*	September 3, 2010
Serena (M)	January 22, 2010	August 27, 2010
Joey Mercury	July 23, 2010	September 3, 2010
