= The Nexus (professional wrestling) =

Professional wrestling stable

Stable
- Leader(s): Wade Barrett (first leader); CM Punk (second leader)
- Members: See below
- Name(s): The Nexus; The New Nexus; The Nexus Alliance
- Debut: June 7, 2010 (The Nexus); January 3, 2011 (The New Nexus)
- Disbanded: August 22, 2011
- Years active: 2010–2011; 2018

The Nexus, later known as The New Nexus, was a villainous professional wrestling stable in WWE that competed on the Raw brand from June 7, 2010, to August 22, 2011, originally consisting of eight rookies who had performed on the first season of WWE NXT. The original group leader was Wade Barrett, while CM Punk was its second and final leader. The rest of the group's roster shifted several times throughout its 14-month existence, with David Otunga the only member to serve in the group from beginning to end.

The NXT graduates set out to antagonize the Raw roster, initially focusing on then WWE Champion John Cena, who forcibly became a member of The Nexus after losing a match at Hell in a Cell thanks to outside interference. Cena was eventually removed from the group at Survivor Series after Barrett lost his WWE Championship match to Randy Orton. Barrett was replaced as leader by Punk, at which point the stable was renamed The New Nexus in an attempt to distance itself from its past, becoming a tight-knit group dedicated to one another through faith. Members of the group won the WWE Tag Team Championship three times, while Punk won the WWE Championship in his final match with the stable at Money in the Bank.

== Concept ==
On the February 2, 2010, edition of WWE ECW, WWE Chairman Vince McMahon announced that NXT would replace ECW on Syfy when the latter ended its run on February 16, describing NXT as "the next evolution of WWE television history". The concept of the stable was derived from each original member of them being a contestant on the first season of the NXT program, which composed at the time of the talent from Florida Championship Wrestling, the then WWE's developmental territory. The series ran them through a competition to become WWE's next breakout star with the help of mentors from the WWE brands of Raw and SmackDown. On the June 1, 2010, edition of NXT, Barrett was declared the winner over Otunga and as a result was awarded a WWE contract and a championship match at a WWE pay-per-view of his choosing (he ultimately chose Night of Champions), while the others were left without a job.

== History ==
=== World Wrestling Entertainment/WWE ===
==== Formation ====
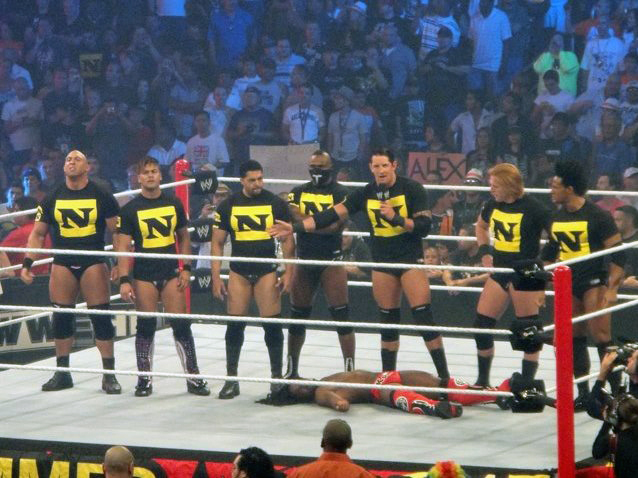
The Nexus at SummerSlam

The group made its debut during the main event of the June 7, 2010, "Viewer's Choice" edition of WWE Raw, attacking John Cena, CM Punk, Luke Gallows, Jerry Lawler, Matt Striker, Justin Roberts, and other WWE personnel around the ring before ultimately destroying everything at ringside, including the ring itself and barricades, forcing the match to end in a no contest. During the attack, which ended with Cena being taken out on a stretcher, Daniel Bryan strangled Roberts with his necktie and in a sign of disrespect spit in Cena's face, the former of which led him to be released from his contract on June 11 as WWE reportedly felt those acts were too violent for the company's TV-PG programming and would have caused issues with sponsors. His absence was explained by Barrett on the June 14 edition of Raw as having felt remorse for his actions and thus kicked him out of the group.

The Nexus was established as the main heel stable on Raw, attacking several wrestlers and legends over the next several weeks, including Raw General Manager Bret Hart and Vince McMahon and fellow WWE Hall of Fame members Ricky Steamboat and Dusty Rhodes. After Hart's attack, McMahon removed him as Raw General Manager and appointed the Anonymous Raw General Manager. The general manager chose to remain anonymous for fear of being attacked like Hart was, communicating only through e-mails quoted by Michael Cole.

==== Feud with John Cena and WWE Championship pursuits ====
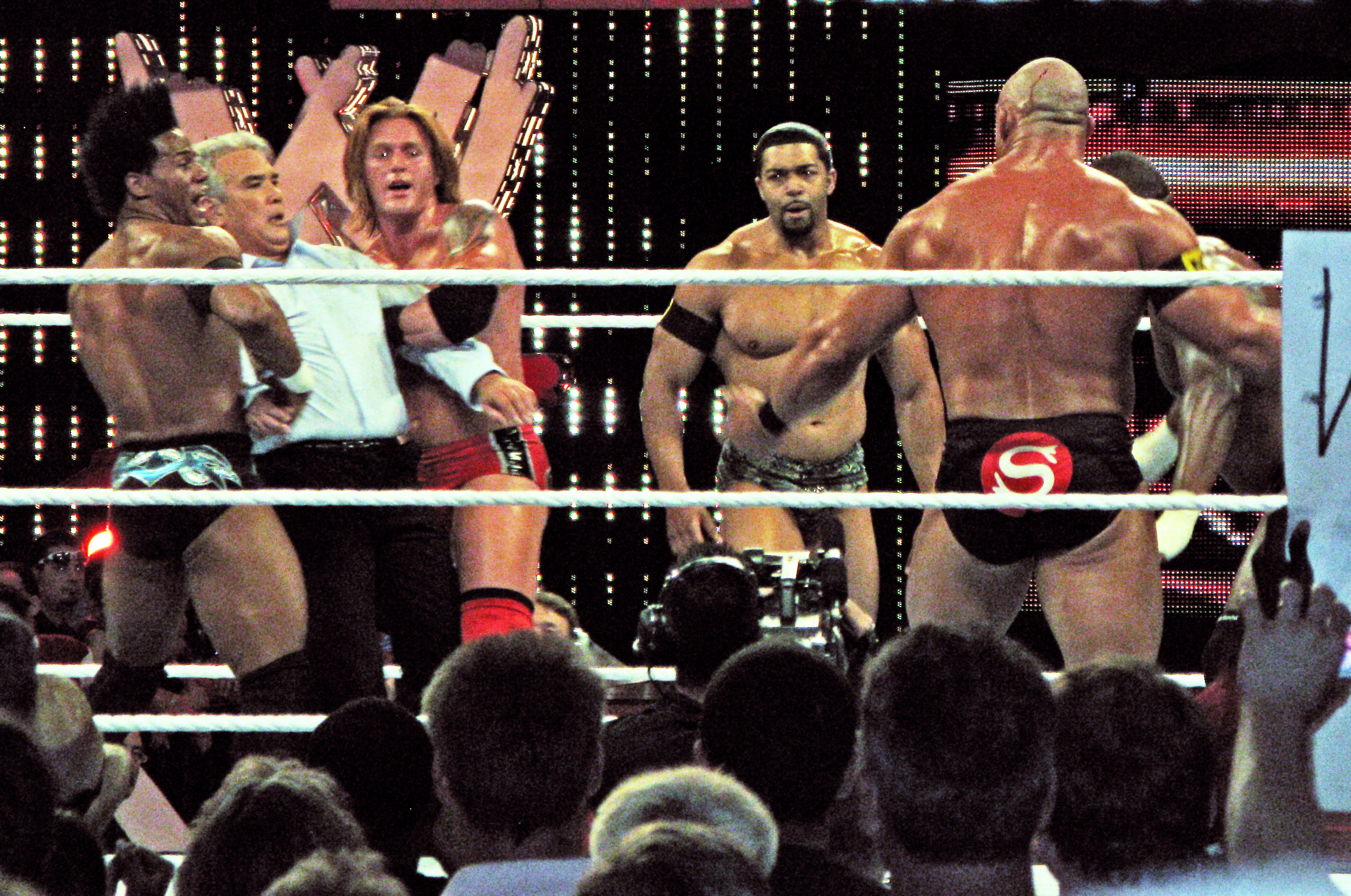
The Nexus after exiling Daniel Bryan and attacking Hall of Famer Ricky Steamboat on the June 28, 2010, edition of Raw

During the summer, The Nexus had a feud with Cena. First, on the July 12 edition of Raw, Cena was defeated in a 6-on-1 handicap match by The Nexus. On July 18 at Money in the Bank, The Nexus attempted to get involved in the WWE Championship match involving Sheamus and Cena in a steel cage; Sheamus and Cena were able to hold them off and escape, with Sheamus winning the match and retaining the WWE Championship. Their following match would take place at SummerSlam on August 15, where The Nexus faced the team of Cena, Hart, Edge, Chris Jericho, John Morrison, R-Truth, and the returning Bryan, losing after Cena submitted Barrett with the STF. According to Edge and Jericho, the original plan was to put Barrett over and establish them as legitimate threats to WWE, with Edge and Jericho being the last members of Team WWE to be eliminated by Barrett; Cena reportedly refused to lose to The Nexus and had the finish changed around the time of the event. Young and Heath Slater later stated that they agreed with Edge and Jericho, adding that The Nexus' loss at SummerSlam permanently crippled whatever momentum the stable had following the invasion.

The following night on Raw, The Nexus members competed in seven one-on-one matches against Team WWE (except Hart, who was replaced by Orton), with the stipulation that whichever member of The Nexus lost their match would be exiled from the group. Young was the only member of The Nexus who lost, as he failed to defeat Cena in the main event, leaving the group. At a WWE live event in Hawaii on August 18, Skip Sheffield broke his ankle during a tag team match, putting him out of action for the next two years, leaving The Nexus with only five active members heading into September. At Night of Champions on September 19, Barrett used his guaranteed championship match that he won for winning NXT in the six-pack elimination challenge for Sheamus' WWE Championship; he was eliminated by Orton, who later won the match and the title.

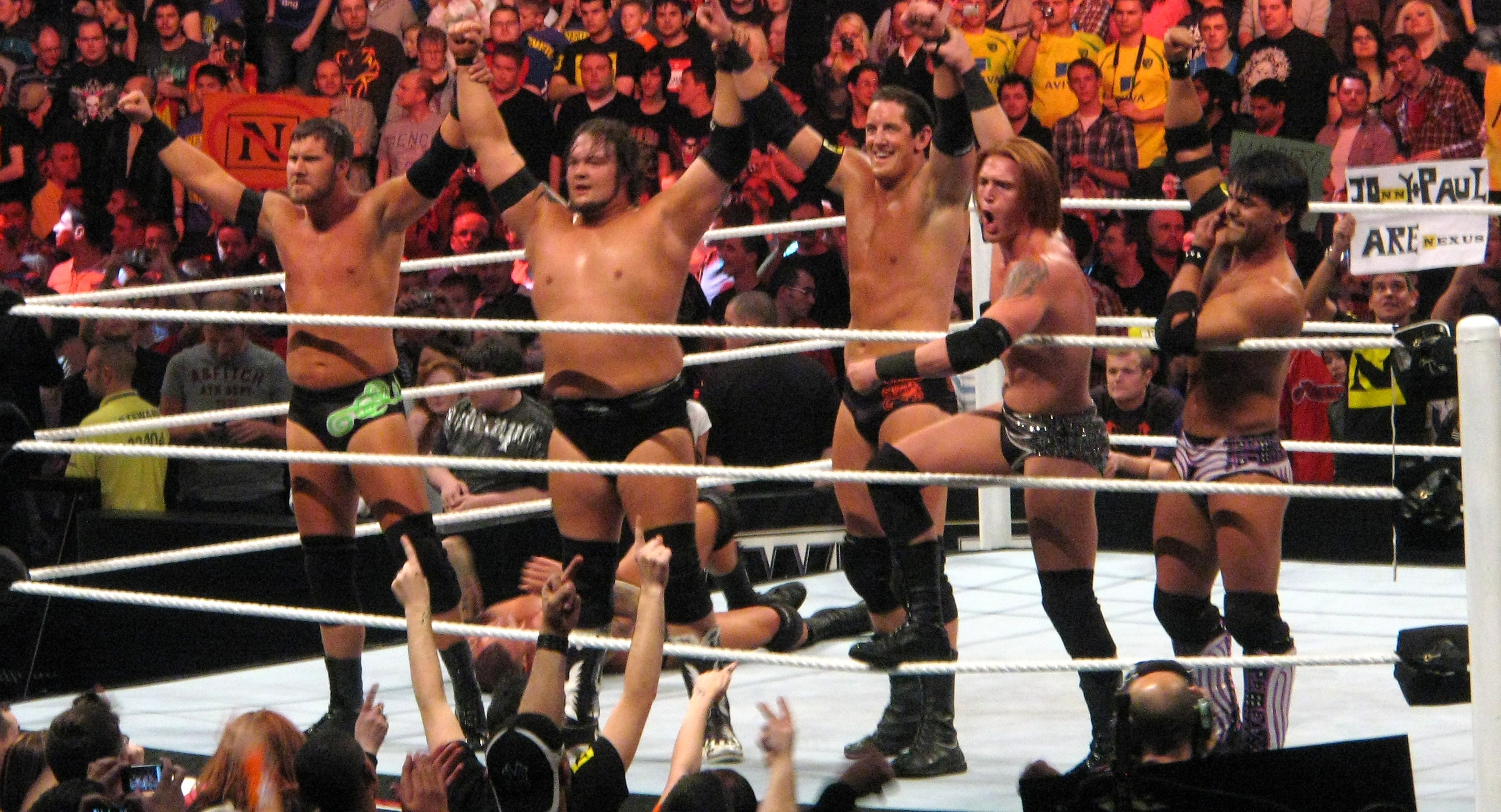
The Nexus, after losing Michael Tarver to injury and adding Husky Harris and Michael McGillicutty, on the October 25, 2010, edition of Raw

At Hell in a Cell on October 3, Barrett and Cena faced each other in a match with the stipulation that if Barrett won, Cena would have to join The Nexus; if Cena won or any other member of The Nexus got involved, the group would be permanently disbanded. Thanks to interference from Husky Harris and Michael McGillicutty, two rookies from the second season of NXT who would later join The Nexus on the October 25 edition of Raw, Barrett managed to win the match and force Cena to join The Nexus. The following night on Raw, Cena attacked Michael Tarver following a tag team match. In the subsequent segment, Barrett stated that Cena did him a favor as he was planning on getting rid of Tarver anyway, implying that Tarver was no longer a member; in reality, Tarver had a nagging groin injury and was later released from his contract in June 2011.

The Anonymous Raw General Manager stated that Cena had to honor the stipulations of the Hell in a Cell match and take orders from Barrett or be fired. Later that night, Barrett ordered Cena to help him win the number one contender battle royal for Orton's WWE Championship at Bragging Rights on October 24. The match came down to Cena and Barrett, with Barrett winning after Cena eliminated himself. At Bragging Rights, The Nexus won their first championship in WWE when Cena and Otunga defeated The Dashing Ones (Cody Rhodes and Drew McIntyre) to win the WWE Tag Team Championship. In the main event, Barrett defeated Orton via disqualification, this time caused by Cena, who as a result was chosen by Barrett as his own special guest referee for his WWE Championship rematch against Orton at Survivor Series on November 21, declaring that unless he won the title, Cena would be fired; if Barrett defeated Orton, Cena would be relieved of all responsibilities to The Nexus.

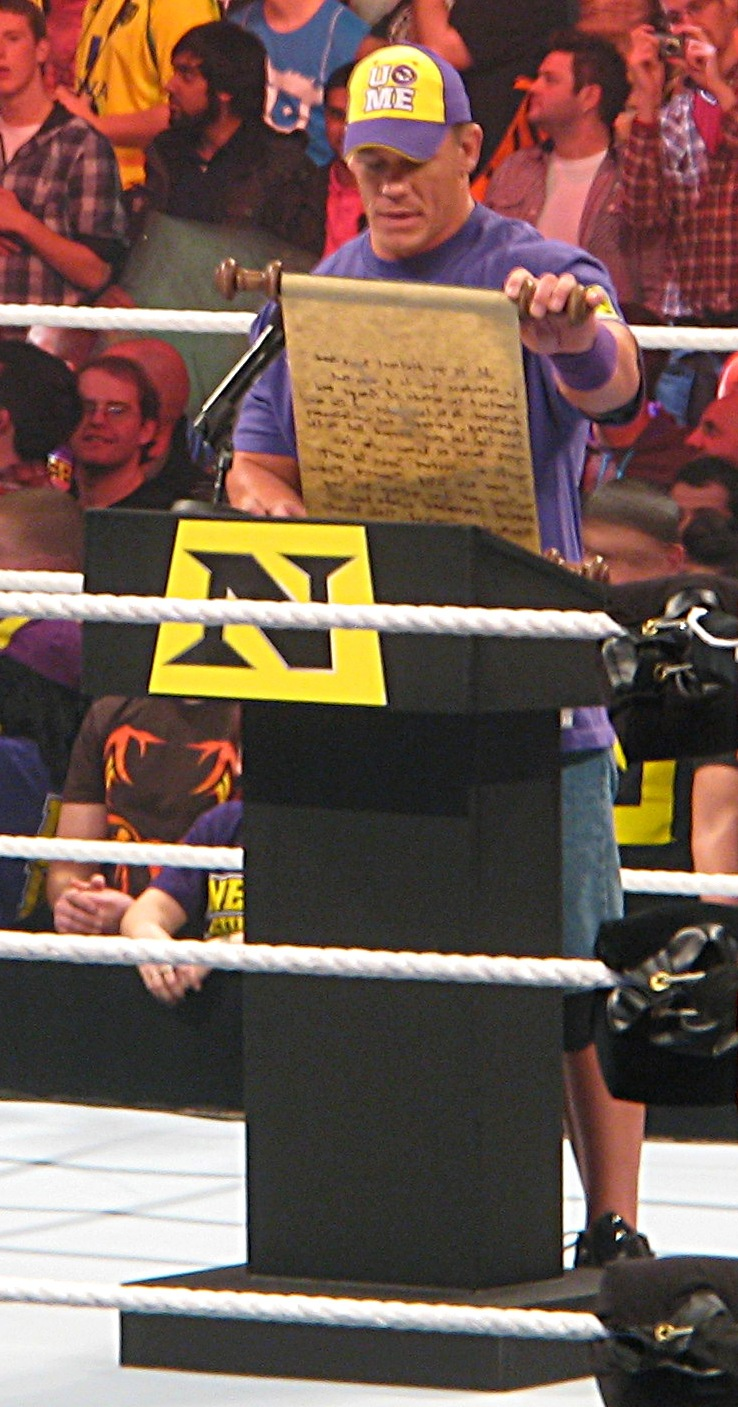
John Cena reading an address as a member of The Nexus after losing a match to Wade Barrett at Hell in a Cell

On the October 25 edition of Raw following Bragging Rights, Slater and Justin Gabriel won the WWE Tag Team Championship after Barrett ordered Otunga to allow Slater to pin him. On the November 5 edition of WWE SmackDown, Otunga, who had been questioning Barrett's leadership over the past several weeks ever since Barrett cost him and Cena the WWE Tag Team Championship to Slater and Gabriel, led Harris, McGillicutty, Gabriel, and Slater to a second invasion on SmackDown, interrupting a match between Edge and Alberto Del Rio; The Nexus was then defeated in the main event in a 5-on-5 tag team match by Edge, Del Rio, Big Show, Kane, and Kofi Kingston. Barrett did not approve Otunga's decision to lead The Nexus to SmackDown and as a result forced him to defend his spot in the group the following week. On the November 12 edition of SmackDown, thanks to interference from Kane, Otunga defeated Edge in a lumberjack match to keep his spot in The Nexus. At Survivor Series, Orton retained the WWE Championship against Barrett via pinfall following an RKO and Cena was fired (kayfabe) from WWE and subsequently exiled from The Nexus.

The following night on Raw, Cena gave a "farewell address" in which he urged Barrett to stop "taking shortcuts". Prior Barrett's rematch with Orton later that night, he directed The Nexus in a group attack (led by Harris) on Orton, "injuring" Orton's right knee. As a result, when Barrett was about to pin Orton in the match, Cena (who had supposedly left the building) pulled the referee out of the ring to break the count and attacked Barrett, paving the way (as The Nexus chased Cena out of the building) for Orton to retain the title via RKO. Despite being fired by Barrett, Cena continued to show up on Raw as a ticketholder in the subsequent weeks, causing interference in The Nexus' matches, including costing Slater and Gabriel the WWE Tag Team Championship to Santino Marella and Vladimir Kozlov in a fatal four-way tag team elimination match on the December 6 edition of Raw. On the December 13 edition of Raw, Barrett rehired Cena for fear of being exiled by The Nexus on the condition that Cena face Otunga in the main event and Barrett and Cena settle the score in a chairs match at TLC: Tables, Ladders & Chairs on December 19. At TLC: Tables, Ladders & Chairs, Cena defeated Barrett in the main event; after the match, Cena dropped 23 steel chairs from the stage on him after dispatching the rest of The Nexus.

==== The New Nexus ====
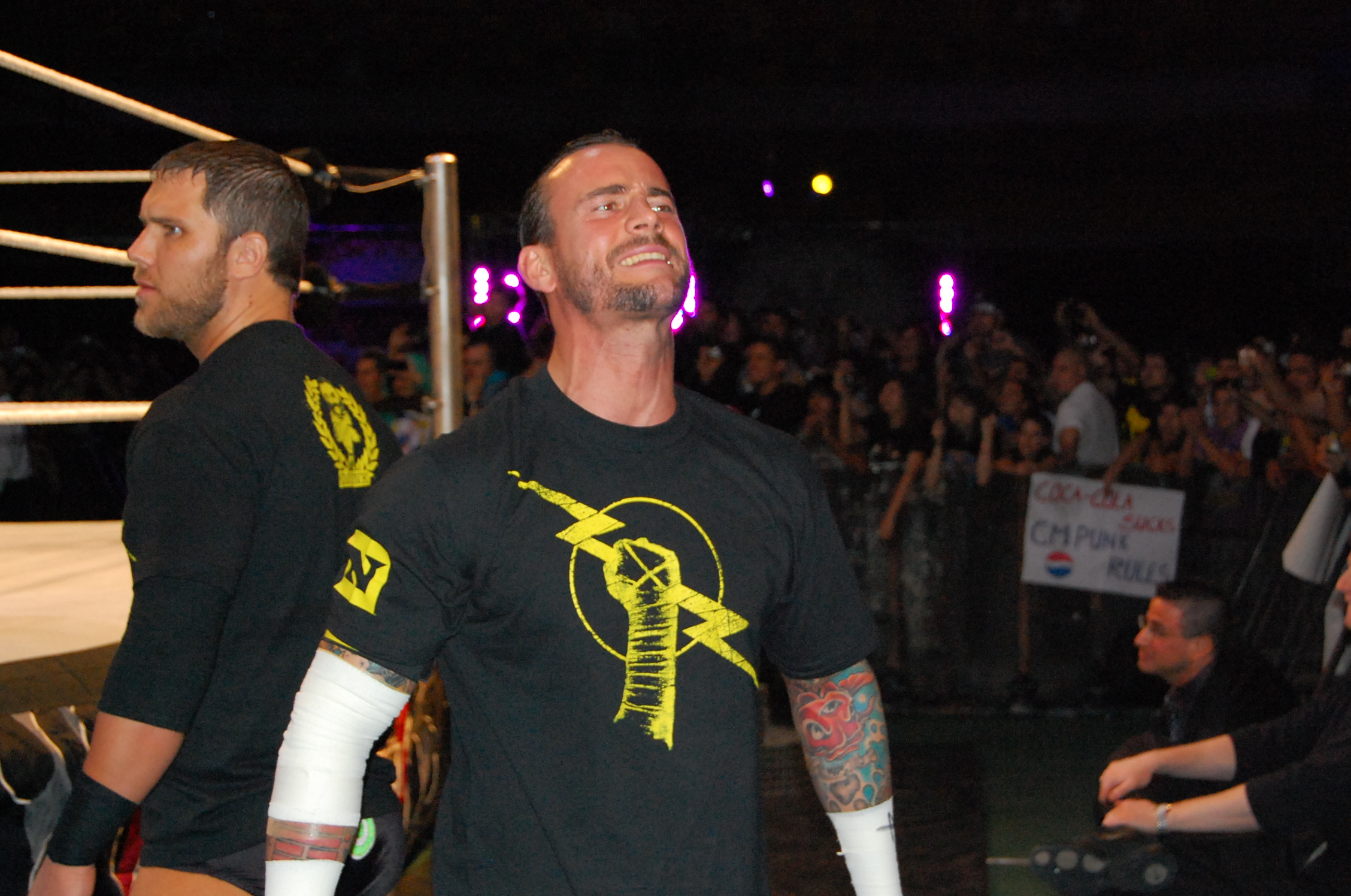
CM Punk became the stable's second leader, changing the name to The New Nexus.

On the January 3, 2011, edition of Raw, The Nexus ambiguously announced after months of repeated attacks on Cena and the WWE roster that it was under "new management", with CM Punk (who had disbanded the Straight Edge Society the previous September) being revealed to be the new leader, acquiring the position after Barrett lost a number one contendership steel cage match involving Orton and Sheamus. Punk, having agreed to fall in line had Barrett successfully won the title shot, teased helping Barrett escape the cage before knocking him off of it. Barrett was subsequently exiled from The Nexus, which would be renamed The New Nexus to distance itself from former leadership. After refusing to follow Punk's orders of initiation by hitting each other with kendo sticks, Gabriel and Slater left the group the following week on Raw, opting to join Barrett and Ezekiel Jackson (a former ECW Champion) on SmackDown as The Corre, while Harris, McGillicutty, and Otunga successfully completed Punk's initiation.

On the January 17 edition of Raw, Mason Ryan joined The New Nexus after interfering in Punk's match against John Cena, attacking both before Punk handed Ryan a Nexus armband. On January 30 at the Royal Rumble, The New Nexus, who were also a part of the 40-man Royal Rumble match along with The Corre. Most of The New Nexus members were eliminated by John Cena, ending their feud with him. Earlier that night, they would cost Orton his rematch clause for The Miz's WWE Championship, starting a feud with him. Over the ongoing weeks, Orton defeated all members of The New Nexus, causing several storyline injuries by punting them. At WrestleMania XXVII on April 3, Orton defeated Punk. At Extreme Rules on May 1, Orton defeated Punk in a rematch, this time in a Last Man Standing match.

On the May 23 edition of Raw, thanks to a distraction from The New Nexus, McGillicutty and Otunga defeated Big Show and Kane for the WWE Tag Team Championship. On the June 20 "Power to the People" edition of Raw, Punk was originally going to be named the number one contender for Cena's WWE Championship; instead, he was forced to compete in a triple threat match with Alberto Del Rio and Rey Mysterio with a Falls Count Anywhere stipulation voted for by fans that Punk won, revealing after the match that his WWE contract would expire at Money in the Bank, where he would face Cena for the WWE Championship. The following week on Raw, it was announced that Ryan suffered an injury over the weekend and left the group. That same night, a brash Punk realized a worked shoot promo, which he dubbed a "pipe bomb", reminding that once his contract expired at Money in the Bank, it would be the last time WWE would ever see him and the WWE Championship, as he considered taking his talents to another wrestling promotion, explicitily citing Ring of Honor and New Japan Pro-Wrestling as examples. With his victory over Cena at Money in the Bank, the WWE Championship was finally held by the stable on their last night of existence. Otunga and McGillicutty worked as a tag team with the New Nexus banner until August 1, and continued without the banner until August 22, when the group disbanded after they lost the WWE Tag Team Championship to Kofi Kingston and Evan Bourne.

=== Independent circuit and cancelled WWE return ===
In April 2018, The Nexus reunited on Chikara for the King of Trios tournament as The Nexus Alliance, being represented by Tyrone Evans (Tarver), Fred Rosser (Young), and Black (Gabriel).

In July 2020, Young stated that The Nexus were originally booked to return at WrestleMania 36. A year later, a documentary about The Nexus was cancelled with Young theorizing it was due to Bryan leaving WWE.

== Reception and legacy ==
Reflecting on the group, Wade Barrett discussed the group in the interview with Even Stronger podcast in September 2023. Barrett went on to state that in his own words:

"I think there was probably an era from about 2002 until about [20]09–2010 where I think the show got stale because it was the same seven or eight top guys at the time who had been running the show for the duration of that. So I think the company was starting to realise, 'Look, some of these guys that we've had holding this down for years now, they're starting to get aged out. We really, really need fresh stars because the next 10 years are not looking good unless we start building them now.' So I was kind of lucky that I was along that wave. Sheamus is another one who separately came up around that time, Drew McIntyre. We all got hired on the same day. We're pretty close. So I contrast and compare myself with those two regularly but we got caught up in this wave of 'Look we need new talent. We need new guys. We need fresh stars.' So I was fortunate that my rise through the developmental ranks came at that time, which meant the company was actively looking for new stars."

As observed by Barrett, the success of The Nexus helped show the WWE its way to debut a dominant young group and would eventually pave way for a bigger successful faction, The Shield, which consisted of Seth Rollins, Roman Reigns, and Dean Ambrose.

== Members ==
*	Founding member
I-II	Leader(s)

Member		Joined	Left
Daniel Bryan	*	June 7, 2010	
Darren Young	*	June 7, 2010	August 16, 2010
David Otunga	*	June 7, 2010	August 1, 2011
Heath Slater	*	June 7, 2010	January 10, 2011
Justin Gabriel	*	June 7, 2010	January 10, 2011
Michael Tarver	*	June 7, 2010	October 4, 2010
Skip Sheffield	*	June 7, 2010	August 18, 2010
Wade Barrett	*I	June 7, 2010	January 3, 2011
John Cena		October 3, 2010	November 21, 2010
Husky Harris		October 25, 2010	January 31, 2011
Michael McGillicutty		October 25, 2010	August 1, 2011
CM Punk	II	December 27, 2010	July 17, 2011
Mason Ryan		January 17, 2011	June 26, 2011

== Championships and accomplishments ==
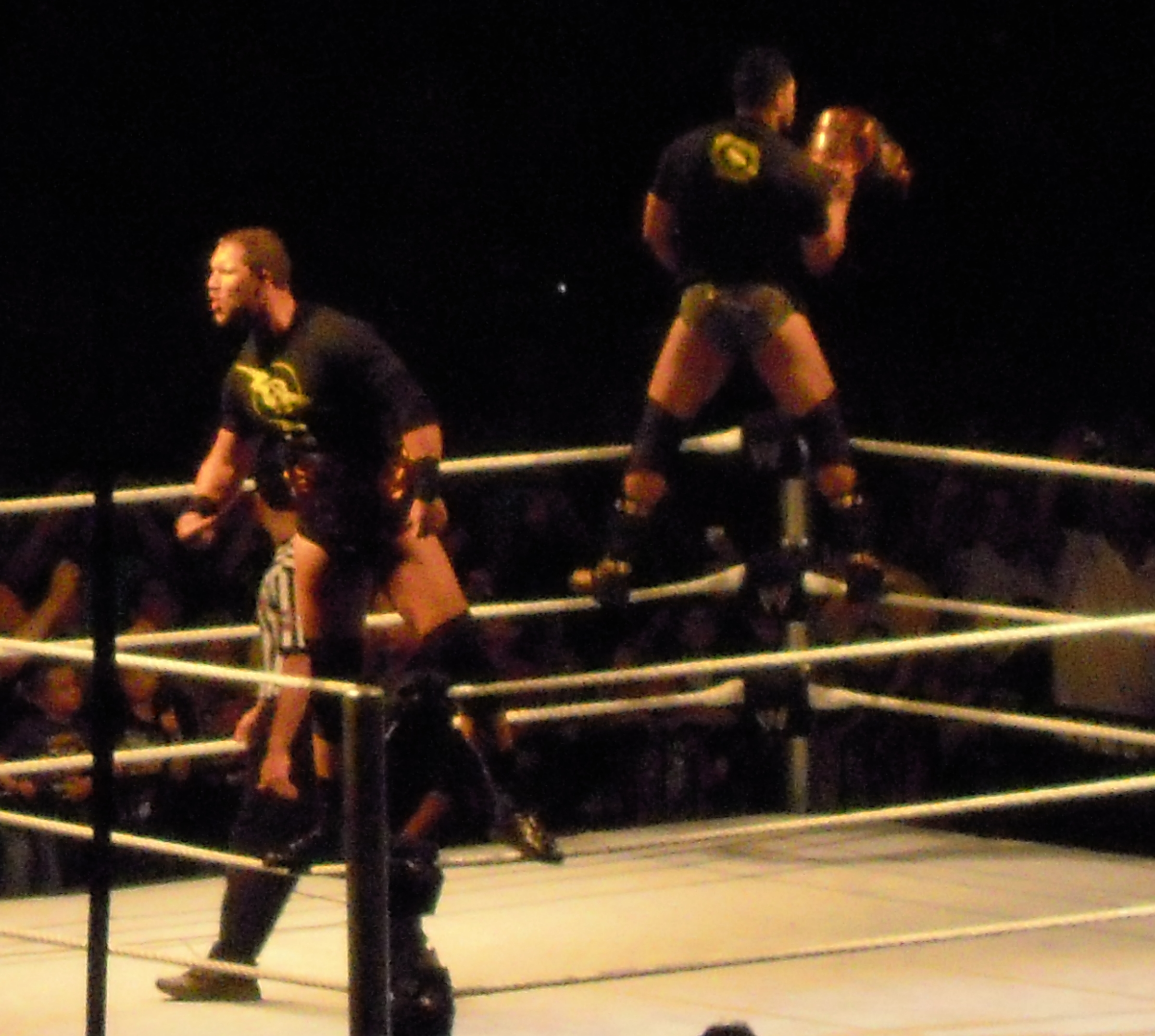
David Otunga (right) and Michael McGillicutty as WWE Tag Team Champions

- The Baltimore Sun
  - Feud of the Year (2010) vs. John Cena
- Pro Wrestling Illustrated
  - Feud of the Year (2010) vs. WWE
  - Most Hated Wrestler of the Year (2010)
  - Rookie of the Year (2010) – David Otunga
- World Wrestling Entertainment/WWE
  - WWE Championship (1 time) – CM Punk
  - WWE Tag Team Championship (3 times) – John Cena and David Otunga (1), Heath Slater and Justin Gabriel (1), David Otunga and Michael McGillicutty (1)
  - Slammy Award (1 time)
    - Shocker of the Year (2010) The debut of The Nexus

== Media ==
- WWE: Wrestling's Greatest Factions (May 27, 2014, DVD)
