= Money in the Bank (2010) =

World Wrestling Entertainment pay-per-view event

- Promotional poster featuring Kofi Kingston
- Promotion: World Wrestling Entertainment
- Brand(s): Raw; SmackDown
- Date: July 18, 2010
- City: Kansas City, Missouri
- Venue: Sprint Center
- Attendance: 8,000
- Buy rate: 169,000

Pay-per-view chronology
← Previous; Fatal 4-Way	Next → SummerSlam

Money in the Bank chronology
← Previous; First	Next → 2011

The 2010 Money in the Bank was a professional wrestling pay-per-view (PPV) event produced by World Wrestling Entertainment (WWE). It was the inaugural Money in the Bank event and took place on Sunday, July 18, 2010, at the Sprint Center in Kansas City, Missouri, held for wrestlers from the promotion's Raw and SmackDown brand divisions. The event centered on the men's Money in the Bank ladder match, a multi-person ladder match where the wrestlers compete to retrieve a briefcase hanging above the ring which contains a contract for a guaranteed world championship match at any time within the next year.

The eponymous ladder match was previously held as an annual match at WWE's flagship event, WrestleMania, from 2005 to 2010. Following WrestleMania XXVI in March, the match concept was spun off into its own PPV event, replacing Night of Champions in the July slot as Night of Champions was pushed back to September, replacing Breaking Point. The inaugural Money in the Bank event received 169,000 pay-per-view buys.

Eight matches were contested at the event, including two Money in the Bank ladder matches, one for each brand. In the main event, Sheamus retained Raw's WWE Championship against John Cena in a Steel Cage match, following an interference from The Nexus. For the event's two Money in the Bank ladder matches, The Miz won Raw's ladder match against Chris Jericho, Edge, Evan Bourne, John Morrison, Mark Henry, Randy Orton, and Ted DiBiase to earn a WWE Championship match contract, while in the opening bout, Kane won SmackDown's ladder match against Big Show, Christian, Cody Rhodes, Dolph Ziggler, Drew McIntyre, Kofi Kingston, and Matt Hardy for the same opportunity but for the World Championship. The undercard featured The Hart Dynasty (David Hart Smith and Tyson Kidd) retaining the Unified WWE Tag Team Championship against The Usos (Jey Uso and Jimmy Uso) and Layla retaining SmackDown's WWE Women's Championship against Kelly Kelly. Also on the card, Rey Mysterio defeated Jack Swagger to retain the World Championship, only to lose it minutes later to Kane, who cashed in the Money in the Bank contract he won earlier in the event to defeat Mysterio for the title—following Kane's win, the title went back to being called by its full name of World Heavyweight Championship.

== Production ==
=== Background ===
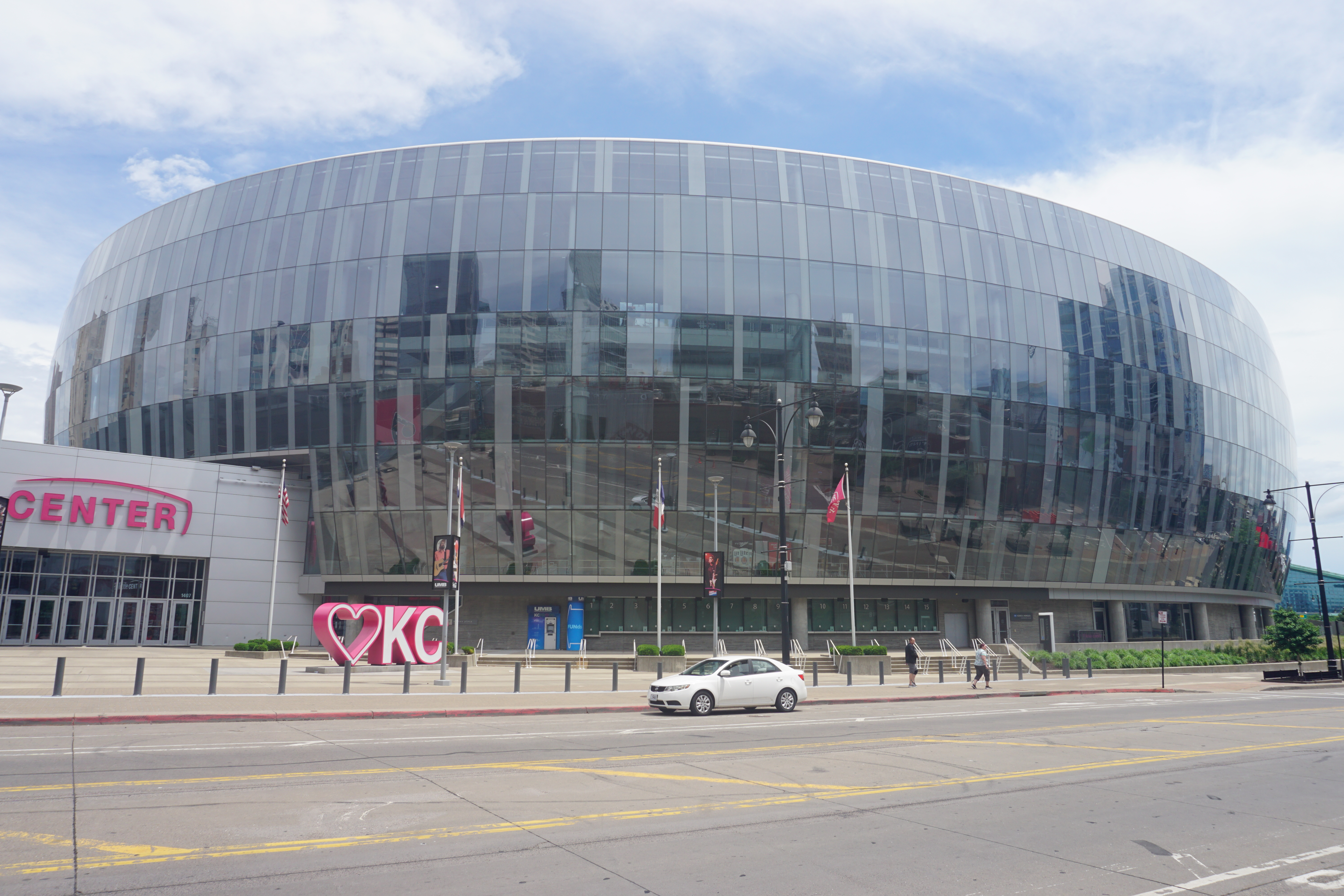
The inaugural Money in the Bank was held at the Sprint Center in Kansas City, Missouri.

In 2005, the professional wrestling company World Wrestling Entertainment (WWE) established the Money in the Bank ladder match as an annual bout at their marquee pay-per-view (PPV) event, WrestleMania, debuting at WrestleMania 21. The match features multiple wrestlers using ladders to retrieve a briefcase hanging above the ring. The briefcase contains a contract that guarantees the winner a match for a world championship at any time within the next year. Following WrestleMania XXVI in March 2010, WWE established a separate PPV event titled Money in the Bank, centered on the match, which subsequently ceased being held at WrestleMania. The event was held on July 18, 2010, at the Sprint Center in Kansas City, Missouri. Tickets went on sale on May 22.

Unlike WrestleMania, the Money in the Bank event included two ladder matches. One was exclusive to wrestlers from the Raw brand while the other was exclusive to those from SmackDown. Raw's match granted a contract for a WWE Championship match while SmackDown's granted a World Heavyweight Championship match contract.

=== Storylines ===
Money in the Bank comprised professional wrestling matches involving professional wrestlers performing as characters in scripted events pre-determined by the hosting promotion, WWE. Storylines between the characters were produced on WWE's weekly television shows Raw and SmackDown with the Raw and SmackDown brands—storyline divisions in which WWE assigned its employees to different programs.

At Fatal 4-Way, the Money in the Bank ladder match was scheduled for the namesake pay-per-view. On the June 25 episode of SmackDown, it was revealed that two Money in the Bank ladder matches would be held at the event for the Raw and SmackDown brands, respectively, with the winners of the matches given a title match for the respective WWE Championship and World Heavyweight Championship at a time of their choosing within the next 12 months. Three days later, Raw guest host Rob Zombie named the Raw brand's eight competitors: Randy Orton, The Miz, R-Truth, Chris Jericho, Evan Bourne, Ted DiBiase Jr., John Morrison, and Edge. On the July 5 episode of Raw, The Miz attacked and injured R-Truth; he was taken out of the Money in the Bank match and replaced with Mark Henry the following week.

On June 30, six of the competitors for the SmackDown brand's match were named: Matt Hardy, Kane, Cody Rhodes, Christian, Kofi Kingston, and Big Show. On the July 9 episode of SmackDown, Dolph Ziggler defeated Montel Vontavious Porter and Chavo Guerrero Jr. in a triple threat match to qualify for SmackDown's ladder match. On the same night, Drew McIntyre earned the final spot by pinning Kofi Kingston.

The main rivalry from the SmackDown brand heading into the Money in the Bank event was between Rey Mysterio and Jack Swagger over the World Heavyweight Championship. Mysterio replaced The Undertaker, who was found in a vegetative state by his brother Kane, in a fatal four-way match, which also involved defending Champion Swagger, CM Punk, and Big Show, to become a two-time World Heavyweight Champion. On the June 25 episode of SmackDown, a rematch between Swagger and Mysterio was scheduled for Money in the Bank.

The main rivalry from the Raw brand heading into Money in the Bank was between WWE Champion Sheamus and John Cena. Sheamus won the title at the Fatal 4-Way event after interference from seven of the contestants from the first season of NXT, collectively known as "The Nexus". The next night on Raw, John Cena invoked his rematch clause, but The Nexus interrupted the match. The following week on Raw, Raw's anonymous general manager scheduled a Steel Cage match between Sheamus and Cena to ensure no outside interference from The Nexus.

== Event ==
Other on-screen personnel
Role:	Name:
English commentators	Michael Cole
English commentators	Jerry Lawler
English commentators	Matt Striker
Spanish commentators	Carlos Cabrera
Spanish commentators	Hugo Savinovich
Ring announcers	Tony Chimel
Ring announcers	Justin Roberts
Backstage interviewer	Josh Mathews
Referees	Charles Robinson
Referees	Mike Chioda
Referees	John Cone
Referees	Jack Doan
Referees	Rod Zapata

=== Preliminary matches ===
The actual pay-per-view opened with the Money in the Bank ladder match for a World Heavyweight Championship match contract, which involved Big Show, Matt Hardy, Christian, Kane, Kofi Kingston, Cody Rhodes, Drew McIntyre, and Dolph Ziggler. Midway through the match, Kingston performed a Boom Drop off a ladder on McIntyre through a broadcast table. Big Show climbed a super-sized ladder he had set up, but Kane pushed the ladder over and Christian and Rhodes buried Big Show under multiple ladders. In the end, McIntyre attempted to retrieve the briefcase, but Kane performed a chokeslam off the ladder on McIntyre and retrieved the briefcase to win the match.

Next, Alicia Fox defended the WWE Divas Championship against Eve Torres. In the end, Fox performed a scissors kick on Eve to retain the title.

After that, The Hart Dynasty defended the Unified WWE Tag Team Championship against The Usos (Jey Uso and Jimmy Uso). Smith forced Jimmy to submit to the sharpshooter to retain the titles.

In the fourth match, Rey Mysterio faced Jack Swagger for the World Heavyweight Championship. In the end, Swagger applied an ankle lock on Mysterio, but Mysterio removed his boot, performed a hurricanrana on Swagger and pinned Swagger with a rana to retain the title. After the match, Swagger attacked Mysterio, but Kane entered the ring and chased off Swagger. After that, Kane then returned to the ring with referee Charles Robinson and his briefcase, electing to cash in his contract, marking the first time a wrestler cashed in their briefcase on the same night they won it. Kane then chokeslammed an injured Mysterio before executing a Tombstone Piledriver to win the World Heavyweight title in 54 seconds.

Next, Layla defended the WWE Women's Championship against Kelly Kelly. In the end, Kelly attempted a sunset flip on Layla, who countered into a roll-up to retain the title.

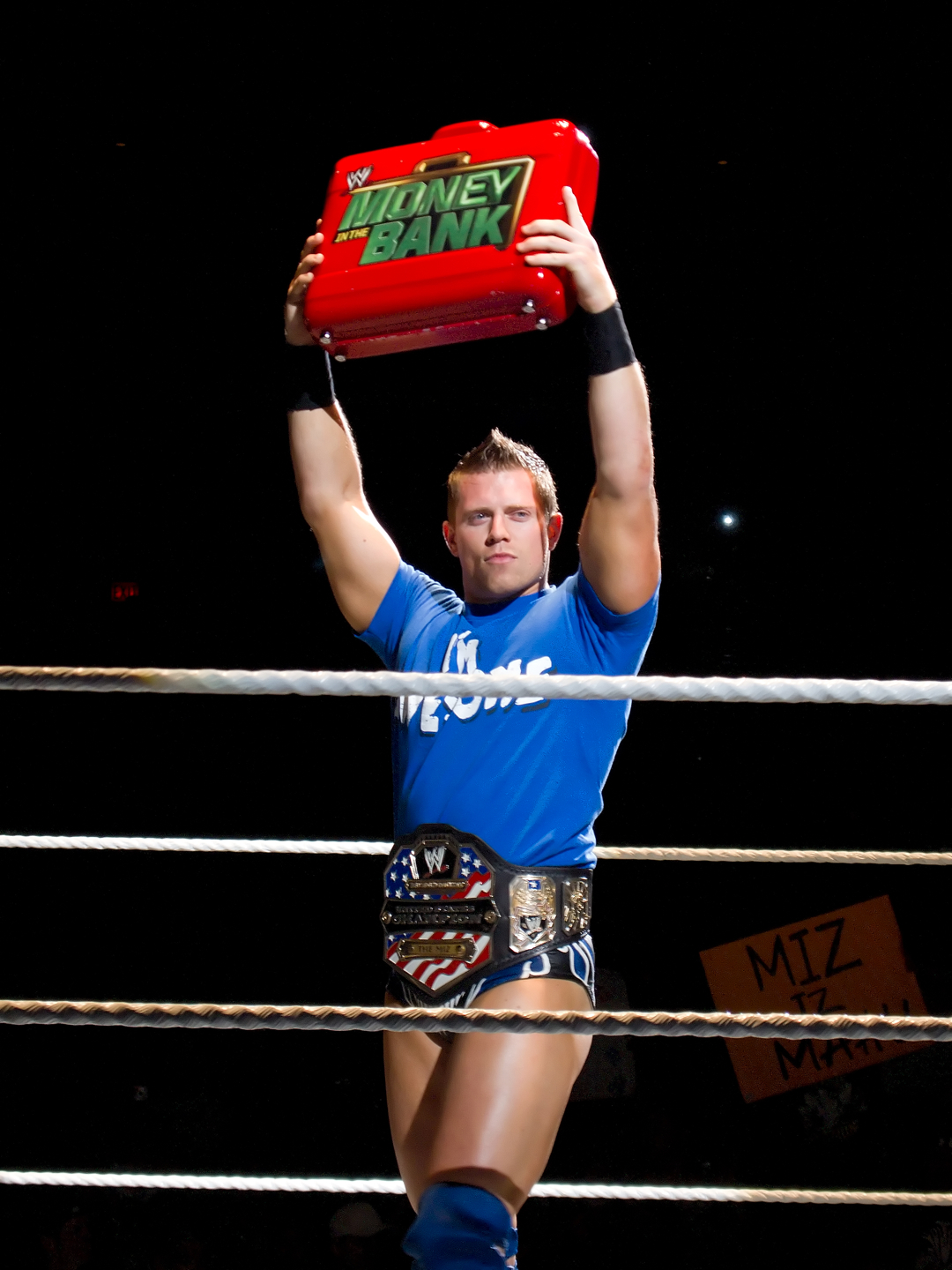
The Miz as Raw's United States Champion and the Money in the Bank contract holder in August 2010.

After that was the Money in the Bank ladder match for a WWE Championship match contract involving Randy Orton, Chris Jericho, Edge, Evan Bourne, John Morrison, The Miz, Mark Henry, and Ted DiBiase Jr. During the match, Orton performed an elevated DDT on Bourne using a ladder. The Miz attempted a catapult on Morrison into a ladder, but Morrison climbed the ladder and used another ladder to climb a ladder set up underneath the briefcase. Edge trapped Morrison in the ladder and, along with The Miz, drove another ladder into Morrison. Morrison performed a springboard roundhouse kick using the ring apron on Henry, Jericho performed a Codebreaker on Henry and Edge performed a spear on Henry. In the end, Orton attempted to retrieve the briefcase but The Miz pushed the ladder, causing Orton to fall, and retrieved the briefcase to win the match.

=== Main event ===
In the main event, Sheamus defended the WWE Championship against John Cena in a Steel Cage match. Sheamus threw Cena into the cage first. It was followed by Cena doing the same. Cena intercepted Sheamus with a twisted slam for a two count. Sheamus attacked with axe handles. After two axe handles, Cena countered the third one and lifted Sheamus for the Attitude Adjustment, but Sheamus escaped. After battling on the top rope, Cena took Sheamus down with a bulldog from the top turnbuckle only for Sheamus to kickout. Sheamus was then laid down for the Five Knuckle Shuffle. Cena tried another Five Knuckle Shuffle from the top turnbuckle but Sheamus moved out of the way. He tied Cena to the middle rope and climbed through Cena to the top. Cena freed himself and tried to stop Sheamus. Sheamus then caught Cena in a sleeper hold which interesting sequence on the top rope. Sheamus delivered a Brogue Kick for a near fall. He took Cena for a Celtic Cross; but Cena countered into an Attitude Adjustment, which Sheamus recountered into Irish Curse Backbreaker. Cena delivered the Attitude Adjustment only to score a near fall. The Nexus (led by Wade Barrett) interfered with Michael Tarver bringing in Bolt Cutters. A referee at the outside stole the cutters and ran away. Another referee threw away key to the cage when Barrett asked for it. A brawl between Cena and Sheamus ended up hurting the referee inside the ring. Cena took Sheamus into the STF and Sheamus tapped out but no one saw. Cena tried to escape the cage but Justin Gabriel interfered only to be thrown off the cage. More Nexus members started interfering Cena and Sheamus recovered and climbed the cage quickly. He intercepted Heath Slater and came off and escaped the arena into the crowd, winning the match and retaining the championship. After the match, Cena attacked Darren Young and Tarver at the ringside and walked away with Tarver's Nexus armband.

== Reception ==
Andy McNamara, a reviewer for the Canadian Online Explorer's wrestling section, rated both Money in the Bank ladder matches a 4 out of 5, the WWE Championship match a 3 out of 5, and the World Heavyweight Championship match a 3.5 out of 5. The event was attended live by a crowd of 8,000 fans. Money in the Bank drew 169,000 pay-per-view buys, approximately 99,000 of which came in the United States.

== Aftermath ==
Kane was then involved in a feud with his (kayfabe) brother The Undertaker, facing him on several occasions. The next night on Raw, Edge, Chris Jericho and Randy Orton faced off in a triple threat match, where the winner would face Sheamus at SummerSlam for the WWE Championship, which Orton won. At SummerSlam, due to Orton winning the match via disqualification, Orton did not win the title.

On the following episode of SmackDown, Rey Mysterio faced Jack Swagger in a two out of three falls match to determine Kane's opponent at SummerSlam. Mysterio defeated Swagger to earn a championship rematch, but was unsuccessful in regaining the championship at the event.

On the November 22 episode of Raw, The Miz successfully cashed in the briefcase on Randy Orton (who won the title back at Night of Champions) to win the WWE Championship.

A second Money in the Bank event occurred the following year, thus establishing the show as an annual pay-per-view for the promotion, which became simply known as "WWE" in April 2011. This was the only Money in the Bank event held before the original World Tag Team Championship was deactivated in August in favor of the WWE Tag Team Championship, which became available to both brands; since WrestleMania 25 in April 2009, both titles were held and defended together across all brands as the Unified WWE Tag Team Championship. It would also be the only Money in the Bank event held before the original WWE Women's Championship was deactivated in September in favor of the WWE Divas Championship, which also became available to both brands. While the namesake match was originally only for men, a women's version was introduced at the 2017 event, and each year's show now features a men's and women's match. While Money in the Bank had been established as one of WWE's monthly PPVs held between their "Big Four" shows (Royal Rumble, WrestleMania, SummerSlam, and Survivor Series), in August 2021, WWE President and Chief Revenue Officer Nick Khan referred to Money in the Bank as one of the company's "five annual tentpoles", thus elevating the event's status as one of WWE's five biggest events of the year, referred to as the "Big Five".

== Results ==
No.	Results	Stipulations	Times
1^{D}	Santino Marella defeated William Regal by pinfall	Singles match	4:36
2	Kane defeated Big Show, Christian, Cody Rhodes, Dolph Ziggler, Drew McIntyre, Kofi Kingston, and Matt Hardy by retrieving the briefcase	Money in the Bank ladder match for a World Heavyweight Championship match contract	26:18
3	Alicia Fox (c) defeated Eve Torres by pinfall	Singles match for the WWE Divas Championship	5:52
4	The Hart Dynasty (David Hart Smith and Tyson Kidd) (with Natalya) (c) defeated The Usos (Jey Uso and Jimmy Uso) (with Tamina) by submission	Tag team match for the Unified WWE Tag Team Championship (Note: The name "Unified WWE Tag Team Championship" referred to both the World Tag Team Championship and WWE Tag Team Championship being held and defended together, although both titles remained independently active.)	5:53
5	Rey Mysterio (c) defeated Jack Swagger by pinfall	Singles match for the World Championship	10:43
6	Kane defeated Rey Mysterio (c) by pinfall	Singles match for the World Heavyweight Championship; This was Kane's Money in the Bank cash-in match.	0:54
7	Layla (c) (with Michelle McCool) defeated Kelly Kelly (with Tiffany) by pinfall	Singles match for the WWE Women's Championship	3:56
8	The Miz defeated Chris Jericho, Edge, Evan Bourne, John Morrison, Mark Henry, Randy Orton, and Ted DiBiase by retrieving the briefcase	Money in the Bank ladder match for a WWE Championship match contract	20:26
9	Sheamus (c) defeated John Cena by escaping the cage	Steel Cage match for the WWE Championship	23:19
(c) / – the champion(s) heading into the match; D / – this was a dark match
