= David Otunga =

American professional wrestler (born 1980)

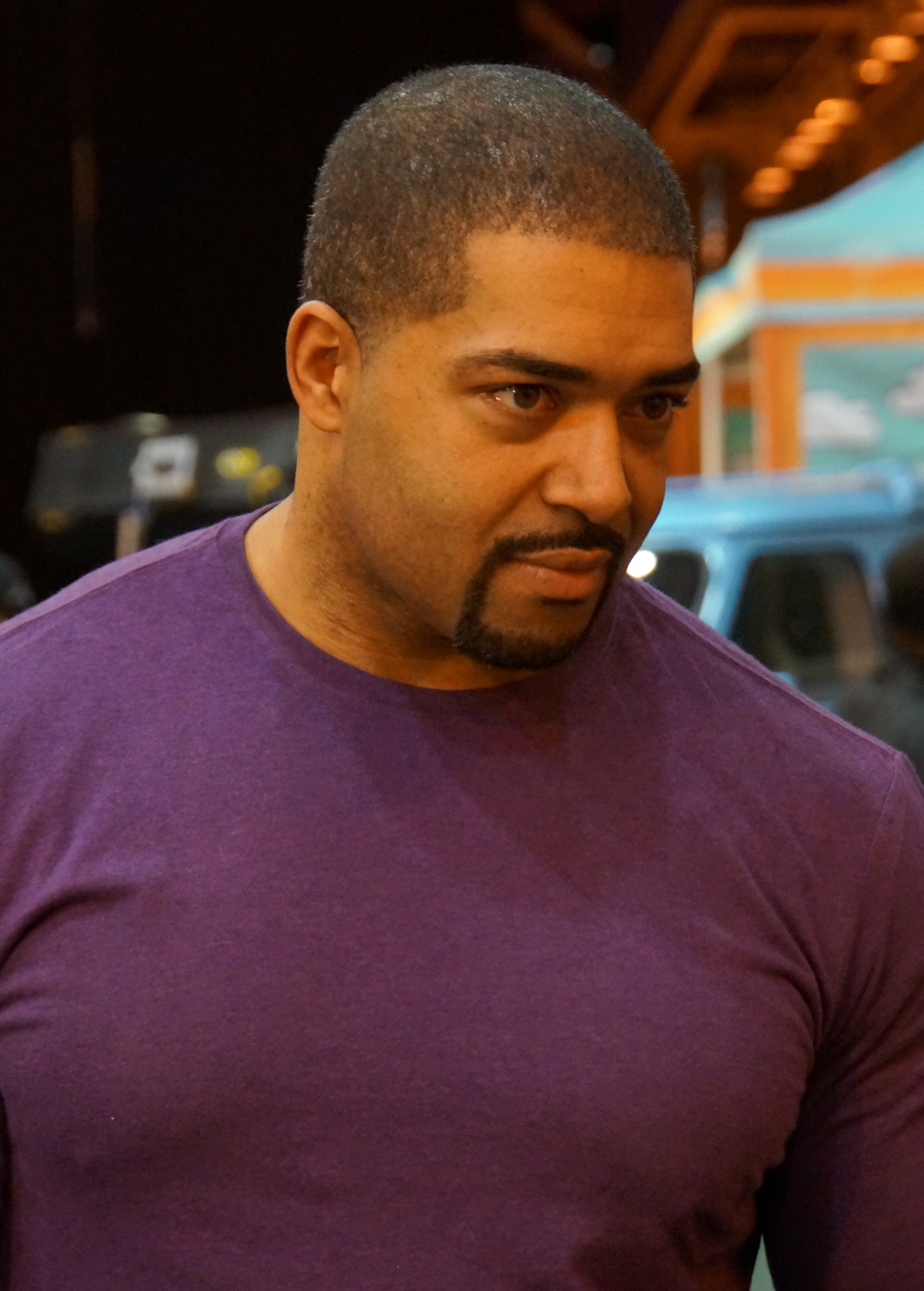
- Otunga in 2014

Personal information
- Born: David Daniel Otunga; April 7, 1980 (age 46) Elgin, Illinois, U.S.
- Occupations: Actor; lawyer; professional wrestler
- Years active: 2005–2007 (law); 2007–present (acting); 2009–2015 (wrestling)
- Life partner: Jennifer Hudson (2007–2017)
- Children: 1
- Website: davidotunga.com

Professional wrestling career
- Ring name(s): David Otunga; Dawson Alexander
- Billed height: 6 ft 0 in (1.83 m)
- Billed weight: 229 lb (104 kg)
- Billed from: Hollywood, California
- Trained by: Tom Prichard; Norman Smiley
- Debut: May 29, 2009
- Retired: July 5, 2015

David Daniel Otunga (born April 7, 1980) is an American actor, lawyer and retired professional wrestler. He is best known for his tenure with WWE from 2009 to 2020.

Otunga was the runner-up on the first season of WWE NXT and later an original member of The Nexus and The New Nexus, being the only member present through the entire duration of the stable in every incarnation. He became a two-time WWE Tag Team Champion, having one reign each with fellow Nexus members John Cena and Michael McGillicutty.

== Early life ==
David Daniel Otunga was born in Elgin, Illinois on April 7, 1980, the son of teachers Billie and Moses Otunga. His mother is American and his father is Kenyan. He has two older siblings. He graduated from Larkin High School and later earned a bachelor's degree in psychology from the University of Illinois. Following his graduation, he moved to New York City to become a laboratory manager in Columbia University's Cognitive Neuroscience Center.

== Law career ==
Otunga graduated from Harvard Law School in 2006, passing Illinois' bar exam. He worked at Sidley Austin, one of America's largest law firms, from May 2005 to October 2007.

== Acting career ==
In 2007, after his niece submitted his audition tape, Otunga was chosen to be a contestant on I Love New York 2 and given the nickname "Punk". He became one of the final three contestants in the competition, before being eliminated on the series' penultimate episode. Otunga has since starred in the 2013 thriller film The Call. Otunga made a guest appearance as himself in the 13,110th episode (Season 52, Episode 84) of General Hospital. also played in an episode of criminal minds as a bouncer in episode 12 of the same season.

== Professional wrestling career ==
=== World Wrestling Entertainment / WWE (2008–2019) ===
==== FCW (2008–2010) ====
In November 2008, Otunga signed a developmental contract with World Wrestling Entertainment (WWE) and was assigned to its development territory, Florida Championship Wrestling. He made his debut on May 29, 2009, under the ring name Dawson Alexander, in a six-man tag team match. Otunga teamed with Barry Allen and Jon Cutler to defeat Abraham Saddam Washington, Derrick Bateman and Camacho.

==== NXT (2010) ====
On February 16, 2010, after numerous dark matches on both Raw and SmackDown, it was announced that Otunga would wrestle on the first season of NXT under his real name, with R-Truth as his storyline mentor. He made his debut on the inaugural episode of NXT on February 23, quickly defeating Darren Young. Young defeated Otunga in a rematch on the following week's broadcast, thanks to interference from Young's mentor, CM Punk. After the match, R-Truth tried to offer his support, only to be shoved away by a frustrated Otunga, resulting in Otunga turning heel. R-Truth took exception, confronting and brawling with Otunga backstage. On the March 30 episode of NXT, Otunga won an 8-man over the top rope battle royal against the other NXT Rookies to earn the right to guest host Raw the following week. On the April 5 episode of Raw, Otunga put himself in a tag team match with John Cena for the Unified WWE Tag Team Championship against ShoMiz (Big Show and The Miz). Later in the match, however, he refused to tag in and walked out, allowing ShoMiz to retain. On May 11, in the second Pros Poll, he was moved to second place. During the season finale on June 1, Otunga came in second place overall in the competition, losing out to Wade Barrett.

==== The Nexus (2010–2011) ====
The following week on Raw, Otunga and the other NXT rookies from season one interfered in the main event match between John Cena and CM Punk, attacking the competitors, the announce team, and ring announcer Justin Roberts, before dismantling the ring area and surrounding equipment. On the June 14 episode of Raw, the rookies attacked General Manager Bret Hart, when he refused to give them contracts. The following week on Raw, Vince McMahon fired Hart and announced the hiring of a new general manager, who had signed all seven season one NXT rookies to contracts. The following week, the group was named The Nexus. On the July 12 episode of Raw, The Nexus, excluding Daniel Bryan (who was fired by Vince McMahon after the Nexus' first night on Raw in part due to choking ring announcer Justin Roberts with his own tie), competed in their first match together, defeating John Cena in a six-on-one handicap match. The Nexus continued to feud with Cena and the Raw roster, resulting in a seven-on-seven elimination tag team match at SummerSlam. Otunga was the fourth member of The Nexus eliminated, when he submitted to Chris Jericho, and The Nexus went on to lose the match.

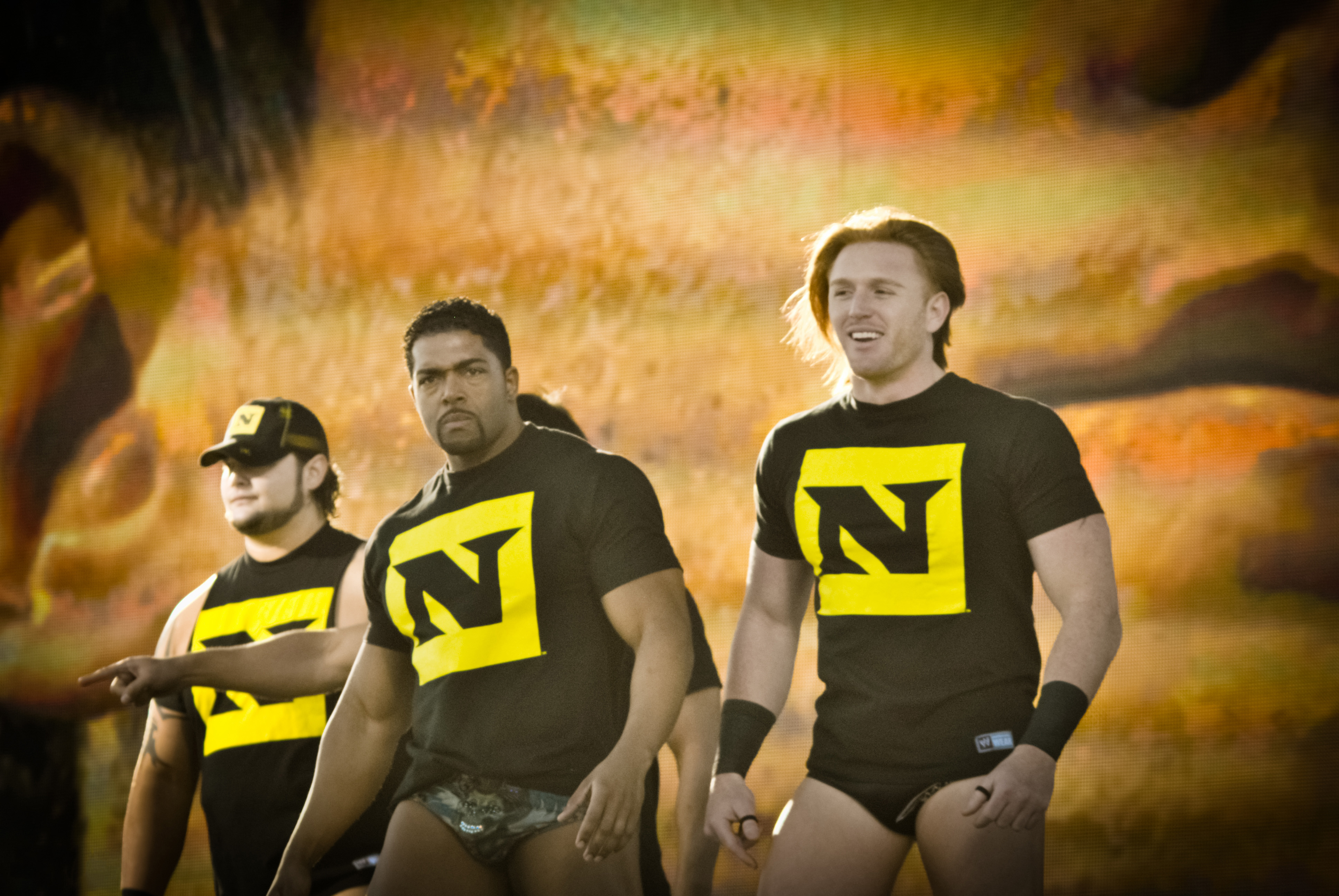
David Otunga as part of The Nexus at Tribute to the Troops in December 2010

Cena was later forced to join The Nexus, as a result of losing to Barrett at Hell in a Cell. At the following pay-per-view, Bragging Rights on October 24, Otunga and Cena teamed together to win the WWE Tag Team Championship from Cody Rhodes and Drew McIntyre. The next night on Raw Otunga and Cena lost the Tag Team Championship to fellow Nexus members Justin Gabriel and Heath Slater when Barrett ordered Otunga to allow Slater to pin him. On November 5, Otunga, who had been questioning Barrett's leadership in the past weeks, led Nexus, minus Barrett and Cena, to an invasion of SmackDown. Barrett did not approve of Otunga's decision to lead The Nexus to SmackDown and as a result forced him to defend his spot in the group a week later. On the November 12 episode of SmackDown, Otunga defeated Edge in a lumberjack match, after Kane interfered, to keep his spot in Nexus. About a month later, Otunga started to rebel against Barrett with the rest of Nexus behind him. After the group disobeyed direct orders and walked away from Barrett, Otunga told Barrett to rehire Cena the following week or be banished from Nexus.

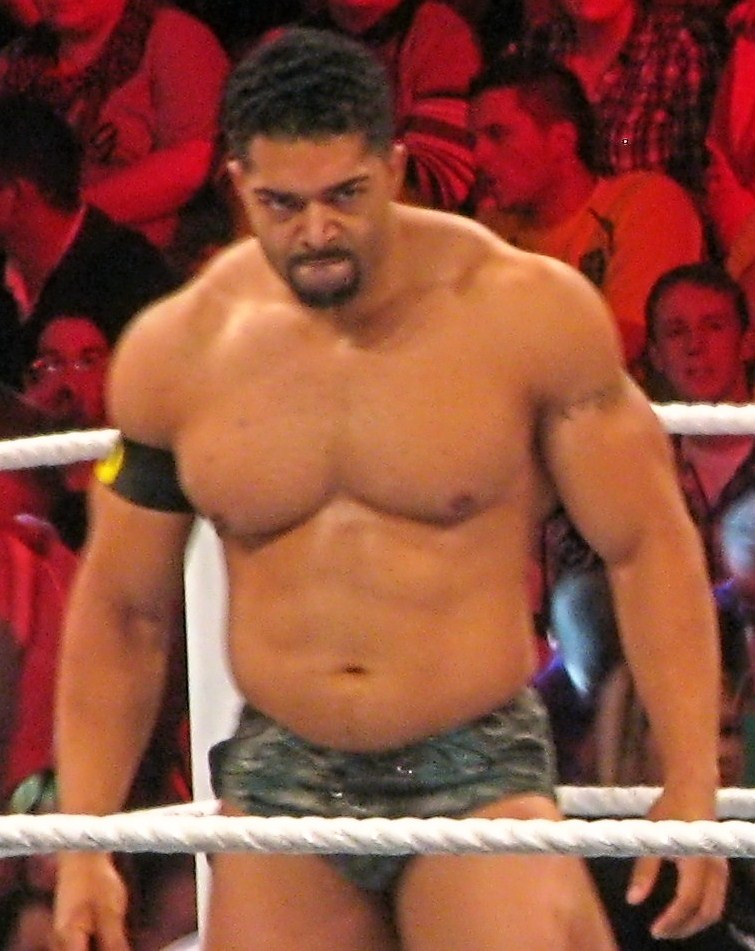
David Otunga on an episode of Raw in early 2011

In January 2011, Barrett was exiled from Nexus and CM Punk took over his spot as the leader of the group. While Justin Gabriel and Heath Slater chose not to follow Punk's orders and left Nexus, Otunga agreed to take his initiation test, a beating from the Big Show, and remain with the group. In late February, it was announced that Punk would face Randy Orton at WrestleMania XXVII, with each member of The Nexus facing Orton to win the right to accompany Punk to the ring in the weeks leading up to WrestleMania. Otunga faced Orton on the March 7 episode of Raw, but lost. Following the match, he was punted in the skull by Orton. Otunga was absent from television for over a month, returning on the April 11 episode of Raw with the other New Nexus members, and preventing Orton from earning a WWE Championship match.

On the May 23 episode of Raw, Otunga teamed with fellow Nexus member Michael McGillicutty to win the WWE Tag Team Championship from Kane and The Big Show with the help interference from fellow New Nexus members Mason Ryan and Punk. They made their only successful title defense against The Usos on the July 29 episode of SmackDown. After CM Punk left the New Nexus when his WWE contract expired on July 17, Otunga and McGillicutty competed against Santino Marella and Zack Ryder on the August 1 episode of Raw without any Nexus gear or armbands, and with all Nexus logos removed from their TitanTron, effectively signaling the end of the New Nexus. On the August 22 episode of Raw, Otunga and McGillicutty lost the Tag Team Championship to Air Boom (Kofi Kingston and Evan Bourne).

==== Legal advisor (2011–2015) ====
After a minor feud with Jerry Lawler, Otunga and McGillicutty's team quietly disbanded. Otunga then started a new storyline, focusing on his law background, as John Laurinaitis advised him to help disgruntled wrestlers plan a lawsuit against Triple H, WWE's chief operating officer. He also started carrying a Starbucks thermos. On the September 30 episode of SmackDown, Otunga and Laurinaitis sat down with Dolph Ziggler, Jack Swagger, Cody Rhodes, Alberto Del Rio, Christian, and Vickie Guerrero to discuss the matter. The following week on Raw SuperShow, Otunga walked out on Triple H with other wrestlers, Divas, and referees after a "vote of no confidence" for Triple H as COO. He returned to in-ring action on the November 29 SmackDown Holiday Special where he was defeated by Randy Orton in a Miracle on 34th Street Fight match. On the December 23 episode of SmackDown he cancelled a #1 Contender's match between Big Show and Mark Henry due to Henry's leg injury; he was knocked out by Big Show as a result. Otunga faced Big Show on the December 26 episode of Raw SuperShow and the December 30 episode of SmackDown, but lost both matches. He obtained his first win since returning to singles competition on the January 13, 2012, episode of SmackDown, defeating Santino Marella. He captured back-to-back wins against Ezekiel Jackson on the February 20 episode of Raw SuperShow and the February 21 episode of Super SmackDown. On the March 12 episode of Raw SuperShow, it was announced that Otunga would be the captain of Laurinaitis' team for the battle for control 12-man Tag Team match at WrestleMania XXVIII. Team Johnny was victorious at WrestleMania. On the April 16 episode of Raw SuperShow, Otunga unsuccessfully challenged Santino Marella for the United States Championship. Otunga took leave from WWE television from April 23 to May 14 to be with his fiancé, Jennifer Hudson, during the murder trial of William Balfour in Chicago.

At No Way Out, Otunga lost to Brodus Clay via count out. The next night on Raw SuperShow, Otunga teamed with Big Show and John Laurinaitis in a 3 on 1 handicap match. Before the match started, Big Show walked out on Otunga and Laurinaitis. Otunga walked out as well during the match, because Laurinaitis had refused to tag himself in, allowing John Cena to make Laurinaitis submit. The next week on SmackDown, Otunga delivered a low blow to Brodus Clay as Clay was fighting Big Show. He returned to Raw on August 20 to confront general manager AJ Lee. He was put into a match against Big Show, which he lost. On September 3, Otunga was seen with Alberto Del Rio, who told Matt Striker that his client (Del Rio) won't talk to him. On the September 7 episode of SmackDown, he represented Alberto Del Rio and Ricardo Rodriguez to win the case to ban Sheamus' finishing move, the Brogue Kick, just as Otunga was facing Sheamus at the night's main event, although the Brogue Kick was later reinstated. He managed Alberto Del Rio at Night of Champions in his match with Sheamus for the World Heavyweight Championship which Del Rio lost. At Survivor Series, Otunga was made a part of Team Ziggler, filling in for the injured Cody Rhodes. He was eliminated by Daniel Bryan. Otunga competed in the 2013 Royal Rumble match entering at #9 but was eliminated by Sheamus. His last singles match was a loss to Ryback. Since then, he has been doing promotional work for WWE backstage. Otunga returned on October 28 when he conducted an interview for WWE.com after Big Show sued WWE and Triple H for defamation, discrimination and wrongful termination of contract.

Otunga returned on April 6, 2014, in the André the Giant Memorial Battle Royal at WrestleMania XXX and was eliminated by Big E. Otunga did not make any WWE appearances again until he returned to live events on January 9, 2015. His last match was on July 5, 2015, on a WWE Live SummerSlam Heatwave Tour where he lost to R-Truth.

==== Non-wrestling roles (2015–2019) ====
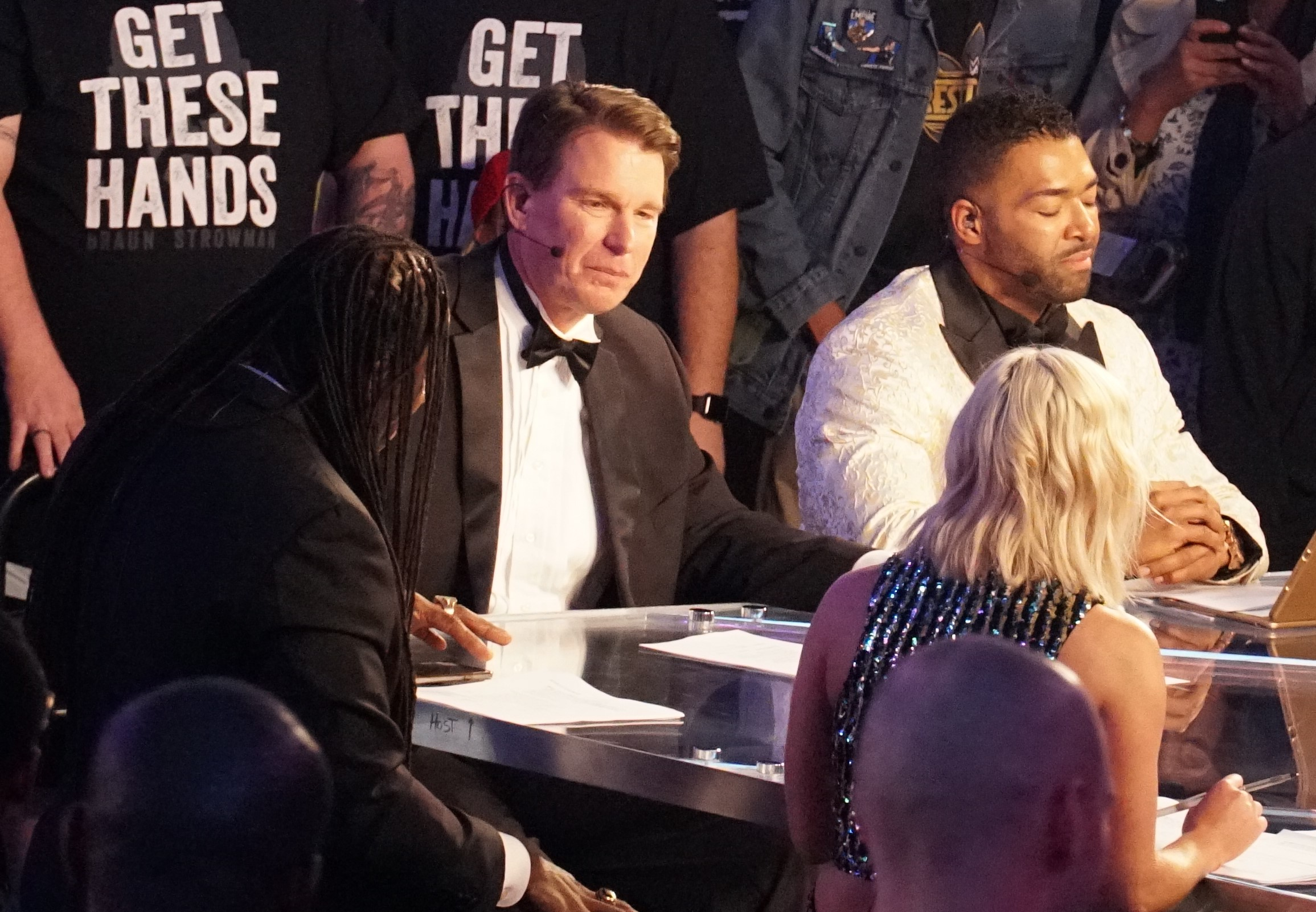
Otunga (right) with John Layfield at WrestleMania 34

Otunga returned to television on February 2, 2015, doing the Raw Pre-Show. Following this, he offered his legal services to his former tag team partner Curtis Axel regarding his Royal Rumble 2015 controversy. Now rarely an in-ring performer, Otunga replaced Alex Riley as one of the hosts of the weekly Raw pre-show on the WWE Network.

In June 2016, Otunga left his position on the Raw pre-show panel, where he joined the commentary team alongside Tom Phillips for both Superstars and Main Event. On the June 23 episode of SmackDown, Otunga temporarily replaced Jerry Lawler on the commentary team, after Lawler was suspended by WWE. Following the 2016 WWE draft, Otunga was announced to join the SmackDown commentary team on a full-time basis, alongside Mauro Ranallo and John "Bradshaw" Layfield, where he served as the babyface color commentator in contrast to JBL's heel color commentary.

On April 11, 2017, it was reported that Otunga was traded to the Raw brand for Byron Saxton as part of the 2017 WWE Superstar Shake-up. However, due to his acting career, he was replaced by Booker T on Raw for six weeks. Upon Otunga's return, Booker remained Raw color commentator while Otunga became a pre-show panelist. He last appeared on commentary on the August 20, 2019 episode of SmackDown.

On April 15, 2020, David Otunga was released from the WWE due to COVID budget cuts alongside many other wrestlers.

== Personal life ==
Otunga met singer and actress Jennifer Hudson in 2007, and they dated for seven months before becoming engaged on her 27th birthday. Their son, David Daniel Otunga Jr., was born on August 10, 2009. They never married and separated in November 2017.

== Credits ==
=== Film ===
Year	Title	Role	Notes
2013	The Call	Officer Jake Devans	
2016	What Happen Last Night	Tiny	
2017	Days Like This	Lance	
2017	Live To Tell	Lt. Michael 'Lou' Ortega	
2017	Sandy Wexler	Reporter at Hollywood Sign	
2019	A Madea Family Funeral	Will	

=== Television ===
Year	Title	Role	Notes
2007	I Love New York 2	Punk	
2012	The Tonight Show with Jay Leno	Himself	
2012–2013	The Wendy Williams Show	Himself	2 episodes
2013–2016	Steve Harvey Show	Himself	Panelist
2013	The Haves and the Have Nots	Officer Mason	
2014	Celebrity Ghost Stories	Himself	
2014	General Hospital	Himself	
2017	Criminal Minds	Dwayne Jerrard	Episode: "A Good Husband"
2018	Family Time	Alvin	Episode: "Work, Wife, Unhappy Life"
2022	She-Hulk: Attorney at Law	Derek	2 episodes
2023	Power Book IV: Force	Gang Chief	Episode: "Chicago Is Heating Up"

=== Video games ===
Year	Title	Notes
2010	WWE SmackDown vs. Raw 2011	DLC
2011	WWE '12	
2012	WWE '13	
2013	WWE 2K14	

== Championships and accomplishments ==
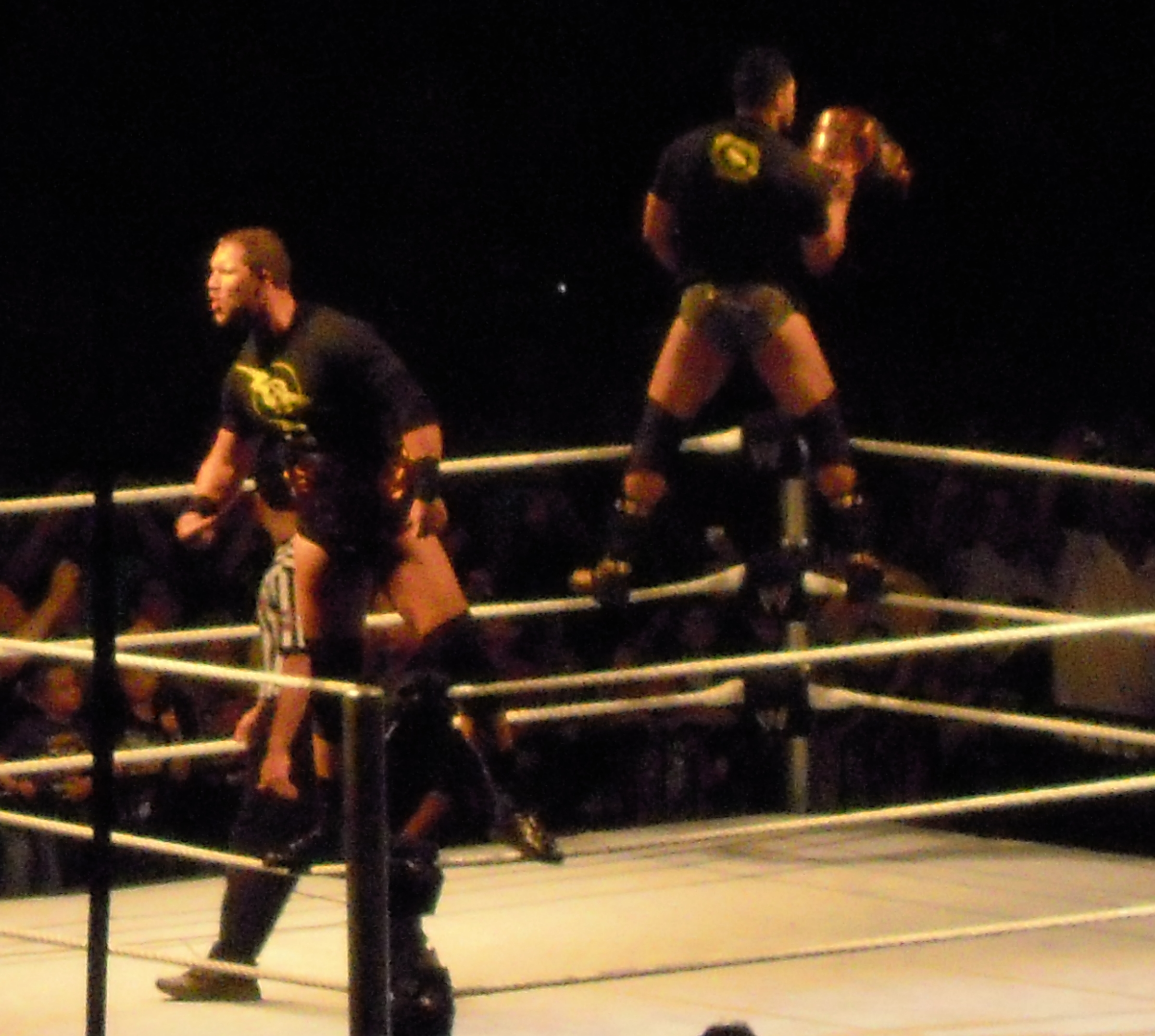
Otunga (right) and McGillicutty as the WWE Tag Team Champions

- Pro Wrestling Illustrated
  - Feud of the Year (2010) The Nexus vs. WWE
  - Most Hated Wrestler of the Year (2010) As part of The Nexus
  - Rookie of the Year (2010)
  - Ranked No. 84 of the top 500 singles wrestlers in the PWI 500 in 2012
- WWE
  - WWE Tag Team Championship (2 times) – with John Cena (1) and Michael McGillicutty (1)
  - Slammy Award (2 times)
    - Shocker of the Year (2010) The debut of The Nexus
    - Pee-wee Herman Bowtie Award (2011)
- Wrestling Observer Newsletter
  - Worst Television Announcer (2016)
