= SummerSlam (2010) =

World Wrestling Entertainment pay-per-view event

- Promotional poster featuring various WWE wrestlers
- Promotion: World Wrestling Entertainment
- Brand(s): Raw; SmackDown
- Date: August 15, 2010
- City: Los Angeles, California
- Venue: Staples Center
- Attendance: 17,463
- Buy rate: 350,000

Pay-per-view chronology
← Previous; Money in the Bank	Next → Night of Champions

SummerSlam chronology
← Previous; 2009	Next → 2011

The 2010 SummerSlam was a professional wrestling pay-per-view (PPV) event produced by World Wrestling Entertainment (WWE). It was the 23rd annual SummerSlam and took place on August 15, 2010, at the Staples Center in Los Angeles, California, held for wrestlers from the promotion's Raw and SmackDown brand divisions. This was the second of six consecutive SummerSlam events to take place at the arena.

Six matches were contested at the event. The main events of the evening included: Team WWE defeating The Nexus in a 7-on-7 elimination tag team match, Randy Orton defeating Sheamus via disqualification for Raw's WWE Championship but Sheamus retained as titles do not change hands by disqualification unless stipulated, Melina winning Raw's Divas Championship against Alicia Fox, and Kane retaining SmackDown's World Heavyweight Championship against Rey Mysterio. Other matches featured on the show were SmackDown's Intercontinental Champion Dolph Ziggler versus Kofi Kingston, but it ended in a no contest, while Big Show defeated The Straight Edge Society (CM Punk, Joey Mercury and Luke Gallows) in a three-on-one handicap match.

SummerSlam received 350,000 pay-per-view buys, a decrease on the 369,000 buys garnered by the 2009 event.

== Production ==
=== Background ===
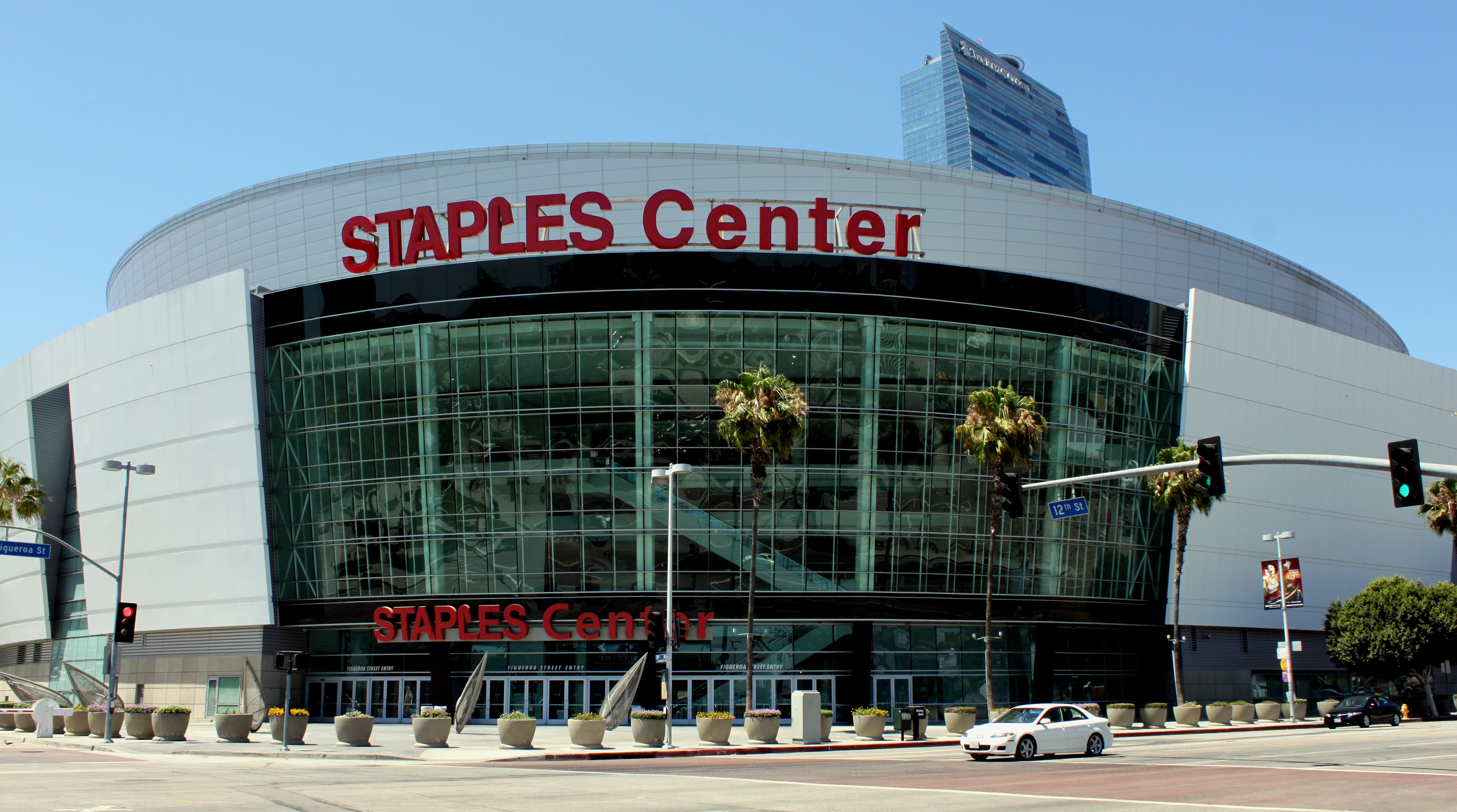
The 23rd annual SummerSlam was the second of six consecutive years for the event to be held at the Staples Center in Los Angeles, California.

SummerSlam is an annual professional wrestling pay-per-view (PPV) event produced every August by World Wrestling Entertainment (WWE) since 1988. Dubbed "The Biggest Party of the Summer", it is one of the promotion's original four pay-per-views, along with WrestleMania, Royal Rumble, and Survivor Series, referred to as the "Big Four". It has since become considered WWE's second biggest event of the year behind WrestleMania. The 23rd SummerSlam was scheduled to be held on August 15, 2010, at Staples Center in Los Angeles, California for the second consecutive year. It featured wrestlers from the Raw and SmackDown brands.

Much like the previous year's SummerSlam, WWE promoted the event with its SummerSlam Axxess fan convention. The convention was held at the Nokia Plaza in L.A. Live on August 14 and 15. THQ revealed further details of the WWE SmackDown vs. Raw 2011 video game.

=== Storylines ===
The professional wrestling matches at SummerSlam featured professional wrestlers performing as characters in scripted events pre-determined by the hosting promotion, WWE. Storylines between the characters were produced on WWE's weekly television shows Raw and SmackDown with the Raw and SmackDown brands—storyline divisions in which WWE assigned its employees to different programs.

The main rivalry heading into SummerSlam from the Raw brand was between the champion Sheamus and Randy Orton over the WWE Championship. On the July 19 episode of Raw, Orton defeated Edge and Chris Jericho in a triple threat match to become the number one contender for Sheamus's WWE Championship at SummerSlam. On the August 9 episode of Raw, the anonymous Raw general manager added two stipulations to the match, stating that anyone who interfered in this match would be suspended indefinitely and if Orton lost, he would not receive another match for the championship for as long as Sheamus is champion.

The main rivalry heading into SummerSlam from the SmackDown brand was between the champion Kane and Rey Mysterio over the World Heavyweight Championship. On the May 28 episode of SmackDown, Kane's storyline brother The Undertaker defeated Mysterio to qualify for the fatal four-way match for the World Heavyweight Championship at the Fatal 4-Way pay-per view in June. During the match however, The Undertaker suffered a legitimate injury, forcing him to be written out of the match by having him found in a "vegetative state" by Kane over Memorial Day weekend. As a result, Kane accused several wrestlers of incapacitating his brother and attacked them. Mysterio won a battle royal to replace The Undertaker by last eliminating Kane, and went on to defeat the defending champion Jack Swagger, Big Show and CM Punk at Fatal 4-Way to win his second World Heavyweight Championship. At Money in the Bank, Kane won a Money in the Bank ladder match and cashed in his championship opportunity on Mysterio later that night, after Mysterio had defeated Swagger to retain. Kane defeated Mysterio to win his first World Heavyweight Championship. On the July 23 episode of SmackDown, Mysterio defeated Swagger in a two-out-of-three falls match to earn a rematch against Kane for the World Heavyweight Championship at SummerSlam. On the July 30 episode of SmackDown, Kane revealed that The Undertaker had disclosed that his attacker was Mysterio, and vowed to get revenge.

Another main rivalry from Raw featured The Nexus, a stable consisting of former NXT rookies led by the season's winner Wade Barrett, against 'Team WWE', led by John Cena. The Nexus made their debut as a collective unit on the June 7 episode of Raw, attacking Cena, CM Punk, and members of the ringside crew, on the pretext of demanding guaranteed WWE contracts for all of them. The following week on Raw, the then-General Manager Bret Hart refused and as a result, The Nexus attacked and incapacitated him, forcing WWE Chairman Vince McMahon to appoint a new, anonymous General Manager, who ultimately signed all members of The Nexus to the show. The Nexus continued to frequently attack various WWE wrestlers, crew, and legends to display their dominance, although they focused mainly on Cena, costing him the WWE Championship twice at Fatal 4-Way and Money in the Bank. On the July 19 episode of Raw, Cena confronted The Nexus, who offered him a place in their stable, which he refused and instead revealed that he had assembled a team, christened 'Team WWE' (consisting of Cena himself, Edge, Chris Jericho, John Morrison, R-Truth, The Great Khali, and Bret Hart), to face The Nexus in a seven-on-seven tag team match at SummerSlam. On the July 26 episode of Raw, the anonymous general manager changed the match to an elimination format. Following dissension on Cena's team in the next few weeks, Edge and Jericho left the SummerSlam match on the August 2 episode of Raw. They rejoined the following week, however, when The Nexus tried to attack the members of Team WWE and Edge and Jericho. On the same episode, Khali was attacked by The Nexus, removing him from the match at SummerSlam. The Miz offered his services to the team as Khali's substitute, ultimately saying that he would reveal his final decision at SummerSlam itself.

Another rivalry from the SmackDown brand pitted Big Show against The Straight Edge Society, a stable preaching the hardlined straight edge lifestyle, led by CM Punk and consisting of Luke Gallows, Joey Mercury and Serena. In May, at the Over the Limit pay-per-view, Punk lost a match to Rey Mysterio, forcing Punk to have his head shaved bald as a result of the stipulation. In order to conceal his baldness, Punk started wearing a mask until Big Show forcibly removed it on the July 16 episode of SmackDown. In attempt to avenge Punk's humiliation, the Straight Edge Society's masked "mystery man" faced Big Show in a match, but had his own mask removed during the match, revealing him to be Joey Mercury. On the July 30 episode of SmackDown, the Straight Edge Society attacked Big Show and repeatedly stomped his right hand into the steel ring steps. The following week, it was announced that the Straight Edge Society would be facing Big Show in a three-on-one handicap match at SummerSlam.

Another rivalry from the Raw brand was between the champion Alicia Fox and Melina over the WWE Divas Championship. In December 2009, Melina tore her ACL at a live event, which caused her to vacate the Divas Championship. At Fatal 4-Way in June, Fox won the title in a fatal four-way match against Maryse, Gail Kim and defending champion Eve, and retained the championship against Eve at Money in the Bank. On the August 2 episode of Raw, Melina made her return and attacked Fox. The following week on Raw, Melina defeated Fox in a non-title match and was rewarded with a title opportunity at the Divas Championship at SummerSlam.

== Event ==
Other on-screen personnel
Role:	Name:
English commentators	Michael Cole
English commentators	Jerry Lawler
English commentators	Matt Striker
Spanish commentators	Carlos Cabrera
Spanish commentators	Hugo Savinovich
Backstage interviewer	Josh Mathews
Ring announcers	Justin Roberts
Ring announcers	Tony Chimel
Referees	Charles Robinson
Referees	Mike Chioda
Referees	John Cone
Referees	Jack Doan
Referees	Chad Patton

=== Preliminary matches ===
The actual pay-per-view opened with Dolph Ziggler defending the WWE Intercontinental Championship against Kofi Kingston. The match ended in a no-contest after The Nexus attacked both competitors.

Next, Alicia Fox defended the Divas Championship against Melina. Melina executed a snapmare driver on Fox to win the title. Post match, co-Women's Champions LayCool (Layla and Michelle McCool) attacked Melina.

After that, The Straight Edge Society (CM Punk, Joey Mercury and Luke Gallows) faced Big Show in a handicap match. In the end, Big Show delivered a KO Punch to Gallows and delivered a chokeslam to Mercury onto Gallows, pinning Mercury to win the match.

=== Main event matches ===
In the fourth match, Sheamus faced Randy Orton for the WWE Championship in a last chance match, with the stipulations being that anyone who interfered in the match would be suspended indefinitely along with if Orton lost, he would never get another shot at the title as long as Sheamus is champion. In the climax, Sheamus performed a Brogue Kick on Orton for a near-fall. Sheamus retrieved a steel chair and fought with the referee over the chair, resulting in Orton winning by disqualification. After the match, Orton attacked Sheamus with a low-blow and performed an RKO on the broadcast table on Sheamus.

In the fifth match, Kane faced Rey Mysterio for the World Heavyweight Championship. The match ended when Kane performed a chokeslam on Mysterio to retain the title. After the match, Kane attempted to put Mysterio in a casket, but The Undertaker was revealed to be inside the casket. Kane delivered a Tombstone Piledriver to Undertaker.

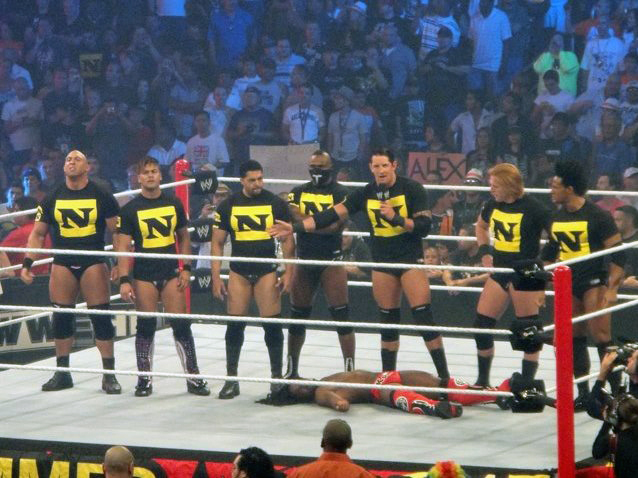
The Nexus at SummerSlam.

In the main event, The Nexus faced Team WWE in a 7-on-7 elimination tag team match. Before the match started, Daniel Bryan was announced as the seventh member of Team WWE. In the climax of the match, after every other member of Team WWE had been eliminated, Barrett delivered a DDT to Cena onto the concrete floor and scored a near-fall. Cena eliminated Gabriel after Gabriel missed a 450º splash. Cena then eliminated Barrett with the STF, giving his team the win.

== Reception ==
Overall, the event received mixed-to-negative reviews from critics, who praised the quality of the main event match (although panning the finish) while panning the remainder of the event.

Bleacher Report's Andre Harrison rated the event 5 out of 10, calling it a "one match show" (referring to the 7-on-7 tag team match as the only good match in the event), although stating that "WWE dropped the ball huge" on the finish. Scott Slimmer of 411Mania rated the event 2.75 out of 5.

== Aftermath ==
The next night on Raw, the anonymous general manager of Raw announced that members of The Nexus would face off against members of Team WWE in a series of matches throughout the evening. In order to find the "weak links" of the group, The Nexus's leader, Wade Barrett, declared that anyone in The Nexus who lost their match would be excommunicated from the group. Ultimately, each Nexus member won their match except for Darren Young, who lost to John Cena by submission. After the match, the remaining six members brutally attacked Young, symbolizing his banishment from The Nexus.

According to Chris Jericho and Edge, the original plan steered toward a victory for The Nexus. However, John Cena asked for the finish to be changed, which Jericho felt affected The Nexus's momentum. Nexus members Heath Slater, Darren Young, David Otunga and Michael Tarver have also shared similar sentiments. Cena has since admitted that his decision was wrong.

The following year in April 2011, the promotion ceased using its full name with the "WWE" abbreviation becoming an orphaned initialism.

== Results ==
No.	Results	Stipulations	Times
1^{D}	Evan Bourne defeated Zack Ryder by pinfall	Singles match	—
2	Dolph Ziggler (c) (with Vickie Guerrero) vs. Kofi Kingston ended in a no contest	Singles match for the WWE Intercontinental Championship	07:05
3	Melina defeated Alicia Fox (c) by pinfall	Singles match for the WWE Divas Championship	05:20
4	Big Show defeated The Straight Edge Society (CM Punk, Joey Mercury, and Luke Gallows) (with Serena) by pinfall	Handicap match	06:45
5	Randy Orton defeated Sheamus (c) by disqualification	Last Chance match for the WWE Championship; If anyone interfered in the match they would have been suspended indefinitely.	18:55
6	Kane (c) defeated Rey Mysterio by pinfall	Singles match for the World Heavyweight Championship	13:31
7	Team WWE (John Cena, John Morrison, R-Truth, Bret Hart, Edge, Chris Jericho, and Daniel Bryan) defeated The Nexus (Wade Barrett, David Otunga, Justin Gabriel, Heath Slater, Darren Young, Skip Sheffield, and Michael Tarver)	7-on-7 Elimination tag team match	35:19
(c) / – the champion(s) heading into the match; D / – this was a dark match

=== 7-on-7 elimination tag eliminations ===
Elimination	Wrestler	Team	Eliminated by	Elimination method	Time
1	Darren Young	Nexus	Daniel Bryan	Submitted to the LeBell Lock	00:42
2	Michael Tarver	Nexus	John Morrison	Pinned after the Starship Pain	03:36
3	John Morrison	WWE	Skip Sheffield	Pinned after a lariat	07:32
4	R-Truth	WWE	Skip Sheffield	Pinned after a lariat	07:59
5	Bret Hart	WWE	N/A	Disqualified for hitting Sheffield with a steel chair	12:08
6	Skip Sheffield	Nexus	Edge	Pinned after a Codebreaker by Jericho and a spear	13:13
7	David Otunga	Nexus	Chris Jericho	Submitted to the Walls of Jericho	19:13
8	Chris Jericho	WWE	Heath Slater	Pinned after the Sweetness	20:05
9	Edge	WWE	Heath Slater	Pinned by a Roll up	20:38
10	Heath Slater	Nexus	Daniel Bryan	Submitted to the LeBell Lock	29:02
11	Daniel Bryan	WWE	Wade Barrett	Pinned after The Miz hit Bryan with the Money in the Bank briefcase	29:32
12	Justin Gabriel	Nexus	John Cena	Pinned after Gabriel missed a 450° splash	34:50
13	Wade Barrett	Nexus	John Cena	Submitted to the STF	35:15
Winner:	John Cena (Team WWE)				
