= Justin Roberts =

Professional wrestling ring announcer

- Roberts in August 2026

Personal information
- Born: Justin Jason Roberts; December 29, 1979 (age 46) Chicago, Illinois, U.S.

Professional wrestling career
- Ring name(s): Enzo Reed; Jae Sage; Jason Roberts; Justin Roberts; Justin Price; The Dapper Yapper
- Billed height: 5 ft 10 in (1.78 m)
- Billed weight: 170 lb (77 kg)
- Billed from: Scottsdale, Arizona
- Debut: November 1, 1996

Justin Jason Roberts (born December 29, 1979) is an American ring announcer. He is signed to All Elite Wrestling, (AEW). He is also known for his time in Raw WWE Brand (WWE), where he regularly announced for its pay-per-views and television shows such as WrestleMania, Raw, SmackDown, ECW, and Superstars from 2002 to October 13, 2014

== Career ==
=== Early career (1996–2002) ===
Roberts began watching professional wrestling after he saw an edition of Saturday Night's Main Event and met Kerry Von Erich and Ultimate Warrior at a hotel in Wisconsin. The combined events inspired Roberts to become a fan of wrestling. He also briefly trained as a referee so he could be in the same ring as Curt Hennig, of whom he was a big fan.

Roberts began ring announcing at age 16 for local professional wrestling promotion Pro Wrestling International, and announced his first match in November 1996. While studying Media Arts and Communications at the University of Arizona from 1998 to 2002, Roberts worked for other independent promotions such as the American Wrestling Alliance, All Pro Wrestling, and Impact Zone Wrestling. During this time, he also announced for the Toughman Contest.

=== World Wrestling Entertainment/WWE (2002–2014) ===
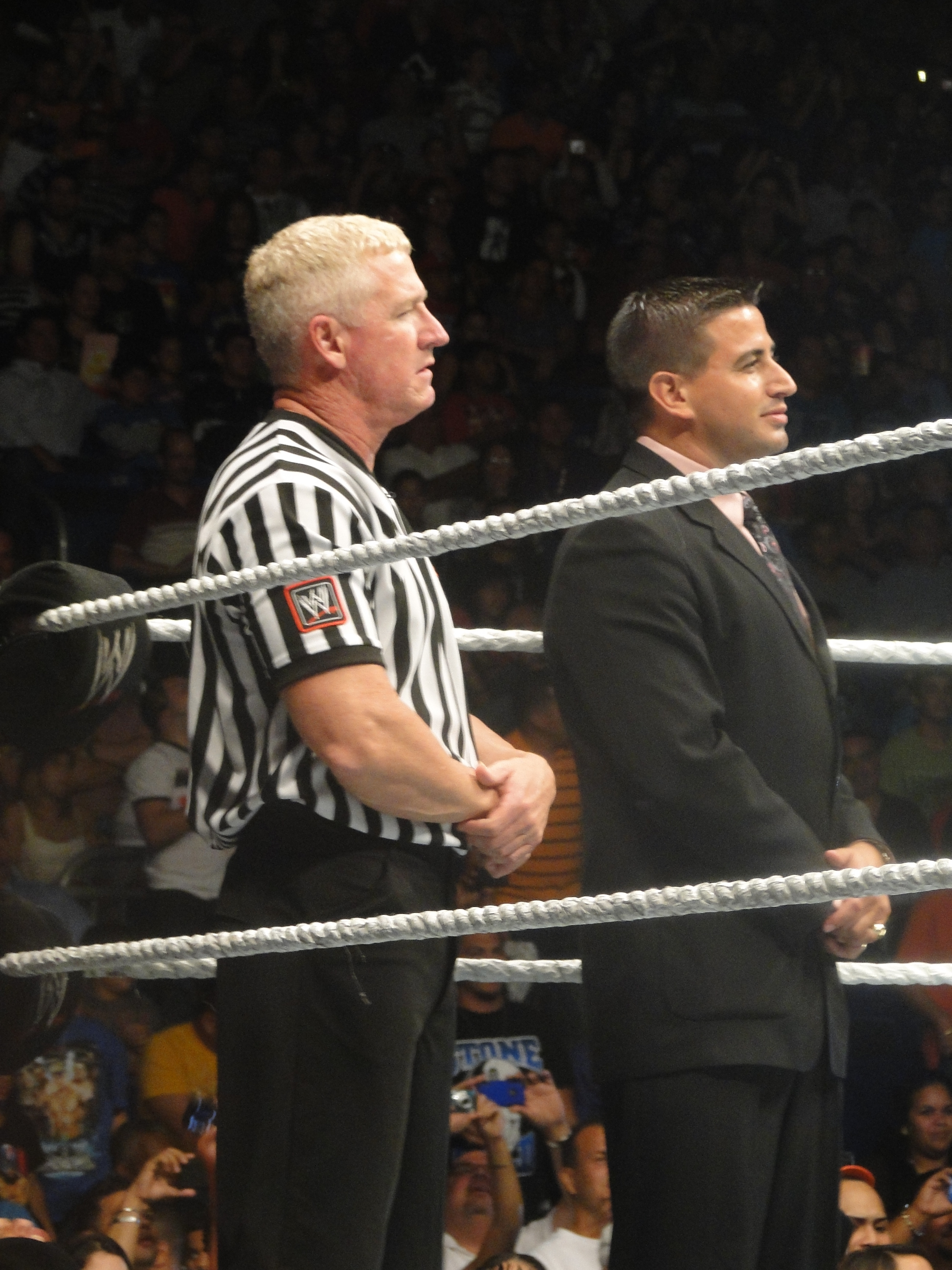
Roberts (right) with referee Scott Armstrong in 2011

In 2002, Roberts joined WWE and joined SmackDown!, followed later by a move to the Raw brand. He also worked on Velocity and Heat shows while touring as the full-time Raw live event announcer. Most notably, Roberts announced the ECW show each week on the Sci Fi Network until September 2007, before swapping with SmackDown!'s Tony Chimel. Roberts achieved a career high point when he announced the main event of WrestleMania XXIV between Edge and The Undertaker on March 30, 2008. In addition to announcing SmackDown and pay-per-view matches, Roberts would also announce on WWE Superstars, including its inaugural episode on April 16, 2009. Beginning on September 28, 2009, Roberts took over the Raw announcing duties, replacing the departing Lilian Garcia.

On the June 7, 2010 episode of Raw, Roberts was attacked by the Nexus stable who had competed in the first season of NXT and was called up to the main roster the same day. During the segment, Roberts was strangled with his own tie by Daniel Bryan, which led to Bryan's release, as WWE felt the incident was too violent for their TV-PG programming. At the SummerSlam pay-per-view two months later however, Bryan returned to WWE. At WrestleMania XXVII, Roberts worked as the sole announcer for the whole show, with the exception of the announcement of the Hall of Fame class of 2011, which was announced by Howard Finkel.

On October 13, 2014, immediately after Raw, WWE released Roberts after opting not to renew his contract, ending his 12-year tenure with the company. Following his release, it was reported that Roberts would be working on an autobiography. In the days leading up to his release, Roberts had publicly penned a five-page essay explaining why the WWE had been the “most incredible blessing of [his] life”.

=== Independent circuit (2014–2025) ===
Roberts was guest ring announcer at the House of Hardcore 9 event and a couple of other events soon after leaving WWE. In 2016, Roberts was the ring announcer for the UR Fight iPPV Events which included his announcing for a match between Kurt Angle and Rey Mysterio.

On July 13, 2018, it was announced Roberts would commentate the All In broadcast with Don Callis, Sean Mooney, Excalibur, Alicia Atout, Ian Riccaboni, and Bobby Cruise. Roberts and Cruise were the ring announcers at All In.

=== All Elite Wrestling (2019–present) ===
On April 3, 2019, Roberts was hired by All Elite Wrestling (AEW) as its main ring announcer, nicknamed "The Dapper Yapper".

=== Other ===
In 2023 Roberts started announcing for the MMA promotion Professional Fighters League.

Since 2015, Roberts has worked for the band Tool hosting and moderating their VIP events.

== Other media ==
Roberts has appeared as a non-player character in the video games WWE SmackDown vs. Raw 2008, WWE SmackDown vs. Raw 2009, WWE SmackDown vs. Raw 2010, WWE SmackDown vs. Raw 2011, WWE '12, WWE '13, WWE 2K14, and WWE 2K15.

Roberts has appeared in Graves and The Messengers. He has also done some acting and was featured in such movies as Stuart Saves His Family, The Guardian and Soul Food. As a child, he was an extra in Sleepless in Seattle, Blue Chips and Only the Lonely. He also appeared in an episode of The Jerry Springer Show.

Roberts released his autobiography, Best Seat in the House, on April 1, 2017.
