= Divas of Doom =

Professional wrestling tag team

The Divas of Doom
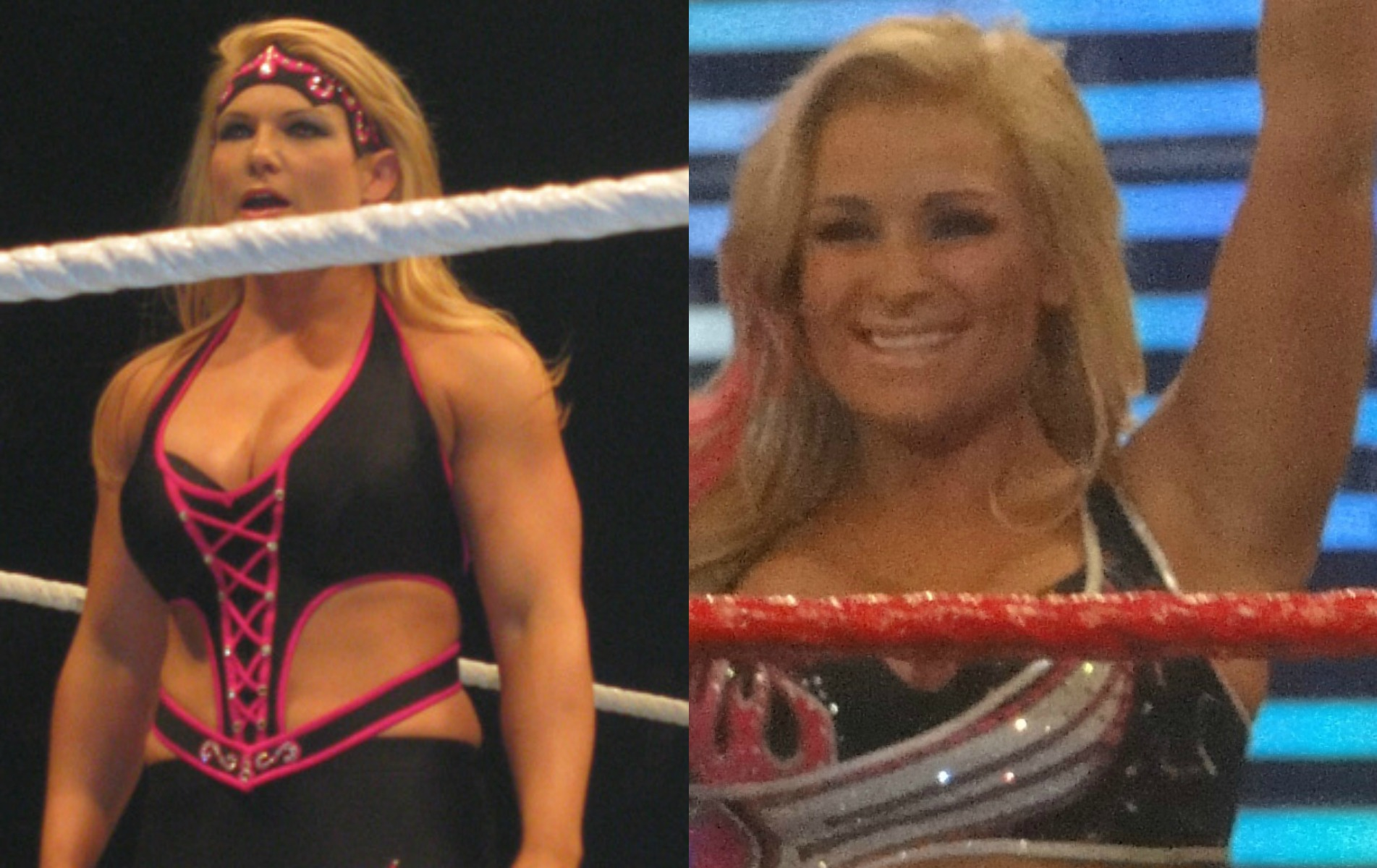
- Phoenix (left) and Natalya (right)

Statistics
- Members: Natalya; Beth Phoenix
- Name(s): Beth Phoenix and Natalya; The Divas of Doom
- Billed heights: Beth Phoenix: 5 ft 7 in (1.70 m); Natalya: 5 ft 5 in (1.65 m)
- Combined billed weight: 285 lb (129 kg); Natalya (135 lb); Beth Phoenix (150 lb)
- Debut: August 12, 2011
- Disbanded: May 12, 2019
- Years active: 2010–2012; 2019

Natalya and Beth Phoenix, also known as The Divas of Doom, was a professional wrestling tag team in WWE on the Raw brand. Phoenix and Natalya first began teaming together when the latter was Divas Champion and was feuding with LayCool in late September 2010. In August 2011, both women turned heel, and developed the character of anti-Divas, who were violently opposed to the acceptance of "cute", "perky", "Barbie doll" women in the company. Their slogan of "Pin-Up Strong" was also the name of their submission maneuver. Phoenix retired from wrestling in 2012, but came out of retirement in 2019 to reform her tag team with Natalya and challenge for the WWE Women's Tag Team Championship at WrestleMania 35.

== History ==
=== Original run (2010–2012) ===
In late 2010, following the split of Natalya's stable The Hart Dynasty, Natalya set her sights on LayCool (Michelle McCool and Layla) and the Divas Championship. After coming up short twice due to LayCool's machinations, Natalya finally defeated the duo in a handicap match for the Divas Championship at Survivor Series. She was attacked after the match by LayCool, but Beth Phoenix, returning from an injury she'd suffered in May which was credited to LayCool, made the save and then congratulated Natalya. From there, the two formed an alliance against LayCool, and at TLC: Tables, Ladders & Chairs in December, Phoenix and Natalya defeated Lay-Cool in the first Divas tag team tables match in WWE history. The alliance quietly ended a month later when Natayla lost the Divas Championship to Eve Torres at Royal Rumble, and went back to competing exclusively on the Raw brand.

On the August 1, 2011, episode of Raw, both women competed in a battle royal to determinate who would receive a Divas Championship match against Kelly Kelly at SummerSlam. Phoenix won the match, then turned villainous by attacking Kelly, and stated "[her] days as the perky, cute, blonde little bimbo are officially over." Four days later on SmackDown, Natalya defeated her protégé AJ Lee, and afterwards attacked AJ before pledging an alliance with Phoenix, telling her that she agreed with her in that "the days of the cute perky little princesses are over". Phoenix and Natalya officially debuted together as "The Divas of Doom" on the August 12 episode of SmackDown, defeating AJ Lee and Kaitlyn, who they continued to assault after the match.

Natalya then accompanied Phoenix to her Divas Championship match at SummerSlam against Kelly Kelly, who was accompanied by Eve Torres, but she failed to win the match. On the September 5 episode of Raw, Phoenix defeated Eve Torres to earn another title shot at Night of Champions, where she again lost. On the September 19 episode of Raw, the Divas of Doom lost a tag team match to Kelly Kelly and Eve Torres after Eve pinned Natalya for the win. On the September 26 episode of Raw, Phoenix pinned Kelly Kelly in a tag team match to earn another title shot at Hell in a Cell. On the September 30 edition of SmackDown, Natalya lost a match to Kelly. Following the match, Phoenix jumped into the ring and delivered a Glam Slam to Kelly, then Natalya applied their new submission, Pin-Up Strong, making Kelly Kelly scream and cry in pain. At Hell in a Cell, Phoenix defeated Kelly Kelly with help from Natalya, winning her first Divas Championship. At Vengeance, Phoenix defeated Eve to retain the Divas Championship. At Survivor Series, Natalya accompanied Phoenix to a successful lumberjill Divas Championship match against Eve Torres.

On January 29, 2012 at Royal Rumble, the Divas of Doom competed in an eight-woman tag team match alongside The Bella Twins, and defeated the team of Eve Torres, Kelly Kelly, Alicia Fox, and Tamina. The next night on the January 30 episode of Raw, Phoenix successfully defended her Divas Championship against Eve. At Elimination Chamber, Phoenix successfully defended her championship against Tamina. On the March 22 episode of Superstars, Phoenix and Natalya appeared on opposite sides of a tag team match in which Phoenix teamed with Eve Torres against Natalya and Tamina, with Phoenix's team winning the match. Afterwards, Phoenix and Natalya would not team up again until the July 12 episode of Superstars, where there were defeated by Alicia Fox and Kaitlyn. At Money in the Bank, they teamed up with Torres, being defeated by Layla, Kaitlyn and Tamina. On the September 28 episode of SmackDown, Phoenix and Natalya faced each other in a match, in which Phoenix came out victorious. After the match they both shook hands, but Torres, who in-storyline was by then was in a position of authority, appeared to suspend Phoenix accusing her of being the mysterious attacker of Kaitlyn, since the attacker was blonde. Phoenix in turn accused Natalya, saying that she was also blonde, and Phoenix and Natalya ended up arguing in the ring. Soon afterwards, Phoenix left WWE.

=== Reunion (2019–2020) ===
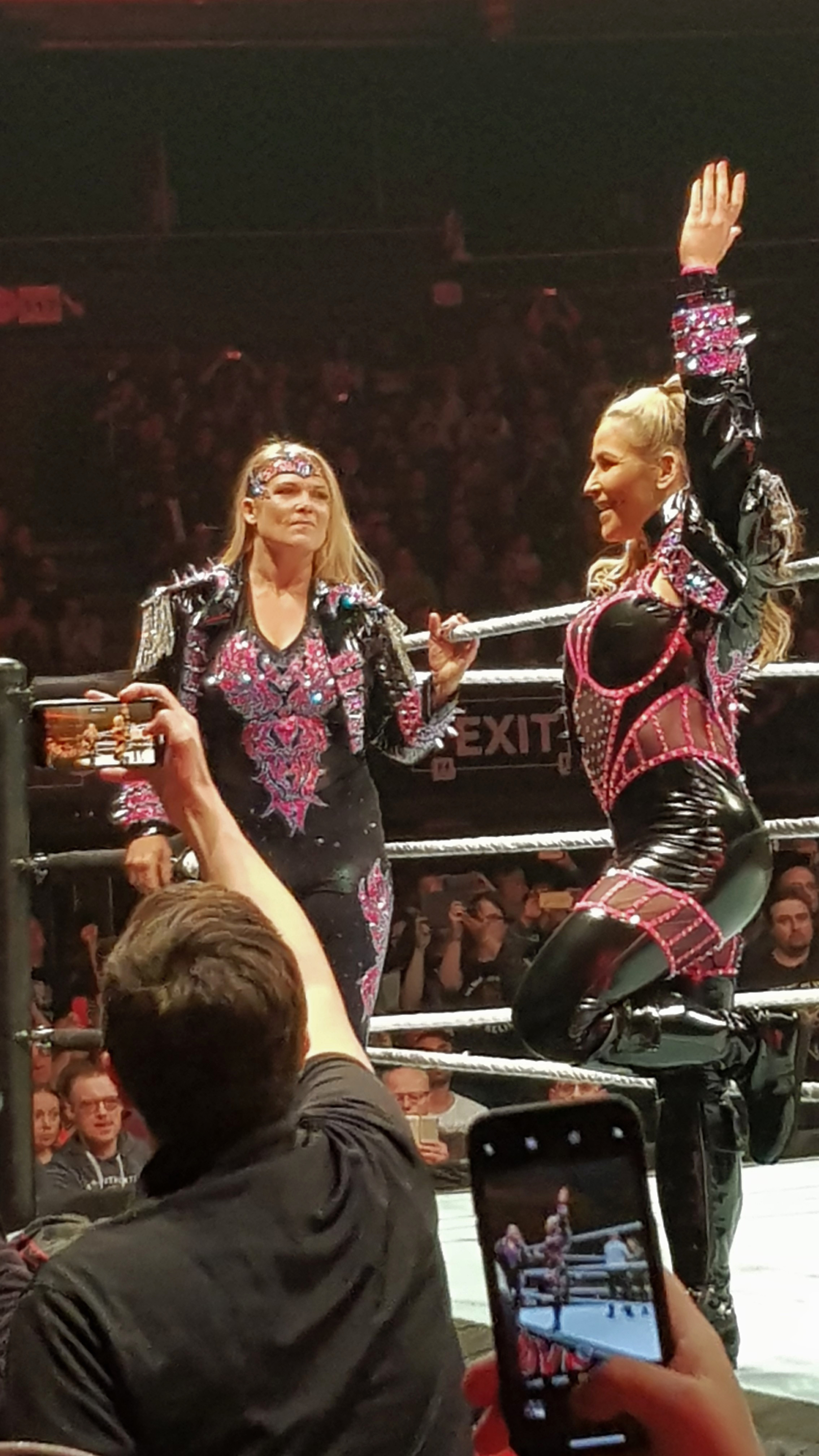
The Divas of Doom in May 2019

The team had a brief reunion when Natalya inducted Phoenix into the 2017 WWE Hall of Fame, and again at the 2018 Royal Rumble, where Natalya eliminated Phoenix in the first ever 30-woman Royal Rumble match. On March 10, 2019 at Fastlane, Phoenix was attacked by Tamina and Nia Jax, after which Natalya came to defend her, but also ended up being attacked by the duo. On the March 18, 2019 episode of Raw, Phoenix announced that she was coming out of retirement; she and Natalya reformed their team and challenged The Boss 'n' Hug Connection (Bayley and Sasha Banks) for the WWE Women's Tag Team Championship at WrestleMania 35; however, later that night Tamina and Jax once again ambushed Phoenix after a distraction from Jax during a one-on-one match between Natalya and Banks. On the March 25, 2019, episode of Raw, it was announced that Phoenix and Natalya would compete in a fatal four-way match at WrestleMania 35 against The Boss 'n' Hug Connection, Jax and Tamina, and The IIconics (Billie Kay and Peyton Royce), but they did not manage to win at the event, being the latter team the winners. Natalya and Phoenix did the 2019 Raw European Tour together as their tag, The Divas of Doom. The pair went against The Riott's Squad, Ruby Riott and Liv Morgan. They won all of their matches and usually ended them with matching sharpshooters. The pair reunited once again at the 2020 Women's Royal Rumble, which saw Phoenix enter at #19 while Natalya entered at #23. Both women reached the final four, after which Phoenix eliminated Natalya before she was eliminated herself by Shayna Baszler.

== Championships and accomplishments ==
- Pro Wrestling Illustrated
  - PWI ranked Beth Phoenix No. 2 of the top 50 female wrestlers in the PWI Female 50 in 2012
  - PWI ranked Natalya No. 4 of the top 50 female wrestlers in the PWI Female 50 in 2011
- WWE
  - WWE Divas Championship (2 time) – Natalya (1) and Beth Phoenix (1)
