= Survivor Series (2009) =

World Wrestling Entertainment pay-per-view event

- Promotional poster featuring D-Generation X (Shawn Michaels and Triple H)
- Promotion: World Wrestling Entertainment
- Brand(s): Raw; SmackDown; ECW
- Date: November 22, 2009
- City: Washington, D.C.
- Venue: Verizon Center
- Attendance: 12,500
- Buy rate: 225,000

Pay-per-view chronology
← Previous; Bragging Rights	Next → TLC: Tables, Ladders & Chairs

Survivor Series chronology
← Previous; 2008	Next → 2010

The 2009 Survivor Series was a professional wrestling pay-per-view (PPV) event produced by World Wrestling Entertainment (WWE). It was the 23rd annual Survivor Series and took place on November 22, 2009, at the Verizon Center in Washington, D.C., held for wrestlers from the promotion's Raw, SmackDown, and ECW brand divisions. The event centered on the Survivor Series match, a tag team elimination match that pits teams of multiple wrestlers against each other.

The card comprised six matches. There were two matches that were deemed the main events of the program. The first was the triple threat match involving The Undertaker defending SmackDown's World Heavyweight Championship successfully against both halves of the Unified WWE Tag Team Champions, Chris Jericho and Big Show. This was also followed by the other main event: another triple-threat match with John Cena defending Raw's WWE Championship against Triple H and Shawn Michaels. The undercard matches included Batista versus Rey Mysterio in a singles match and three traditional Survivor Series matches.

The event received 225,000 pay-per-view buys, down from the previous year's event of 319,000 buys. This was the final Survivor Series to feature the ECW brand and the ECW Championship in any capacity as the brand was dissolved in February 2010, deactivating the championship along with it.

== Production ==
=== Background ===
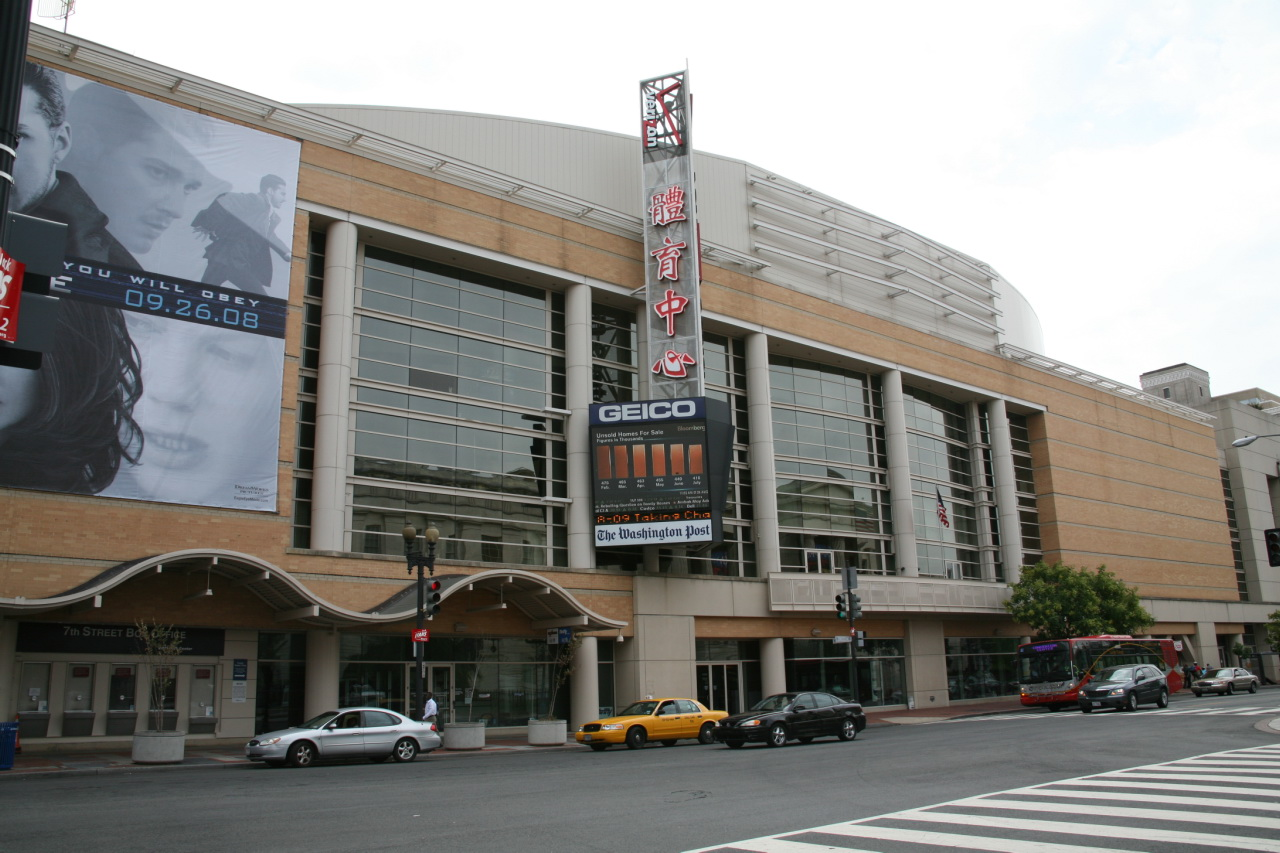
The 23rd annual Survivor Series was held at the Verizon Center in Washington, D.C.

Survivor Series is an annual professional wrestling pay-per-view (PPV) event, produced every November by World Wrestling Entertainment (WWE) since 1987, generally held around Thanksgiving in the United States. In what has become the second longest-running pay-per-view event in history (behind WWE's WrestleMania), it is one of the promotion's original four pay-per-views, along with WrestleMania, SummerSlam, and Royal Rumble, referred to as the "Big Four". The event is traditionally characterized by having Survivor Series matches, which are tag team elimination matches that typically pits teams of four or five wrestlers against each other. The 23rd Survivor Series was scheduled to be held on November 22, 2009, at the Verizon Center in Washington, D.C., and featured wrestlers from the Raw, SmackDown, and ECW brand divisions.

=== Storylines ===
The professional wrestling matches at Survivor Series involved professional wrestlers in scripted events pre-determined by the hosting promotion, WWE. Storylines between the characters were produced on WWE's weekly television shows Raw, SmackDown, and ECW.

On the October 26 episode of Raw the show's guest hosts, Kyle Busch and Joey Logano scheduled the Raw brand's main event, in which John Cena was to defend the WWE Championship against both members of D-Generation X, Triple H and Shawn Michaels, in a triple threat match.

At Bragging Rights, a seven-on-seven tag team match pitting contingencies of Raw wrestlers against SmackDown wrestlers was held, with the winning team declared the dominant brand. Near the end of the match, Raw wrestler, and one-half of the Unified WWE Tag Team Champions, Big Show, turned on his team, allowing the other half, Chris Jericho, to score the victory for SmackDown. The following night on Raw, Big Show revealed that he turned on Team Raw as a favor from SmackDown general manager, Theodore Long, who in return would grant him a World Heavyweight Championship shot at Survivor Series against The Undertaker. On the October 30 episode of SmackDown, both Jericho and Kane expressed a desire to face The Undertaker at Survivor Series instead of The Big Show. Long decided to change the World Heavyweight Championship match into a Triple Threat match, with the third person being the winner of a match between Jericho and Kane. Jericho won the match to earn his spot at Survivor Series.

Following the fatal four-way match for the World Heavyweight Championship at Bragging Rights, two of the match's participants, Rey Mysterio and Batista, had a confrontation rooted in Batista's perception of Mysterio holding him back from winning the championship, promptly having the latter turn on his ally, and assault him. After failing to reason with him, a match between the two was scheduled on the November 6 episode of SmackDown.

For the event, three traditional Survivor Series elimination matches were scheduled: The first pitted teams headed by WWE Intercontinental Champion John Morrison and WWE United States Champion The Miz against each other. Their partnership had ended when The Miz betrayed his partner, leading to verbal jabs via their Internet show, The Dirt Sheet, as well as a match at Bragging Rights, in which The Miz was victorious. Morrison's team included Shelton Benjamin, Evan Bourne, Finlay, and Matt Hardy while The Miz enlisted Drew McIntyre, Sheamus, Jack Swagger, and Dolph Ziggler.

The second Survivor Series match pitted Randy Orton, who enlisted his protégés Ted DiBiase and Cody Rhodes (collectively known as The Legacy), as well as CM Punk and William Regal, against Kofi Kingston's team, which also included ECW Champion Christian, Mark Henry, Montel Vontavious Porter (MVP), and R-Truth. The conflict between Orton and Kingston rooted in their involvement in each other's matches over the previous weeks and Kingston defacing Orton's car.

The third Survivor Series match consisted of the women of the company. WWE Women's Champion Michelle McCool teamed with Alicia Fox, Jillian Hall, Layla, and Beth Phoenix; the opposing team, captained by Mickie James, included Kelly Kelly, Gail Kim, WWE Divas Champion Melina, and Eve Torres.

== Event ==
Other on-screen personnel
Role:	Name:
English commentators	Michael Cole
English commentators	Jerry Lawler
English commentators	Matt Striker
Spanish commentators	Carlos Cabrera
Spanish commentators	Hugo Savinovich
Interviewer	Josh Mathews
Ring announcers	Tony Chimel
Ring announcers	Justin Roberts
Referees	Charles Robinson
Referees	John Cone
Referees	Mike Chioda
Referees	Jack Doan
Referees	Scott Armstrong
Referees	Jim Korderas
Referees	Justin King
Referees	Aaron Mahoney

Prior to Survivor Series airing live on pay-per-view, the fans in attendance were presented with an untelevised match pitting Santino Marella against Chavo Guerrero, which saw Marella get the pinfall victory.

=== Preliminary matches ===
The event commenced with Team Miz (The Miz, Drew McIntyre, Sheamus, Dolph Ziggler, and Jack Swagger) facing Team Morrison (John Morrison, Matt Hardy, Evan Bourne, Shelton Benjamin, and Finlay). Ziggler was eliminated by Bourne after an Air Bourne. Bourne was eliminated by McIntyre after a Future Shock. Finlay was eliminated by Sheamus after a Brogue Kick. Swagger was eliminated by Morrison after a Starship Pain. Benjamin was eliminated by The Miz after a Skull Crushing Finale. Hardy was eliminated by McIntyre after a Future Shock. Morrison was eliminated by Sheamus after a High Cross, leaving The Miz, McIntyre and Sheamus as the survivors.

Next, Batista faced Rey Mysterio. The match started with Mysterio trying to hit quick attacks before Batista took Mysterio outside of the ring to the floor of the arena, which saw him throw Mysterio into one of the posts of the ring. As the action returned to the ring, Batista went to execute his finishing move, the Batista Bomb, only to be stopped as his opponent escaped and threw him to the outside. With Batista outside again, Mysterio ran across the ring apron, and dove out at Batista with a seated senton. As the two once again made their way into the ring, Mysterio dropped Batista into the ropes as he executed the 619. As Mysterio went to pin Batista, Batista evaded the attempt, leading to Mysterio ascending the top turnbuckle and attempted a frog splash; Batista blocked the attack, and performed the Batista Bomb onto his opponent three times, causing the referee to stop the match thus declaring him the winner via knockout. Batista then placed a chair in the ring and then performed a spinebuster to Mysterio onto the chair before the medical staff took him out on a stretcher.

The third match was a five-on-five Elimination Tag Team match between Team Kingston (Kofi Kingston, Montel Vontavious Porter, Mark Henry, R-Truth, and Christian) and Team Orton (Randy Orton, Cody Rhodes, Ted DiBiase, CM Punk, and William Regal). Henry was eliminated by Orton after an RKO. R-Truth was eliminated by Punk after a Go To Sleep. DiBiase was eliminated by Christian after a Diving Sunset Flip. William Regal was eliminated by MVP after a Drive-By Kick. MVP was eliminated by Rhodes after Cross Rhodes. Rhodes was eliminated by Christian after a Killswitch. Christian was eliminated by Orton after an RKO. Punk was eliminated by Kingston with a Roll Up. Orton was eliminated by Kingston after Trouble in Paradise, leaving Kingston as the sole survivor.

=== Main event matches ===
The fourth match was a triple threat match for the World Heavyweight Championship between The Undertaker, Chris Jericho, and Big Show. During the match, Jericho and Big Show double-teamed The Undertaker. The Undertaker managed to remove Big Show from the ring and began to focus on Chris Jericho. Jericho countered The Undertaker's Old School rope walk and turned it into a superplex, giving him a brief advantage where he was able to apply the Walls of Jericho to The Undertaker. At this point Big Show returned to the ring and attacked Jericho with a chokeslam, freeing The Undertaker from the hold, but his attempt to do the same to The Undertaker was countered by a DDT. Jericho attempted a pin on both men but was thrown from the ring by Big Show. He retrieved the World Heavyweight Championship belt, which he attempted to use against The Undertaker but only hit Big Show with the belt. The Undertaker attempted a Last Ride on Jericho but Jericho struck The Undertaker's head with it. Jericho's failed attempt to mimic the Tombstone Piledriver on The Undertaker allowed enough distraction for Big Show to enter and punch The Undertaker in the face, leading to a pinfall attempt exchange between Jericho and Big Show on The Undertaker. When Jericho tried to retaliate for having his pinfall broken by Big Show, Big Show knocked him out but during his attempt to chokeslam The Undertaker, it was reversed into a Hell's Gate and The Undertaker scored a submission victory to retain the championship.

The fifth match was a five-on-five elimination tag team match between Team Mickie (Mickie James, Kelly Kelly, Melina, Gail Kim, and Eve Torres) and Team Michelle (Michelle McCool, Jillian Hall, Beth Phoenix, Layla, and Alicia Fox). Layla was eliminated by Kelly Kelly after a K2. Kim was eliminated by McCool after a Faith Breaker. Hall was eliminated by Eve after a Diving Sunset Flip. Eve was eliminated by Phoenix after a Glam Slam. Kelly was eliminated by Phoenix after a Glam Slam. Phoenix was eliminated by James with a Crucifix. Fox was eliminated by James after a Thesz Press. McCool was eliminated by Melina after a Last Call, leaving James and Melina as the survivors.

The final match was a triple threat match for the WWE Championship between John Cena, Triple H, and Shawn Michaels. In a show of solidarity, Triple H and Michaels entered together as D-Generation X (DX). Right after the match began, Michaels executed Sweet Chin Music on Triple H, sending him outside the ring for several minutes. During this time Michaels fought Cena ably until he attempted to send Cena through the broadcast table. At this point Cena reversed but was interrupted by a recovered Triple H. But, instead of saving Michaels, he put him through a broadcast table with a Spinebuster. Triple H then took command of the match and continued to fight Cena. Cena's attempt at an Attitude Adjustment left him open to an attack by Shawn Michaels, who had revived from going through the table. Michaels and Triple H then battled one another for a period. Cena revived but was only met with a flying forearm smash from Michaels after missing a diving leg drop, who was promptly tossed outside by Triple H. Cena applied his signature submission, the STF, to Triple H but Michaels intervened and applied a crossface to break the hold. Eventually Cena was able to put Shawn Michaels in the STF, but Michaels forced a rope break. While recovering from the STF, Michaels executed Sweet Chin Music on both Cena and Triple H, causing Triple H to collapse onto Cena in a pinning predicament. A short burst of offense from Michaels and Triple H allowed Cena to get the final advantage, finishing the match by throwing Michaels onto Triple H with the Attitude Adjustment and pinning Triple H to retain the title.

== Reception ==
Survivor Series received generally mixed to positive reviews from critics. 411mania praised the event, giving it a rating of 7.5 out of 10, with the triple threat main event match being rated 4.5 stars out of 5, the highest rated match from the event.

== Aftermath ==
=== Raw ===
After John Cena retained the WWE Championship, a 'Breakthrough battle royale' was scheduled by Raw guest host Jesse Ventura to determine the next number-one contender. The concept being that every participant was to be a superstar who had not previously won a world championship. Sheamus won the match and later on attacked Cena and slammed him through a table, Ventura who had instigated the attack decided that Cena would defend the championship in a tables match.

=== SmackDown ===
Batista, whose actions sidelined Rey Mysterio for the next few weeks, later became the number one contender for The Undertaker's World Heavyweight Championship. After a few weeks of repeatedly attacking the champion, a Chairs match for the title was scheduled.

=== Future ===
The 2009 Survivor Series was the last Survivor Series to include the ECW brand, as well as the ECW Championship, as the brand was disbanded in February 2010, deactivating the championship along with it. It was also the final Survivor Series held before the original World Tag Team Championship was deactivated in August 2010 in favor of the WWE Tag Team Championship; since WrestleMania 25 in April, both titles were held and defended together across all brands as the Unified WWE Tag Team Championship. It would also be the final Survivor Series held before the original WWE Women's Championship was deactivated in September 2010 in favor of the WWE Divas Championship.

The Survivor Series chronology was originally set to end with this 2009 event when during a press conference held on February 11, 2010, WWE Chief Executive Officer and Chairman Vince McMahon announced that WWE would drop the Survivor Series name and rebrand the event. However, following public outcry and several different fan petitions, the name was later reinstated, and in June 2010, WWE started to release tickets for the 2010 event.

== Results ==
No.	Results	Stipulations	Times
1^{D}	Santino Marella defeated Chavo Guerrero by pinfall	Singles match	—
2	Team Miz (Dolph Ziggler, Drew McIntyre, Jack Swagger, The Miz, and Sheamus) defeated Team Morrison (Evan Bourne, Finlay, John Morrison, Matt Hardy, and Shelton Benjamin)^{1}	5-on-5 Survivor Series match	20:52
3	Batista defeated Rey Mysterio by technical knockout	Singles match	06:50
4	Team Kingston (Christian, Kofi Kingston, Mark Henry, Montel Vontavious Porter, and R-Truth) defeated Team Orton (CM Punk, Cody Rhodes, Randy Orton, Ted DiBiase, and William Regal)^{2}	5-on-5 Survivor Series match	20:47
5	The Undertaker (c) defeated Big Show and Chris Jericho by submission	Triple threat match for the World Heavyweight Championship	13:37
6	Team Mickie (Eve Torres, Gail Kim, Kelly Kelly, Melina, and Mickie James) defeated Team Michelle (Alicia Fox, Beth Phoenix, Jillian Hall, Layla, and Michelle McCool)^{3}	5-on-5 Survivor Series match	10:38
7	John Cena (c) defeated Triple H and Shawn Michaels by pinfall	Triple threat match for the WWE Championship	21:19
(c) / – the champion(s) heading into the match; D / – this was a dark match

=== Survivor Series matches ===
^1

Eliminated	Wrestler	Eliminated by	Team	Method	Time
1	Dolph Ziggler	Evan Bourne	Team Miz	Air Bourne	03:54
2	Evan Bourne	Drew McIntyre	Team Morrison	Future Shock DDT	04:09
3	Finlay	Sheamus	Team Morrison	Brogue Kick	05:11
4	Jack Swagger	John Morrison	Team Miz	Starship Pain	12:05
5	Shelton Benjamin	The Miz	Team Morrison	Skull Crushing Finale	14:57
6	Matt Hardy	Drew McIntyre	Team Morrison	Future Shock DDT	17:08
7	John Morrison	Sheamus	Team Morrison	High Cross	20:52
Survivor(s):	Drew McIntyre, The Miz, and Sheamus (Team Miz)				20:52

^2

Eliminated	Wrestler	Eliminated by	Team	Method	Time
1	Mark Henry	Randy Orton	Team Kingston	RKO	00:50
2	R-Truth	CM Punk	Team Kingston	GTS	03:11
3	Ted DiBiase	Christian	Team Orton	Sunset Flip Powerbomb	05:08
4	William Regal	MVP	Team Orton	Drive-By Kick	06:49
5	MVP	Cody Rhodes	Team Kingston	Cross Rhodes	10:08
6	Cody Rhodes	Christian	Team Orton	Killswitch	11:33
7	Christian	Randy Orton	Team Kingston	RKO	13:24
8	CM Punk	Kofi Kingston	Team Orton	Roll-Up	20:39
9	Randy Orton	Kofi Kingston	Team Orton	Trouble In Paradise	20:47
Sole Survivor:	Kofi Kingston (Team Kingston)				20:47

^3

Eliminated	Wrestler	Eliminated by	Team	Method	Time
1	Layla	Kelly Kelly	Team Michelle	Pinfall	01:15
2	Gail Kim	Michelle McCool	Team Mickie	Pinfall	02:04
3	Jillian Hall	Eve Torres	Team Michelle	Pinfall	03:34
4	Eve Torres	Beth Phoenix	Team Mickie	Pinfall	03:55
5	Kelly Kelly	Beth Phoenix	Team Mickie	Pinfall	04:08
6	Beth Phoenix	Mickie James	Team Michelle	Pinfall	04:41
7	Alicia Fox	Mickie James	Team Michelle	Pinfall	06:24
8	Michelle McCool	Melina	Team Michelle	Pinfall	10:38
Survivor(s):	Melina and Mickie James (Team Mickie)				10:38
