= Notre Dame High School (Elmira, New York) =

Private coeducational school in Elmira, Chemung County, New York, United States

Location
- 1400 Maple Avenue; Elmira, Chemung County, New York 14904; United States; 42°3′46″N 76°47′15″W

Information
- Type: Private, Coeducational
- Motto: Ego Sum Lux Mundi. (I am the Light of the World.)
- Religious affiliation: Roman Catholic
- Established: 1955
- Founder: Catherine McAuley
- School district: Elmira School District
- President: Sr. Mary Walter Hickey
- Principal: Bernadette McClelland
- Chaplain: Marie McCaig
- Grades: 7-12
- Enrollment: 250 (2019)
- Average class size: 18-22
- Campus type: Suburban
- Colors: Blue and Gold
- Team name: Crusaders
- Accreditation: Middle States Association of Colleges and Schools
- Publication: Genesis
- Newspaper: Maryleaf
- Yearbook: Credo
- Website: www.notredamehighschool.com

Notre Dame High School is a private co-educational 7-12 school in Chemung County, Elmira, New York, United States. It was established in 1955 and is located within the Roman Catholic Diocese of Rochester.

== Athletics ==
Notre Dame competes in Section IV of the New York State Public High School Athletic Association.

=== Baseball ===
Notre Dame won the Class C State Championship in 1997.

=== Softball ===
The Lady Crusaders won the Class C State Championship in 2011 and 2016.

=== Boys Basketball ===
Notre Dame's boys basketball won the Class A State Championship in 1978.

=== Girls Basketball ===
The girls' basketball team won the Class C State Championship in 2006 and 2007.

=== Boys Soccer ===
Notre Dame won the Class C State Championship in 2015, scoring a state-record 186 goals during the season.

=== Girls Soccer ===
The girls' soccer team won the Class C State Championship in 2003.

== Notable alumni ==
- Elizabeth Carolan, Class of 1998
- John Hall, Class of 1965
- Molly Huddle, Class of 2002
- Stanley L. Klos, Class of 1972
- Jeanine Pirro, Class of 1968
- Bill Spaulding
