= TLC: Tables, Ladders & Chairs (2010) =

World Wrestling Entertainment pay-per-view event

- Promotional poster featuring Rey Mysterio
- Promotion: World Wrestling Entertainment
- Brand(s): Raw; SmackDown
- Date: December 19, 2010
- City: Houston, Texas
- Venue: Toyota Center
- Attendance: 11,500
- Buy rate: 195,000

Pay-per-view chronology
← Previous; Survivor Series	Next → Royal Rumble

TLC: Tables, Ladders & Chairs chronology
← Previous; 2009	Next → 2011

The 2010 TLC: Tables, Ladders & Chairs was a professional wrestling pay-per-view (PPV) event produced by World Wrestling Entertainment (WWE). It was the second annual TLC: Tables, Ladders & Chairs and took place on December 19, 2010, at the Toyota Center in Houston, Texas, held for wrestlers from the promotion's Raw and SmackDown brand divisions. It was the last TLC held under the first brand split, which ended in August 2011, but was reinstated in July 2016. The concept of the show was based around the primary matches of the card each utilizing tables, ladders, and chairs as legal weapons.

Seven matches were contested at the event. In the main event, John Cena defeated Wade Barrett in a chairs match. Other prominent matches included The Miz retaining Raw's WWE Championship against Randy Orton in a tables match, Edge defeated defending champion Kane, Rey Mysterio, and Alberto Del Rio to win SmackDown's World Heavyweight Championship in a Tables, Ladders, and Chairs match, and in the opening bout, Dolph Ziggler retained SmackDown's Intercontinental Championship against Jack Swagger and Kofi Kingston in a three-way Ladder match.

== Production ==
=== Background ===
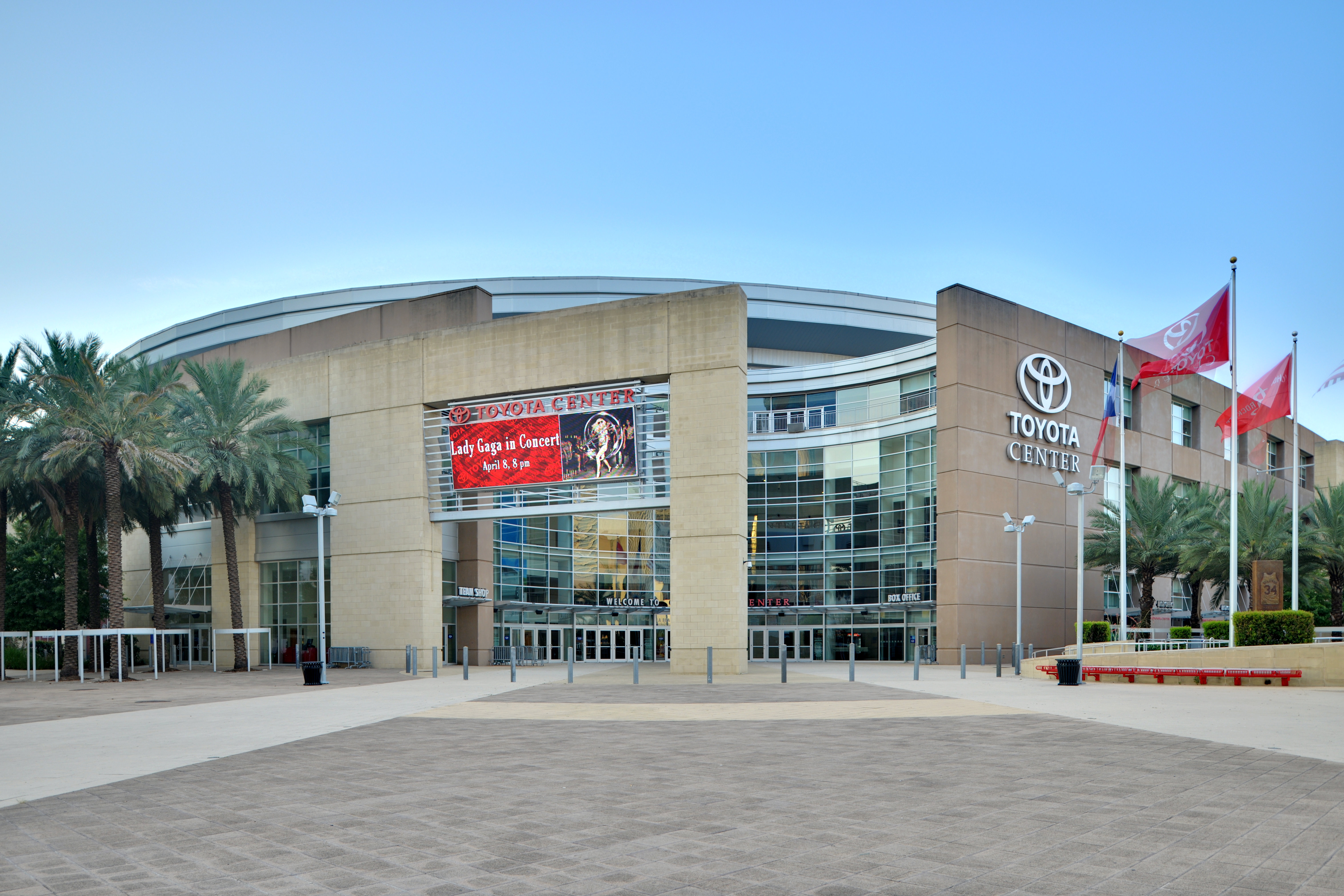
The second annual TLC: Tables, Ladders & Chairs was held at the Toyota Center in Houston, Texas.

In 2009, World Wrestling Entertainment (WWE) held a professional wrestling pay-per-view (PPV) event titled TLC: Tables, Ladders & Chairs, which replaced the previously annual December PPV, Armageddon. The concept of the show was based on the primary matches of the card each containing a stipulation using tables, ladders, and chairs as legal weapons, with the main event being a Tables, Ladders, and Chairs match. A second TLC event was scheduled for December 19, 2010, at the Toyota Center in Houston, Texas and featured wrestlers from the Raw and SmackDown brands. This established TLC as the new annual December PPV.

=== Storylines ===
TLC: Tables, Ladders & Chairs featured professional wrestling matches involving different wrestlers from pre-existing scripted feuds, plots, and storylines that were played out on World Wrestling Entertainment's (WWE) television shows, Raw and SmackDown. Wrestlers portrayed villains or heroes as they followed a series of events that built tension and culminated in a wrestling match or series of matches.

The main rivalry from SmackDown involved Kane against Edge, Rey Mysterio, and Alberto Del Rio for the World Heavyweight Championship. In October, Edge was named number one contender for the World Heavyweight Championship. In his quest for the title, Edge abducted and psychologically tormented Kane's father Paul Bearer. At the previous pay-per-view, Survivor Series, Edge failed to claim the World Heavyweight Championship after the match ended in a draw via double pinfall. With Edge still in custody of Bearer, he continued to taunt Kane leading to a match on the December 3 episode of SmackDown. Edge beat Kane and as a result, determined the stipulation to be a Tables, Ladders, and Chairs match (a match type that Edge helped pioneer) for the World Heavyweight Championship. The following week, Edge fools Kane when he mistakenly pushed another dummy, only to be revealed that it was the real Paul Bearer, injuring and written him out of the storyline. Then the week after, General Manager Theodore Long added Rey Mysterio and Alberto Del Rio, who were previously in a rivalry themselves and scheduled to be in a Chairs match against each other, to the World Heavyweight Championship match making it a Fatal 4-Way Tables, Ladders and Chairs match. That same night, Kane rampaged into the stadium to hunt down Edge but the Smackdown roster prevented the chaos.

The main rivalry from Raw involved The Miz against Randy Orton for the WWE Championship. After Orton successfully defended the WWE Championship against Wade Barrett on the November 22 episode of Raw, The Miz cashed in his Money in the Bank contract to face Orton immediately afterward and defeated Orton for the WWE Championship. On the December 6 episode of Raw, Orton tried to use his rematch clause, but the Anonymous Raw General Manager said that The Miz did not have to defend the WWE Championship that night, but would instead defend it at TLC: Tables, Ladders and Chairs, with The Miz choosing the stipulation. After interfering in Orton's match with The Miz's apprentice, Alex Riley, The Miz decided that the stipulation would be a tables match.

Another rivalry from Raw involved John Cena and Wade Barrett in a Chairs match. In November 2010 at Survivor Series, former Nexus member Cena lost his job after Randy Orton defeated Barrett under the stipulation that if Barrett did not win the WWE Championship, Cena would be fired for not following Barrett's orders. However, following his firing, Cena continued to attack Nexus members knowing that since Nexus attacked the security upon their debut, Cena would be free to attack Nexus without any restraints. This came to a head when on the December 6 episode of Raw, Cena stated that his attacks on Nexus may stop, but the attacks on Barrett will not. This caused a mutiny within Nexus. The following week, during the Slammy Awards, Barrett would rehire Cena, who would have been kicked out by the other members of Nexus had he not, under the condition that Cena would face Barrett in a Chairs match.

Another rivalry involved Team LayCool (Layla and Michelle McCool) against The Divas of Doom (WWE Divas Champion Natalya and Beth Phoenix) in a Divas tag team tables match. After Natalya defeated LayCool in a two on one handicap match to win the Divas Championship in November at Survivor Series, they attacked her after the match until Phoenix (who has been out of action with an ACL injury since May) made her return and saved Natalya. Soon after, Natalya and Phoenix formed an alliance. Two weeks later during the Slammy Awards, LayCool would win two awards, one for Knucklehead moment of the year and another for Diva of the year after McCool won a battle royal. After the match, the Anonymous Raw General Manager announced that LayCool will face Natalya and Phoenix in the first ever Divas tag team tables match.

Also in November, both Sheamus and John Morrison competed in the 2010 King of the Ring tournament. Sheamus qualified by defeating R Truth while Morrison qualified by defeating Tyson Kidd. They faced each other in the finals in which Sheamus defeated Morrison to win the Tournament and renamed himself to "King Sheamus". At Survivor Series, Morrison defeated Sheamus. The two were later booked into a match to determine the number one contender for the WWE Championship in a ladder match.

== Event ==
Other on-screen personnel
Role:	Name:
English commentators	Michael Cole
English commentators	Jerry Lawler
English commentators	Matt Striker
English commentators	CM Punk (Cena vs. Barrett)
Spanish commentators	Carlos Cabrera
Spanish commentators	Hugo Savinovich
Interviewer	Josh Matthews
Ring announcer	Justin Roberts
Referees	Mike Chioda
Referees	Charles Robinson
Referees	John Cone

=== Preliminary matches ===
The actual pay-per-view opened with a triple threat ladder match for the Intercontinental Championship involving Dolph Ziggler defending against Kofi Kingston and Jack Swagger. Ziggler was the first to climb a ladder only to be stopped by Kingston and Swagger. Ziggler performed a leg drop bulldog on Kingston onto a ladder, which Swagger was laid outunder. With all three men down, Ziggler's manager Vickie Guerrero attempted to climb the ladder. Kingston tried to tip her off the ladder but was stopped by Swagger. Swagger applied an ankle lock on Kingston whilst he was trying to climb the ladder. Ziggler attempted to grab the title but was stopped by Kingston, Ziggler locked in the sleeper hold on him at the top of the ladder, but Kingston managed to escape. Kingston tried to grab the title but when Swagger arrived up the ladder, both of them unhooked the title and it fell. Ziggler took the opportunity to retrieve the title and retained the championship.

Next, the tag team tables match between LayCool (Layla and Michelle McCool) and Beth Phoenix and Natalya was contested. Phoenix and Natalya wasted little time as they brought in the customized pink table which featured a caricature drawing of LayCool. McCool and Layla dominated the duo for a while, they tossed Phoenix out of the ring and focused on Natalya. McCool attempted to put Natalya through one of the standard tables only for Phoenix to come to her rescue. Phoenix and Natalya picked Layla up ready to put her through the table but McCool knocked the table over. Later, Natalya applied a double sharpshooter on Layla and McCool whilst Phoenix prepared the caricature table. McCool and Layla gained control and attempted a double superplex on Natalya but Natalya pushed the two onto the customized table and performed a splash, which broke the table and The Divas of Doom won the match.

After that, the WWE Tag Team Championship match was contested. The champions Santino Marella and Vladimir Kozlov faced The Nexus members Justin Gabriel and Heath Slater. The match went back and forth with Gabriel and Slater tagging in and out regularly. Eventually, Gabriel and Slater were disqualified when fellow Nexus member Michael McGillicutty interfered. Afterward, the rest of the Nexus attacked Marella and Kozlov until Nexus leader Wade Barrett arrived with a steel chair and attacked the two with it.

In the fourth match, John Morrison faced Sheamus in a ladder match to determine the #1 contender for the WWE Championship. Not long after the bell, the match spilled outside the ring, where Sheamus bridging a ladder between the ring apron and a broadcast table. Sheamus backed Morrison into the corner using the erect ladder but Morrison leapfrogged over it and performed a corkscrew on Sheamus. Later, Sheamus trapped Morrison by causing him to hang upside down on the ladder by his knee and then tipped the ladder over. Sheamus continued to target Morrison's knee. Morrison attempted to climb the ladder but Sheamus executed a Brogue Kick to Morrison's knee. Sheamus tried to grab the contract but Morrison stopped him. After brawling, the pair eventually fell with Morrison falling to the outside whilst Sheamus fell through the bridged ladder, which broke in half. Morrison climbed the ladder and Sheamus tried to tip him off but Morrison delivered a kick to Sheamus and retrieved the contract to win the match.

The fifth match was a tables match for the WWE Championship. This match saw the champion The Miz (accompanied by Alex Riley) square off against Randy Orton. After the two fought in the ring, Orton performed a suplex on The Miz outside the ring. The Miz set up a table outside the ring and Orton attempted to put him through it, but The Miz countered. The Miz then set up another table in the corner and Orton tried to suplex The Miz through the table from the turnbuckle, but Riley dragged the table away. Orton retrieved another table and delivered a clothesline to Riley. With the table set up, Orton prepared to put The Miz through it, but Riley distracted him. The Miz attempted a Skull Crushing Finale but Orton countered it, and the referee was accidentally knocked down. Orton performed an RKO on Riley and performed a powerbomb on him through the table. The Miz then gave Orton a Skull Crushing Finale, moved Riley away from the broken table and put Orton in his place. He then tried to tell the referee that he had put Orton through the table, so the referee called for the bell and The Miz was declared the winner of the match. However, the referee saw the replays after the match and restarted the match. Orton attacked The Miz, who retreated to the ring. As Orton climbed the apron, The Miz pushed Riley into Orton, who fell through a table outside the ring. This meant that The Miz retained the championship.

In the penultimate match, the fatal four-way Tables, Ladders, and Chairs match for the World Heavyweight Championship was contested. This match saw defending champion Kane take on Rey Mysterio, Alberto Del Rio, and Edge. Wasting little time, Mysterio set up the first ladder and climbed it but was pushed off by Del Rio and landed outside the ring on top of Kane and Edge. Del Rio tried to climb the ladder but was stopped by Mysterio. Mysterio used a smaller ladder to perform a seated senton on Del Rio with the ladder sandwiched between them. Edge and Kane went one on one for a while until Kane turned his attention to everyone which resulted in the other three participants teaming on him. After placing Kane on a table outside the ring, Edge climbed the ladder inside the ring and jumped straight onto Kane breaking the table. Del Rio and Mysterio took the opportunity to fight one on one. Edge performed the spear on Mysterio and climbed the ladder, Kane pushed the ladder over. Kane then went on to dominate all three men. All four of them took the match to the stage, where Edge gave Kane a spear. Mysterio climbed onto one of the tables that was hanging from the stage and jumped off it landing on Kane. Del Rio, Mysterio and Edge returned to the ring where Edge blocked Mysterio's 619 with a chair. Mysterio and Edge both climbed the ladder and both fell to the canvas too. During this time Ricardo Rodriguez climbed the ladder only to be chokeslammed by Kane. Del Rio tried to grab the title, but Mysterio pushed the ladder, sending Del Rio through a table outside the ring. Mysterio was stopped from climbing the ladder by Kane and received a Tombstone piledriver. Edge speared Kane off the apron through a table. With all three men down, Edge climbed the ladder and grabbed the title to become the new champion.

=== Main event ===
In the main event, the chairs match between John Cena and The Nexus leader Wade Barrett was contested. CM Punk made his way down to the ring for commentary. Not long into the match Barrett picked up a chair and tried to strike Cena numerous times but was unsuccessful. Cena delivered a bulldog to Barrett on a steel chair. Later, Barrett dominated and slowed down the pace of the match as he followed Cena around the ring and up the ramp whilst hitting him with a chair. Barrett then set the steel steps upright at the bottom of the ramp. Cena went backstage and returned with a swivel chair. He sat a groggy Barrett in the swivel chair, threw water at his face and pushed him down the ramp straight into the steel steps. Barrett quickly recovered, placed a steel chair around Cena's neck and pushed him into the ring post. Barrett tossed Cena back into the ring and trapped Cena under a chair by sitting on it. Barrett continued to dominate again as he trapped Cena's arms between the top and middle ropes and attacked him with a chair. Cena managed to kick Barrett away, escape from the tangled ropes and build some momentum. However, Cena's dominance was quickly diminished as Barrett seized control once again. Barrett went to the top rope with a steel chair and attempted a diving elbow drop but Cena rolled out of the way. Cena went to the top rope this time and successfully performed a diving leg drop bulldog with a steel chair. He then set up six chairs, in two rows and delivered an Attitude Adjustment to Barrett through them. Cena then got the pinfall on Barrett to win the match. Afterward, Cena followed a crawling Barrett up the ramp with a steel chair. He positioned Barrett under the hanging steel chairs at the side of the stage and pulled the set down which led all the chairs to come crashing down on top of Barrett thus ending the show.

== Reception ==
11,500 people attended the event live at the Toyota Center in Houston, Texas. The pay-per-view received 195,000 buys, down from the 228,000 that the previous year's event received.

== Aftermath ==
After Morrison won the ladder match he got his WWE Championship match on the January 3, 2011 episode of Raw against The Miz in a Falls Count Anywhere Match where Miz retained the title.

The 2010 TLC event would also be the final TLC to occur under the first brand split, which ended in August 2011. However, the brand split would be reinstated in July 2016, which reintroduced brand-exclusive PPVs, with that year's TLC event being SmackDown-exclusive. Additionally, in April 2011, the promotion ceased using its full name with the "WWE" abbreviation becoming an orphaned initialism.

== Results ==
No.	Results	Stipulations	Times
1^{D}	Daniel Bryan (c) defeated Ted DiBiase (with Maryse) by submission	Singles match for the WWE United States Championship	05:18
2	Dolph Ziggler (c) defeated Kofi Kingston and Jack Swagger	Triple Threat Ladder match for the WWE Intercontinental Championship	08:56
3	Beth Phoenix and Natalya defeated LayCool (Layla and Michelle McCool)	Tables match	09:20
4	Santino Marella and Vladimir Kozlov (c) defeated The Nexus (Heath Slater and Justin Gabriel) (with Husky Harris and Michael McGillicutty) by disqualification	Tag team match for the WWE Tag Team Championship	06:28
5	John Morrison defeated King Sheamus	Ladder match to determine the #1 contender to the WWE Championship	19:08
6	The Miz (c) (with Alex Riley) defeated Randy Orton	Tables match for the WWE Championship	13:40
7	Edge defeated Kane (c), Rey Mysterio, and Alberto Del Rio (with Ricardo Rodriguez)	Fatal 4-Way Tables, Ladders, and Chairs match for the World Heavyweight Championship	22:45
8	John Cena defeated Wade Barrett by pinfall	Chairs match	19:11
(c) / – the champion(s) heading into the match; D / – this was a dark match
