= LayCool =

Professional wrestling tag team

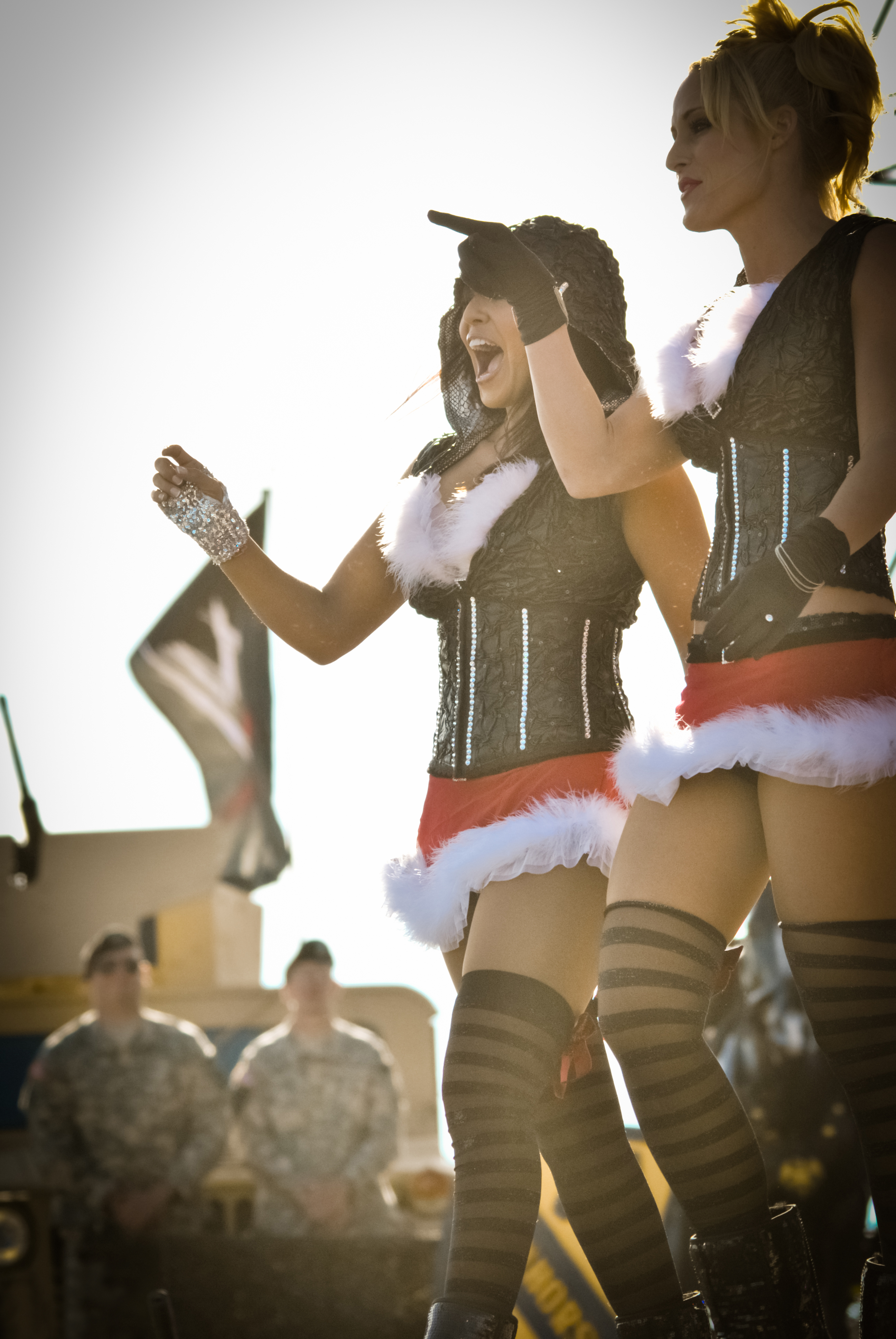
- Layla (left) and McCool (right) appearing at the WWE Tribute to the Troops event in 2010

Tag team
- Members: Layla; Michelle McCool
- Name: LayCool
- Debut: July 3, 2009
- Disbanded: May 1, 2011
- Years active: 2009–2011

LayCool (sometimes stylized Lay-Cool) were a professional wrestling tag team consisting of Layla and Michelle McCool. The team worked for WWE and were featured primarily on the SmackDown brand but appeared on the Raw brand on some occasions, while they were champions and were also part of the second season of NXT, mentoring Kaval, who won the competition.

They first began teaming together in June 2009 but did not become a proper team until the end of the year. The two were portrayed as narcissistic and vain bullies, constantly espousing their own perfection while ganging up on others and attacking their looks. They were a successful team, having won both women's titles available in WWE, the WWE Women's Championship, which they retired when they unified it with the WWE Divas Championship; both titles they claimed to hold as a tag team though this is not officially recognized. The group did court some controversy, however, receiving criticism from the Wrestling Observer Newsletter for what it considered the most disgusting promotional tactic regarding a storyline in which they bullied Mickie James for her supposed weight issues.

On May 1, 2011, after nearly two years together, the team disbanded following several disagreements, at which point Layla defeated McCool in a Loser Leaves WWE match.

== History ==
=== Formation and feud with Mickie James (2009–2010) ===
Though Layla and McCool had been tagging together over the summer of 2009 (due to partly because of a feud between McCool and Melina over the Women's Championship until she was traded back to Raw), they did not become a unit and display signs of a similar character and gimmick until the end of the year when Mickie James moved to SmackDown. James defeated Layla in her first match back on the show on October 23, while reigning Women's Champion McCool snubbed Mickie James when picking Divas to represent SmackDown against Raw in a Bragging Rights interbrand tag team match, when her team won. Layla and McCool appeared in a backstage segment on the November 6 episode of SmackDown threatening to make life difficult for James unless she left the brand. They began doing so the following week, by bringing James' clothes to the ringside and cutting them, distracting her enough to lose the match she was in. With James refusing to leave the brand, the situation escalated the following week as McCool began mocking James' weight and agricultural background. After James won a match against Layla, McCool appeared in a cartoon video that depicted James as a pig, renaming her "Piggie James" as both LayCool would continue to do, while singing a parody of "Old MacDonald Had a Farm" and a parody of the Porky Pig bass drum outro with the catchphrase "Th-Th-Th-Th-That's All Folks", portraying James as Porky. This particular segment garnered criticism from journalists, describing it as disgusting and despicable.

Subsequently, at the following pay-per-view, Survivor Series, McCool led a team of five Divas, including Layla, against James' team, James' team won with two surviving members: James and Raw's Divas Champion Melina. James was granted a match for the Women's Championship at TLC: Tables, Ladders and Chairs, after winning a triple threat match on the December 4 episode of SmackDown, with James defiantly refusing to leave the SmackDown brand despite continued harassment from LayCool. At Tables, Ladders & Chairs, Layla interfered in the match to help McCool retain the championship. Despite the win, LayCool continued to torment James as they tried to make her leave, buying her a Jenny Craig gift certificate for the Christmas Day episode of SmackDown, but gained some revenge by pinning Layla in a tag team match in the same episode.

Going into the new year, the rivalry widened on the January 1 episode of SmackDown. LayCool interfered in a match between James and Beth Phoenix and attacked James after; Phoenix responded by chasing away LayCool but giving the Glam Slam to James as well. The following week, Phoenix defeated Layla, but afterwards LayCool assaulted her together until James saved Phoenix. On January 22's SmackDown, in an unusually long segment for the Divas, LayCool held a leaving party for James complete with a pig-shaped cake. Originally Maria came out to defend champion James, but James also appeared to answer LayCool. After a brawl broke out, Phoenix arrived on the scene appearing to come to their aid only to assist LayCool in attacking James and Maria. McCool hit James with the cake and poured punch over her. LayCool continued to deride James, with Layla dressing up in a fatsuit with a pig mask and losing to McCool in a faux match for the Women's Championship as Piggie James. LayCool's boasting would be their downfall at the Royal Rumble, however, when Layla came out in the Piggie James outfit. James used this to her advantage, when she attacked Layla which distracted McCool allowing her to be pinned in under a minute, losing the Women's Championship. On the February 12 episode of SmackDown, LayCool defeated James in a non-title handicap match made by SmackDown Consultant Vickie Guerrero, who had been accidentally humiliated by James backstage.

=== Acquisition of Vickie Guerrero and co-champions (2010–2011) ===
With a common enemy, Guerrero began accompanying LayCool, interfering in their matches and favoring them in scripted booking decisions such as making herself the referee in McCool's Women's Championship rematch with James where she brought the title back to McCool on the February 26 episode of SmackDown. With James out of the picture, their lingering rivalry with Phoenix flared up when Phoenix saved Tiffany from a LayCool beatdown on March 12. The following week, Tiffany and Phoenix defeated LayCool in a standard tag team match. This led to a 10-Diva tag team match at WrestleMania XXVI which LayCool helped win after Guerrero pinned Kelly Kelly with a frog splash. Phoenix gained revenge by defeating them again alongside Tiffany. On WWE Superstars, LayCool and Guerrero cut a promo in which they mocked Phoenix for not fitting their image of what a Diva should be, and Guerrero placed Phoenix in an 'intergender' match against Layla, which Phoenix won, despite heavy interfering from McCool and Guerrero. LayCool later gained a measure of revenge by defeating Phoenix and a briefly-returning James, after which they taunted Phoenix's perceived bad looks by smothering her in make-up. At the Extreme Rules pay-per-view, McCool defended her Women's Championship against Phoenix in an Extreme Makeover match, where cosmetics products were legal as weapons. Phoenix won the title from McCool, despite support from Layla and Guerrero.

On the May 14 episode of SmackDown, Guerrero announced McCool was using her rematch against Phoenix, but the match was made a handicap match with both of LayCool against Phoenix. Layla pinned Phoenix to win the Women's Championship for the first time, becoming the first British woman and Diva Search winner to hold the championship. LayCool's beating of Phoenix was given as the reason Phoenix had to take time off for an injury she was suffering from. Owing to LayCool beating Phoenix together for the title, they began referring to themselves as co-champions, even appearing with two physical title belts.

During the 2010 WWE Draft, they defeated Raw Divas (Eve & Maryse) to receive one Diva draft pick, and it was later revealed that Kelly Kelly was drafted to SmackDown and started a feud with her and her partner Tiffany. Around this time, Rosa Mendes asked to join the ranks of LayCool, but LayCool mocked and insulted her instead. LayCool continued to best Kelly and Tiffany in tag team action, but Kelly Kelly gained singles non-title victories over both Layla and McCool, earning her a Women's Championship match against Layla at Money in the Bank, which Layla won to retain the title. Layla was then informed that she would defend the Women's Championship against Tiffany on the July 30 episode of SmackDown, but Vickie Guerrero claimed that LayCool were co-women's champions, and had McCool fight in Layla's place, in which McCool was victorious. Following the match, SmackDown's General Manager, Theodore Long, informed LayCool that there was only one Women's Championship and they had to decide between them and relinquish one belt. The following week, LayCool gave one belt back and played a tug-of-war with the one belt, only for it to break in the middle and the two began to carry half of the belt each, circumventing Long's orders. Also during this time, LayCool began mentoring Kaval during the second season of NXT. They were the first females and tag team to mentor a wrestler on the show. Kaval would go on to win the season. LayCool continued to pick up victories against Kelly and Tiffany. In September, LayCool appeared on Raw and challenged WWE Divas Champion Melina to a championship unification match at Night of Champions. Despite Layla being the official champion, McCool participated in the match and won with Layla's help to unify both championships. Once again, they reigned unofficially as co-champions, wearing two belts and declaring themselves the WWE Unified Divas Champions while the Women's Championship was retired. The night after Night of Champions on Raw, Layla defended the Unified Divas Championship against Melina, cementing their status as co-champions.

After both members of Lay-Cool had successfully defended the championship against Natalya, they faced her in a two-on-one handicap match at Survivor Series, which Natalya won to become the new Divas Champion. Following Survivor Series, Beth Phoenix returned and formed an alliance with Natalya. This culminated in the first Diva Tables match at the TLC: Tables, Ladders & Chairs pay-per view where Natalya splashed both of LayCool through a table to win.

LayCool got a rematch for the Divas Championship at the Royal Rumble against Natalya, but the match was changed by the anonymous Raw general manager to a fatal-four-way match including Eve Torres, and was unsuccessful when Eve pinned Layla, despite McCool having simultaneously rolled Natalya up. Tension arose when McCool blamed Layla for the loss, but LayCool smoothed things out. In the coming weeks, Layla continued to lose, despite McCool's help, causing further friction. McCool attacked Rosa Mendes during her match with Layla and caused Layla to lose by disqualification, claiming that Layla was unable to win by herself, and Layla was furious at McCool for having no faith in her. At Elimination Chamber, LayCool attacked Kelly Kelly, who was embroiled in a rivalry with Vickie Guerrero. After saving Guerrero, a returning Trish Stratus came to help Kelly. This would lead to a match at WrestleMania XXVII, where LayCool teamed with Guerrero's on-screen boyfriend Dolph Ziggler to face Trish Stratus, Nicole "Snooki" Polizzi and John Morrison. At WrestleMania, LayCool and Ziggler lost, and tension arose again between McCool and Layla.

=== Implosion and disbanded (2011) ===
On the April 8 episode of SmackDown, tension between the team rose when McCool refused to tag Layla into a match against Kelly and Phoenix. Layla continued trying to fix their relationship, but McCool was resistant. Tension was further highlighted in a SmackDown scene where the two were seen undergoing couples therapy. When Layla lost a singles match against Kelly despite McCool's attempts to help her, McCool told Layla she was sick of doing all her work for her, and shoved her over. Finally, on the April 22 episode of SmackDown, McCool turned on Layla by attacking her after the therapy session, thereby disbanding LayCool. During the 2011 WWE Draft, McCool cost Layla a match against Eve Torres. After the match, McCool tried to taunt and bully Layla again, however Layla snapped after all of her efforts at trying to keep LayCool together, and viciously attacked McCool, saying she was sick of her, before throwing her at the announce table. On the April 29 episode of SmackDown, Layla and McCool fought to a no contest. After the match, Layla challenged McCool to a no countout, no disqualification match at Extreme Rules. McCool accepted on the condition that the loser leave WWE. At Extreme Rules, Layla defeated McCool, which meant she had to leave WWE. After the match, a debuting Kharma came out and attacked McCool with the Implant Buster, and McCool then retired from professional wrestling. Layla retired from professional wrestling on July 29, 2015.

== Championships and accomplishments ==
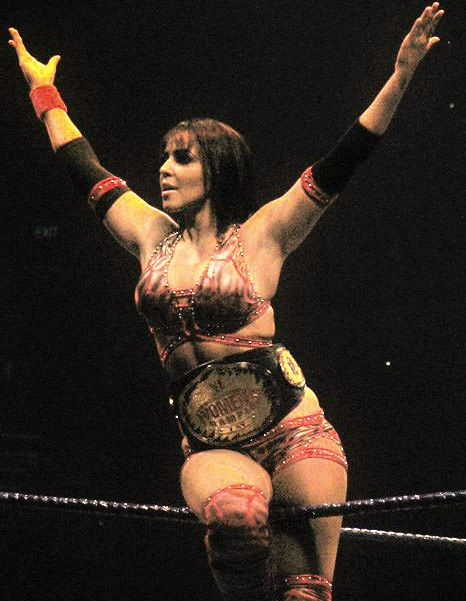
Layla was the final WWE Women's Champion.

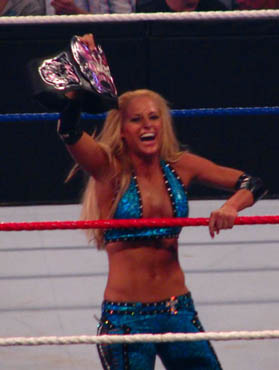
McCool was the inaugural WWE Divas Champion.

- Pro Wrestling Illustrated
  - PWI named McCool the Woman of the Year (2010) – McCool
  - PWI ranked Layla No. 36 of the top 50 female singles wrestlers in the PWI Female 50 in 2010
  - PWI ranked McCool No. 1 of the top 50 female singles wrestlers in the PWI Female 50 in 2010
- Wrestling Observer Newsletter
  - Most Disgusting Promotional Tactic (2009) Piggy James angle
- World Wrestling Entertainment/WWE
  - WWE Unified (Undisputed) Divas Championship (1 time) – McCool (1) Layla (1)
  - WWE Women's Championship (3 times) – McCool (3), Layla (1, final)
  - Slammy Award (2 times)
    - Diva of the Year (2010) – McCool
    - Knucklehead Moment of the Year (2010) Losing to Mae Young at Old School Raw
  - Ranked No. 36 on WWE.com's "50 Greatest Tag Teams in WWE History"
