= Beth Phoenix =

American professional wrestler (born 1980)

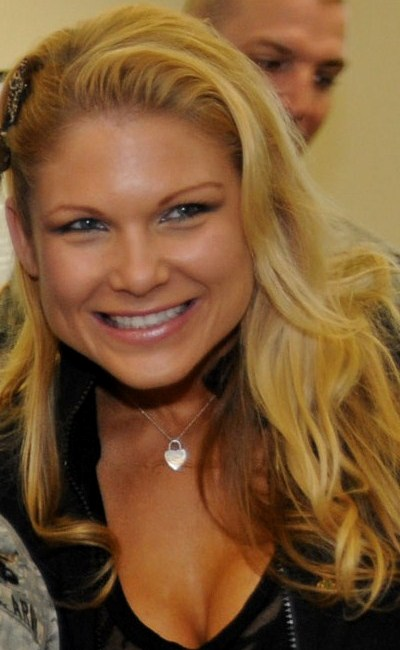
- Phoenix in 2011
- Born: Elizabeth Kociański; November 24, 1980 (age 45); Elmira, New York, U.S.
- Spouses: Joey Knight (m. 2001; div. 2010) Adam Copeland (m. 2016)
- Children: 2
- Professional wrestling career
- Ring name(s): Beth Copeland; Beth Phoenix; Fabulous Firebird; Firebird; Phoenix
- Billed height: 5 ft 7 in (170 cm)
- Billed weight: 150 lb (68 kg)
- Billed from: Buffalo, New York
- Trained by: Ron Hutchison; Joey Knight; Robin Knightwing; Ohio Valley Wrestling
- Debut: May 2001

Elizabeth Copeland (née Kociański; born November 24, 1980), better known as Beth Phoenix, is an American professional wrestler. She is best known for her tenure in WWE, where she is a former WWE Divas Champion and a three-time WWE Women's Champion.

Kociański had a successful amateur wrestling career in high school, winning several tournaments before being trained for professional wrestling by the All-Knighters. After her debut in May 2001, she wrestled for numerous independent promotions. She also appeared at the inaugural Shimmer Women Athletes shows. In 2004, she began working for Ohio Valley Wrestling (OVW) and signed a developmental contract with WWE in October 2005. She debuted on WWE's Raw brand in May 2006 but suffered a legitimate broken jaw the following month. As a result, she had numerous surgeries and returned to OVW for further training. While there, she won the OVW Women's Championship twice, although her second reign is not officially recognized by OVW.

She returned to the Raw brand in July 2007, and was heavily pushed, dominating the other WWE Divas and gaining the nickname, "The Glamazon". She won her first WWE Women's Championship at the No Mercy pay-per-view in October, and held it for six months. She then developed an on-screen relationship with Santino Marella, dubbed "Glamarella", and won the Women's Championship for a second time in August 2008, holding it until January 2009. In January 2010, at the Royal Rumble, she became the second woman in the history of the event to enter the men's Royal Rumble match, and went on to win the Women's Championship for the third time in April, holding it for a month. In October 2011, Phoenix won the WWE Divas Championship for the first time and lost it in April 2012. Phoenix retired and left WWE in October 2012 due to creative frustrations with the treatment of women in WWE, and to focus on her family life with boyfriend and later husband Adam Copeland, famous in WWE as Edge, with whom she subsequently had two daughters.

In 2017, Phoenix returned to WWE upon being inducted into the WWE Hall of Fame as part of the 2017 class; her induction made her the fastest woman to be inducted after her retirement and the youngest inductee in history at age 36. After receiving the Frank Gotch Award for her philanthropic work in 2015, she became she also became the first woman to be inducted in the George Tragos/Lou Thesz Professional Wrestling Hall of Fame, a hall of fame dedicated to professional wrestlers with an amateur background, in 2019. Phoenix had wrestled on a part-time basis from 2018 to 2023, most notably at WrestleMania 35; she also took part in the first-ever women's Royal Rumble match in 2018, making her the first wrestler to have participated in both the men's and women's matches. From May 2019 to December 2021, she was a full-time commentator on NXT.

== Early life ==
Elizabeth Kociański was born in Elmira, New York and raised by Polish parents.

When she was eleven years old, she won a coloring contest with a prize of tickets to a television taping for the World Wrestling Federation. Kociański credits this as the moment she fell in love with professional wrestling. She cites Bret Hart, Sgt. Slaughter, Owen Hart, and Ted DiBiase as her favorite wrestlers.

Kociański attended Notre Dame High School in Elmira, where she played tennis and ran track. She was voted prom queen in her senior year.

Kociański graduated from Canisius College in Buffalo, New York with a bachelor's degree in criminal justice and public relations. She also worked as a waitress at a local restaurant known to Elmira natives as Lights Bakery and Coffee Shop while wrestling in OVW.

== Amateur wrestling career ==
Elizabeth Kociański began wrestling on the Notre Dame High School scholastic wrestling team. She was the first female varsity wrestler in the school's history. She became the North-East freestyle women's champion in 1999, and also won at the New York State Fair Tournament the same year. At the time, she was also a member of USA Wrestling, a freestyle and Greco-Roman wrestling association. Her life goal was, according to her, to become a professional wrestler, and she believed that having a solid amateur background would help her reach it.

== Professional wrestling career ==
=== Early career (2001–2005) ===
After graduating from high school in 1998, she enrolled in both a professional wrestling school and Canisius College in Buffalo, New York. Her first choice for wrestling school was Stu Hart's Dungeon, but because of the location, she decided on a more local school. At the school, she was trained by the All Knighters (Joey Knight and Robin Knightwing), who themselves had trained in the Hart Dungeon. She later stated that Nora Greenwald, who was known in the World Wrestling Federation (WWF) as Molly Holly, had paid for her to attend wrestling school after Carolan had given her a demo tape of her work. Her professional wrestling debut match was against Alexis Laree. She then worked for various independent promotions, including Cleveland All Pro Wrestling and Apocalypse Wrestling, against both male and female wrestlers, using the name "Phoenix". In 2002, she was one of the first wrestlers in GLORY, an independent organization for women, and was the inaugural GLORY Champion. She then joined Far North Wrestling (FNW), and was the only female wrestler in the promotion. She defeated Joey Knight and Kevin Grace in 2003 to become the FNW Cruiserweight Champion. Later in 2003 she took part in World Xtreme Wrestling's annual Women's Elite 8 tournament where she made it to the final, before losing to April Hunter. She returned two years later and defeated Nikki Roxx, but was bested in the second round by eventual winner Alicia. The following month, Phoenix appeared at the inaugural taping for the Ring of Honor sister promotion Shimmer Women Athletes; during Volume 1 she was pinned by Shimmer founder Allison Danger but scored an upset victory in a non-title match against NWA Midwest Women's Champion MsChif.

=== World Wrestling Entertainment / WWE ===
==== Ohio Valley Wrestling (2004–2006) ====
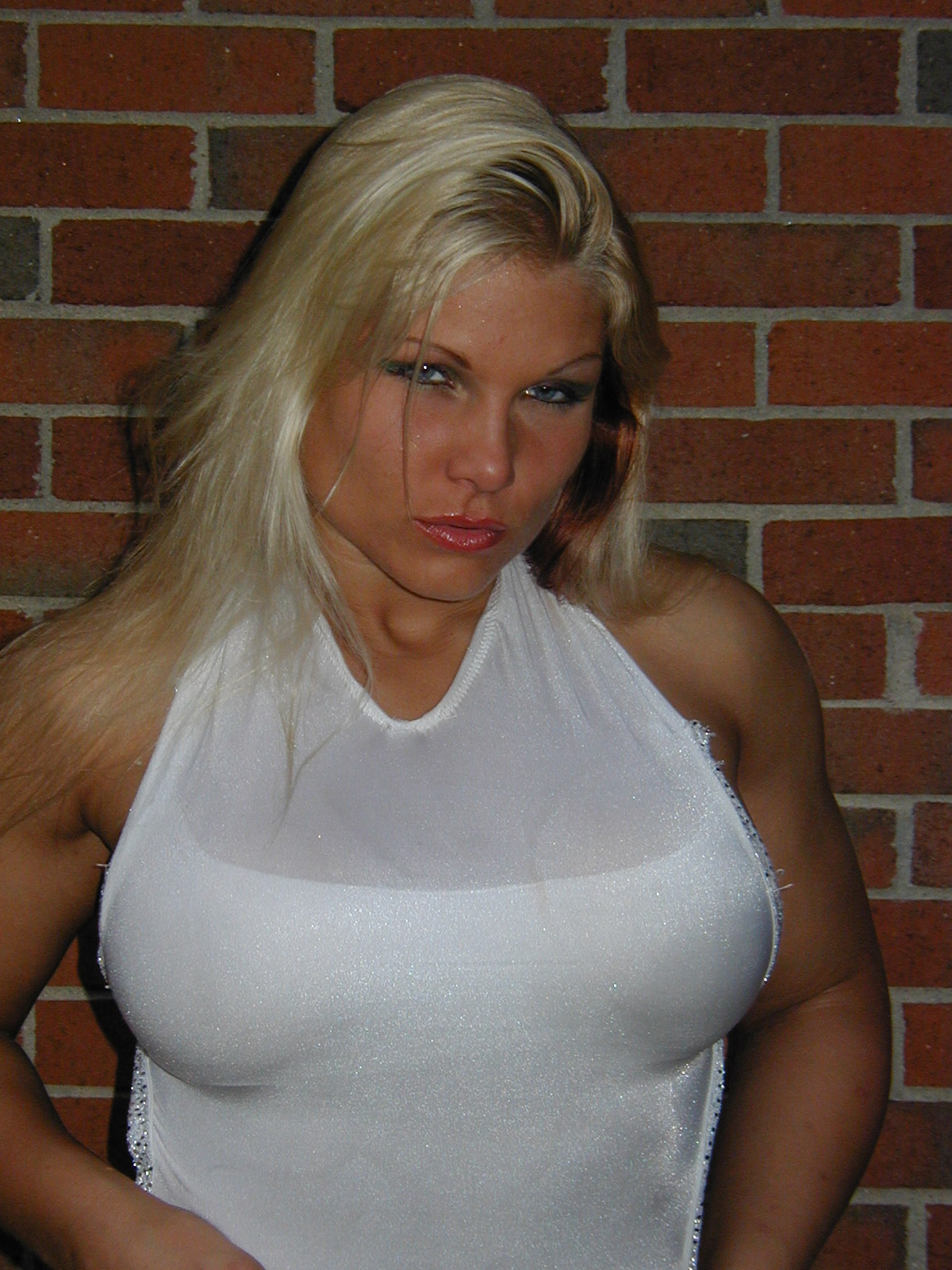
Phoenix during an OVW show in July 2005

Kociański was invited to a tryout with World Wrestling Entertainment (WWE) in May 2004, and then relocated to Louisville, Kentucky, to work for their then-developmental territory, Ohio Valley Wrestling (OVW). She debuted on OVW television in July 2004, having changed her ring name to "Beth Phoenix", and became the on-screen girlfriend and valet of Chris Masters. The storyline was short-lived, and the following month Phoenix was repackaged as the manager of Aaron "The Idol" Stevens. She signed a developmental contract with WWE on October 20, 2005, the same month that she broke her hand. The duo was then joined by Shelly Martinez, who Phoenix soon feuded within early 2006.

==== Trish Stratus' ally (2006) ====
Phoenix debuted on WWE's main roster on the May 8, 2006, episode of Raw as a face by attacking Mickie James while James was assaulting Trish Stratus. After this incident, James berated Phoenix for "ruining everything" and questioned why she showed up in the first place. A week later, Phoenix was formally introduced by Stratus and then attacked a distracted James on Stratus's behalf. When James finally escaped, Phoenix claimed that James had "ruined her life", and would not let her get away with it, before calling her a "psycho". On the following episode of Raw, Phoenix attacked James after her match with Torrie Wilson. Then, on the May 29 episode of Raw, Phoenix and Wilson, with Stratus in their corner, teamed together to defeat Candice Michelle and Victoria, who had James in their corner. During the June 5 episode of Raw, Phoenix suffered a legitimately fractured mandible during a match with Victoria, but was able to continue the match, and emerged victorious despite the injury. Phoenix's jaw was entirely severed and subsequent surgeries left a portion of her face permanently numb. She spent a year having surgeries and recovering, including getting a titanium plate and nine screws placed in her jaw, but she was only out of action for two months, as she returned to action in OVW instead of on the main roster.

==== Return to Ohio Valley Wrestling (2006–2007) ====
After sustaining her injury on the main roster, Phoenix returned to action in OVW on August 16, 2006, defeating Serena. Phoenix began regularly competing for the OVW Women's Championship, unsuccessfully challenging the champion ODB in a battle royal and a four-way match, which was won by Serena. At the October 4 OVW television tapings, however, Phoenix defeated Serena to win the championship. She lost the championship to Victoria Crawford in a gauntlet match on October 20, and won it back the next day; however, Crawford's title reign is not officially recognized, and as a result, neither is Phoenix's second reign. Phoenix officially dropped the championship in a gauntlet match at the November 1 television taping, after she was eliminated by Katie Lea, who eventually won the match.

On the November 6 episode of OVW, Phoenix came out with her championship and claimed to still be the women's champion. As a result, a ladder match was set up, where the winner would become the undisputed OVW Women's Champion. Lea won the match and was presented with the title belt on the first show of 2007. Throughout 2007, Phoenix continued to wrestle in numerous women's matches in OVW. Phoenix made her last appearance in OVW at their August 15 television tapings where she lost to Lea in a number one contenders match.

==== The Glamazon (2007–2008) ====
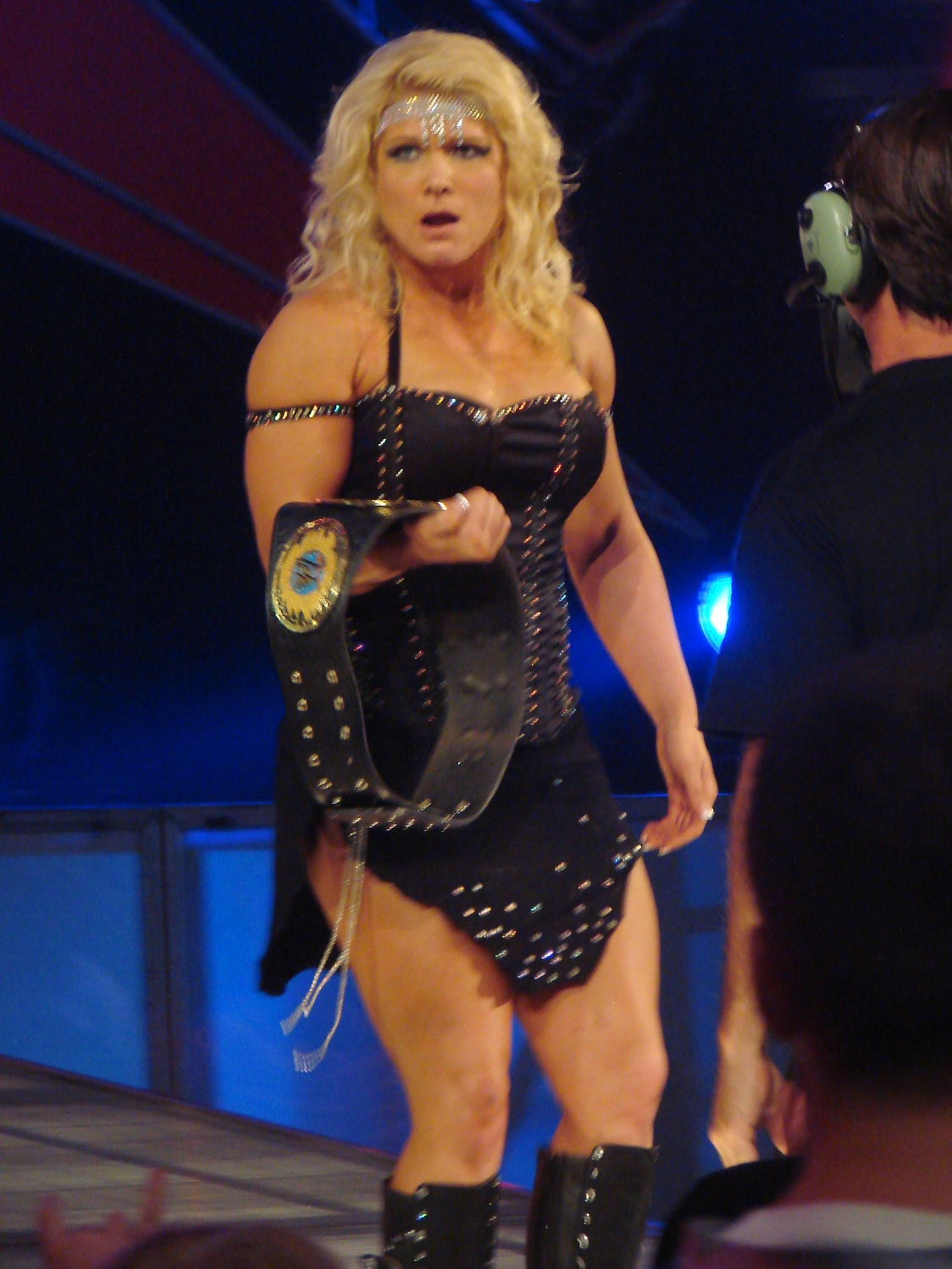
Phoenix after winning the Women's Championship at No Mercy in October 2007

On the July 9, 2007, episode of Raw, Phoenix returned as a villain, when Melina claimed to be injured. Phoenix replaced Melina in a tag team match as Jillian Hall's friend, and the two lost to Candice Michelle and Mickie James. At the SummerSlam pay-per-view, Phoenix won the Interpromotional Divas battle royal to become the number one contender for Michelle's WWE Women's Championship. Phoenix was then pushed as a dominating Diva, dubbing herself "The Glamazon" and attacking James, Hall, and Michelle on the September 10 episode of Raw. At Unforgiven, however, she failed to capture the Women's Championship from Michelle. Their storyline rivalry continued when Phoenix pinned Michelle during a non-title mixed tag team match on Raw on September 24.

At No Mercy in October, Phoenix defeated Michelle to win her first WWE Women's Championship. She retained the title on the October 22 episode of Raw in a two out of three falls match, in which Candice Michelle was injured by Phoenix shaking the rope, causing her to fall off the top turnbuckle and legitimately break her clavicle.

During a 10-Diva tag team match at Survivor Series, Phoenix's team lost after Melina was pinned by Mickie James. On the November 26 episode of Raw, James defeated Melina in a number one contenders match for Phoenix's Women's Championship, setting up a title match between the two at Armageddon, a match in which Phoenix successfully defended her Women's title. On New Year's Eve 2008, Phoenix successfully defended her title in a Triple Threat match against Melina and James, after pinning Melina.

Phoenix, along with then-ally Melina, took part in the Playboy BunnyMania Lumberjack match at WrestleMania XXIV, where she defeated the team of Ashley and Maria. On April 14, 2008, Phoenix faced Mickie James with her Women's Championship on the line and lost, ending her reign as champion. Phoenix received a rematch on the May 5 episode of Raw in a lumberjill match, but lost after Melina unintentionally hit her in the face with her boot. On the May 12 episode of Raw, Melina and Phoenix partnered to face Maria and James. During the match, Melina unintentionally knocked Phoenix off of the ring apron, resulting in Phoenix abandoning Melina, which allowed James and Maria to pick up the win. Later that night, Melina and Phoenix brawled in a backstage segment, ending their alliance. At Judgment Day, She failed to regain the Women's Championship in a Triple Threat match after James pinned Melina to retain the title. At One Night Stand, Phoenix defeated Melina in the first women's "I Quit" match in WWE history. The next night on Raw, She teamed with Katie Lea Burchill to defeat Melina and James in a tag team match. She was pinned by James one week later in a non-title match, and was once again destroyed by Melina post-match.

==== Glamarella (2008–2009) ====
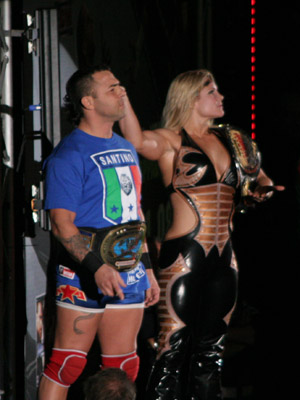
Santino Marella and Phoenix in November 2008 as the Intercontinental and Women's champions, respectively

After a month absence from television, Phoenix returned on the July 14 episode of Raw, where she defeated Santino Marella after he issued an open challenge to any WWE wrestler backstage. The storyline continued the following week after Marella lost to the returning D-Lo Brown. Phoenix confronted Marella after the match, and they briefly grappled with each other before unexpectedly sharing a kiss, to which both expressed considerable confusion.

The two then became an on-screen power couple, and the pairing of Phoenix and Marella later became known by the portmanteau Glamarella. Within the team, she acted as the straight-woman, berating Marella or reacting in disbelief to his over-the-top, embarrassing antics. At SummerSlam, they defeated Kofi Kingston and Mickie James in an intergender tag team match. Phoenix pinned James, winning the Women's Championship, while Marella won Kingston's Intercontinental Championship. She successfully defended the Women's Championship against Candice Michelle at No Mercy. At Survivor Series in November, Phoenix was team captain of the victorious Raw Diva team which defeated the SmackDown Divas in a five-on-five elimination match; she eliminated Maryse and became the sole survivor of the team.

On December 8, 2008, Phoenix received the "Slammy Award" for Diva of the Year. Phoenix then began feuding with Melina, who had returned from injury in November. This storyline included the debut of Rosa Mendes, who was introduced as Phoenix's "superfan". At the Royal Rumble in January 2009, Phoenix lost the Women's Championship to Melina. At WrestleMania XXV, Phoenix competed in the 25-Diva "Miss WrestleMania" battle royal; despite scoring 12 eliminations, more than any other participant, she lost when Marella, who competed in drag, claiming to be his twin sister "Santina", last eliminated her. After WrestleMania, Glamarella separated, as Phoenix was unhappy with Santino pretending to be "Santina". Phoenix had a brief scripted rivalry with both "Santina" and Marella, and challenged "Santina" for the "Miss WrestleMania" title at Backlash, but was unsuccessful.

==== Feud with LayCool (2009–2011) ====
After a brief hiatus, Phoenix returned on the July 27 episode of Raw, teaming with Alicia Fox and Rosa Mendes in a losing effort to Mickie James, Gail Kim, and Kelly Kelly. Phoenix had her first opportunity for the WWE Divas Championship, being narrowly defeated by the defending champion, Mickie James, on the August 31 episode of Raw, after winning a number one contender's battle royal that same night.

On the October 12 episode of Raw, it was announced that Phoenix had been traded to the SmackDown brand. Phoenix made her in-ring debut for the brand on the October 30 episode of SmackDown, defeating Jenny Brooks, an "enhancement talent". In January 2010, at the Royal Rumble, she entered the Royal Rumble match and eliminated The Great Khali, before she was eliminated by CM Punk. With her entry, she became the second woman in history to enter the Royal Rumble match, the first being Chyna.

After being told by Vickie Guerrero, the SmackDown consultant, that she would not be receiving a Women's Championship opportunity, Phoenix turned face after she saved Tiffany from an attack by Guerrero and LayCool (Michelle McCool and Layla) on the March 12 episode of SmackDown. She then went on to defeat McCool and Layla in a tag team match involving Tiffany. The feud with McCool continued at WrestleMania XXVI, where they were on opposing teams in a 10-Diva tag team match, which Phoenix's team lost, although they won a rematch the following night on Raw. On the April 23 episode of Smackdown, Phoenix teamed with Mickie James to face McCool and Layla. After the match, LayCool beat down and humiliated Phoenix by smearing make-up on her face and body while she was unconscious. This resulted in Phoenix receiving a match for the Women's Championship against McCool at Extreme Rules, where she defeated McCool in an "Extreme Makeover" match to win her third Women's Championship. On the May 6 episode of Superstars, Phoenix tore her ACL in a match against Rosa Mendes, and as a result, one week later on SmackDown, McCool invoked her rematch clause to face Phoenix in a two-on-one handicap match along with Layla, where Layla pinned Phoenix to become the new Women's Champion.

Phoenix returned from her injury at November's Survivor Series pay-per-view, and attacked the former co-champions Michelle McCool and Layla, after they lost the WWE Divas Championship to Natalya. Phoenix and Natalya then formed an alliance, and at TLC: Tables, Ladders & Chairs in December, Phoenix and Natalya defeated LayCool in the first Divas Tag Team Tables match in WWE history.

==== Divas Champion and departure (2011–2012) ====
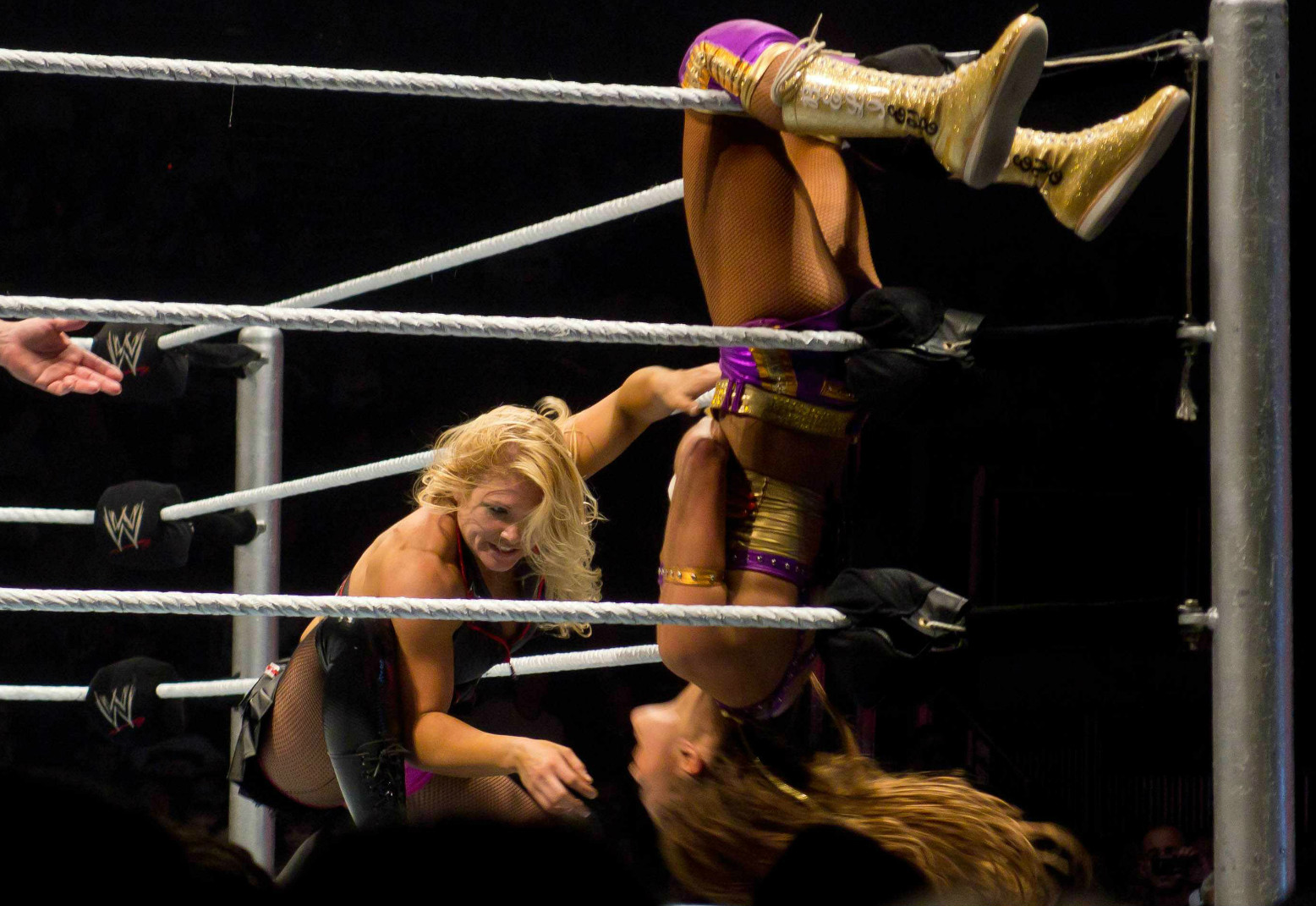
Phoenix wrestling Eve during a WWE house show in November 2011

As part of the 2011 Supplemental Draft on April 26, 2011, Phoenix returned to the Raw brand. On the August 1 episode of Raw, Phoenix won a battle royal to become the number one contender to the WWE Divas Championship, and afterward attacked champion Kelly Kelly to provoke a feud and turning heel in the process. Phoenix later declared that she was tired of the "perky bimbos" that comprised the rest of the Divas division, and was on a mission to make a mockery of the other Divas, and was joined by Natalya to form the Divas of Doom. Phoenix went on to unsuccessfully challenge Kelly for the championship at SummerSlam. Throughout September, The Divas of Doom feuded with Kelly and Eve Torres on Raw and The Chickbusters (AJ and Kaitlyn) on SmackDown. Phoenix challenged Kelly for the Divas Championship again at Night of Champions, but was unsuccessful. At Hell in a Cell in October, Phoenix defeated Kelly to win the Divas Championship for the first time, with help from Natalya. In a rematch on the October 14 episode of SmackDown, Phoenix successfully retained the championship. At Vengeance, Phoenix successfully defended the championship against Eve Torres, with both Natalya and Kelly banned from ringside. Phoenix successfully retained her championship against Torres again at Survivor Series on November 20 in a Lumberjill match, and against Kelly at TLC: Tables, Ladders & Chairs on December 18.

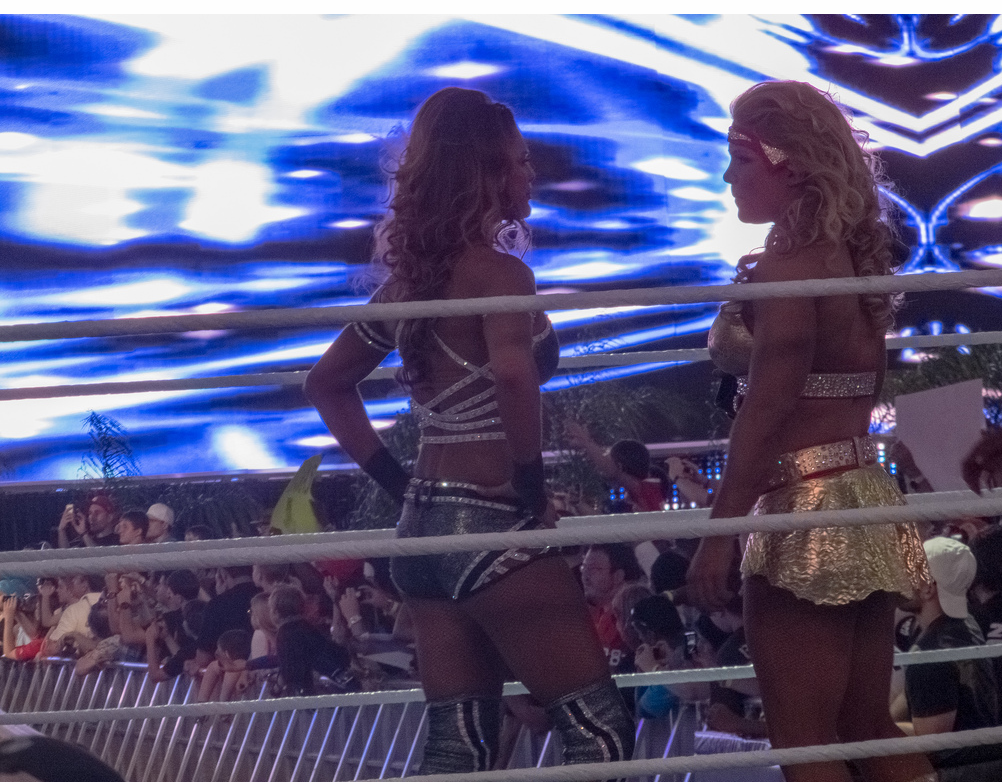
Phoenix and Eve Torres at WrestleMania 28 in April 2012

Further successful defenses followed against Torres on the January 30, 2012, episode of Raw and Tamina Snuka at Elimination Chamber on February 19. After this, Phoenix competed only sporadically for a few months, including a tag team match at WrestleMania XXVIII, where she and Eve Torres were defeated by Kelly Kelly and Maria Menounos. On the April 6 episode of SmackDown, Phoenix lost to Nikki Bella in a non-title match, following Kelly's interference. On the April 23 episode of Raw, Phoenix lost her Divas Championship to Nikki Bella in a Lumberjill match, after suffering a storyline ankle injury. At Extreme Rules, Phoenix was scheduled to face Nikki in a rematch for the Divas Championship, however she was not medically cleared to compete and was replaced by the returning Layla, who ended up winning the title. Phoenix made two unsuccessful attempts at regaining the Divas Championship from Layla at Over the Limit in May and at No Way Out in June, respectively. Phoenix lost 19 times against Divas champion Layla in various live events.

In September, Kaitlyn was attacked by an unknown assailant before her championship match at Night of Champions. Upon her return, she announced her assailant had blonde hair, and Assistant SmackDown general manager Eve Torres accused Phoenix before attacking her. On the September 28 episode of SmackDown, after defeating Natalya, Phoenix was suspended by Torres, but the suspension was later reversed by SmackDown General manager Booker T. On the October 1 episode of Raw, Phoenix lost to Torres. Phoenix turned heel again on the October 18 episode of Superstars, when she berated Kaitlyn for thinking that Phoenix attacked her and demanded respect from Kaitlyn, before losing to her in a singles match. On the October 29 episode of Raw, Phoenix was defeated by AJ Lee in a singles match, but the match was restarted by Raw Managing Supervisor Vickie Guerrero, allowing Phoenix to win. After the match, in the storyline, Guerrero fired Phoenix for her poor performance. In reality, Phoenix had given her notice to WWE in September and had decided to leave the company; although she originally claimed that she had left to focus on her family, in September 2019, she revealed that she had been "really frustrated with where the women were at from a company standpoint, and the investment that was being made in us. I felt in my heart I had done my best, and I'd try hard to change things but, at some point, I just got frustrated."

==== Hall of Fame and part–time commentator (2017–2019) ====
On February 27, 2017, WWE announced that Phoenix would be inducted into the WWE Hall of Fame as part of the 2017 class. Her induction made her the quickest female to be inducted after her retirement, as she had retired only five years prior, and made her and her husband Edge the first real-life couple to both be inducted.

In 2018, Phoenix became a part-time color commentator for WWE, mainly for women-related events, starting from January 16 to April 3, 2018, for the first season of the WWE Mixed Match Challenge, commenting the tournament each week alongside Michael Cole and Corey Graves. On January 28, 2018, at the Royal Rumble event, she made a one-night wrestling return as a face for the first time since 2012 by entering the first-ever women's Royal Rumble match as a competitor, making her the first person to appear in both a men's and women's Royal Rumble. She entered at number 24 and lasted over two minutes before being eliminated by Natalya.

Phoenix went on to continue to work as a guest commentator at various events and mainly women's matches such as the WrestleMania Women's Battle Royal at WrestleMania 34, the 2018 Mae Young Classic, the women's Royal Rumble match at the 2019 Royal Rumble event, and the Elimination Chamber match to determine the inaugural WWE Women's Tag Team Champions at the 2019 Elimination Chamber event.

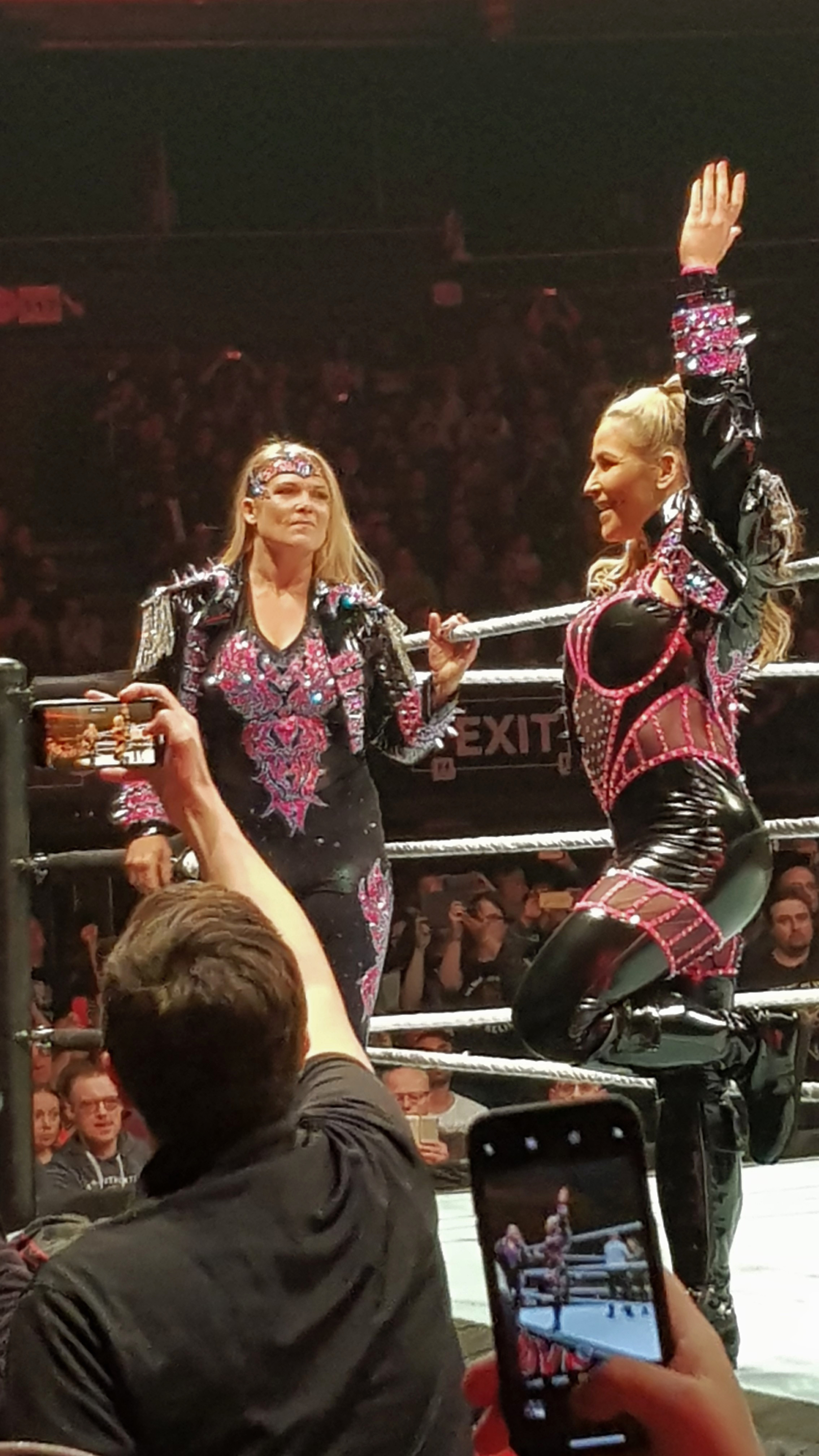
The Divas of Doom in May 2019

On March 10, 2019, at the Fastlane pay-per-view, Phoenix acted as commentator on the WWE Women's Tag Team Championship match between defending champions The Boss 'n' Hug Connection (Bayley and Sasha Banks) and Nia Jax and Tamina. After their defeat, Jax and Tamina attacked Bayley and Banks; Phoenix came to their aid, soon joined by Natalya, but the four were still overpowered by Jax and Tamina. The following day on Raw, Phoenix accompanied Natalya to her match against Jax, eventually causing a disqualification by attacking Jax.

On the March 18, 2019, episode of Raw, Phoenix announced that she was coming out of retirement; she and Natalya reformed their 2011–2012 tag team The Divas of Doom, and challenged The Boss 'n' Hug Connection for a WWE Women's Tag Team Championship match at WrestleMania 35; however, Tamina ambushed Phoenix after a distraction from Jax during a one-on-one match between Natalya and Banks. On the April 1 episode of Raw, Phoenix wrestled her first match in nearly seven years, where she teamed with Natalya, Bayley and Banks, to face off against Jax, Tamina, and The IIconics (Billie Kay and Peyton Royce), where Phoenix's team emerged victorious after she pinned Royce following a Glam Slam. At WrestleMania, Phoenix and Natalya lost to The IIconics during a fatal four-way tag team match for the Women's Tag Team Championship, when, after Phoenix performed a Glam Slam from the second rope on defending champion Bayley without realizing that The IIconics' Billie Kay had tagged Phoenix out, was thrown outside the ring by Kay's partner Peyton Royce, who allowed Kay to successfully pin Bayley.

==== Full-time NXT commentator (2019–2021) ====
On May 15, 2019, Phoenix joined the commentary team of NXT alongside Mauro Ranallo and Nigel McGuinness, replacing Percy Watson; this marked her first time as full-time commentator, and her first time commenting matches that did not involve women. Her first NXT TakeOver as announcer was NXT TakeOver: XXV on June 1, 2019. She was a member of the commenting team when NXT started airing live on September 18, 2019, and was extended from a 50-minutes runtime to 120 minutes.

Phoenix returned to the ring for the first time since the previous year's WrestleMania during the Women's Royal Rumble match at the 2020 Royal Rumble event as the nineteenth entrant, lasting over 23 minutes before being eliminated by Shayna Baszler and finishing in third place. She suffered a head injury early in the match when Bianca Belair slapped her chest and caused the back of Phoenix's neck to hit one of the ring posts around the ring, but was able to finish the match.

On the March 2 edition of Raw, Phoenix would make an appearance to provide a medical update on her husband Edge, who had been injured by Randy Orton. However, Orton would interrupt and explain his actions, which caused Phoenix to slap and kick Orton, who retaliated by hitting her with an RKO.

==== Sporadic appearances (2022–2024) ====
At WWE Day 1, Phoenix returned to help her husband Edge win a match against The Miz. The couple then started a feud with The Miz and Maryse which resulted in a mixed tag team match at the Royal Rumble, Phoenix and Edge were victorious. On the August 22, 2022, episode of Raw, Phoenix returned to watch Edge's match against Damian Priest. After the match, The Judgment Day (Priest, Finn Bálor and Rhea Ripley) attacked Edge, but Phoenix stepped in to stop the assault. She interfered in Edge's "I Quit" match against Bálor at Extreme Rules, but despite her efforts, Edge ultimately lost. When the match was over, Rhea Ripley attacked Phoenix with a violent Con-Chair-To, severely injuring her (kayfabe).

In 2023, Phoenix returned at Royal Rumble, spearing Ripley before walking off with Edge. She would appear on the following Raw to do the same when The Judgement Day attempted to interfere in Bálor's match against Cody Rhodes. On February 6, 2023, Phoenix and Edge challenged Rhea Ripley and Finn Bálor to a mixed tag team match at the Elimination Chamber premium live event. At the event on February 18, Phoenix and Edge were victorious despite interference from Dominik Mysterio. On August 15, 2024, Phoenix announced that her WWE Contract has just expired and became free agent during her interview with Chris Van Vliet, after it was originally reported by PWInsider on July 26, 2024.

=== All Elite Wrestling (2025, 2026) ===
Beth Copeland made her All Elite Wrestling (AEW) debut on September 20, 2025, at All Out, where she took out Stokley, which allowed her husband Adam Copeland and Christian Cage to defeat FTR (Cash Wheeler and Dax Harwood). After the match, Copeland was attacked by FTR while attempting to fight them off from attacking her husband. At Double or Nothing on May 24, Beth made another appearance to once again assist Adam and Cage defeated FTR, this time to win the AEW World Tag Team Championship.

== Other media ==
Phoenix, along with Candice Michelle and Layla El, appeared in the February 2009 issue of FLEX Magazine. Phoenix has appeared in 12 WWE video games. She made her in-game debut in WWE SmackDown vs. Raw 2009 and appears in WWE SmackDown vs. Raw 2010, WWE SmackDown vs. Raw 2011, WWE '12, WWE '13, WWE 2K18, WWE 2K19, WWE 2K20, WWE 2K Battlegrounds, WWE 2K22, WWE 2K23 and WWE 2K24.

On November 9, 2021, Copeland announced her debut EP, Stone Rose & Bone. It was released on all major streaming platforms on November 12, 2021, by WWE Music Group.

== Personal life ==
In 2001, she was married to Joey Carolan, known by the ring name Joey Knight, but they divorced in 2010.

In September 2011, she began a relationship with Adam Copeland, known in WWE as Edge, and in December 2013, their first daughter was born. Their second daughter was born in May 2016. The couple married on October 30, 2016.

== Championships and accomplishments ==
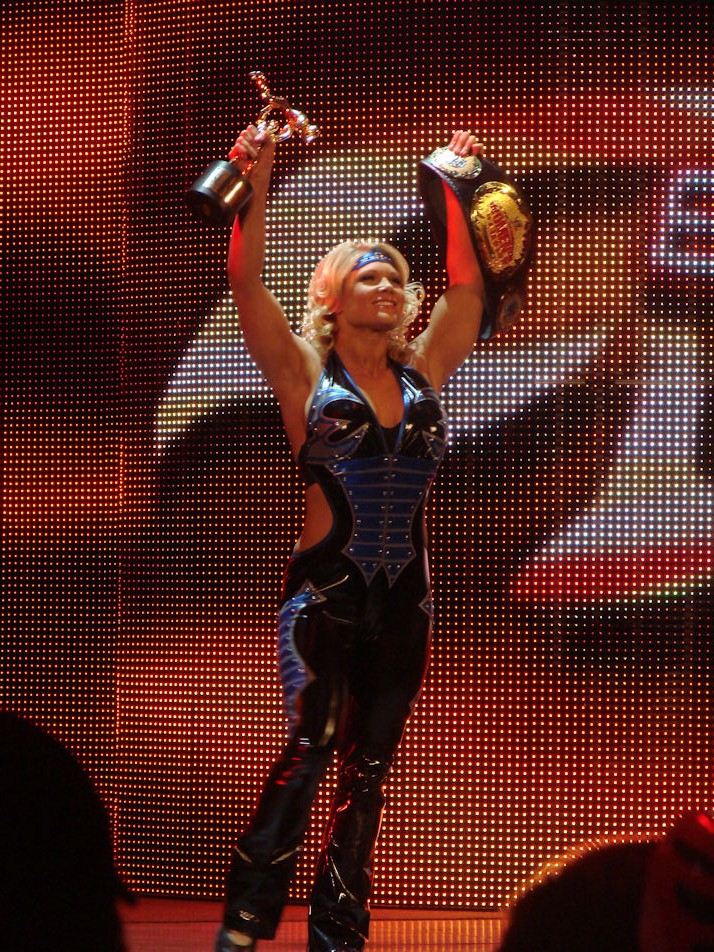
Phoenix won the 2008 Diva of the Year Slammy Award, and is a three-time WWE Women's Champion.

=== Amateur wrestling ===
- North-East Wrestling
  - Women's Champion (1999)
- New York State Fair
  - Women's Champion (1999)

=== Professional wrestling ===
- Cauliflower Alley Club
  - Women's Wrestling Award (2015)
- Far North Wrestling
  - FNW Cruiserweight Championship (1 time)
- George Tragos/Lou Thesz Professional Wrestling Hall of Fame
  - Frank Gotch Award (2015)
  - Class of 2019
- Glory Wrestling
  - Glory Championship (1 time)
- Ohio Valley Wrestling
  - OVW Women's Championship (1 time)^{[a]}
- Pro Wrestling Illustrated
  - Ranked No. 2 of the top 50 female wrestlers in the PWI Female 50 in 2008 and 2012
- World Wrestling Entertainment / WWE
  - WWE Divas Championship (1 time)
  - WWE Women's Championship (3 times)
  - WWE Hall of Fame (Class of 2017)
  - Slammy Award (1 time)
    - Diva of the Year (2008)

== Footnotes ==
^{a} During her reign, Phoenix lost the title to Victoria Crawford, later winning it back; Crawford's reign is not officially recognized by OVW, and therefore Phoenix is considered to have had a single, uninterrupted reign.
