= Survivor Series (2010) =

World Wrestling Entertainment pay-per-view event

- Promotional poster featuring Wade Barrett
- Promotion: World Wrestling Entertainment
- Brand(s): Raw; SmackDown
- Date: November 21, 2010
- City: Miami, Florida
- Venue: American Airlines Arena
- Attendance: 18,000
- Buy rate: 244,000

Pay-per-view chronology
← Previous; Bragging Rights	Next → TLC: Tables, Ladders & Chairs

Survivor Series chronology
← Previous; 2009	Next → 2011

The 2010 Survivor Series was a professional wrestling pay-per-view (PPV) event produced by World Wrestling Entertainment (WWE). It was the 24th annual Survivor Series and took place on November 21, 2010, at the American Airlines Arena in Miami, Florida, held for wrestlers from the promotion's Raw and SmackDown brand divisions. This was the second Survivor Series at the venue, after the 2007 event. It was also the last Survivor Series held under the first brand split, which ended in August 2011, but was reinstated in July 2016. The event was highlighted by the titular Survivor Series match, a tag team elimination match that pits teams of multiple wrestlers against each other.

Eight matches were contested at the event. In the main event, Randy Orton defeated Wade Barrett to retain Raw's WWE Championship with John Cena as the special guest referee. As per the stipulation of the match, since Orton won, Cena was (kayfabe) fired from WWE. Also on the card, Kane defended SmackDown's World Heavyweight Championship against Edge, but the match ended in a draw. The card also included one Survivor Series match, in which Team Mysterio (Rey Mysterio, Big Show, Chris Masters, Kofi Kingston, and Montel Vontavious Porter) defeated Team Del Rio (Alberto Del Rio, Cody Rhodes, Drew McIntyre, Jack Swagger, and Tyler Reks).

== Production ==
=== Background ===
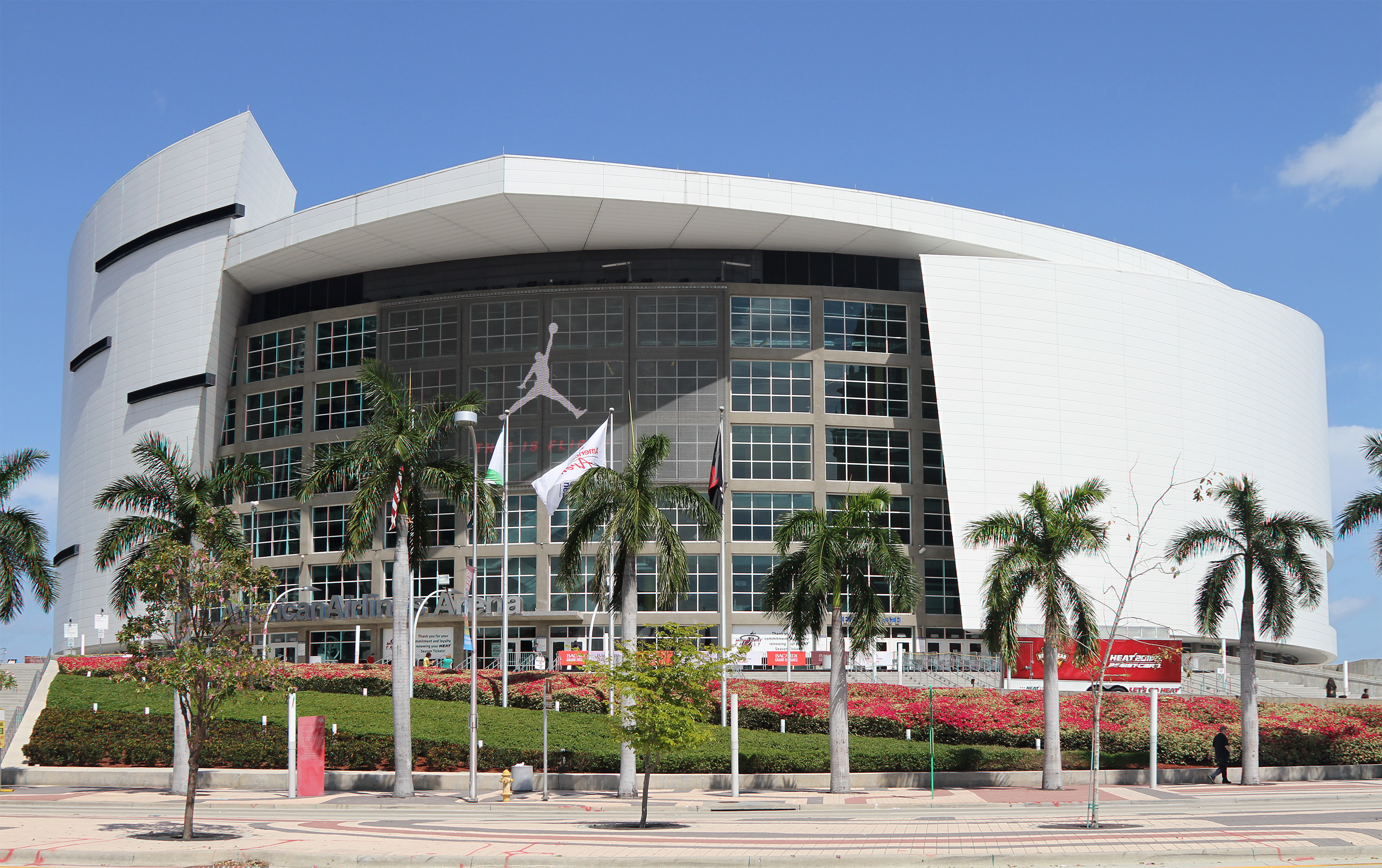
The 24th annual Survivor Series was the second time for the event to be held at the American Airlines Arena in Miami, Florida, after 2007.

Survivor Series is an annual professional wrestling pay-per-view (PPV) event, produced every November by World Wrestling Entertainment (WWE) since 1987, generally held around Thanksgiving in the United States. In what has become the second longest-running pay-per-view event in history (behind WWE's WrestleMania), it is one of the promotion's original four pay-per-views, along with WrestleMania, SummerSlam, and Royal Rumble, referred to as the "Big Four". The event is traditionally characterized by having Survivor Series matches, which are tag team elimination matches that typically pits teams of four or five wrestlers against each other. The 24th Survivor Series event was scheduled to be held on November 21, 2010, at the American Airlines Arena in Miami, Florida, and featured wrestlers from the Raw and SmackDown brand divisions. This was the second Survivor Series at the venue, after the 2007 event.

Survivor Series was originally set to end with the 2009 event as during a press conference held on February 11, 2010, WWE Chief Executive Officer and Chairman Vince McMahon announced that WWE would drop the Survivor Series name and rebrand the event. However, following public outcry and several different fan petitions, the event was later reinstated, and in June 2010, WWE started to release tickets for the 2010 event.

=== Storylines ===
Survivor Series featured professional wrestling matches involving different wrestlers from pre-existing scripted feuds, plots, and storylines that were played out on WWE's television programs, Raw and SmackDown.

The main rivalry from Raw involved The Nexus leader Wade Barrett against Randy Orton for his WWE Championship with Nexus member John Cena as the special guest referee. At Hell in a Cell, two months earlier, Cena lost a match against Barrett, forcing Cena to join Nexus. His main priority as a member of Nexus was to help Barrett secure the WWE Championship from Randy Orton, having Cena help Barrett during a Battle Royal to name a number one contender and forcing Cena to help him during his match against Orton at Bragging Rights. At that match, if Barrett did not win the match, he would have Cena fired for breaking their stipulation from their match at Hell in a Cell. However, Cena attacked Barrett during the match, giving him the win via disqualification, though Orton still retained the title. The next day on Raw, when Cena won a match against Orton via disqualification, Barrett named Cena the special guest referee for their match at Survivor Series. This time, if Barrett did not win the title, then he would have Cena fired, but as an incentive for Cena to perform his duty, if Barrett did win the title, Barrett would relieve Cena from his obligation to Nexus. On the November 8 episode of Raw, the Anonymous Raw General Manager made the stipulation that the match could only be won via pinfall or submission; in addition, the other members of The Nexus would be banned from ringside.

The main rivalry from SmackDown involved Kane against Edge for Kane's World Heavyweight Championship. After defeating his half-brother The Undertaker last month at Bragging Rights after their three-month war, Alberto Del Rio, Rey Mysterio, and Edge all interfered in Kane's "funeral" for the Undertaker. Afterwards, all three competed in a match against each other for a number one contender spot. At the end of the match, Edge came out victorious and thus became the number one contender against Kane at Survivor Series. Over the next weeks, Edge kidnapped and psychologically tormented Kane's storyline father Paul Bearer.

== Event ==
Other on-screen personnel
Role:	Name:
English commentators	Michael Cole
English commentators	Jerry Lawler
English commentators	Matt Striker
Spanish commentators	Carlos Cabrera
Spanish commentators	Hugo Savinovich
Interviewer	Josh Matthews
Ring announcers	Justin Roberts
Ring announcers	Tony Chimel
Referees	Mike Chioda
Referees	Charles Robinson
Referees	John Cone
Referees	Jack Doan
Referees	Justin King
Referees	Chad Patton
Referees	John Cena (Orton vs. Barrett)

Prior to Survivor Series coming on the air, R-Truth (with Eve Torres) defeated Zack Ryder in a dark match.

=== Preliminary matches ===
In the first match, Daniel Bryan faced Ted DiBiase (with Maryse) for the United States Championship. DiBiase dominated in the beginning utilizing various veteran moves. He then threw Bryan to the outside with a suplex off the apron. Back in the ring, DiBiase attempted Dream Street but Bryan countered and locked in the LeBell Lock, and made DiBiase submit.

Next, John Morrison faced Sheamus. The two opponents exchanged punches and kicks, until Sheamus missed a Bicycle Kick, which landed his legs between the top rope. Morrison capitalized, delivering the Flying Chuck. With Sheamus in a seated position, Morrison delivered a running knee to Sheamus and pinned him for the win.

After that, Dolph Ziggler (with Vickie Guerrero) defended the Intercontinental Championship against Kaval. Kaval dominated at first with a series of kicks and even almost put Ziggler away with a diving Moonsault. Ziggler came back after delivering a leg drop bulldog, yet only got a two count. Kaval then attempted an inverted roll-up pin, but Ziggler countered by rolling him up, grabbing his tights for leverage and retained the title.

Later, Team Mysterio (Rey Mysterio, Kofi Kingston, Chris Masters, Big Show, and Montel Vontavious Porter) faced Team Del Rio (Alberto Del Rio, Tyler Reks, Drew McIntyre, Jack Swagger, and Cody Rhodes) in a 5-on-5 Traditional Survivor Series Elimination Match. McIntyre eliminated MVP after Del Rio held MVP's foot down. Del Rio eliminated Masters after Masters tapped out to the Cross Armbreaker. Del Rio was eliminated after Big Show hit him with a KO Punch, knocking out Del Rio and making him unable to continue the match, causing him to be carried to the back of the arena by WWE officials. Big Show pinned Rhodes after a KO Punch, eliminating Rhodes. Kingston eliminated Reks with a Schoolboy pin. Swagger eliminated Kingston after Kingston submitted to the Ankle Lock. Mysterio eliminated Swagger after a 619 and an aided Splash with Big Show. Big Show eliminated McIntyre after a 619 by Mysterio and a Chokeslam. As a result, Team Mysterio won the match.

In the fifth match, Natalya defeated Lay-Cool (Layla and Michelle McCool) in a two-on-one handicap match for the Divas Championship, winning the title for the first time. After the match, Beth Phoenix returned to WWE and rescued Natalya from Lay-Cool, who attacked Natalya.

Next, Kane and Edge for the World Heavyweight Championship fought to a draw after both competitors had their shoulders pinned down on the canvas. As a result, Kane retained the title. After the match, Edge attacked Kane by putting him in a wheelchair and pushing him through the fan barrier.

In the seventh match, The Nexus (Justin Gabriel and Heath Slater) (with David Otunga, Michael McGillicutty, and Husky Harris) retained their WWE Tag Team Championship defeating Santino Marella and Vladimir Kozlov, after The Nexus interfered in the match.

=== Main event ===
The main event was Randy Orton defending the WWE Championship against Wade Barrett with John Cena as the special guest referee in a free or fired match. The match can only be won by pinfall or submission, and The Nexus was banned from ringside. In the end, Cena pushed Barrett into a RKO, allowing Orton to retain the title, and because of the stipulations of the match, John Cena was fired. Cena thanked Michael Cole and the fans on his way to the back to close the show.

== Reception ==
The event was generally well received by critics. The pay-per-view drew 244,000 buys, up from the 235,000 that the previous year's event received.

== Aftermath ==
=== Raw ===
The following night on Raw, Cena thanked the WWE Universe and was given an ovation by other wrestlers backstage as he exited the arena. Barrett taunted him on his way out. Also on that episode, Wade Barrett demanded a rematch against Randy Orton for the WWE Championship. During the match, John Cena (who had been fired the previous night) attacked Barrett, costing him the match. Immediately after this match, The Miz cashed in his Money in the Bank briefcase and defeated Orton to become the new WWE Champion. At TLC: Tables, Ladders & Chairs, The Miz successfully defended his title against Orton in a tables match.

With The Nexus having assaulted security, John Cena was free to enter the arena and attack any and all members of The Nexus. Eventually a mutiny formed within The Nexus, and they threatened to kick Wade Barrett out unless he rehired John Cena. Along with that, the rehiring of Cena was met under the condition that Barrett would face him in a Chairs match at TLC: Tables, Ladders & Chairs. Cena would go on to win the match at the pay-per-view.

After Survivor Series, the 2010 King of the Ring tournament took place, with John Morrison and Sheamus making their way to the finals. Sheamus would win, becoming the 2010 King of the Ring; he and Morrison would wrestle at TLC: Tables, Ladders & Chairs in a ladder match to determine the #1 contender for the WWE Championship, which Morrison would win.

Justin Gabriel and Heath Slater would lose the WWE Tag Team Championship to Santino Marella and Vladimir Kozlov. A rematch was granted at TLC: Tables, Ladders, & Chairs, but Marella and Kozlov would retain the titles.

=== SmackDown ===
On the following episode of SmackDown, Kane granted Edge a rematch for the championship in return that his storyline father Paul Bearer would be released from being hostage by Edge. Edge took the opportunity; however, Bearer would still be held hostage. Before the pay-per-view, Kane pushed what he thought was another dummy off of a ladder, only to discover it was actually Paul Bearer himself. At TLC: Tables, Ladders & Chairs, Kane was scheduled to defend his title in a Tables, Ladders, and Chairs match against Edge; However, Rey Mysterio and Alberto Del Rio, who were in a feud of their own, were added to the match courtesy of SmackDown GM Theodore Long, thus making it a fatal four-way. At TLC: Tables, Ladders & Chairs, Edge would go on to win the World Heavyweight Championship.

Natalya and Beth Phoenix's feud with LayCool led to a tag team tables match at TLC, which Natalya and Phoenix won.

=== Future ===
The 2010 event was the last Survivor Series held under the first brand split, which ended in August 2011. However, the brand split would be reintroduced in July 2016, and the theme of Survivor Series became brand supremacy, featuring the brands in direct competition with each other until 2021. Additionally, in April 2011, the promotion ceased using its full name with the "WWE" abbreviation becoming an orphaned initialism.

== Results ==
No.	Results	Stipulations	Times
1^{D}	R-Truth (with Eve Torres) defeated Zack Ryder by pinfall	Singles match	—
2	Daniel Bryan (c) defeated Ted DiBiase Jr. (with Maryse) by submission	Singles match for the WWE United States Championship	9:58
3	John Morrison defeated Sheamus by pinfall	Singles match	11:11
4	Dolph Ziggler (c) (with Vickie Guerrero) defeated Kaval by pinfall	Singles match for the WWE Intercontinental Championship	9:32
5	Team Mysterio (Rey Mysterio, Big Show, Chris Masters, Kofi Kingston, and Montel Vontavious Porter) defeated Team Del Rio (Alberto Del Rio, Cody Rhodes, Drew McIntyre, Jack Swagger, and Tyler Reks)	5-on-5 Survivor Series match	18:12
6	Natalya defeated LayCool (Michelle McCool (c) and Layla) by submission	Handicap match for the WWE Divas Championship	3:38
7	Kane (c) vs. Edge ended in a draw	Singles match for the World Heavyweight Championship	12:50
8	The Nexus (Heath Slater and Justin Gabriel) (c) (with David Otunga, Husky Harris, and Michael McGillicutty) defeated Santino Marella and Vladimir Kozlov by pinfall	Tag team match for the WWE Tag Team Championship	5:11
9	Randy Orton (c) defeated Wade Barrett by pinfall	Pinfall or Submission only Singles match for the WWE Championship; John Cena was the special guest referee and The Nexus were banned from ringside. Since Orton won, Cena was fired. Had Barrett won, Cena would have been free from The Nexus.	15:10
(c) / – the champion(s) heading into the match; D / – this was a dark match

=== Survivor Series match ===
Eliminated	Wrestler	Eliminated by	Method	Time
1	Montel Vontavious Porter	Drew McIntyre	Pinned after Del Rio held MVP foot while McIntyre pinned him	05:36
2	Chris Masters	Alberto Del Rio	Cross Armbreaker	06:36
3	Alberto Del Rio	Big Show	Unable to continue	09:53
4	Cody Rhodes	Big Show	WMD	10:57
5	Tyler Reks	Kofi Kingston	Schoolboy Pin	15:08
6	Kofi Kingston	Jack Swagger	Ankle Lock	15:55
7	Jack Swagger	Rey Mysterio	Pinned after Rey hit a splash on Big Shows shoulders	17:35
8	Drew McIntyre	Big Show	Chokeslam	18:12
Survivor(s):	Rey Mysterio and Big Show (Team Mysterio)			18:12
