= WWE Hall of Fame (2017) =

WWE Hall of Fame induction ceremony

- Promotional poster featuring wrestlers inducted into the WWE Hall of Fame class of 2017
- Promotion: WWE
- Date: March 31, 2017
- City: Orlando, Florida
- Venue: Amway Center

WWE Hall of Fame chronology
| ← Previous; 2016 | Next → 2018 |

WWE Hall of Fame (2017) was the event which featured the introduction of the 18th class to the WWE Hall of Fame. The event was produced by WWE on March 31, 2017, from the Amway Center in Orlando, Florida. The event took place the same weekend as WrestleMania 33. This was the first time the Hall of Fame ceremony was not held the night before WrestleMania instead NXT TakeOver: Orlando was held the night before WrestleMania. The event aired live on the WWE Network, and was hosted by Jerry Lawler. A condensed one-hour version of the ceremony aired the following Monday after Raw on the USA Network.

== Background ==
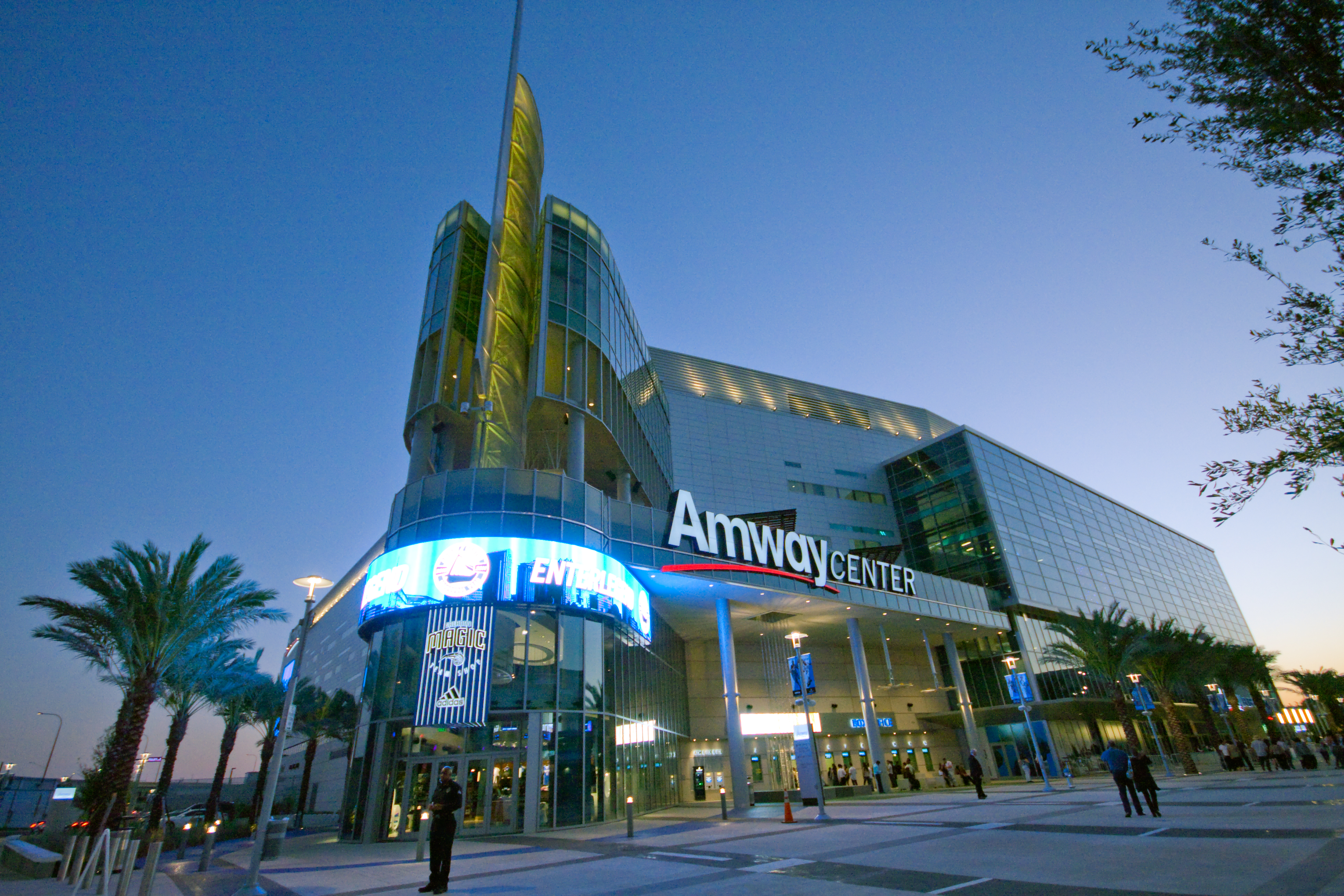
The event was held at the Amway Center in Orlando, Florida.

On January 16, 2017, WWE announced that Angle would be inducted into the WWE Hall of Fame. As a celebrated amateur wrestler, Angle had an aversion to professional wrestling, considering it "beneath" him. He was offered a 10-year contract with the World Wrestling Federation (WWF) following the 1996 Olympics, but talks fell apart when he told company chairman Vince McMahon that he would be unwilling to lose any matches. Angle's opinion of professional wrestling changed when he began watching the WWF's Monday Night Raw in 1998: he observed "world class athletes doing very athletic things", and developed an admiration for Stone Cold Steve Austin's talents as an entertainer. Angle later conceded that his negative attitude toward the industry was misguided and "stupid". Angle was signed to a five-year deal by August 1998, following a three-day tryout. On August 25, 2006, Angle was granted an early release from his WWE contract because of health reasons. Angle stated in the Kurt Angle: Champion documentary DVD that he asked for his release from WWE because he could not take time off and was working hurt, severely on some occasions. He also stated that when he quit, WWE lost their top talent, as he was at the very top of the payroll. Following his release, Angle did not reappear on any WWE programming until his Hall of Fame induction.

== Event ==
Due to the launch of the WWE Network shortly before WrestleMania XXX, this event featured the fourth "Red Carpet" event as a one-hour pre-show prior to the start of the event. Michael Cole and Maria Menounos hosted the pre-show.

In 2016, WWE introduced a new category for the Hall of Fame called the "Legacy" wing. Inductees under this new category feature wrestlers from the early years of professional wrestling, primarily during the early part of the 20th century. All inductees in 2017 were inducted posthumously and were recognized with a video package at the ceremony. Those inducted in the 2017 legacy category were Martin "Farmer" Burns, June Byers, Haystacks Calhoun, Judy Grable, Dr. Jerry Graham, Luther Lindsay, Joseph "Toots" Mondt, Rikidōzan, and Bearcat Wright.

Following The Ultimate Warrior's death in April 2014, WWE introduced the Warrior Award, in 2015, for those who have "exhibited unwavering strength and perseverance, and who lives life with the courage and compassion that embodies the indomitable spirit of the Ultimate Warrior." As is the normal case, his widow Dana Hellweg presented the award. The 2017 inductee was Eric LeGrand. LaGrand was recognized for being a former Rutgers University football player. After LeGrand was paralyzed in 2010, rather than letting it defeat him, he became a motivational speaker.

Theodore Long was inducted by his long time travel-mates The APA (John "Bradshaw" Layfield and Ron Simmons). During the induction ceremony Layfield and Simmons shared memories of Long on the road, how he never was willing to pay for anything, and how much money he owed them.

Diamond Dallas Page was inducted by his former boss Eric Bischoff. During his induction speech, Page spoke about how much Dusty Rhodes, who had died two years prior, meant to him, and helped guide his career.

Natalya inducted her best friend Beth Phoenix. The two shared stories of how their careers started and how much the other meant to them and how it got them both where they are too. Phoenix went to introduce her husband however she was interrupted by Tony Chimel who offered to help her, and then announced Edge. Phoenix also shared stories about Edge and stories of them from before they retired.

"Ravishing" Rick Rude was inducted by Ricky Steamboat. Due to Rude's passing in 1999, Rude's induction was posthumously accepted by his widow Michelle and his two surviving children, daughter Merissa and son Rick Rood Jr.

The Rock 'n' Roll Express members Ricky Morton and Robert Gibson were inducted by Jim Cornette. Cornette shared stories of managing them during their early years. Gibson and Morton discussed what it was like to travel with each other for so many years, and discussed how they are as close as brothers.

Kurt Angle was the final member to be inducted, with his induction being done by John Cena (who had debuted against Angle back in 2002). This event marked Angle's return to the WWE after an over 10-year absence (most of which he spent working with rival promotion TNA). Angle roasted himself during his speech, referencing many of his old bits, including singing "I'm Just a Sexy Kurt" (his version of Shawn Michaels' theme) and finished by chugging two bottles of milk (a Stone Cold Steve Austin-inspired taunt he had previously done once in 2001 as part of his milk-based re-enactment of Austin giving The Corporation a beer bath in 1999).

== Aftermath ==
On the April 3 episode of Raw after WrestleMania, Angle made his first WWE appearance in nearly 11 years after Mr. McMahon appointed Angle as the new general manager of Raw. On October 20, WWE announced Angle's in-ring return after 11 years, replacing Roman Reigns due to medical issues and teaming with Dean Ambrose and Seth Rollins to face The Miz, Cesaro, Sheamus, Braun Strowman, and Kane in a 5-on-3 handicap Tables, Ladders, and Chairs match at TLC: Tables, Ladders & Chairs.

== Inductees ==
=== Individual ===
- Class headliners appear in **boldface**

| Image | Ring name (Birth Name) | Inducted by | WWE recognized accolades |
|---|---|---|---|
| | **Kurt Angle** | John Cena | Four-time WWF/WWE Champion; One-time World Heavyweight Champion; One-time WCW Champion; One-time WWF Intercontinental Champion; One-time WWF European Champion; One-time WCW United States Champion; One-time WWE Tag Team Champion; 2000 King of the Ring winner |
| | Theodore Long | The APA (John "Bradshaw" Layfield and Ron Simmons) | Longtime referee, manager, and on-screen authority figure in WCW and WWE |
| | Diamond Dallas Page (Page Falkinburg) | Eric Bischoff | Three-time WCW World Heavyweight Champion; Two-time WCW United States Heavyweight Champion; One-time WWF Tag Team Champion; One-time WWF European Champion; Four-time WCW World Tag Team Champion |
| | Beth Phoenix (Elizabeth Kocianski) | Natalya | One-time WWE Divas Champion; Three-time WWE Women's Champion; 2008 Slammy Award winner for Diva of the Year |
| | "Ravishing" Rick Rude (Richard Rood) | Ricky Steamboat | Posthumous inductee: Represented by his widow Michelle, his daughter Merissa and his son Rick Rood. Three-time WCW International World Heavyweight Champion; One-time WWF Intercontinental Champion; One-time WCW United States Heavyweight Champion |

=== Tag team ===
| Image | Group | Inducted by | WWE recognized accolades |
|---|---|---|---|
| | The Rock 'n' Roll Express | Jim Cornette | Four-time NWA World Tag Team Champions (Mid-Atlantic Version); Four-time NWA World Tag Team Champions; Ten-time SMW Tag Team Champions |
Ricky Morton (Richard Morton) - Two-time WCW World Six-Man Tag Team Champion, one-time NWA World Junior Heavyweight Champion; Robert Gibson (Ruben Gibson) - One-time SMW Beat the Champ Television Champion

=== Warrior Award ===
| Image | Recipient (Birth name) | Presented By | Notes |
|---|---|---|---|
| | Eric LeGrand | Dana Warrior | Former Rutgers University football player LeGrand was paralyzed during the 2010 game against Army. He has gone on to become a renowned motivational speaker. |

=== Legacy ===
| Image | Ring name (Birth name) | WWE recognized accolades |
|---|---|---|
| | Martin Burns | One-time American Heavyweight Champion |
| | June Byers (DeAlva Sibley) | One-time NWA World Women's Champion; One-time AWA World Women's Champion; Final Women's World Champion |
| | Haystacks Calhoun (William Calhoun) | One-time WWWF World Tag Team Champion |
| | Judy Grable (Nellya Baughman) | Challenged The Fabulous Moolah for the NWA World Women's Championship |
| —N/a | Dr. Jerry Graham (Jerry Matthews) | Four-time NWA United States Tag Team Champion; One-time WWWF United States Tag Team Champion |
| —N/a | Luther Lindsay (Luther Goodall) | The first African-American to challenge for the NWA World Heavyweight Championship |
| —N/a | Toots Mondt | As a promoter he was part of the Gold Dust Trio and controlled the Capitol Wrestling Corporation, the precursor to WWE |
| | Rikidōzan (Mitsuhiro Momota) | One-time NWA International Heavyweight Champion |
| | Bearcat Wright (Edward Wright) | One-time WWA World Heavyweight Champion; Credited by WWE as "being a key figure in the desegregation of the sports-entertainment industry" |
