= Eve Torres =

American professional wrestler

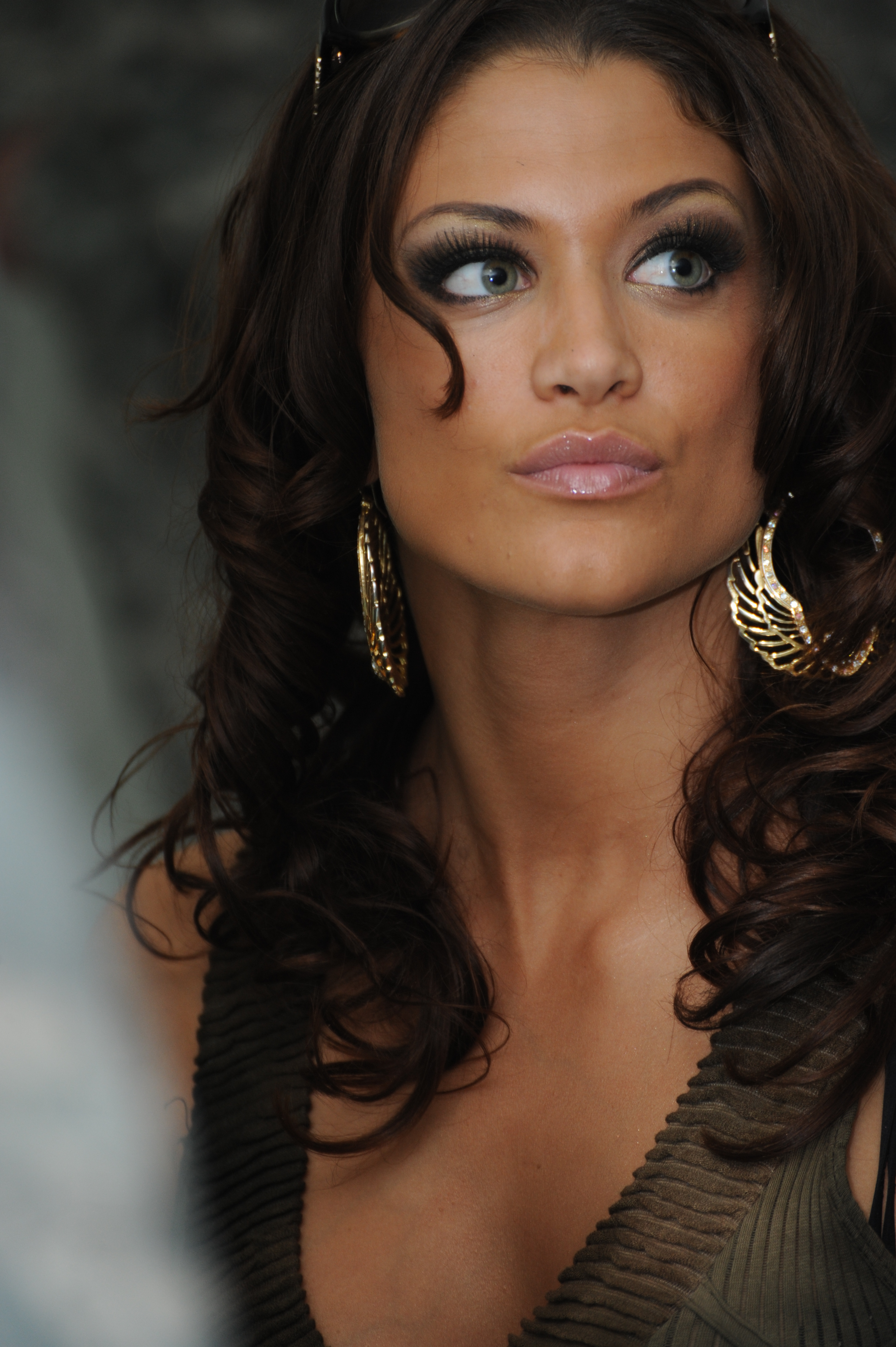
- Torres in 2008

Personal information
- Born: Eve Marie Torres; August 21, 1984 (age 41) Boston, Massachusetts, U.S.
- Spouse: Rener Gracie (m. 2014)
- Children: 2
- Family: Gracie

Professional wrestling career
- Ring name(s): Eve; Eve Torres
- Billed height: 5 ft 8 in (173 cm)
- Billed weight: 135 lb (61 kg)
- Billed from: Denver, Colorado; Los Angeles, California
- Trained by: Dave Finlay; Florida Championship Wrestling
- Debut: August 9, 2008
- Retired: January 14, 2013

Eve Torres Gracie (born Eve Marie Torres on August 21, 1984) is an American actress, dancer, model, martial arts instructor and former professional wrestler. She is signed to WWE, as an ambassador.

Torres began her career as a model and dancer. She danced for The Southern California Summer Pro League and went on to become a member of the National Basketball Association's Los Angeles Clippers Spirit Dance Team for the 2006–2007 season. She also appeared on several television shows, including Show Me The Money, Sunset Tan, and Deal or No Deal.

In 2007, she won the 2007 Diva Search, earning a contract with WWE. Torres first appeared on WWE programming as a backstage interviewer in 2008 and became a full-time wrestler in 2009. She won the WWE Divas Championship in April 2010. She held the championship on two further occasions, becoming the first person to win it three times. Following her retirement from professional wrestling in 2013, Torres focused on her role as an instructor for the Gracie Women Empowered self-defense program at the Gracie Jiu-Jitsu Academy in Torrance, California, and continued to act, with roles in Skiptrace and Supergirl.

== Early life ==
Eve Marie Torres was born on August 21, 1984 in Boston, Massachusetts, and grew up in Denver, Colorado. Her father is Euro-Nicaraguan and her mother is of German and Swedish descent. She has a younger brother, Phil, who is an Explorer and biologist.

Torres attended the University of Southern California (USC) on a full tuition scholarship. During college, she was one of the founding members of the Omega Phi Beta sorority chapter on her campus and held the vice-president position for several years. While in Omega Phi Beta, Torres was awarded for Academic Excellence at the Order of Omega Greek Awards. She graduated with honors and a grade point average above 3.5 in May 2006, with a degree in Industrial and Systems Engineering.

== Dancing and modeling career ==
While attending USC, Torres appeared in commercials and music videos. Torres was the co-captain of the USC Fly Girls dance squad and created much of their choreography. She also danced for The Southern California Summer Pro League, the only summer league for National Basketball Association (NBA) players, in Long Beach, California. After graduating from college, she began dancing and modeling full-time. After reaching the tryout finals in previous years, Torres became a member of the NBA's Los Angeles Clippers Spirit Dance Team for the 2006–07 season. She also appeared on the game show Show Me The Money.

== Professional wrestling career ==
=== World Wrestling Entertainment/WWE ===
==== Diva Search (2007–2008) ====
In May 2007, Torres entered World Wrestling Entertainment (WWE)'s Diva Search. She was chosen by WWE officials as one of the eight finalists from a group of 50 women. On October 29, 2007, in Philadelphia, live on Raw, she was crowned the 2007 WWE Diva Search winner, defeating finalist Brooke Gilbertsen and becoming a WWE Diva. Following her win, she began training for her wrestling debut in WWE's developmental territory, Ohio Valley Wrestling (OVW).

==== Early feuds (2008–2010) ====
Videos promoting Eve's debut on SmackDown! began airing on January 11, 2008. The promo aired for three weeks before Eve made her official debut on the February 1, 2008 episode of SmackDown interviewing Batista. During early 2008, Eve participated in a contest to determine the top Diva on SmackDown, participating in a bikini contest, an obstacle course, and an arm wrestling competition before being eliminated. Eve appeared at WrestleMania XXIV as a Lumberjill in the BunnyMania match between Maria and Ashley against Beth Phoenix and Melina. Eve spent the rest of the year competing in similar contests, including a dance-off and a bikini contest, before participating in the Halloween Costume Contest on October 26 at the Cyber Sunday pay-per-view, where she was dressed as Raphael from the Teenage Mutant Ninja Turtles. On the 800th episode of Raw on November 3, 2008, Eve made her televised in-ring debut in a 16-Diva tag team match, which her team lost although she was never tagged in.

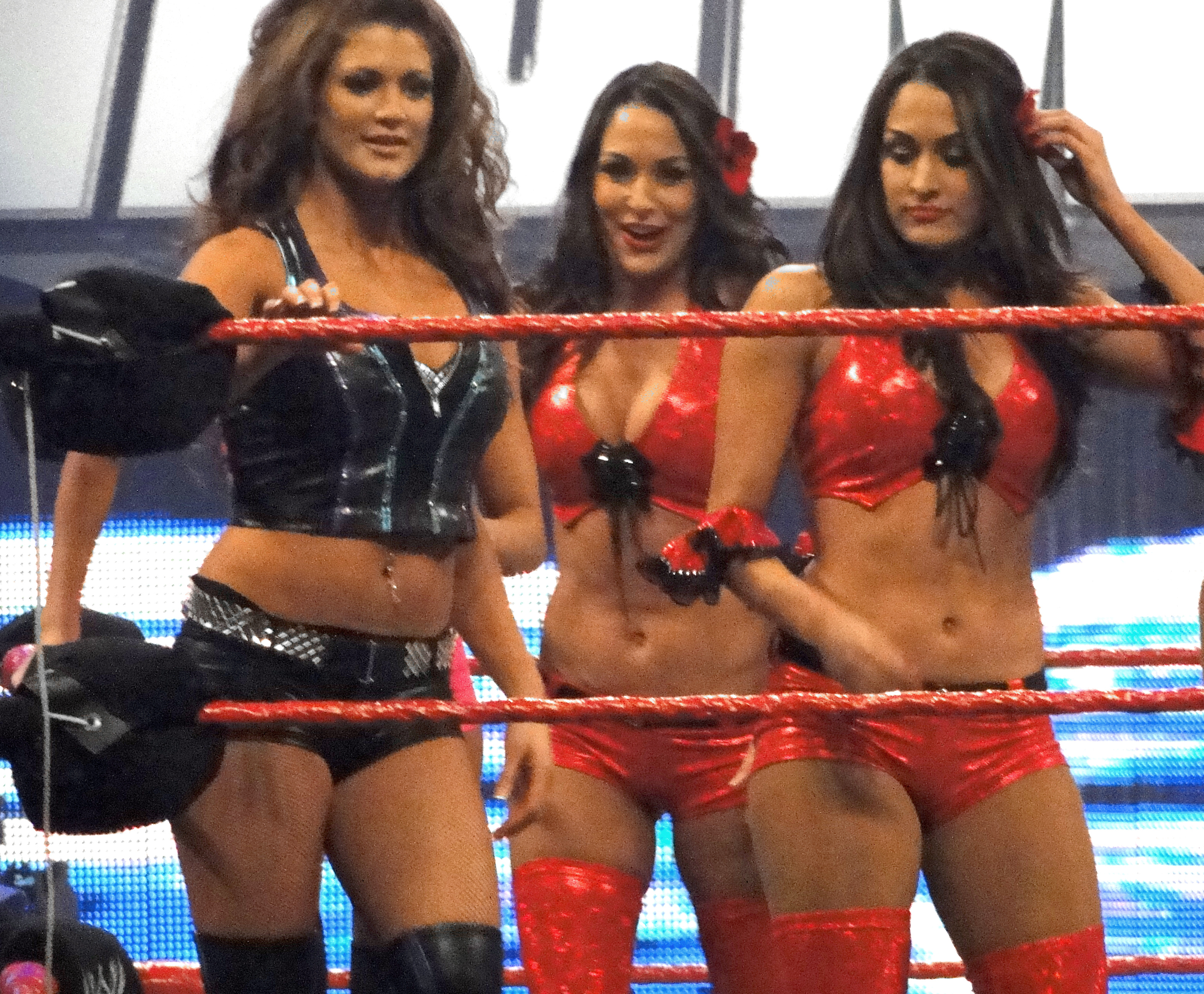
Eve (left) during a tag team match in 2010.

Her first main storyline began in early 2009, when she began a scripted feud with Michelle McCool after McCool attacked her. On the February 6 episode of SmackDown, Eve made her singles match debut in a losing effort against McCool via submission. Their feud continued for the next few months, with them competing against each other in singles and tag team matches. Eve then moved into a feud with Layla in mid-2009. After the pair competed in dance and arm wrestling competitions, Eve defeated Layla on the May 29 episode of SmackDown in a wrestling match. On the June 18 episode of Superstars, Eve pinned Layla once again. After the match, they both shook hands.

Around the same as her scripted rivalry with Layla, Eve became associated with Cryme Tyme (Shad and JTG), appearing in several backstage segments with them. She also began accompanying them to the ring as their manager during their storyline rivalry with The Hart Dynasty (David Hart Smith, Tyson Kidd, and Natalya). Eve and Cryme Tyme participated in multiple six-person mixed tag team matches against The Hart Dynasty, and Eve also faced Natalya in singles matches and tag team matches involving other Divas. Her final match on SmackDown was on October 9, when she was defeated in a singles match by McCool.

On October 12, 2009, Eve was traded to the Raw brand. On the November 2 episode of Raw, she competed in her first match after being traded: a battle royal which was won by Alicia Fox. She then entered into a storyline romance with Chris Masters in December 2009, becoming his valet, after Masters saved Eve from a confrontation with Chavo Guerrero. In a Christmas Edition of Raw, Eve kissed Chris Masters under the mistletoe after Masters defeated Carlito in a Single's match. Eve and Masters would continue their romantic storyline throughout early 2010 as the couple would share celebratory kisses and hugs after each match victory in the middle of the ring.

==== Divas Champion (2010–2011) ====
In January 2010, the WWE Divas Championship was vacated and a tournament was set up to determine the new champion. Eve made it to the semi-finals, before being defeated by the eventual winner, Maryse. At WrestleMania XXVI Eve was on the losing team in a 10-Diva tag team match, but the following night on Raw, she pinned Maryse in a rematch to earn the victory for her team.

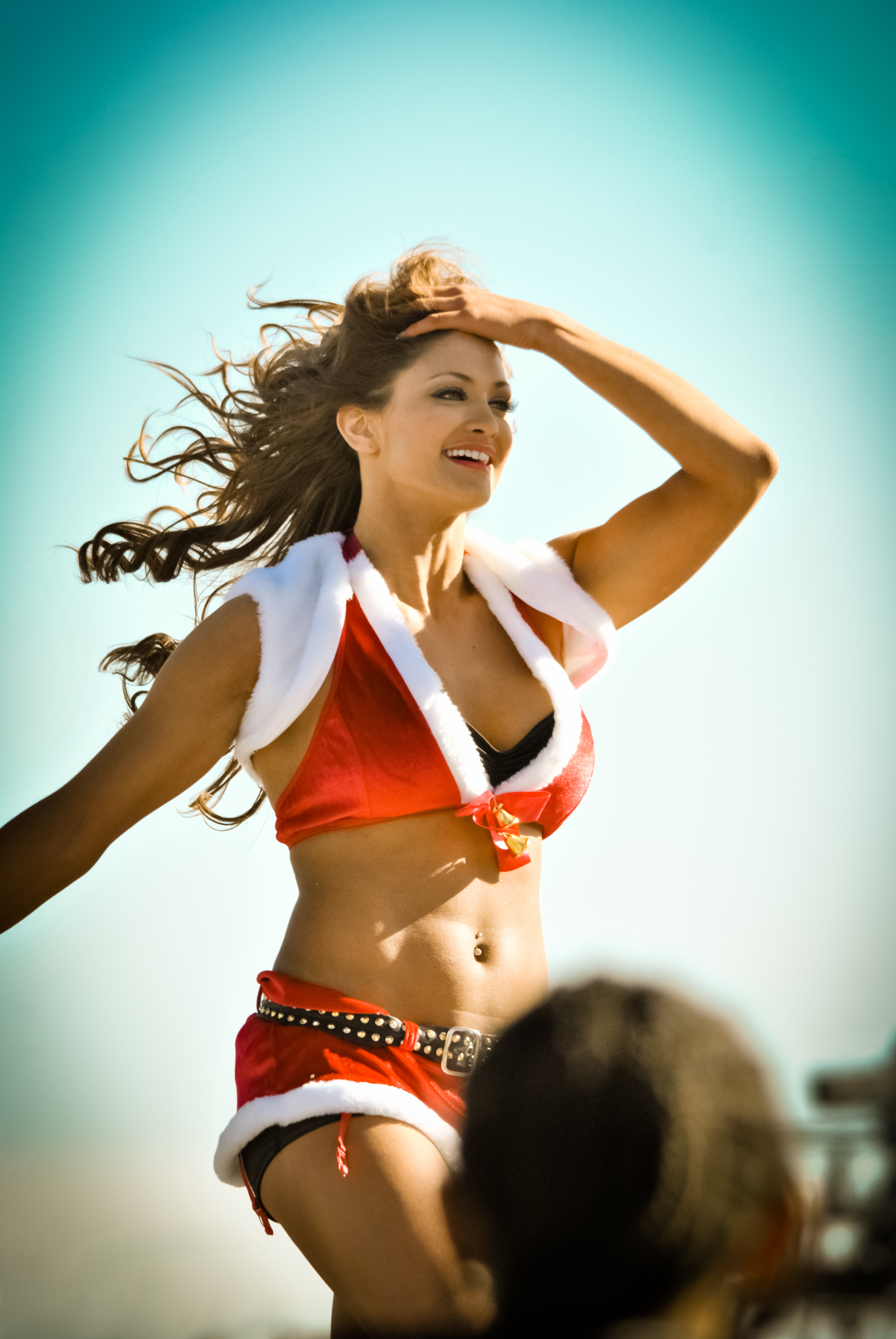
Eve (left) at the WWE Tribute to the Troops event in 2010.

On the April 5 episode of Raw, Eve won a "Dress to Impress" battle royal to become the number one contender to the WWE Divas Championship, and the following week on Raw, she defeated Maryse to win the championship for the first time. On the May 3 episode of Raw, Eve was involved in a backstage segment where she was knocked unconscious by Maryse during a photoshoot with her new title. Later on that night, after defeating Nikki Bella, Maryse humiliated Eve further by showing photos of herself posing with the very unconscious Eve and her Divas Championship belt. Eve successfully defended the championship against Maryse at the Over the Limit pay-per-view in May. At the Fatal 4-Way pay-per-view in June, Eve lost the championship in a fatal four-way match, when Alicia Fox pinned Maryse to win the championship. On the July 5 episode of Raw, Eve invoked her rematch clause against Fox but was unsuccessful after Fox feigned an ankle injury. As a result, she received another rematch at the Money in the Bank pay per-view, but lost again to Fox. In mid-2010 she began acting as the valet for R-Truth, entering another romantic storyline. The pair would enter a storyline feud with Ted DiBiase and Maryse.

At the Royal Rumble on January 30, 2011, the Raw General Manager added Eve to a two-on-one handicap match for the Divas Championship, turning it into a fatal four-way match. Eve pinned Layla to win the match and become a two-time Divas Champion. She retained the championship against Natalya in a Lumberjill match on the February 14 episode of Raw, and against Nikki Bella on the March 7 episode. She held the championship until the April 11 episode of Raw, when she lost it to Brie Bella.

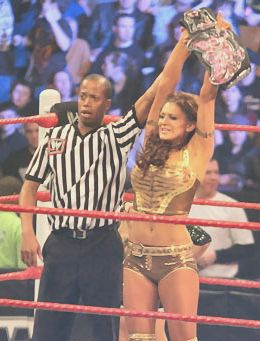
Torres after winning the WWE Divas Championship for the second time at the 2011 Royal Rumble.

Eve then formed an alliance with Kelly Kelly, and after Kelly won the Divas Championship in June, Eve accompanied her to the ring during her matches. Eve and Kelly began feuding with The Divas of Doom (Beth Phoenix and Natalya), and after Phoenix won the Divas Championship from Kelly, Eve defeated Natalya to earn a title match against Phoenix. She faced Phoenix at the Vengeance pay-per-view, but was unsuccessful. On the October 31 episode of Raw, Eve won a battle royal to become the number one contender to the Divas Championship. She received her championship match at the Survivor Series pay-per-view, but lost a Lumberjill match to Phoenix. She later described the match as her favorite.

==== Authority figure (2011–2012) ====
Eve moved into a storyline with Zack Ryder in December 2011, and the pair "won" a mixed tag team match against Natalya and Tyson Kidd on the December 26 episode of Raw. On the January 9, 2012 episode of Raw, Eve agreed to a date with Ryder beginning a storyline relationship. Eve quickly became involved in the storyline between Ryder, his ally John Cena, and Kane, who began targeting Ryder. After injuring Ryder, he turned his attention to Eve, and tried to attack her until he was stopped by Cena. On the February 6 episode of Raw, Eve suffered a legimiately broken nose when Beth Phoenix clotheslined her during a match. The following week, Cena saved Eve from being kidnapped by Kane, and Eve kissed him in thanks. On the February 20 episode of Raw, Eve became a villain after she confessed backstage to The Bella Twins that she had never liked Zack Ryder and didn't care about the injury he had suffered the previous week. She stated that she was using him for publicity and planned to take advantage of John Cena the same way. Cena overheard her revelation and scorned her as she begged for forgiveness. Eve justified her actions by stating that she had no problem using men to achieve her goals and that she was "a woman in a man's world." She wrestled her first match as a villain on the March 2 episode of SmackDown, defeating Natalya. Ryder returned on the March 5 episode of Raw, confronting Eve over her recent actions, but she managed to seduce him into forgiving her and the two shared a long backstage kiss. At WrestleMania XXVIII, Eve and Beth Phoenix lost to Kelly Kelly and Extra correspondent Maria Menounos in a tag team match. Later that night, she accompanied Ryder to the ring for the Team Johnny vs. Team Teddy matchup where she distracted Ryder, costing him and Team Teddy the match. After the match she publicly humiliated him by kicking him in the groin, sending him to his knees in agony.

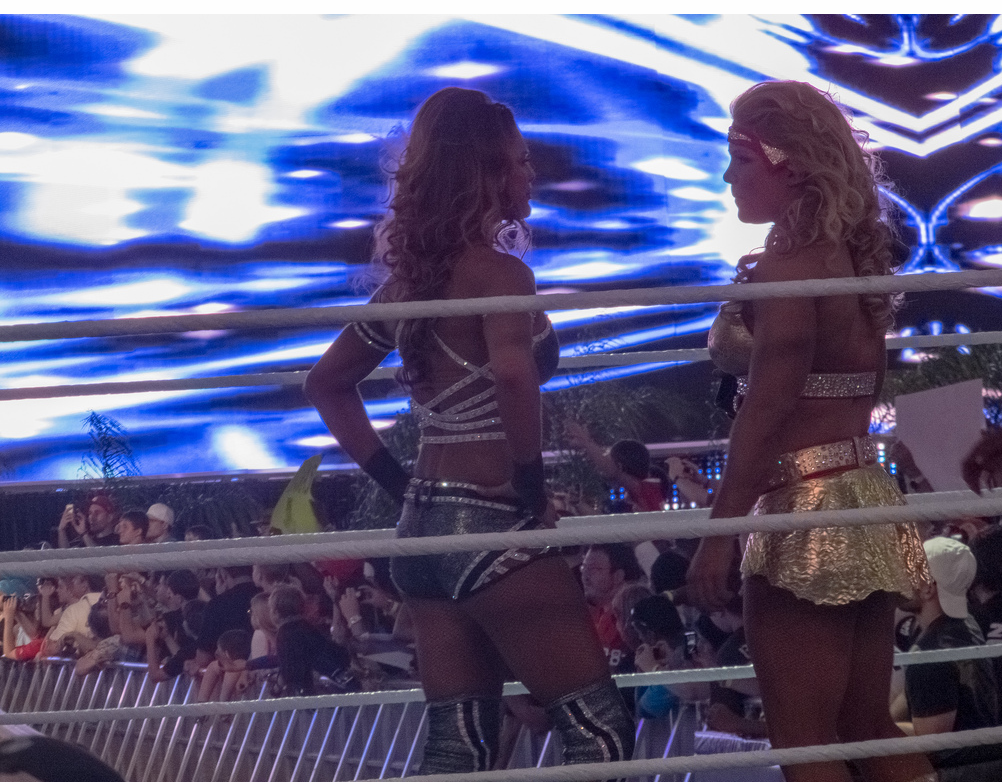
Torres (left) with Beth Phoenix at the Wrestlemania XXVIII pay-per-view in April 2012

As a result, John Laurinaitis gave her a position of authority by appointing her as the Executive Administrator of Raw and SmackDown. Eve found the role to be a power trip and enjoyed abusing her position by bullying and humiliating people on numerous occasions. One such occasion was on the April 30 episode of Raw, when Eve fired the Bella Twins with cruel glee. She also publicly humiliated The Big Show in the middle of the ring by making him apologise for mocking John Laurinaitis, and threatened his job if he didn't comply. However, it was former SmackDown General Manager Theodore Long who Eve seemed to take the most pleasure in bullying. After finding himself working for Laurinaitis after his team's loss at Wrestlemania, Long was told that he would now be working under Eve and would report to her, a situation she clearly enjoyed. As Eve's subordinate, the next few weeks were hell for Long. She took great pleasure in humiliating him by forcing him to do menial, degrading tasks; such as making him wear an apron and name tag at all times, like a maid. As well as stand guard by a door dressed as a Queen's soldier. She also enjoyed ordering him to get her coffee and would throw the coffee all over him if it wasn't to her satisfaction. Long was also forced by Eve to rub oil on Antonio Cesaro for a photoshoot, this was particularly humiliating for Teddy as it was in front of his ex love interest (and Cesaro's current girlfriend) the evil Aksana, who seemed to find Long's predicament extremely entertaining.

Despite her new authority figure role, she continued to participate in matches throughout mid-2012. Eve's power trip eventually ended in June 2012 at No Way Out when John Laurinaitis was fired, therefore her role as Executive Administrator ended. On the August 10 episode of SmackDown, Eve asked SmackDown General Manager Booker T if she could be his assistant, but Kaitlyn was given the job instead. Eve threatened Booker T that she would tell the Board of Directors about his discriminatory hiring practices and was given a match against Kaitlyn the following week. Eve won the match and the job.

==== Record-breaker and retirement (2012–2013) ====
In August, she began a storyline where she appeared friendly and nice, diminishing her villainous characteristics. As part of this apparent personality change, she shook hands with her rival Kaitlyn following a match and teamed with her and Layla on the September 10 episode of Raw. At the Night of Champions pay-per-view, Kaitlyn was attacked and injured by a masked figure; as a result, Eve replaced Kaitlyn in a match against Divas Champion Layla, which she won. Her victory made her the first woman to hold the Divas Championship on three occasions. After Kaitlyn revealed her attacker was blonde, Eve accused Beth Phoenix, and attacked her on the September 24 episode of Raw. The following week, Eve suspended Phoenix, pending an investigation into Kaitlyn's attack. On the October 8 episode of Raw, Eve defeated Kaitlyn via submission to retain the Divas Championship, and following the match, Eve reverted to her heel persona and attempted to re-injure Kaitlyn, but was stopped by Layla. The following week, she defeated Layla to retain the championship. After the reveal that Kaitlyn was attacked by Aksana, under Eve's orders, the three-way feud led to a match at the Hell in a Cell pay-per-view, where Eve retained the Divas Championship against Layla and Kaitlyn in a triple threat match. Eve continued to feud with the duo, facing them in tag team matches with multiple partners and defeating Kaitlyn at Survivor Series to retain the championship. On the December 10 episode of Raw, Eve defeated Alica Fox. After the match, Eve invited a ringside photographer into the ring to take photos of herself celebrating with the championship over the defeated Fox in an attempt to humiliate her.

At Tables, Ladders & Chairs, Eve stopped Kaitlyn from winning a number one contender's match, and defeated winner Naomi to retain the title. Kaitlyn won a non-title match against Eve, and won the subsequent title match by disqualification on December 18, however Eve retained the championship. The rematch occurred on the January 7, 2013 episode of Raw, in which Eve successfully defended the championship after losing by count-out. The following week, on the special "20th Anniversary" episode of Raw, Eve lost the Divas Championship to Kaitlyn. She quit immediately following the loss in storyline. In reality, Torres had asked for her release in December 2012 to plan her upcoming wedding and focus on her role as an instructor for the Gracie Women Empowered self-defense program. Torres was offered a role on the first season of E! reality series Total Divas by Triple H, with a proposed storyline that involved her WWE departure, which she ultimately declined.

==== Ambassador (2013–present) ====
On December 9, 2013, Torres appeared at the Slammy Award, presenting the Diva of the Year award to The Bella Twins. Since April 2014, she has served as an ambassador for WWE. Torres appeared on the June 19, 2017 episode of Table for 3 on WWE Network alongside Kelly Kelly and Maryse. Torres has also taught her self-defence classes and appeared as a guest speaker at the WWE Performance Center.

On October 28, 2018, Torres appeared on the pre-show for the first all-women's WWE pay-per-view, WWE Evolution, as well as in a video package during the main broadcast. In July 2019, Torres appeared on the Raw Reunion broadcast in a segment with Maria Kanellis, Mike Bennett, and Eric Bischoff, as well as during the finale in-ring at the end of the show with fellow WWE Legends.

== Other media ==
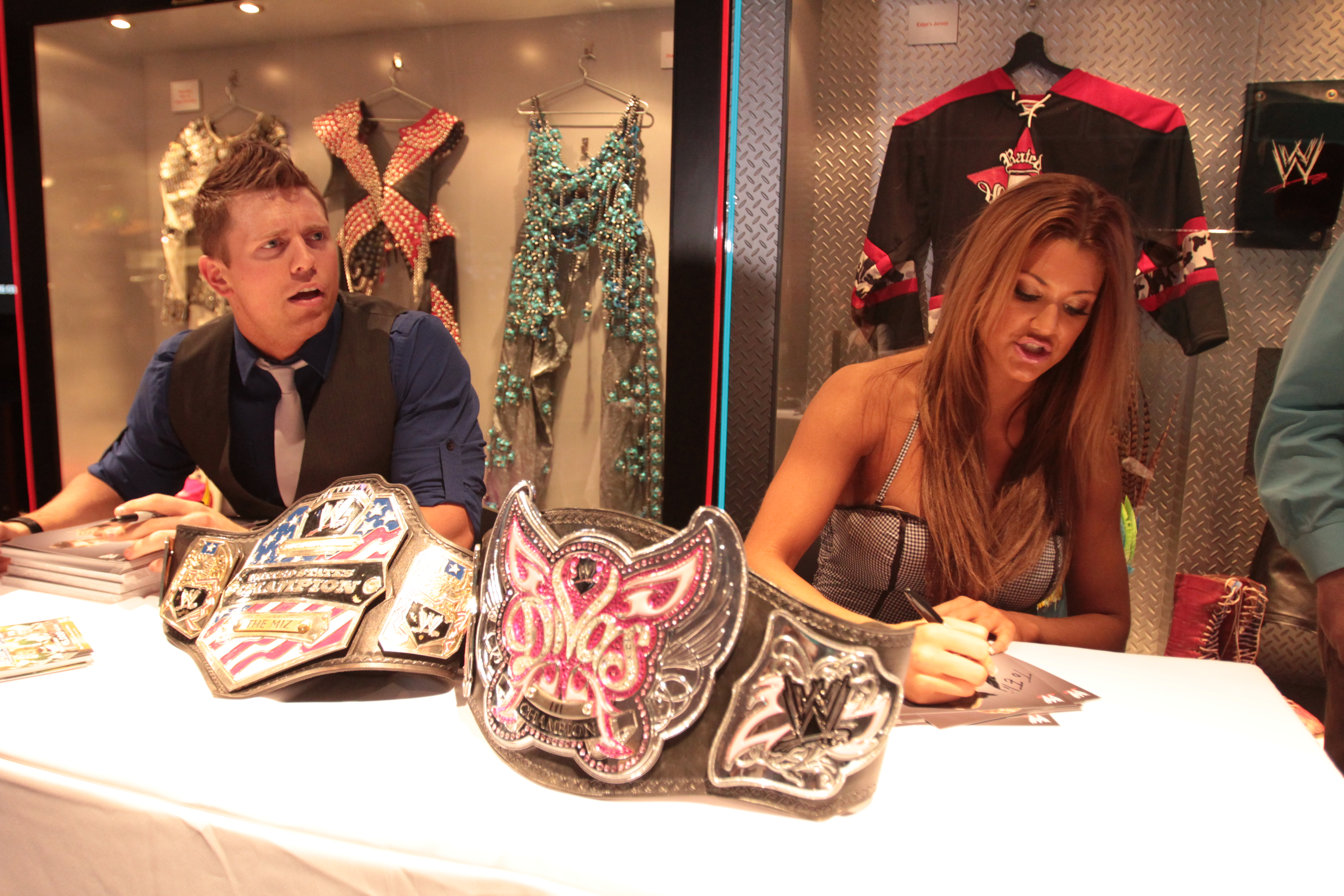
Torres with The Miz at an autograph signing during her first reign as WWE Divas Champion while The Miz was the then WWE United States Championship holder in 2010.

In August 2008, Torres, along with fellow WWE Divas Maria and Candice Michelle, appeared on an episode of Sunset Tan. On October 2, 2008, Torres and Maria appeared on a special episode of Magic's Biggest Secrets Finally Revealed. Torres appeared on the November 3, 2009 episode of Deal or No Deal with Maria and Dolph Ziggler. On July 1, 2012, Torres, Kelly, and Michelle McCool appeared on Extreme Weight Loss. In 2012, she was part of NBC's celebrity reality competition series called Stars Earn Stripes; she won the competition on September 3, earning over $100,000 for her charity, the United Service Organizations. On September 7, 2012, Torres appeared on G4's Attack of the Show for an interview.

Torres, along with Maryse and Michelle McCool, appeared in the January 2009 issue of Muscle & Fitness magazine.

On April 30, 2012, it was announced that Torres would be featured in the WWE Studios and Kare Production Project "Les reines du ring" (English: Queens of the Ring), alongside fellow wrestlers The Miz and CM Punk. In mid-2013, Torres filmed a role for the film The Scorpion King 4: Quest for Power, which was released in 2015. She later earned a role in Matador as Reyna Flores, a journalist reporting on the leading character's career. The show was cancelled after a single season. In 2016, Torres appeared in the film Skiptrace as a Russian assassin. The same year, she appeared in an episode of the Supergirl television series as Maxima.

== Filmography ==
=== Film ===
Year	Title	Role	Notes	Ref.
2013	Queens of the Ring	Herself		
2015	The Scorpion King 4: Quest for Power	Chancara		
2016	Skiptrace	Dasha	Credited as Eve Gracie	
2022	Diamond in the Rough	Eve		
2023	Last Wishes	Ines		

=== Video games ===
Year	Title	Role	Notes	Ref.
2009	WWE SmackDown vs. Raw 2010	Eve	Voice	
2010	WWE SmackDown vs. Raw 2011	Eve	Voice	
2011	WWE '12	Eve	Voice	
2012	WWE '13	Eve	Voice	
2023	WWE 2K23 (DLC)	Eve	Voice	
2024	WWE 2K24	Eve	Voice	
2025	WWE 2K25	Eve		
2014	WWE SuperCard	Eve	Voice - Mobile	
	WWE Universe	Eve	Voice - Mobile	

=== Television ===
Year	Title	Role	Notes	Ref.
2006	Show Me the Money	Eve	7 episodes (2 unaired)	
2007	The Best Damn Sports Show Period	Eve		
2007 - 2019	WWE Raw	Eve	138 Episodes	
2008	ECW on Sci-Fi	Eve	1 Episode	
2008	Sunset Tan	Eve		
2008	Magic's Biggest Secrets Finally Revealed	Eve		
2008 - 2012	WWE Smackdown!	Eve	76 Episodes	
2009	The 25th Anniversary of WrestleMania	Eve	TV Special	
2009	Deal or No Deal	Eve		
2009 - 2012	WWE Superstars	Eve	16 Episodes	
2010	WrestleMania XXVI	Eve	TV Special	
2010	WWE NXT	Eve	1 Episode	
2011	WrestleMania XXVII	Eve	TV Special	
2011	SummerSlam	Eve	TV Special	
2012	WrestleMania XXVIII	Eve	TV Special	
2012	Extreme Makeover: Weight Loss Edition	Eve	Special edition of "Diva's Boot Camp"	
2012	Stars Earn Stripes	Eve	Competed for the "USO" charity; Winner	
2012	Clash Time	Eve	3 Episodes	
2012	Attack of the Show!	Eve		
2012	The Soup	Eve		
2012	WWE Saturday Morning Slam	Eve	2 Episodes	
2014	Matador	Reyna Flores	6 Episodes	
2016	Supergirl	Maxima	Episode: "Myriad"	

== Personal life ==
As of April 2014, Torres is married to Rener Gracie, with whom she has two sons, Raeven, born in 2015 and Renson, born in 2018.

In 2023, Torres revealed that she learned in 2022 that several illnesses she had since 2013 resulted from her breast implants, with the ailments being described as "Breast Implant Illness." Upon hearing about this condition, Torres initially rejected the idea of her having Breast Implant Illness. However, she would eventually get her implants removed.

== Championships and accomplishments ==
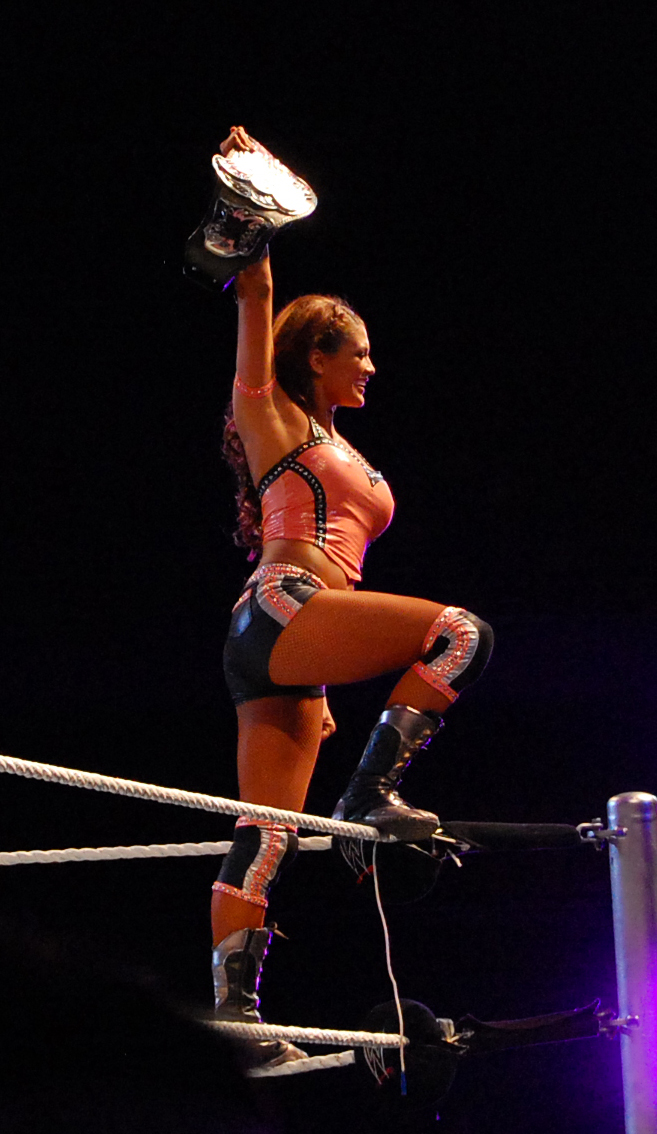
Eve Torres is a three-time WWE Divas Champion

- Inside The Ropes Magazine
  - Diva of the Year (2012) – First Diva Three-Times WWE Divas Champion
  - Feud of the Year (2010) - with Maryse
- Guinness World Records
  - World Record: Most wins of the WWE Divas Championship (3 times) tied with AJ Lee
- Pro Wrestling Illustrated
  - Ranked No. 5 of the Top 50 Female Wrestlers in the PWI Female 50 in 2010
- TJR Wrestling
  - Best Female Performer (2012)
- World Wrestling Entertainment / WWE
  - WWE Divas Championship (3 times)
  - WWE Diva Search (2007)
  - Ranked No. 40 of the Top 50 Greatest WWE Female Superstars of All Time (2021)
