= List of WWE Divas Champions =

Listing of professional wrestling champions for the Divas Championship

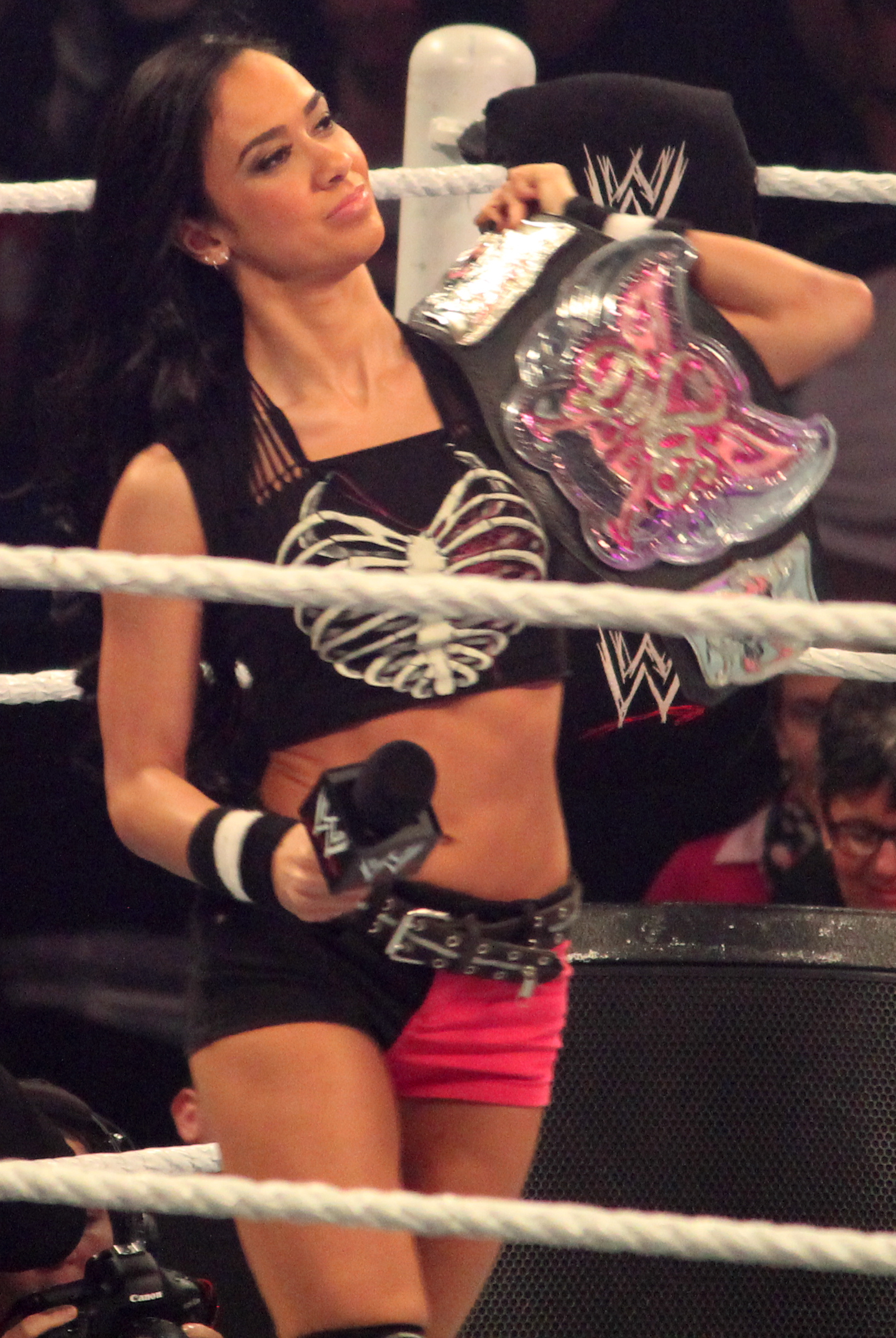
Record-tying three-time and the longest combined reigning Divas Champion AJ Lee

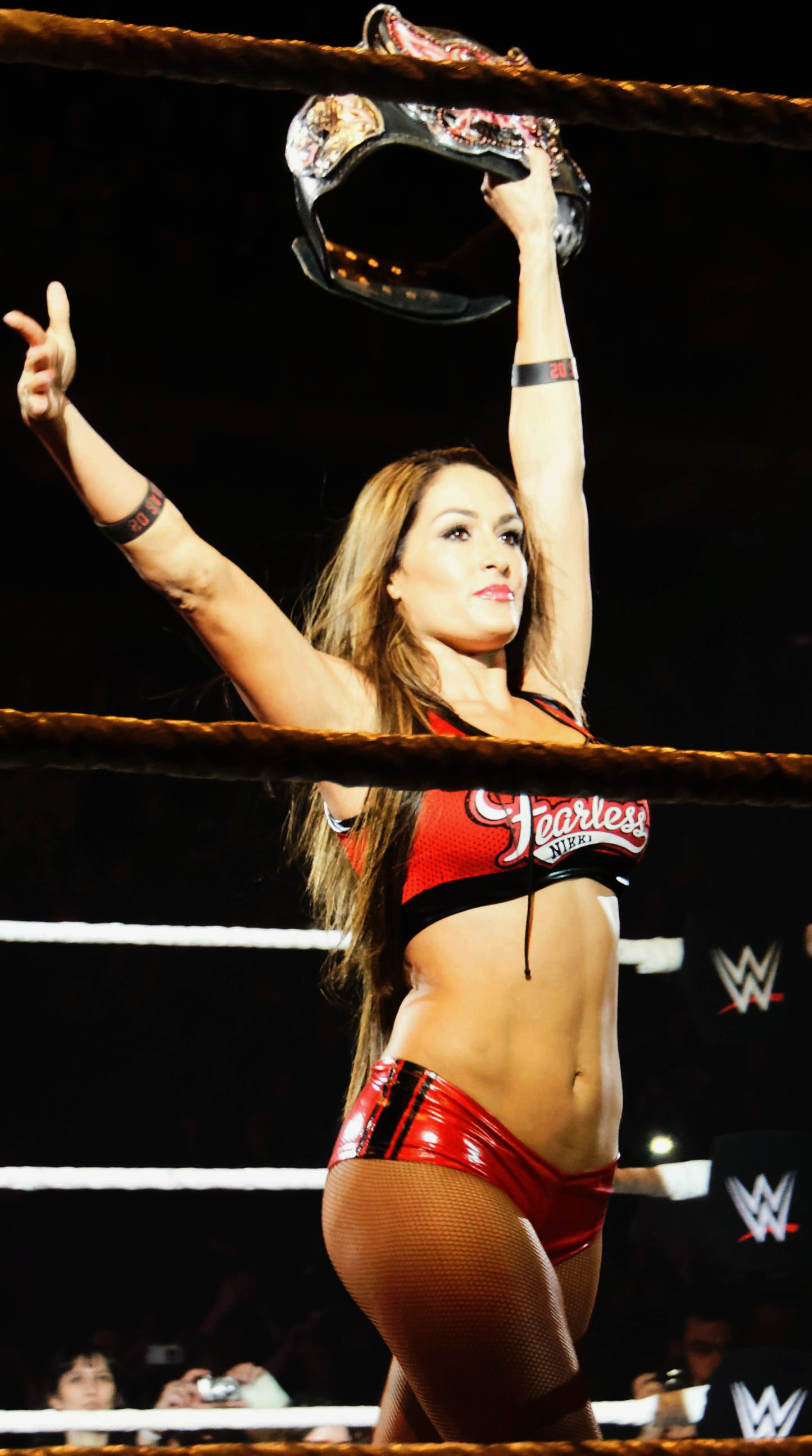
Longest individual reigning Divas Champion Nikki Bella

The WWE Divas Championship was a women's professional wrestling championship in the WWE promotion. The championship was generally contested in professional wrestling matches, in which participants executed scripted finishes rather than contending in direct competition. The word "Divas" in the championship's name refers to the pseudonym WWE Diva, which WWE used to refer to its female wrestlers.

The creation of the championship was announced on June 6, 2008, by then SmackDown General Manager Vickie Guerrero as a counterpart to the Raw brand's WWE Women's Championship. The inaugural champion was Michelle McCool, who defeated Natalya on July 20, 2008, at The Great American Bash. On April 13, 2009, the title was moved from SmackDown to Raw as a result of then Divas Champion Maryse being drafted to Raw in the 2009 WWE draft. On September 19, 2010, at the Night of Champions pay-per-view event, Michelle McCool (defending the Women's Championship on behalf of tag team partner and official champion, Layla) defeated Divas Champion Melina, retiring the Women's Championship and unifying it with the Divas Championship.

The title was retired on April 3, 2016, at WrestleMania 32, after Lita revealed the new WWE Women's Championship would replace the Divas Championship. Reigning champion Charlotte defeated Becky Lynch and Sasha Banks in a triple threat match at the event to become the new Women's Champion and therefore the final Divas Champion.

Overall, there were 17 different champions. Eve Torres and AJ Lee held the record for most reigns as Divas Champion with three. AJ Lee also had the longest combined reign as Divas Champion at 406 days. Nikki Bella had the longest individual title reign at 301 days, while Jillian Hall had the shortest reign at 5 minutes.

== Title history ==
=== Names ===
Name	Years
WWE Divas Championship	June 6, 2008 – April 3, 2016
Unified WWE Divas Championship	September 19, 2010

=== Reigns ===
Key
No.	Overall reign number
Reign	Reign number for the specific champion
Days	Number of days held
Days recog.	Number of days held recognized by the promotion

No.	Champion	Championship change			Reign statistics			Notes	Ref.
No.	Champion	Date	Event	Location	Reign	Days	Days recog.	Notes	Ref.
WWE: SmackDown
1	Michelle McCool	July 20, 2008	The Great American Bash	Uniondale, NY	1	155	158	From September 2002 until July 2008, the SmackDown brand was without a women's championship as the WWE Women's Championship was exclusive to the Raw brand. To remedy this, SmackDown General Manager Vickie Guerrero established the Divas Championship as the counterpart title to the Women's Championship. McCool defeated Natalya to become the inaugural champion. WWE recognizes McCool's reign as ending on December 26, 2008, when the episode aired on tape delay.	
2	Maryse	December 22, 2008	SmackDown	Toronto, ON, Canada	1	216	211	Maria was the special guest referee. The championship became exclusive to the Raw brand following the 2009 WWE draft. WWE recognizes Maryse's reign as beginning on December 26, 2008, when the episode aired on tape delay.	
WWE: Raw
3	Mickie James	July 26, 2009	Night of Champions	Philadelphia, PA	1	78	78		
4	Jillian Hall	October 12, 2009	Raw	Indianapolis, IN	1	<1	<1		
5	Melina	October 12, 2009	Raw	Indianapolis, IN	1	84	83		
—	Vacated	January 4, 2010	Raw	Dayton, OH	—	—	—	The title was vacated after Melina sustained a torn anterior cruciate ligament.	
6	Maryse	February 22, 2010	Raw	Indianapolis, IN	2	49	48	Defeated Gail Kim in a tournament final to win the vacant title.	
7	Eve Torres	April 12, 2010	Raw	London, England	1	69	68		
8	Alicia Fox	June 20, 2010	Fatal 4-Way	Uniondale, NY	1	56	55	This was a fatal four-way match also involving Gail Kim and Maryse. Fox pinned Maryse to win the championship.	
9	Melina	August 15, 2010	SummerSlam	Los Angeles, CA	2	35	34		
WWE: Raw and SmackDown
10	Michelle McCool	September 19, 2010	Night of Champions	Rosemont, IL	2	63	62	This was a lumberjill match where the Women's Championship was unified with the Divas Championship. The title subsequently became defended on both the Raw and SmackDown brands and was briefly referred to as the Unified WWE Divas Championship, keeping the lineage of the Divas Championship while the Women's Championship was retired. Layla was unofficially the co-champion during this reign; she defended the championship in McCool's place on some occasions.	
11	Natalya	November 21, 2010	Survivor Series	Miami, FL	1	70	69	This was a handicap match also involving Layla as Michelle McCool's tag team partner.	
12	Eve Torres	January 30, 2011	Royal Rumble	Boston, MA	2	71	70	This was a fatal four-way match also involving Layla and Michelle McCool. Eve pinned Layla to win the championship.	
13	Brie Bella	April 11, 2011	Raw	Bridgeport, CT	1	70	70		
14	Kelly Kelly	June 20, 2011	Raw: Power to the People	Baltimore, MD	1	104	103	This was a "Power to the People" special episode of Raw, where Brie Bella's opponent was determined by a fan-voted poll. Kelly Kelly received the highest number of votes over Beth Phoenix and Eve Torres. Also during Kelly's reign during year 2011 of August WWE's first brand extension officially ended.	
WWE (unbranded)
15	Beth Phoenix	October 2, 2011	Hell in a Cell	New Orleans, LA	1	204	203		
16	Nikki Bella	April 23, 2012	Raw	Detroit, MI	1	6	5	This was a lumberjill match.	
17	Layla	April 29, 2012	Extreme Rules	Rosemont, IL	1	140	139	Beth Phoenix was originally scheduled to challenge for the title, but was not medically cleared at the time before the match got started. Layla made her return as a surprise challenger for the title. Layla pinned Brie Bella to win the title from Nikki Bella after the twins switched places during the match while the referee was distracted.	
18	Eve Torres	September 16, 2012	Night of Champions	Boston, MA	3	120	120		
19	Kaitlyn	January 14, 2013	Raw 20th Anniversary Special	Houston, TX	1	153	152		
20	AJ Lee	June 16, 2013	Payback	Rosemont, IL	1	295	295		
21	Paige	April 7, 2014	Raw	New Orleans, LA	1	84	84		
22	AJ Lee	June 30, 2014	Raw	Hartford, CT	2	48	47		
23	Paige	August 17, 2014	SummerSlam	Los Angeles, CA	2	35	35		
24	AJ Lee	September 21, 2014	Night of Champions	Nashville, TN	3	63	63	This was a triple threat match also involving Nikki Bella.	
25	Nikki Bella	November 23, 2014	Survivor Series	St. Louis, MO	2	301	300		
26	Charlotte	September 20, 2015	Night of Champions	Houston, TX	1	196	195	If Nikki Bella was counted out or disqualified, she would lose the title per the stipulation.	
—	Deactivated	April 3, 2016	WrestleMania 32	Arlington, TX	—	—	—	Lita announced that the winner of the triple threat match in which Charlotte was to defend the Divas Championship against Becky Lynch and Sasha Banks would instead be for the new WWE Women's Championship, subsequently retiring the Divas Championship.	

== Combined reigns ==
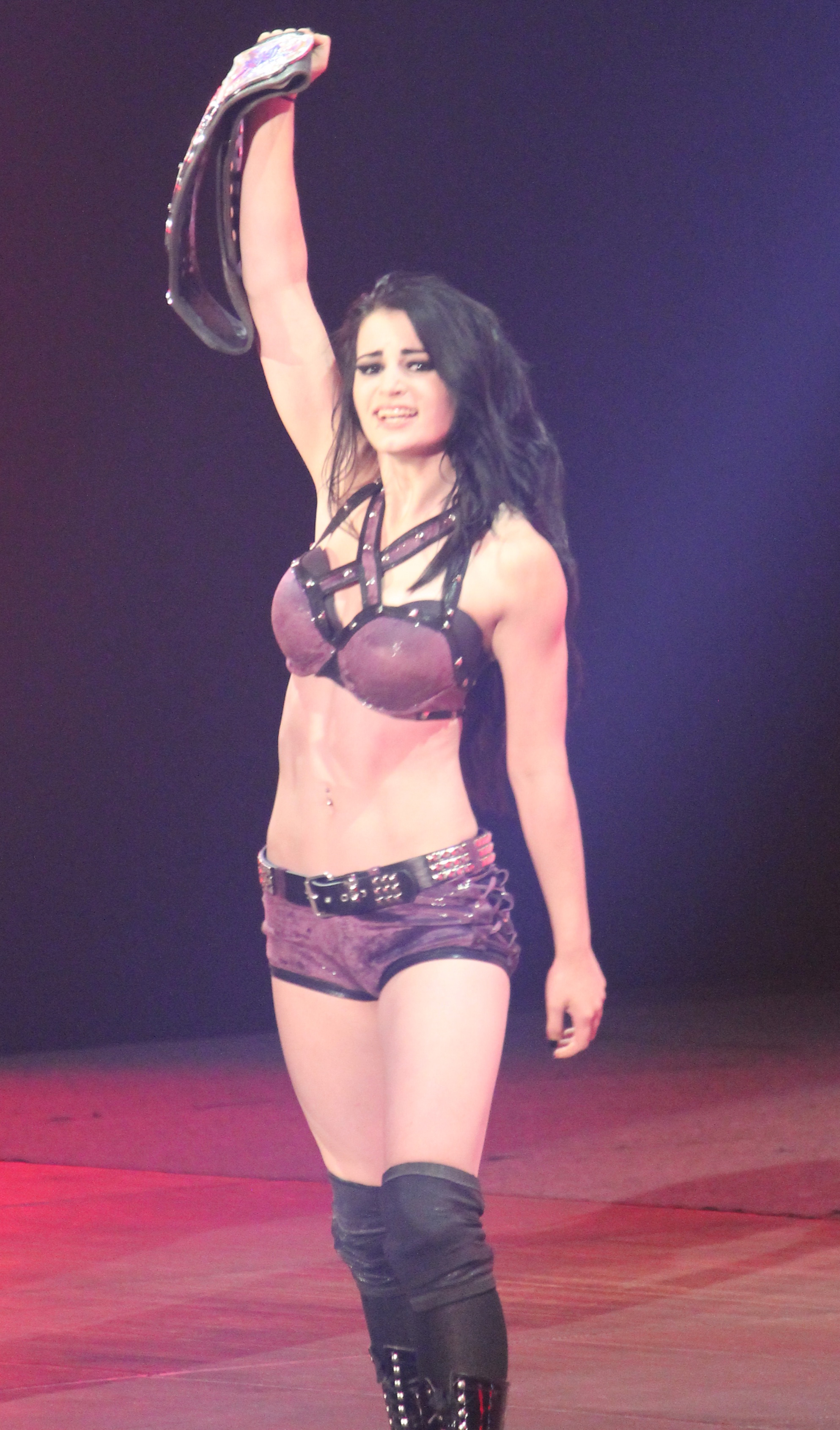
Paige was the youngest Divas Champion. She won the title on her main roster debut at the age of 21. She was also the NXT Women's Champion when she won the WWE Divas Championship, but was forced to vacate the NXT title after winning the Divas.

Rank	Wrestler	No. of reigns	Combined days	Combined days recognized by WWE
1	AJ Lee	3	406	405
2	Nikki Bella	2	307	305
3	Maryse	2	265	259
4	Eve Torres	3	260	258
5	Michelle McCool	2	218	220
6	Beth Phoenix	1	204	203
7	Charlotte	1	196	195
8	Kaitlyn	1	153	152
9	Layla	1	140	139
10	Paige	2	119	
10	Melina	2	119	117
12	Kelly Kelly	1	104	103
13	Mickie James	1	78	
14	Brie Bella	1	70	
14	Natalya	1	70	69
16	Alicia Fox	1	56	55
17	Jillian Hall	1	<1	
