= Show Me the Money (American game show) =

- Created by: Dick de Rijk
- Directed by: R. Brian DiPirro
- Presented by: William Shatner
- Composers: Doug DeAngelis; Kevin Haskins; Doug Beck
- Country of origin: United States
- Original language: English
- No. of seasons: 1
- No. of episodes: 7 (2 unaired)

Production
- Executive producer: Mike Nichols
- Editor: Chip Brown
- Running time: 60 minutes
- Production company: Endemol USA

Original release
- Network: ABC
- Release: November 14 – December 13, 2006

Show Me the Money is a television game show based on the Italian game show Tutto X Tutto (All for All) hosted by William Shatner which ran on ABC from November 14, 2006, to December 13, 2006. The show employed an aspect similar to Deal or No Deal, but with open-ended trivia questions.

The show was taped at CBS Television City in Hollywood. It also aired in Canada on CH.

== Gameplay ==
Before the game, scrolls were randomly distributed to thirteen female dancers known as the Million Dollar Dancers. Twelve of the scrolls contained various dollar amounts, while one held a "killer card" symbolized by a black dancer silhouette within a yellow triangle. The dollar amounts were:

$20,000	$40,000	$60,000	$80,000
$100,000	$120,000	$140,000	$160,000
$180,000	$200,000	$220,000	$250,000

Each turn involved a set of three concealed questions (A, B, and C) with a common initial word or phrase. The player was shown this initial phrase, then chose one of the three options. The question was read, and the player could either answer it or pass and pick another letter. The host would immediately reveal the answer to any passed question and remove it from play; a player could pass twice on the same turn, but was then required to answer the third question. The player gave an answer and selected one dancer to open her scroll, after which the correct answer was revealed. If the scroll showed a dollar amount, it was added to the player's s bank for a correct answer or deducted for a miss. Negative bank totals were possible. The chosen dancer and her scroll were removed from play after each question.

Once the player had given either six correct answers or six incorrect ones on questions with money at stake, the game ended and the player won all the money in the bank. If the pot fell so far below zero that it would be mathematically impossible to achieve a positive total, the game ended immediately and the player left with nothing, but was offered a last dance with the host and the dancers.

The maximum possible winnings total was $1,150,000, achieved by selecting only the six highest dollar amounts and correctly answering a question associated with each.

=== Killer Card ===
If the killer card was revealed, the current question was discarded and a new "sudden-death" question was asked, with no option to pass. An incorrect answer ended the game immediately and eliminated the player with no winnings. If the player did respond correctly, the game continued as normal, but the answer was not counted toward the six needed to end the game and the bank was not affected.

On the premiere episode only, the player was allowed to answer the current question after finding the killer card. The game continued normally on a correct answer, while a miss triggered the sudden-death situation described above.

== Broadcast history ==
The show premiered with a Sneak Preview on November 14, 2006, in the Tuesday 9:30 p.m. timeslot after Dancing with the Stars, before moving to Wednesday 8:00 p.m. timeslot for its season premiere the following week, with one episode airing per week for the next five weeks. On December 8, 2006, after the first seven episodes had been taped, an additional six-episode order as well as a planned move to a Tuesday night timeslot starting on January 2, 2007, were announced, which would have brought the total number of episodes to 13.

=== Cancellation ===
On December 15, 2006, ABC canceled the series after five episodes due to continually declining ratings, leaving two of the seven episodes that were produced unaired. The show was replaced immediately with reruns of America's Funniest Home Videos. ABC had earlier decided to cease production of the series, but air the remaining episodes.

Three of the $1,000,000 dancers have since appeared on other shows:

- Julianne Hough began appearing as a professional dancer on Dancing with the Stars in 2007, she would leave that show in 2009 in order to focus on her country music and acting career.
- Yesenia Adame was the caller on the ABC version of National Bingo Night, which aired in the summer of 2007.
- Eve Torres was the winner of World Wrestling Entertainment's 2007 diva search, and would work with the company for seven years before retiring as a professional wrestler in 2013.

GSN picked up the rights to the seven episodes of Show Me The Money in June 2007, which included the five that aired on ABC, plus the remaining two episodes that the network did not air.

The first episode aired on June 12, 2007, and the second episode aired on June 19, 2007. However, on June 26, 2007, GSN replaced the series with an episode of Who Wants to Be a Millionaire. It is known that GSN pulled the show due to bad ratings for the first two weeks and it was replaced by Dog Eat Dog on the Tuesday nights for the remainder of July 2007. There is no indication that GSN will air the show again, thus the two episodes not broadcast by ABC remain unaired.

GSN's webpage for the show included a photo from one of the two unaired episodes. The photo depicted Bob Glouberman, the contestant whose game was in progress at the end of the last episode aired by ABC, and a winnings total of $890,000 displayed on the scoreboard. Glouberman completed his game with that total in his bank and was paid, even though the episode showing his victory never aired on ABC.

== International versions ==
Country	Local name	Host	Top prize	Network	Year aired
Australia	Show Me the Money	?	?	Nine Network	2007 (planned but never aired)
Greece	Show Me the Mon€y	Christos Ferentinos	?	ANT1	March 13, 2008 – 2008
Italy	Tutto x Tutto	Pupo	€3,700,000	Rai Uno	August 7 – September 21, 2006
Spain	Money, Money	Josep Lobató	€1,080,000	Cuatro	February 5, 2007 – May 2008
United Kingdom	Show Me What You've Got	Dale Winton	£8,160,000	ITV1	August 9, 2006 (pilot not picked up)
Vietnam	Khắc nhập khắc xuất	Minh Tiệp (2008); Hồng Phúc (2009–2010)	108,000,000 VNĐ (first season); 207,000,000 VNĐ (second season)	VTV3	January 12, 2008 – January 30, 2010
