= Jillian Hall =

American professional wrestler and singer

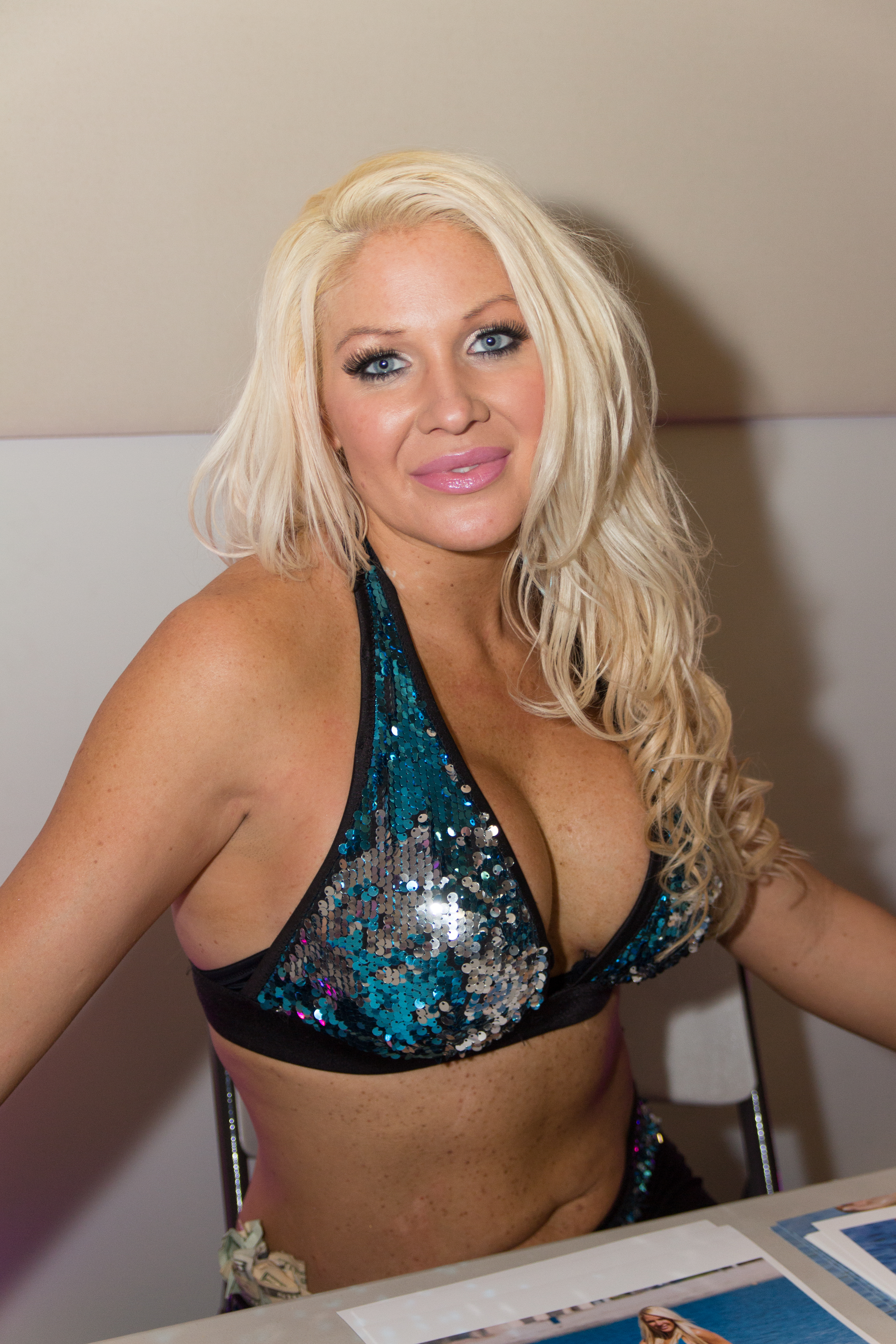
- Hall in 2013

Personal information
- Born: Jillian Faye Fletcher; September 6, 1980 (age 45) Ashland, Kentucky, U.S.
- Spouses: Tim Hall (m. 2000; div. 2004); Mike Farole (m. 2010; div. 2012); Zachary Farrow (m. 2021)
- Children: 2

Professional wrestling career
- Ring names: Jillian Hall; Jillian; Macaela Mercedes
- Billed height: 5 ft 6 in (1.68 m)
- Billed weight: 130 lb (59 kg)
- Billed from: Los Angeles, California; Louisville, Kentucky
- Trained by: Dave Finlay; Steve Keirn; Lance Storm
- Debut: 1998
- Retired: 2021

Jillian Faye Hall (born Jillian Faye Fletcher; September 6, 1980) is an American retired professional wrestler. She is best known for her tenure in WWE.

After debuting in 1998, Hall worked on the independent circuit under the name Macaela Mercedes. She won numerous championships, before beginning to work for Ohio Valley Wrestling in 2003 under her real name. She debuted on WWE's SmackDown brand as the "fixer" for the MNM faction. After leaving MNM, she became John "Bradshaw" Layfield's "image consultant", and managed him to the WWE United States Championship at WrestleMania 22. In February 2007, Hall developed an in-ring persona as a tone-deaf singer. In June 2007, she was drafted to Raw, where she participated in numerous tag team matches after allying with Melina. In October 2009, Hall won the WWE Divas Championship, but lost it to Melina the same night, marking her reign as the shortest in the title's history. Hall was released from her WWE contract in November 2010. Following this, Hall has appeared twice in WWE; first at the Raw Reunion in 2019 and then at the Royal Rumble 2021. Following her 2019 Raw Reunion appearance, WWE officially began regarding Hall as a legend. From 2010 to 2013, Hall wrestled on the independent circuit.

== Professional wrestling career ==
=== Training and early career (1998–2003) ===
Hall was originally trained by Roger Ruffen in Cincinnati. Later she trained with Dave Finlay at his professional wrestling school. Debuting in 1998, Fletcher wrestled under the ring name Macaela Mercedes on the independent circuit as a villainous character. Mercedes won numerous championships on the independent circuit, including Southern States Wrestling's Women's Championship. She wrestled for women-only promotions, including G.L.O.R.Y., the Professional Girl Wrestling Association (PGWA), and the Women's Wrestling Alliance (WWA), and held both the WWA Women's Championship and the PGWA Championship. She also competed for other promotions including Hoosier Pro Wrestling (HPW), where she won both the HPW Cruiserweight Championship and HPW Ladies' Championship, Canadian International Wrestling (CIW), where she won the CIW Indy Women's Championship, Mid–States Championship Wrestling, where she won the MCW Mid-American title, and Blue Water Championship Wrestling, where she won the BWCW Women's title. Her greatest independent circuit success was in the Superstar Wrestling Federation (SWF), where she held the SWF Women's Championship and also competed in numerous intergender matches. She held the SWF Tag Team Championship twice, once with Tiny Tim and once with Randy Allen. In 2002 and early 2003, Mercedes wrestled regularly for the Apocalypse Wrestling Federation and Wrestle And Respect, where she competed in intergender matches and was involved in a scripted rivalry with the "Fabulous Firebird" Phoenix over the G.L.O.R.Y. Ladies' Wrestling Championship. On January 23, 2003, Mercedes won the G.L.O.R.Y. Ladies' Wrestling Championship, when she defeated the "Fabulous Firebird" Phoenix via referee's decision at an Apocalypse Wrestling Federation show.

=== World Wrestling Entertainment/WWE (2003–2010, 2019–2021) ===
==== Ohio Valley Wrestling (2003–2005) ====
In mid-2003, Fletcher began working for Ohio Valley Wrestling (OVW). She eventually signed a developmental contract with World Wrestling Entertainment (WWE) in 2004. She started out in OVW as a fan favorite—gaining the nickname "Chronically Cute"—and had a series of matches against Alexis Laree. After wrestling sporadically throughout 2004, Hall returned in January 2005 as a villain, complete with breast implants, and straightened, bleached blonde hair. The villainous turn was motivated in an angle where her implants "leaked into her brain", causing her to become psychotic. As a villain, she managed the OVW Southern Tag Team Champions Blonde Bombers (Tank and Chad Toland) alongside her bodyguard Melissa Coates and went on a spree of blinding people with rubbing alcohol in storyline.

==== Managerial roles (2005–2006) ====
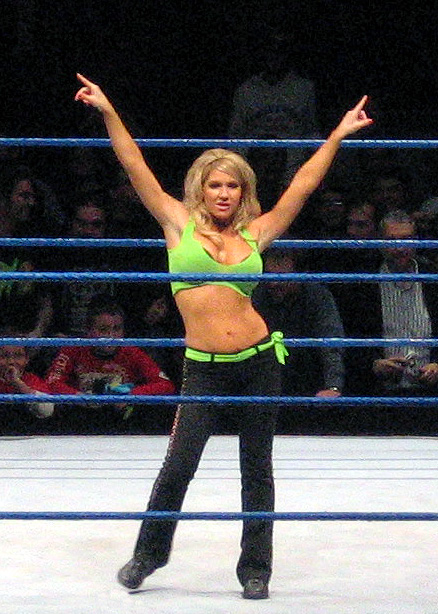
Hall making her entrance before a scheduled wrestling match, during a WWE SmackDown! house show

Hall made her WWE debut on the July 28, 2005, episode of SmackDown! with a gimmick of a "fixer" for the villainous faction MNM (Joey Mercury, Johnny Nitro, and Melina). She also had a "growth" on the left side of her face, which she referred to as a "blemish", the nature of which the announcers constantly speculated over. The gimmick carried over to OVW, where the Blonde Bombers forced her to choose between them and MNM. She eventually chose MNM, but did not stay with that group for very long. As MNM's fixer, she helped them to obtain a photo shoot for the cover of SmackDown! magazine, and helped to fix a problem that Melina had with Torrie Wilson, by helping Melina defeat her.

Hall was later approached by John "Bradshaw" Layfield (JBL), a former WWE Champion who asked for help repairing his image after a loss to underdog Rey Mysterio. During this time, she was involved in her first feud on SmackDown!, against Stacy Keibler, with the two confronting each other many times until Hall cheated to defeat Keibler in Keibler's final match on Velocity, one of WWE's secondary television programs. As JBL's "Image Consultant", she had an important role in JBL's feud with The Boogeyman, which included The Boogeyman putting worms down her skirt and biting off her mole. She also successfully guided JBL to winning the United States Championship from Chris Benoit at WrestleMania 22 in April.

That April, he fired her after Hall accidentally slammed a cage door on JBL's head during a steel cage match and put together a "second-rate" United States championship celebration. After being fired, she turned into a fan favorite and began a rivalry with former client, Melina of MNM. She defeated her in a six-man tag team match along with Paul London and Brian Kendrick and in singles competition at Judgment Day in a controversial fashion.

==== Singing (2006–2008) ====
Throughout mid-2006, she teamed with Ashley Massaro in a feud against Michelle McCool and Kristal. In July, she participated in a Bra and Panties match at The Great American Bash which was won by Massaro. She appeared only sporadically throughout the end of 2006, competing mainly in dance and lingerie contests.

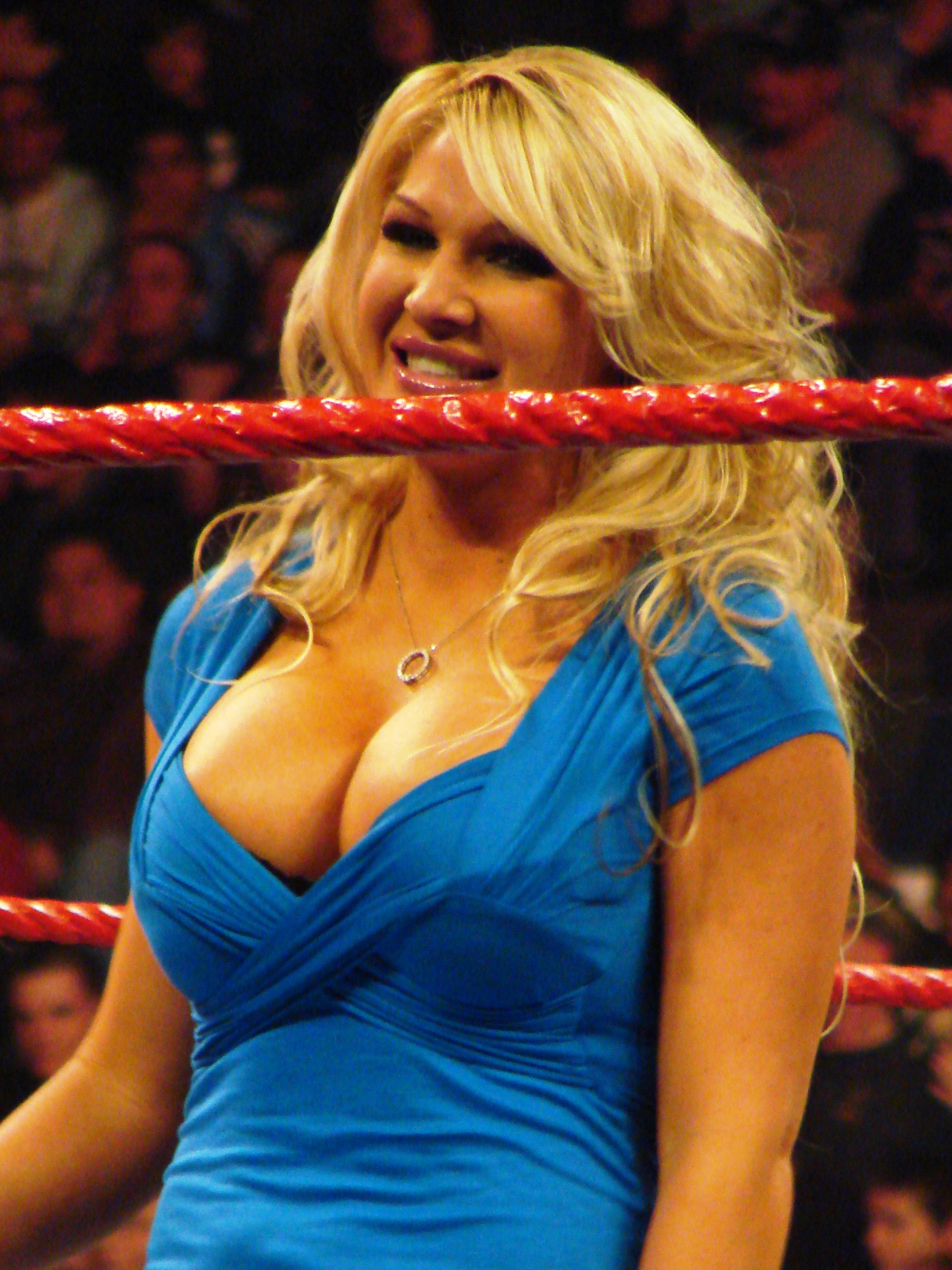
Jillian during a WWE Raw event in March 2008

In January 2007, Hall began a rivalry with Massaro centered on Hall's jealousy of Massaro's recent Playboy appearance; the rivalry turned Hall into a villain and matches between the two mainly resulted in losses for Hall. During the feud, Hall attempted to prove that she was talented in areas beyond wrestling and being eye candy by creating a new in-ring persona, in which she sang badly at every opportunity, but thought she was a very good singer. She later attempted to impress music producer Timbaland by performing a song she claimed to have composed herself, looking for a spot in a video he was preparing and a possible future collaboration on a music project, but he turned her down. Massaro, with whom she had been involved in a rivalry, was one of the wrestlers who was chosen to work with Timbaland instead. Jealous of Massaro's recent successes, she attacked her and, in storyline, seriously injured her, with the reasoning that if she could not appear in Timbaland's music project, neither could Massaro. Following this incident, she had a short rivalry with Michelle McCool, who had come to Massaro's aid, and was annoyed by Hall's singing. She defeated McCool in a singles match on the April 27 episode of SmackDown!, and sang before and after their match. They continued to compete against each other throughout May and June, with McCool coming out on top.

Hall was drafted from SmackDown! to the Raw brand on June 17, 2007, as part of the 2007 Supplemental Draft. The following night, Hall won her Raw debut where she teamed with Melina to defeat Mickie James and Candice Michelle in a tag team match. From then on, Hall mainly competed in tag team matches, wrestling James, Michelle, and Maria. She resumed her singing gimmick not long after, frequently appearing in backstage and in-ring segments, including a stint as one of the contestants for the WWE Idol segment on the August 13 episode. She also entered into an on-and-off angle with ring announcer Lilian Garcia stemming from her jealousy of Garcia's flourishing singing career. In October, Hall formed an alliance with Melina, and the pair teamed together on numerous occasions throughout the end of the year. She also competed in the 10-wrestler tag team match at Survivor Series, but her team was not successful.

==== Divas Champion and departure (2008–2010) ====
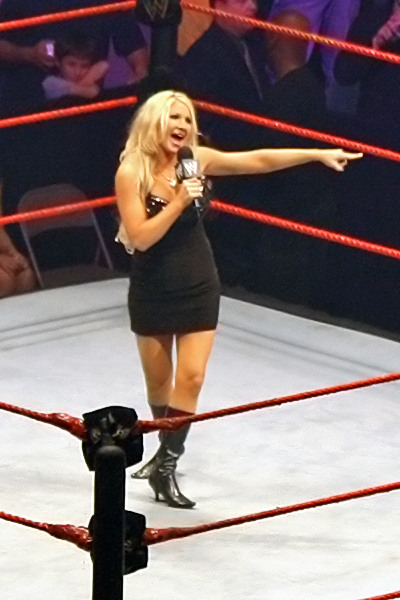
Hall singing during a live event

At the start of 2008, Hall continued her alliance with Melina, both teaming with her and accompanying her to the ring on numerous occasions. Hall was utilized mainly in a backup role throughout the next few months, teaming with Melina, as well as competing in a 12 wrestler tag team match at the Backlash pay-per-view in April, which her team won. In mid-2008, Hall began a scripted rivalry with Mickie James and Kelly Kelly, teaming up with multiple partners, including Layla and Katie Lea Burchill to face them in tag team matches. She continued to have a rivalry with Kelly throughout October, and was also a part of the winning team in a Raw versus SmackDown 10-wrestler tag team elimination match at Survivor Series in November, although she was eliminated by Maria. On the December 29 episode of Raw, Hall competed in a number one contender Divas battle royal for the opportunity to face Beth Phoenix at the Royal Rumble for the Women's Championship, but was eliminated by Mickie James.

In January 2009, she formed an alliance with the Women's Champion, Beth Phoenix to face Kelly Kelly and former ally Melina in tag team matches, which Phoenix and Hall won due to the interference of Rosa Mendes, Phoenix's associate. She also sporadically competed in singles matches, losing to both Kelly Kelly and Melina. On April 5, at WrestleMania XXV, Hall competed in the 25-Diva battle royal, which was won by "Santina" Marella, and continued to compete in tag team matches throughout April and May. Hall then took a brief hiatus and made her return on August 3, teaming with Beth Phoenix to defeat Mickie James and Gail Kim.

On the October 12 episode of Raw, Hall defeated Mickie James to win the Divas Championship, her first championship in WWE, but lost it to Melina immediately afterwards. This prompted a series of matches between the two. On October 19, Hall unsuccessfully challenged Melina for the title in a rematch. She also teamed with Chavo Guerrero in a losing effort to Melina and Santino Marella in a mixed tag team match, and at Survivor Series, Hall's team was on the losing end of tag team elimination match to Melina's team.

Hall competed only sporadically throughout 2010, mainly in tag team matches. On October 2, Hall announced that she was taking a break from television as she had been assigned as a trainer for WWE's developmental territory Florida Championship Wrestling. On November 19, 2010, Hall was released from her WWE contract.

==== Sporadic appearances (2019–2021) ====
On July 22, 2019, Hall appeared during a backstage segment at the Raw Reunion show and she also made an in-ring appearance later on in the show. After ten years of not wrestling in WWE, Hall returned to participate in the 2021 Royal Rumble. During the match, Hall formed an alliance with Billie Kay which was short lived as Hall was eliminated by Kay. In April 2021, WWE Network listed Hall as one of the female performers who made an impact in WWE outside the ring. Hall was also on-hand as a backup for the 2022 Royal Rumble but eventually did not compete.

=== Return to the independent circuit (2010–2013) ===
After her release from WWE, Hall returned to the independent circuit in 2010, competing for promotions including Xtreme Pro Wrestling, World Wrestling Fan Xperience, and Crossfire Wrestling. On June 25, 2011, at The Uncensored Rumble IV event, Jillian made her Women Superstars Uncensored debut against Kristin Astara in a losing effort. Hall made her debut for Pro Wrestling Xtreme (PWX) on January 28, 2012, at the PWX A Wrestling Odyssey event, where she defeated Leva Bates to win the vacant PWX Women's Championship. At the PWX 1 year Anniversary show on April 28, Hall lost the championship to Shooter Storm. Jillian made her debut for Family Wrestling Entertainment (FWE) at the FWE Empire State Showdown pay-per-view, as a face defeating Jackie Gayda. At the FWE Dysfunctional Family pay-per-view, Hall defeated Maria Kanellis, with Winter as the special guest referee. Later that night, she teamed with Winter in a losing effort to Kanellis and Rosita.

On September 27, 2012, Hall wrestled Tara in a dark match for Total Nonstop Action Wrestling (TNA), where she won. On March 17, 2013, Hall returned to TNA to take part in the tapings of the TNA Knockout Knockdown One Night Only pay-per-view, where she was defeated by Velvet Sky.

== A Jingle with Jillian ==
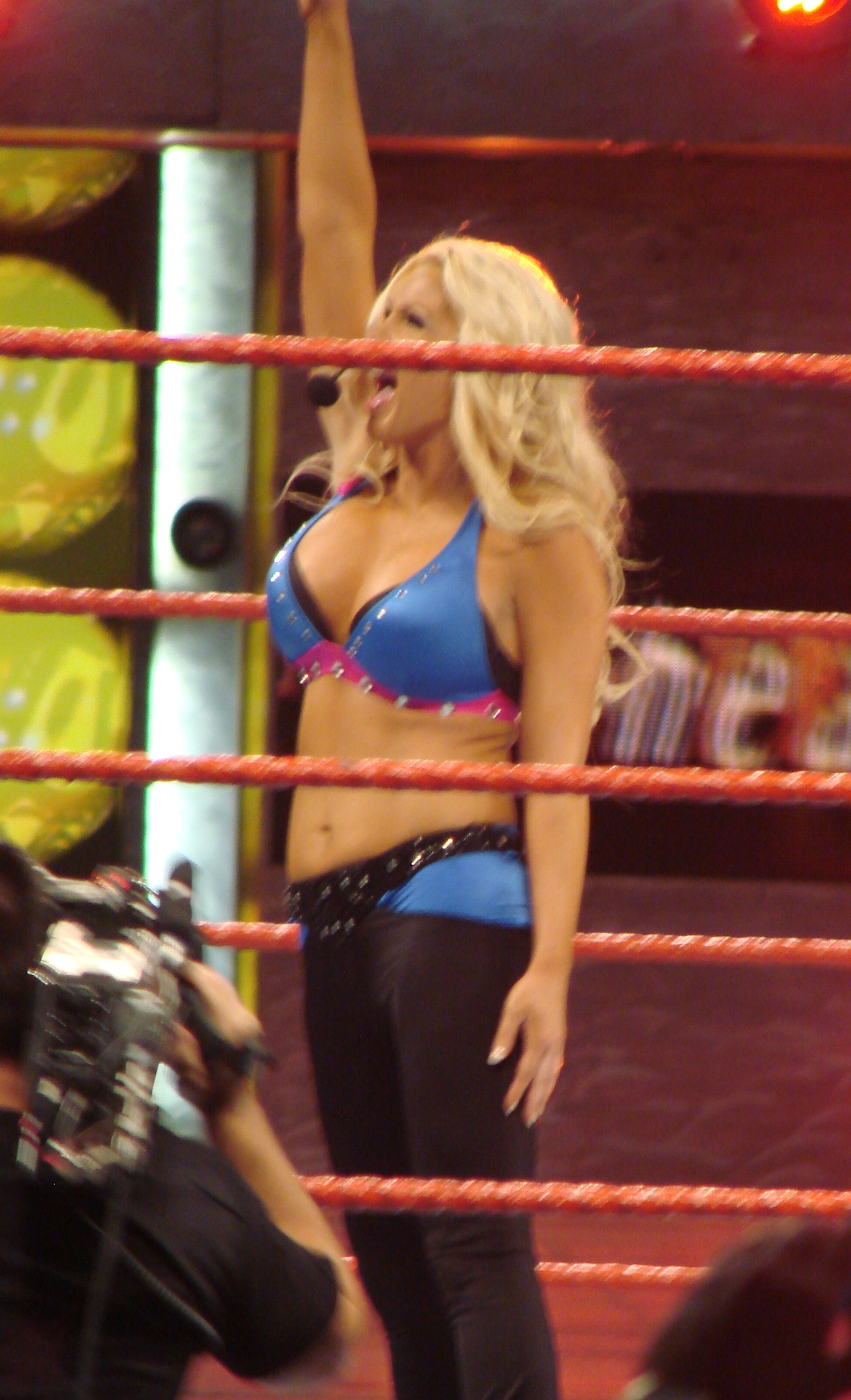
Jillian Hall during her singer gimmick

Hall released her first album A Jingle with Jillian on December 11, 2007, on iTunes nationwide. The album features five traditional Christmas songs covered by Hall in her character of a terrible singer. The album itself reached number 20 in the UK Holidays Top 100 shortly after its release.

== Other media ==
Hall is playable in two WWE video games. She made her in-game debut in WWE SmackDown vs. Raw 2007 and also appears in WWE SmackDown vs. Raw 2009.

== Personal life ==
As a teenager, Hall was a cheerleader and also took gymnastics classes. After graduating from high school, Hall attended college, but dropped out in order to train as a professional wrestler. At nineteen, she legally changed her last name from Fletcher to Hall when she married Tim Hall (an independent wrestler named Tiny Tim). She was a fan of Rick Martel.

Hall is divorced and has a child from the marriage. On September 10, 2010, Hall married Mike Farole in a Las Vegas wedding. Hall announced in February 2011 that the couple was expecting their first child together, but suffered a miscarriage 14 weeks into the pregnancy.

On April 23, 2012, Hall was arrested in Orange County, Florida and charged with battery. Following her arrest, it was reported that Hall had separated from her husband.

In 2020, Hall gave birth to her second child. In December 2021, she married Zachary Farrow and they have separated as of 2024.

== Championships and accomplishments ==
- Blue Water Championship Wrestling
  - BWCW Women's Championship (1 time)
- Canadian International Wrestling
  - CIW Indy Women's Championship (1 time)
- GLORY Wrestling
  - GLORY Championship (1 time)
- Hoosier Pro Wrestling
  - HPW Cruiserweight Championship (1 time)
  - HPW Ladies' Championship (1 time)
- Mid-States Championship Wrestling
  - MCW Mid-American Championship (1 time)
- Professional Girl Wrestling Association
  - PGWA Championship (1 time)
- Pro Wrestling Illustrated
  - Ranked No. 24 of the top 50 female wrestlers in the PWI Female 50 in 2010
- Pro Wrestling Xtreme
  - PWX Women's Championship (1 time)
- Southern States Wrestling
  - SSW Women's Championship (1 time)
- Superstar Wrestling Federation
  - SWF Tag Team Championship (2 times) – with Randy "The King" Allen (1) and Pyro (1)
  - SWF Women's Championship (1 time)
- Women's Wrestling Alliance
  - WWA Women's Championship (1 time)
- World Wrestling Entertainment
  - WWE Divas Championship (1 time)
- Wrestling Observer Newsletter
  - Worst Gimmick (2005)
