= Biography: WWE Legends =

2021 American television series

- Promotional poster for Season 3
- Genre: Documentary
- Country of origin: United States
- Original language: English
- No. of seasons: 5
- No. of episodes: 49 (list of episodes)

Production
- Running time: 42–86 minutes

Original release
- Network: A&E
- Release: April 18, 2021 – present

Related
- Biography

Biography: WWE Legends is a 2021 American documentary television series. A spin-off of A&E's Biography franchise, the series premiered on April 18, 2021.

On March 1, 2022, it was announced that A&E had ordered 35 more episodes of the series.

== Plot ==
The series consists of two-hour documentaries on different WWE superstars, giving an insight into both their personal and on-screen lives. In seasons 3 and 4, several episodes ran with a shorter one-hour runtime.

== Series overview ==
Season	Episodes	Originally released	
Season	Episodes	First released	Last released
1	8	April 18, 2021	June 6, 2021
2	9	July 10, 2022	September 4, 2022
3	10	February 19, 2023	April 16, 2023
4	18	February 25, 2024	August 4, 2024
5	4	April 26, 2026	present

== Episode list ==
=== Season 1 (2021) ===
No. overall	No. in season	Title	Original release date	Viewers (millions)	Rating (18–49)
1	1	"Stone Cold Steve Austin"	April 18, 2021	1.06	0.4
2	2	"Roddy Piper"	April 25, 2021	880,000	0.3
3	3	"Randy Savage"	May 2, 2021	790,000	0.3
4	4	"Booker T"	May 9, 2021	600,000	0.2
5	5	"Shawn Michaels"	May 16, 2021	630,000	0.2
6	6	"The Ultimate Warrior"	May 23, 2021	770,000	0.3
7	7	"Mick Foley"	May 30, 2021	520,000	0.2
8	8	"Bret Hart"	June 6, 2021	640,000	0.3

=== Season 2 (2022) ===
No. overall	No. in season	Title	Original release date	Viewers (millions)	Rating (18–49)
9	1	"The Undertaker"	July 10, 2022	582,000	0.14
10	2	"Goldberg"	July 17, 2022	594,000	0.16
11	3	"The Bella Twins"	July 24, 2022	420,000	0.12
12	4	"Kurt Angle"	July 31, 2022	406,000	0.11
13	5	"Lex Luger"	August 7, 2022	586,000	0.17
14	6	"DX"	August 14, 2022	594,000	0.15
15	7	"Edge"	August 21, 2022	453,000	0.11
16	8	"Rey Mysterio"	August 28, 2022	444,000	0.12
17	9	"WrestleMania I"	September 4, 2022	385,000	0.07

=== Season 3 (2023) ===
No. overall	No. in season	Title	Original release date	Viewers (millions)	Rating (18–49)
18	1	"NWO"	February 19, 2023	495,000	0.15
19	2	"Jake Roberts"	February 26, 2023	453,000	0.12
20	3	"Chyna"	March 5, 2023	481,000	0.14
21	4	"Kane"	March 12, 2023	383,000	0.13
22	5	"Jerry Lawler"	March 19, 2023	350,000	0.11
23	6	"Paige"	March 19, 2023	297,000	0.10
24	7	"Charlotte Flair"	March 26, 2023	338,000	0.11
25	8	"Yokozuna"	March 26, 2023	366,000	0.13
26	9	"Dusty Rhodes"	April 9, 2023	461,000	0.14
27	10	"The Iron Sheik"	April 16, 2023	452,000	0.14

=== Season 4 (2024) ===
No. overall	No. in season	Title	Original release date	Viewers (millions)	Rating (18–49)
28	1	"Randy Orton"	February 25, 2024	377,000	0.11
29	2	"Sgt. Slaughter"	March 3, 2024	276,000	0.07
30	3	"Scott Hall"	March 10, 2024	407,000	0.13
31	4	"Diamond Dallas Page"	March 17, 2024	368,000	0.09
32	5	"British Bulldog"	March 24, 2024	357,000	0.11
33	6	"Roman Reigns"	March 31, 2024	337,000	0.11
34	7	"Stone Cold Steve Austin's Last Match"	May 19, 2024	226,000	0.07
35	8	"Eddie Guerrero"	May 26, 2024	218,000	0.05
36	9	"Ricky Steamboat"	June 2, 2024	288,000	0.08
37	10	"ECW - Birth of Hardcore"	June 16, 2024	N/A	TBA
38	11	"Rob Van Dam"	June 23, 2024	N/A	TBA
39	12	"The Steiner Brothers"	June 30, 2024	N/A	TBA
40	13	"The Miz"	July 14, 2024	N/A	TBA
41	14	"Mark Henry"	July 21, 2024	N/A	TBA
42	15	"Ted DiBiase"	July 28, 2024	N/A	TBA
43	16	"Paul Heyman"	July 28, 2024	N/A	TBA
44	17	"Trish Stratus"	August 4, 2024	N/A	TBA
45	18	"Becky Lynch"	August 4, 2024	N/A	TBA

=== Season 5 (2026) ===
No. overall	No. in season	Title	Original release date	Viewers (millions)	Rating (18–49)
46	1	"The Curse of the Von Erichs, Part 1"	April 26, 2026	N/A	TBA
47	2	"The Curse of the Von Erichs, Part 2"	May 3, 2026	N/A	TBA
48	3	"The Four Horsemen"	May 10, 2026	N/A	TBA
49	4	"Legion of Doom"	May 17, 2026	N/A	TBA
