= WrestleMania =

WWE premium live event series

- The standard WrestleMania logo used since WrestleMania X-Seven in 2001; since WrestleMania 29 in 2013, each year's event uses a modified variation that references the host city.
- Created by: Vince McMahon
- Promotion: WWE
- Brands: Raw (2003–2011, 2017–present); SmackDown (2003–2011, 2017–present); ECW (2007–2009); 205 Live (2018–2019); NXT (2020)
- Nicknames: "The Grandest Stage of Them All" "The Showcase of the Immortals" "The Show of Shows" "The Greatest Spectacle in Sports Entertainment"
- First event: WrestleMania I (1985)

WrestleMania is a professional wrestling premium live event (PLE) held annually between mid-March and mid-April by the American company WWE, the world's largest professional wrestling promotion. Since premiering in 1985, 42 events have been held, with its most recent 42nd edition occurring at Allegiant Stadium in Paradise, Nevada, on April 18 and 19, 2026. WrestleMania was WWE's first pay-per-view (PPV) produced and is the most successful annual professional wrestling event in history. The event has been broadcast through traditional PPV since 1985 and has been available via livestreaming since WrestleMania XXX in 2014, which was WWE's first major event available through this medium. WrestleMania was conceptualized by former WWE executive chairman Vince McMahon and named by ring announcer and WWE Hall of Famer Howard Finkel. It is the company's flagship event and along with Royal Rumble, SummerSlam, Survivor Series, and Money in the Bank, it is referred to as one of the "Big Five", WWE's five biggest annual events of the year.

The widespread success of WrestleMania helped transform professional wrestling. The annual event has facilitated the rise to stardom of several top WWE wrestlers. Celebrities such as Aretha Franklin, Cyndi Lauper, Muhammad Ali, Mr. T, Mike Tyson, Donald Trump, Floyd Mayweather Jr., Snoop Dogg, Rob Gronkowski, Shaquille O'Neal, Ronda Rousey, and Bad Bunny, among many others, have made special appearances within the events, with some participating in matches. Rousey herself would become a wrestler for WWE from 2018 to 2023 and was one of the three women to participate in the first women's WrestleMania main event match, which occurred at WrestleMania 35 in 2019.

The first WrestleMania was held in Madison Square Garden in the New York City borough of Manhattan, New York; the 10th and 20th editions were also held there. WrestleMania III in the Detroit suburb of Pontiac, Michigan, was the highest-attended indoor sports event in the world, with 93,173 fans in attendance. This record stood until February 14, 2010, when the 2010 NBA All-Star Game broke the indoor sporting event record with an attendance of 108,713 at Cowboys Stadium, since renamed AT&T Stadium, in Arlington, Texas. In 2016, WrestleMania 32 surpassed WrestleMania III as the highest-attended professional wrestling event ever held in America, with 101,763 fans in attendance at AT&T Stadium, although the company revealed that attendance figures were manipulated for marketing purposes through investor calls. All editions of the event thus far have been hosted in North American cities, with 39 in the United States and two in Canada. WrestleMania 43 in 2027 will be held in Riyadh, Saudi Arabia, which will be the first WrestleMania to emanate from outside of North America.

The only WrestleMania in the event's history to not air live and be held without fans in attendance was WrestleMania 36 in 2020 due to the COVID-19 pandemic; it was the first major professional wrestling event to be affected by the pandemic. It was also the first WrestleMania to be held across two nights, which subsequently became the standard format for the annual event. WrestleMania 37 in 2021 was WWE's first event back with a live crowd, but at a reduced venue capacity before the company resumed live touring with full capacity crowds in July that year.

== Organization ==
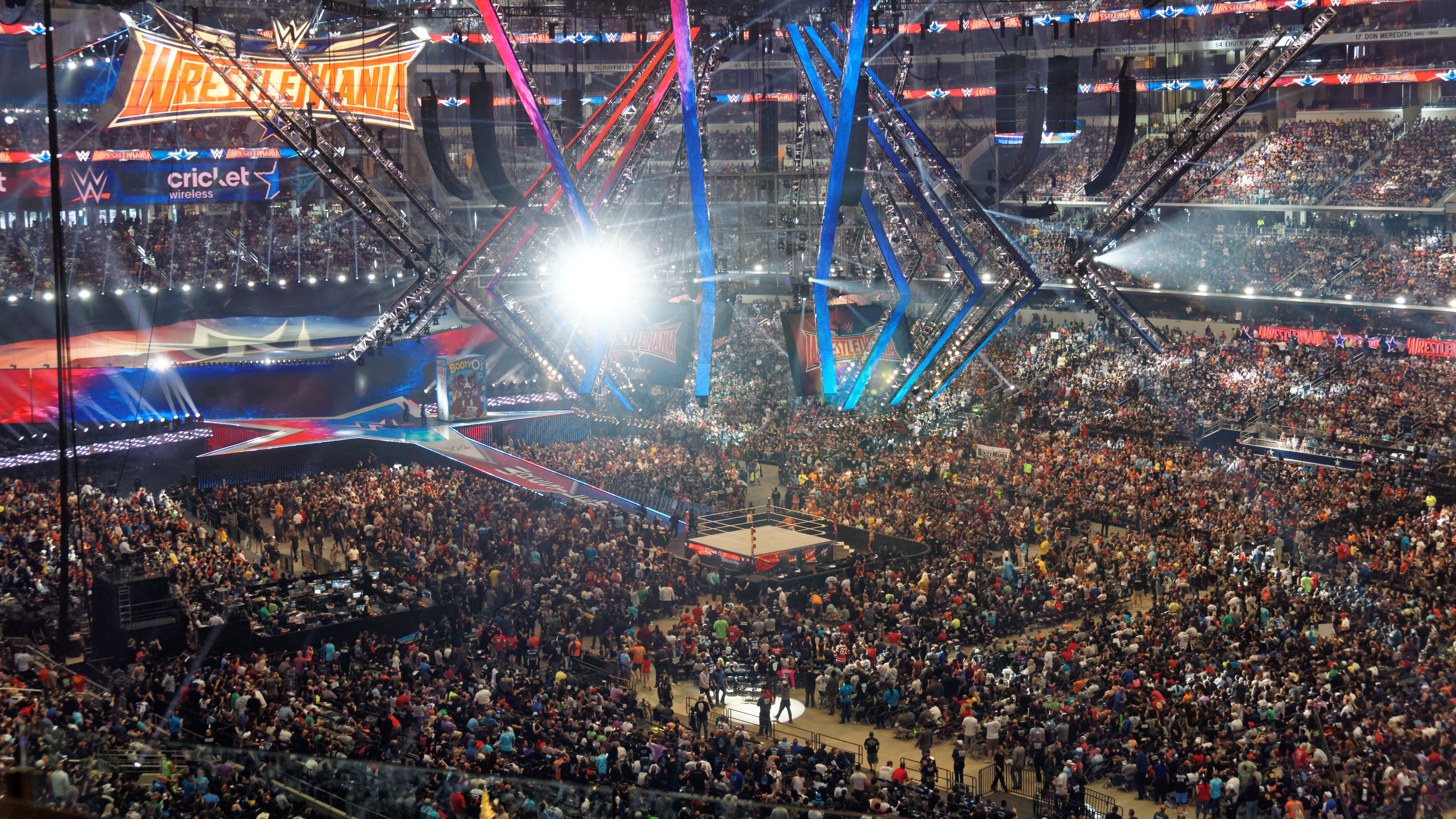
AT&T Stadium during WrestleMania 32

Most WrestleMania events have taken place in large stadiums in large cities, with some in sports arenas. Much like the Super Bowl, cities bid for the right to host the year's edition of WrestleMania. The most-attended events include WrestleMania III (93,173) in Pontiac, WrestleMania VI (67,678) in Toronto, WrestleMania VIII (62,167) in Indianapolis, WrestleMania X-Seven (67,925) in Houston, WrestleMania X8 (68,237) also in Toronto, WrestleMania XIX (54,097) in Seattle, WrestleMania 23 (80,103) in Detroit, WrestleMania XXIV (74,635) in Orlando, WrestleMania 25 (72,744) also in Houston, WrestleMania XXVI (72,219) in Phoenix, WrestleMania XXVII (71,617) in Atlanta, WrestleMania XXVIII (78,363) in Miami, WrestleMania 29 (80,676) in East Rutherford, WrestleMania XXX (75,167) in New Orleans, WrestleMania 31 (76,976) in Santa Clara, and WrestleMania 32 (101,763) in Arlington. Since moving to large stadiums and running WrestleMania Axxess, the event produces a local economy boost for the host cities.

WrestleMania centers on the main event matches, primarily for the men's WWE Championship—and additional men's world titles, such as the previous World Heavyweight Championship (2003–2013), the WWE Universal Championship (2017–2024), and the current World Heavyweight Championship (since 2024)—as well as matches involving celebrities such as American footballer Lawrence Taylor or actor Mr. T. Other WWE championships are also contested for, while the match card also includes gimmick matches and matches involving personal feuds.

Since 1993, the winner of the annual Royal Rumble match receives a guaranteed world championship match at the same year's WrestleMania (except in 2016 in which the WWE World Heavyweight Championship was the prize of the match itself). With the introduction of the previous World Heavyweight Championship in 2002, the winner was also given the option to choose between it or the WWE Championship. The creation of the ECW brand in June 2006 gave the Rumble winner a third option, the ECW Championship. This option was made available from 2007 until the brand was retired in 2010; however, the title was never chosen. The brand split ended in 2011 and the WWE and World Heavyweight Championships were unified in 2013, leaving the former as the only title to challenge for until the reintroduction of the brand split in 2016, which added the WWE Universal Championship as a choice. After it and the WWE Championship were unified as the Undisputed WWE Universal Championship at WrestleMania 38 in 2022, the undisputed title became the only choice in 2023, but with the introduction of a new World Heavyweight Championship following that year's WrestleMania 39, there is once again two choices: the Undisputed WWE Universal Championship and the World Heavyweight Championship. A women's Royal Rumble match was introduced in 2018, with the winner receiving the option of challenging for either the WWE Raw Women's Championship or WWE SmackDown Women's Championship, which were renamed as the WWE Women's Championship and Women's World Championship, respectively, in June 2023. NXT's championships, the NXT Championship and NXT Women's Championship, became additional choices in 2020, but were dropped as choices in 2022 after NXT reverted to its original status as WWE's developmental brand in September 2021.

WrestleMania 21 saw the introduction of the Money in the Bank ladder match. This match features six to ten participants and took place at six WrestleManias between 2005 and 2010 before becoming the headline match of its own pay-per-view event, Money in the Bank which incorporated the use of two Money in the Bank ladder matches for both respective WWE brands, Raw and SmackDown (since 2017, two matches have been held at the titular event, but one each for the men and women, with participants divided between the brands). The participant who retrieves the briefcase suspended above the ring wins a contract, which guarantees a world title match at the time and place of the winner's choosing for up to one year, including the following year's WrestleMania. This lasted until 2010 when the Money in the Bank pay-per-view was introduced and thus the Money in the Bank ladder match was retired from WrestleMania.

Forbes named WrestleMania one of the world's most valuable sports event brands from 2014 to 2019, ranking it sixth with a brand value of US$245 million in 2019 behind the Super Bowl, Summer Olympics, NCAA Final Four, the FIFA World Cup, and the College Football Playoffs.

=== Commentators ===
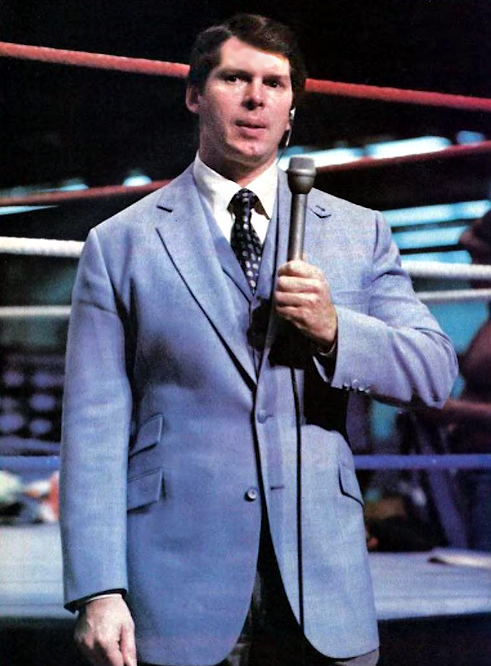
Promoter Vince McMahon is credited with creating WrestleMania and served as a commentator for several events.

For five of the first six WrestleManias, Gorilla Monsoon and Jesse Ventura served as the color commentators (the exception being WrestleMania 2, which was split among three venues and had Monsoon, Ventura, and Vince McMahon split up with guest commentators), while Bobby Heenan, Gene Okerlund, Lord Alfred Hayes, and others filled guest roles. For WrestleMania VII and VIII, Monsoon and Heenan provided color commentary. In the mid to late 1990s, the commentator team comprised Vince McMahon, Jim Ross, and Jerry Lawler. Since the brand separation in 2002, matches from the Raw brand have been called by Ross and Lawler; the SmackDown matches called by Michael Cole, Tazz, John "Bradshaw" Layfield, and Jonathan Coachman, and from 2006 to 2010, the ECW matches called by Joey Styles and Tazz. At WrestleMania 25, the first three-man inter-brand commentary team since the brand extension was introduced was used and consisted of Jim Ross, Jerry "The King" Lawler, and Michael Cole. The following year at WrestleMania XXVI, Jim Ross was replaced by Matt Striker. At WrestleMania XXVII, Jim Ross returned to commentate, along with Josh Mathews and new SmackDown color commentator Booker T; the sudden change of commentary was due to a singles match between regular commentators Michael Cole and Lawler. Howard Finkel, who is credited with coming up with the name "WrestleMania" in 1984, has served as the long-standing ring-announcer and has appeared at every event except WrestleMania 33, but since the introduction of the WWE brand extension, Lilian Garcia, Tony Chimel, and Justin Roberts took over as announcers for their respective brand's matches. Four French commentators were at ringside: Jean Brassard and Raymond Rougeau (WrestleMania 13), Phillippe Chéreau, and Christophe Agius (WrestleMania XXX, WrestleMania 31, WrestleMania 32, and WrestleMania 33).

== History ==
=== 1980s ===
Venues of WrestleMania in the 1980s

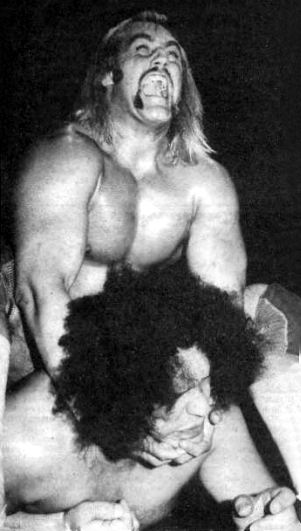
Hulk Hogan and Andre the Giant pictured in 1980, competed in the main event at WrestleMania III in 1987 in front of the then record 93,173 attendance at the Pontiac Silverdome.

The World Wrestling Federation staged the first WrestleMania on March 31, 1985, at Madison Square Garden in New York City. The main event was a tag-team match between WWF World Heavyweight Champion Hulk Hogan and Mr. T, accompanied by Jimmy Snuka against the team of Roddy Piper and Paul Orndorff, who were accompanied by Cowboy Bob Orton. The financial and critical success of the event secured the company's status as the most successful professional wrestling promotion in the United States, rising above competitors such as the National Wrestling Alliance and American Wrestling Association. In attendance were business celebrity Sy Sperling and broadcasting executive Tony D'Angelo. WrestleMania 2 was held the following year and took place in three venues across the country. The Nassau Veterans Memorial Coliseum in Uniondale, New York, the Rosemont Horizon (now Allstate Arena) in the Chicago suburb of Rosemont, Illinois, and the Los Angeles Memorial Sports Arena in Los Angeles. They each featured multiple matches that led up to the main event; this saw WWF World Heavyweight Champion Hulk Hogan defeat King Kong Bundy in a Steel Cage match.

A world indoor attendance-record of 93,173 fans was set at WrestleMania III, which was also the largest paying attendance in the history of professional wrestling at the time. The event is widely considered to be the pinnacle of the 1980s wrestling boom. To make certain that every seat in the Pontiac Silverdome would be filled, WWF decided to exclude the entire state of Michigan from pay-per-view access to the event, which made attending the event the only way for fans in Michigan to see it. The event featured Hulk Hogan defending the WWF World Heavyweight Championship against André the Giant and the WWF Intercontinental Heavyweight Championship match between "Macho Man" Randy Savage and Ricky "The Dragon" Steamboat. The match between Savage and Steamboat would go on to be regarded as one of the greatest matches in WrestleMania history and is acknowledged by many (including Vince McMahon) as having "stolen the show".

WrestleMania IV was held at the Atlantic City Convention Hall in Atlantic City, New Jersey (though on the broadcast it was billed as being held in the Trump Plaza because the adjacent casino hotel was the event's primary sponsor). The event was an all-tournament event to crown a new WWF World Heavyweight Champion, with four non-tournament matches to fill between the gaps in the tournament rounds. The second round of the tournament featured a rematch of the previous year's main event between Hulk Hogan and André the Giant while Randy Savage went on to defeat Ted DiBiase in the finals to win the championship.

The next event, WrestleMania V, returned the event to Atlantic City, in which Hulk Hogan defeated Randy Savage for the WWF World Heavyweight Championship, which Savage had won the previous year. To date, this is the only time consecutive WrestleManias were held in the same venue. The event also saw the WrestleMania in-ring debut of Shawn Michaels, who would later go on to earn the moniker "Mr. WrestleMania".

=== 1990s ===
Venues of WrestleMania in the 1990s

The first time WrestleMania took place outside of the United States was WrestleMania VI, which was held at the SkyDome (now Rogers Centre) in Toronto, Ontario, Canada. In the main event match, Ultimate Warrior won the WWF World Heavyweight Championship from Hulk Hogan. The following year, the event returned to the United States for WrestleMania VII, which was originally scheduled to be held at the outdoors Los Angeles Memorial Coliseum. The event was moved to the adjacent indoors Los Angeles Memorial Sports Arena after poor ticket sales, sold on television as being for security reasons related to the Gulf War and Sgt. Slaughter's storyline defection to Iraq. The event saw Hulk Hogan face defending champion Sgt. Slaughter for the WWF World Heavyweight Championship, while The Undertaker made his WrestleMania debut, defeating Jimmy Snuka. Following this, The Undertaker went undefeated in 21 of his WrestleMania matches until he lost to Brock Lesnar at WrestleMania XXX in 2014. The next edition, WrestleMania VIII, was held in the Hoosier Dome with "Macho Man" Randy Savage defeating Ric Flair for the WWF World Heavyweight Championship and Hulk Hogan defeating Sid Justice via disqualification.

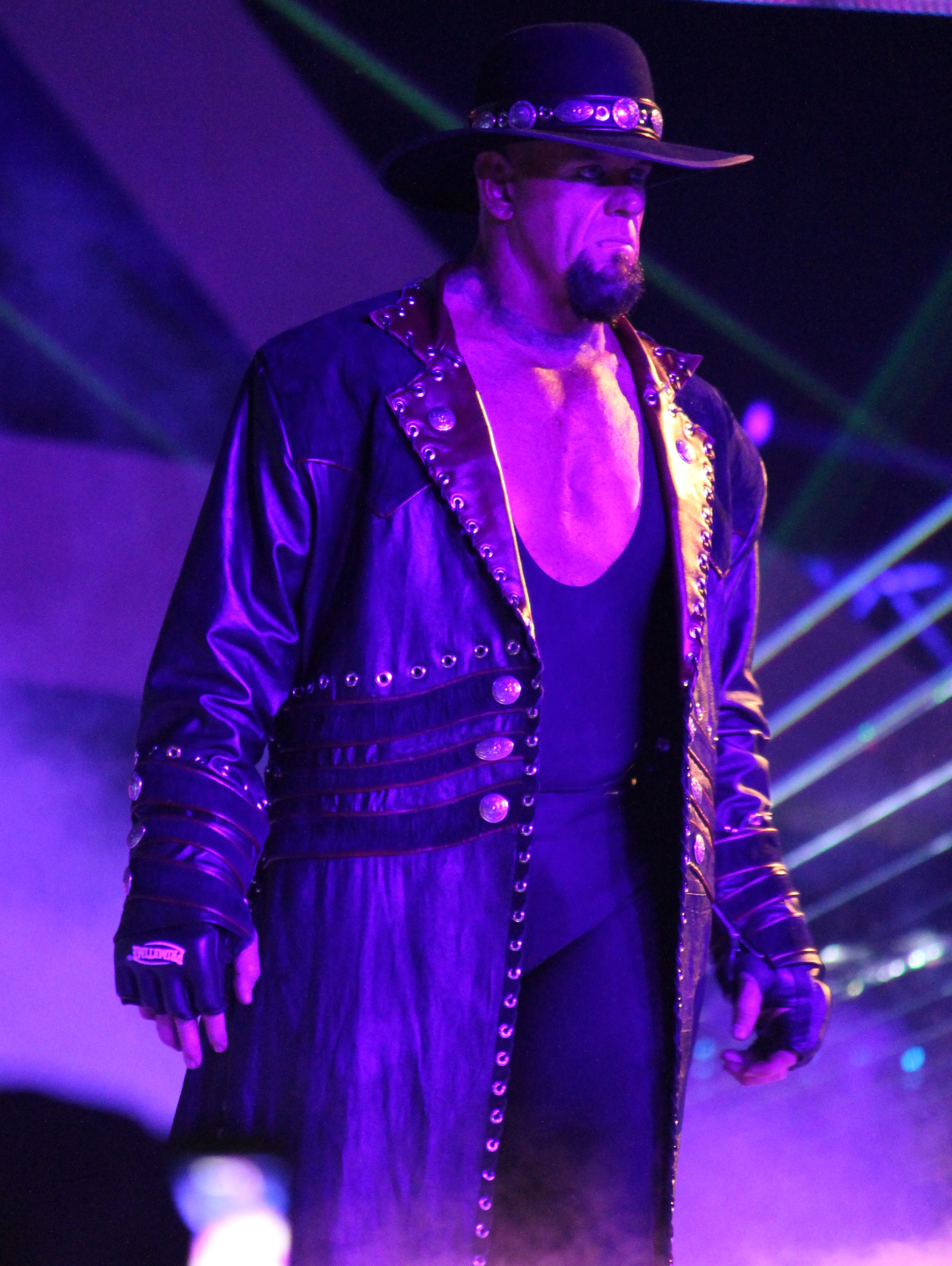
The Undertaker holds the record for 21 victories in a row at WrestleMania, with an overall record of 25–2.

WrestleMania IX was the first WrestleMania held at an outdoor venue. It was also the first and only time in WrestleMania history that the WWF World Heavyweight Championship switched twice. Yokozuna defeated Bret Hart to become the WWF World Heavyweight Champion, only to lose it to Hulk Hogan in an impromptu match. WrestleMania X saw the event's return to Madison Square Garden. The event featured Owen Hart defeating his elder brother Bret; a ladder match for the WWF Intercontinental Championship also headlined, in which Razor Ramon defeated Shawn Michaels. Bret having been defeated earlier won the WWF World Heavyweight Championship from Yokozuna in the main event. Bret is the first wrestler in WrestleMania history to lose his first match and come back to win the WWF World Heavyweight Championship in the main event. After failing to capture the title from Diesel at WrestleMania XI, Michaels defeated Bret Hart to win the WWF World Heavyweight Championship in a 60-minute Iron Man match at WrestleMania XII. The match was widely praised. The event also saw the return of Ultimate Warrior, who defeated Hunter Hearst Helmsley (later known as Triple H) in the latter's WrestleMania debut.

At WrestleMania 13, a submission match pitted Bret Hart and Stone Cold Steve Austin against one another, and The Undertaker defeated Sycho Sid for the WWF World Heavyweight Championship in the main event. The match between Hart and Austin is considered by many fans as one of the best professional wrestling matches of all time and has been voted by IGN as the greatest match in WrestleMania history, and was number 1 among their list of top 20 WrestleMania matches of all time. Various other sources also names the match as the greatest WrestleMania match of all time.

At WrestleMania XIV, Austin defeated Shawn Michaels to become the new WWF World Heavyweight Champion in a match that featured Mike Tyson serving as the special enforcer. Although Tyson had been aligned with Michaels and his stable D-Generation X, Tyson revealed to have been aligned with Austin all along as he personally counted the pinfall and declared Austin the winner. The Undertaker and Kane fought for the first time at this event where The Undertaker won. The following year at WrestleMania XV, Austin defeated The Rock to regain the WWF Championship. The event featured the first of three encounters at WrestleMania between Austin and The Rock in a rivalry of the two most prominent and popular stars of the Attitude Era.

=== 2000s ===
Venues of WrestleMania in the 2000s

WrestleMania 2000 featured the first-ever Triangle Ladder match for the WWF Tag Team Championship, involving The Hardy Boyz (Jeff Hardy and Matt Hardy), The Dudley Boyz (Bubba Ray Dudley and D-Von Dudley), and Edge and Christian. The main event featured WWF Champion Triple H successfully defend his title in a fatal four-way match against The Rock, Big Show, and Mick Foley. This match was billed as having 'a McMahon in every corner' as Triple H was accompanied by Stephanie McMahon, The Rock by Vince McMahon, Big Show by Shane McMahon, and Mick Foley by Linda McMahon.

At WrestleMania X-Seven, Stone Cold defeated The Rock and regained the WWF Championship, aligning himself with his former nemesis Vince McMahon in the process. The event also featured Vince and Shane McMahon in a Street Fight, while Edge and Christian won the WWF Tag Team Championship against the Hardy Boyz and Dudley Boyz in the second Tables, Ladders, and Chairs match. The event was the pinnacle of the 1990s wrestling boom. It was also the first WrestleMania held after the dissolution and WWF's subsequent purchase of the company's rival, World Championship Wrestling (WCW), and the end of the Monday Night War. The event was highly praised. In 2013, WWE released a list of their "15 best pay-per-views ever", with WrestleMania X-Seven ranked at number one.

WrestleMania X8 was the last WrestleMania to be produced under the WWF name, and featured Triple H defeating Chris Jericho to win the Undisputed WWF Championship. Austin, The Rock, and The Undertaker defeated Scott Hall, Hulk Hogan, and Ric Flair respectively, all of whom had rejoined the company after their stints with WCW. Also, Rob Van Dam won his first Intercontinental Championship in his WrestleMania debut.

WrestleMania XIX, which was the first after the company was renamed to World Wrestling Entertainment (WWE), saw Stone Cold's last match, as he faced The Rock for a third time at WrestleMania, ending their long-running feud. Additionally, Hulk Hogan defeated Vince McMahon and Shawn Michaels participated in his first WrestleMania match in five years, defeating Chris Jericho. The World Heavyweight Championship (2002–2013 version) was defended for the first time at the event, with Triple H retaining against Booker T, while Brock Lesnar defeated Kurt Angle to win the WWE Championship.

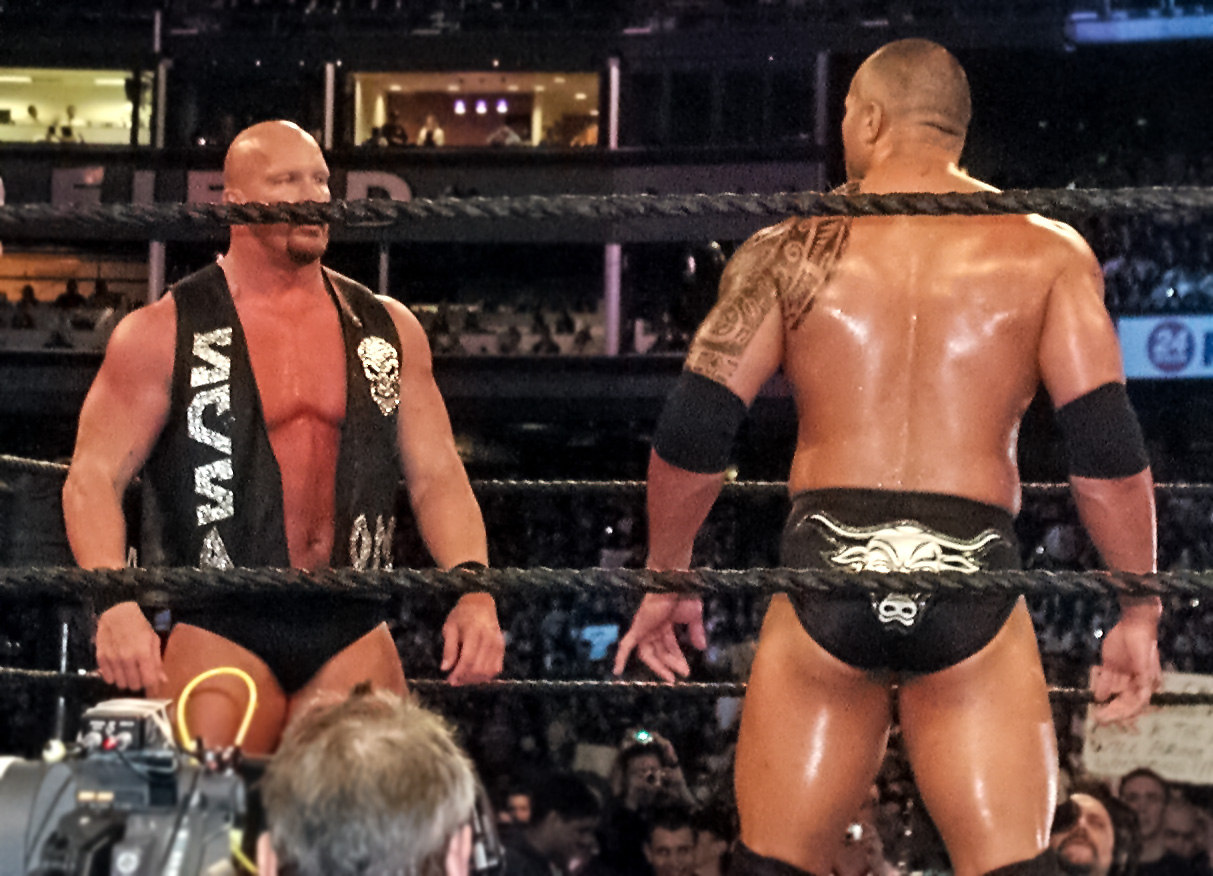
The Rock vs. "Stone Cold" Steve Austin at WrestleMania XIX in their third and final WrestleMania encounter

WWE celebrated the 20th edition of WrestleMania at Madison Square Garden with WrestleMania XX. The event featured The Undertaker (who returned to his Deadman persona) defeating the unmasked Kane in their second encounter and the WWE Championship and World Heavyweight Championship victories of Eddie Guerrero and Chris Benoit, respectively, with Guerrero defeating Kurt Angle to retain the WWE Championship and Benoit defeating Triple H and Shawn Michaels to win the World Heavyweight Championship. The event also featured the Rock 'n' Sock Connection (The Rock and Mick Foley) versus Evolution (Batista, Randy Orton, and Ric Flair) in a 2-on-3 handicap match, which was The Rock's last match for over seven years, as well as Stone Cold as the guest referee in an inter-promotional singles match between the departing superstars Brock Lesnar (who would return to the company eight years later) and Goldberg (who would return 12 years later). The WWE Hall of Fame was also reintroduced and became an annual induction show held the night before or week of WrestleMania.

At WrestleMania 21, the concept of the Money in the Bank ladder match was introduced; a six-man ladder match that featured a briefcase suspended above the ring containing a contract that guaranteed the winning Raw brand participant a world title match at any time and place of their choosing within one year up to the next year's WrestleMania, in which Edge went on to win this match. In the main events, the WWE Championship and the World Heavyweight Championship passed on to John Cena and Batista, respectively, by defeating John "Bradshaw" Layfield and Triple H in their respective matches. Eddie Guerrero's last WrestleMania match took place at WrestleMania 21 against Rey Mysterio, before he died later that year. The event also featured the return of "Stone Cold" Steve Austin after a year-long hiatus, while Kurt Angle defeated Shawn Michaels.

The Money in the Bank ladder match was also held at WrestleMania 22 as a six-man interpromotional match where the winner would get a world title match of their choosing, regardless of the brand they were on, with this match was won by Rob Van Dam. The main events of WrestleMania 22 featured Rey Mysterio win the World Heavyweight Championship against Kurt Angle and Randy Orton in a Triple Threat Match, and John Cena retained the WWE Championship against Triple H. Edge defeated Mick Foley in a Hardcore Rules match, where Edge infamously speared Foley off the ring apron through a flaming table at ringside. WrestleMania 22 also featured Shawn Michaels defeating Vince McMahon in a No Holds Barred match, Undertaker defeating Mark Henry in a casket match, and Mickie James defeat Trish Stratus to win the original WWE Women's Championship.

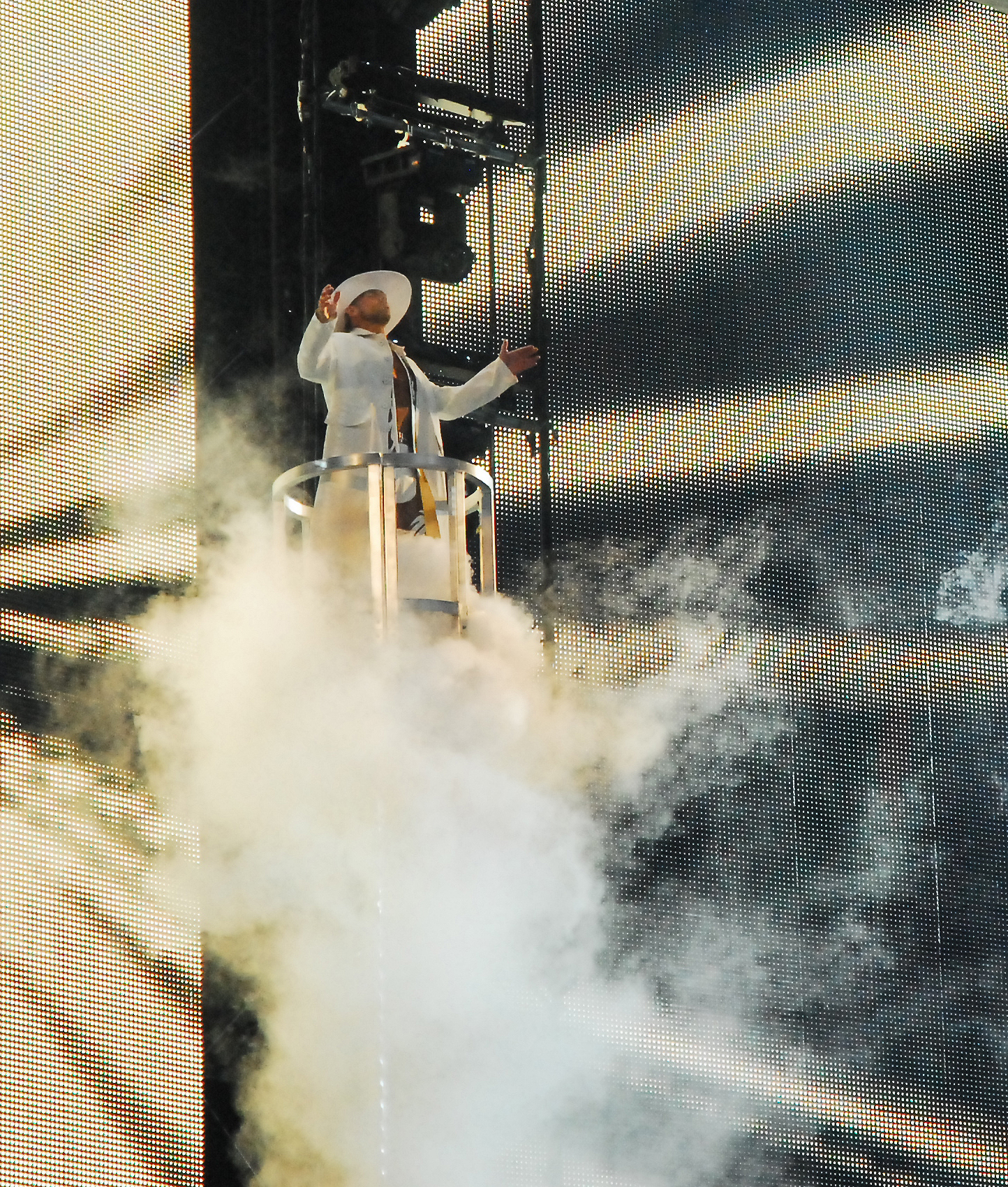
Shawn Michaels earned the moniker "Mr. WrestleMania".

At WrestleMania 23, the Money in the Bank match expanded to include eight men and would include stars from the new ECW brand, which was won by Mr. Kennedy. John Cena would go on to retain his WWE Championship against Shawn Michaels, while The Undertaker would win the World Heavyweight Championship from Batista. Representing Donald Trump, ECW World Champion Bobby Lashley defeated Umaga, who represented Vince McMahon, in a match billed as the "Battle of the Billionaires" and arbitrated by "Stone Cold" Steve Austin. This was also the last WrestleMania where the original WWE Women's Championship was defended when Melina defeated Ashley Massaro in a lumberjills match.

At WrestleMania XXIV, Shawn Michaels defeated Ric Flair in a retirement match, while the Money in the Bank ladder match included seven participants from all three brands which was won by CM Punk, who would also win the match again at WrestleMania 25. The ECW Championship was defended for the only time at a WrestleMania event, when Kane emerged as the new champion in a record 8 seconds, while Randy Orton retained the WWE Championship and The Undertaker won the World Heavyweight Championship for the second consecutive year, defeating Edge. In an encounter that featured major media coverage, boxing world champion Floyd Mayweather Jr. defeated Big Show. The event was the second WrestleMania to be held at an outdoor venue. This was also the last WrestleMania event of the Ruthless Aggression era since later on in Mid-2008 the era ended as the WWE shifted towards a more "kid-friendly" product.

WrestleMania 25 featured Chris Jericho defeating WWE Hall of Famers Roddy Piper, Jimmy Snuka, and Ricky Steamboat in a match that featured appearances by Ric Flair and actor Mickey Rourke. Shawn Michaels unsuccessfully attempted to hand The Undertaker his first defeat at a WrestleMania which received the 2009 Match of the Year award by both Pro Wrestling Illustrated and the Wrestling Observer Newsletter. The WWE Intercontinental Championship was defended at the event for the first time since WrestleMania X8 with Rey Mysterio defeated John "Bradshaw" Layfield. John Cena defeated Edge for the World Heavyweight Championship also involving the Big Show, while Triple H retained the WWE Championship against Randy Orton.

=== 2010s ===
Venues of WrestleMania in the 2010s

At WrestleMania XXVI, the professional wrestling career of Shawn Michaels came to an end as he faced The Undertaker in a highly acclaimed re-match of their encounter from the previous year. The event also featured John Cena winning the WWE Championship and Chris Jericho retaining the World Heavyweight Championship. Following Bret Hart's return to WWE in over twelve years since the Montreal Screwjob incident, Bret Hart defeated Vince McMahon in a No Holds Barred match with members of the Hart wrestling family present. The Money in the Bank ladder match included ten participants from both Raw and SmackDown (the ECW brand was retired in February), and this match was won by Jack Swagger. This was the last Money in the Bank ladder match to be held at a WrestleMania event due to the creation of the Money in the Bank pay-per-view in July that year.

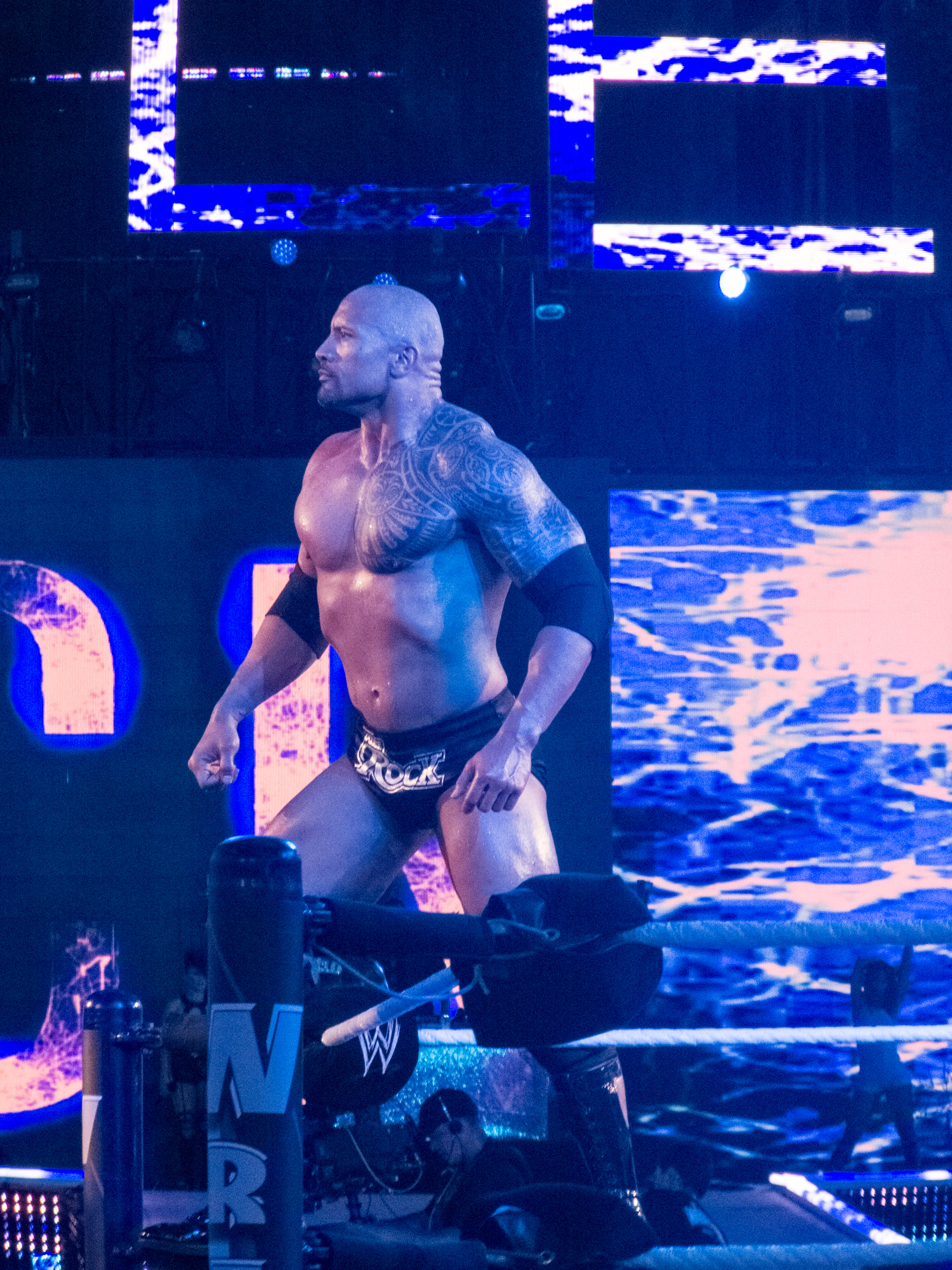
The Rock is the only wrestler to face and defeat Hulk Hogan, "Stone Cold" Steve Austin, and John Cena at WrestleMania.

WrestleMania XXVII featured the return of The Rock following a seven-year hiatus to serve as host for the event. Trish Stratus competed in her first WrestleMania since WrestleMania 22, teaming with John Morrison and Jersey Shore's Nicole "Snooki" Polizzi to defeat LayCool and Dolph Ziggler. Longtime WWE announcers Michael Cole and Jerry Lawler brawled in a match officiated by "Stone Cold" Steve Austin, while Triple H failed in his attempt to avenge Shawn Michaels' loss to The Undertaker from a year prior. This was the first WrestleMania in history in which both the World Heavyweight Champion and WWE Champion were able to successfully retain their titles. World Heavyweight Champion Edge defeated the challenger Alberto Del Rio in what would be Edge's last match before his retirement on April 11, and The Rock closed out the event saluting the fans after laying out John Cena and The Miz with his signature move, the Rock Bottom, following Miz retaining the WWE Championship. This incident would set up the main event for the following year's WrestleMania.

WrestleMania XXVIII had three matches in the upper card. In the first main event, The Undertaker defeated Triple H in a Hell in a Cell match via pinfall, officiated by Shawn Michaels and extending his WrestleMania streak to 20–0. The second main event featured CM Punk retaining the WWE Championship against Chris Jericho, via submission. The third main event featured The Rock defeating John Cena via pinfall in a "Once in a Lifetime" match, announced a year in advance.

In 2013, WrestleMania 29 had 80,676 fans in attendance, becoming the third-highest attended WrestleMania ever. This WrestleMania had three main events. The first saw The Undertaker extend his undefeated streak to 21–0 by defeating CM Punk. Triple H, with the help of Shawn Michaels, defeated Brock Lesnar in a No Holds Barred match; had Triple H lost, he would have had to retire from in-ring competition. In the final match, John Cena avenged his loss from the previous year by defeating The Rock for the WWE Championship, winning the title a record 11th time and setting a record of four victories as a challenger in a world title match at WrestleMania. Other matches included Alberto Del Rio successfully defending the World Heavyweight Championship against Jack Swagger, and Fandango pulling off an upset win over veteran Chris Jericho. In the opening bout, The Shield (Dean Ambrose, Seth Rollins, and Roman Reigns) defeated the team of Big Show, Sheamus, and Randy Orton in their WrestleMania debut.

WrestleMania XXX was the 30th annual WrestleMania event produced by WWE on April 6, 2014, at the Mercedes-Benz Superdome in New Orleans, Louisiana. The event was the first WrestleMania to be held in the state of Louisiana. It saw Daniel Bryan defeat Triple H in the opening match. Per the stipulation, this gave Bryan a spot in the main event, where he won the WWE World Heavyweight Championship by making Batista submit in a triple threat match which also included Randy Orton. It was the only WrestleMania where the WWE Divas Championship was defended, with AJ Lee retaining the title in the "Vickie Guerrero Divas Championship Invitational". WrestleMania XXX also saw the end of The Undertaker's undefeated streak at WrestleMania as he was defeated by Brock Lesnar in what was described as 'the most shocking result in sports-entertainment history'. At WrestleMania XXX, Bray Wyatt's undefeated streak since his debut came to an end at the hands of John Cena. Also, at WrestleMania XXX, The Shield defeated Kane and The New Age Outlaws (Road Dogg and Billy Gunn) in a six-man tag team match, and Cesaro won the first-ever André the Giant Memorial Battle Royal by body-slamming Big Show over the top rope in similar fashion to Hulk Hogan bodyslamming André the Giant at WrestleMania III.

WrestleMania 31 was held at Levi's Stadium in Santa Clara, California, on March 29, 2015. Brock Lesnar defended the WWE World Heavyweight Championship in the main event against Royal Rumble winner Roman Reigns, with Seth Rollins cashing in his Money in the Bank briefcase, turning the bout into a Triple Threat, ending with Rollins pinning Reigns to win the championship. Other main bouts included Sting's first-ever WWE match against Triple H, which he lost, The Undertaker returned and defeated Bray Wyatt to get his 22nd victory at the event's history, Randy Orton defeated Seth Rollins and Rusev lost the United States Championship and his unbeaten streak to John Cena. Another important promoted match was the 7-man ladder match for the Intercontinental Championship, which was won by Daniel Bryan. Also at WrestleMania 31, AJ Lee teamed with Paige to defeat The Bella Twins (Brie Bella and Nikki Bella) in a tag team match, while Big Show won the second annual Andre the Giant Memorial Battle Royal, by last eliminating Damien Mizdow.

WrestleMania 32 was held at AT&T Stadium in Arlington, Texas, on April 3, 2016. WrestleMania 32 broke the attendance record at 101,763 as announced by The Rock at the event. In the main event, Roman Reigns defeated Triple H to win the WWE World Heavyweight Championship. Other bouts included the Undertaker defeating Shane McMahon in a Hell in a Cell match. Had Shane won, he would have gained control of Raw, while had Undertaker lost, this would have been his last WrestleMania. Brock Lesnar defeated Dean Ambrose in a No Holds Barred Street Fight, Charlotte defeated Becky Lynch and Sasha Banks to win the inaugural WWE Women's Championship, Chris Jericho defeated AJ Styles in a singles match, The League of Nations (Sheamus, Rusev, and Alberto Del Rio) (with King Barrett) defeated The New Day (Xavier Woods, Kofi Kingston, and Big E) in a six-man tag match, Zack Ryder won a 7-man ladder match for the Intercontinental Championship, and The Rock defeated Erick Rowan in a record-breaking 6-second match. Also at WrestleMania 32, Baron Corbin won the third annual André the Giant Memorial Battle Royal, by last eliminating Kane.

WrestleMania 33 took place on April 2, 2017, at Camping World Stadium in Orlando, Florida. It was the first WrestleMania since WrestleMania 29 in 2013 to feature two world championships on the line: Raw's Universal Championship, defended for the first time at WrestleMania, and SmackDown's WWE Championship. The main event saw Roman Reigns defeat The Undertaker in a No Holds Barred match giving Undertaker his second loss at WrestleMania. Elsewhere on the event's card, Brock Lesnar defeated Goldberg in a rematch from WrestleMania XX to become the new Universal Champion, Randy Orton defeated Bray Wyatt to win his ninth WWE Championship, and Mojo Rawley won the fourth annual André the Giant Memorial Battle Royal by last eliminating Jinder Mahal. The event also marked the unannounced return of The Hardy Boyz, who won the Raw Tag Team Championship at the event in a fatal four-way tag team ladder match.

WrestleMania 34 was held on April 8, 2018, at the Mercedes-Benz Superdome in New Orleans, Louisiana. In the main event, Brock Lesnar retained the Universal Championship against Roman Reigns. In another main event promoted match, AJ Styles retained the WWE Championship against Shinsuke Nakamura. Other marquee matches saw Kurt Angle and Ronda Rousey defeat Triple H and Stephanie McMahon in a mixed tag team match, which was Rousey's WWE debut match, and Daniel Bryan had his in-ring return after three years, teaming with Shane McMahon to defeat Kevin Owens and Sami Zayn. Also, The Undertaker defeated John Cena in an impromptu match. In another prominent match, Charlotte Flair retained the SmackDown Women's Championship against Asuka, ending Asuka's two-year undefeated streak, and Nicholas, a 10-year old fan, became the youngest champion in WWE history when he teamed with Braun Strowman to defeat Cesaro and Sheamus for the Raw Tag Team Championship, The SmackDown Tag Team Championship was also defended for the first time at WrestleMania, where The Bludgeon Brothers (Harper and Rowan) defeated The Usos (Jey Uso and Jimmy Uso) and The New Day to win the titles, Matt Hardy last eliminated Baron Corbin to win fifth André the Giant Memorial Battle Royal as well as first-ever WrestleMania Women's Battle Royal contested where Naomi won by last eliminating Bayley.

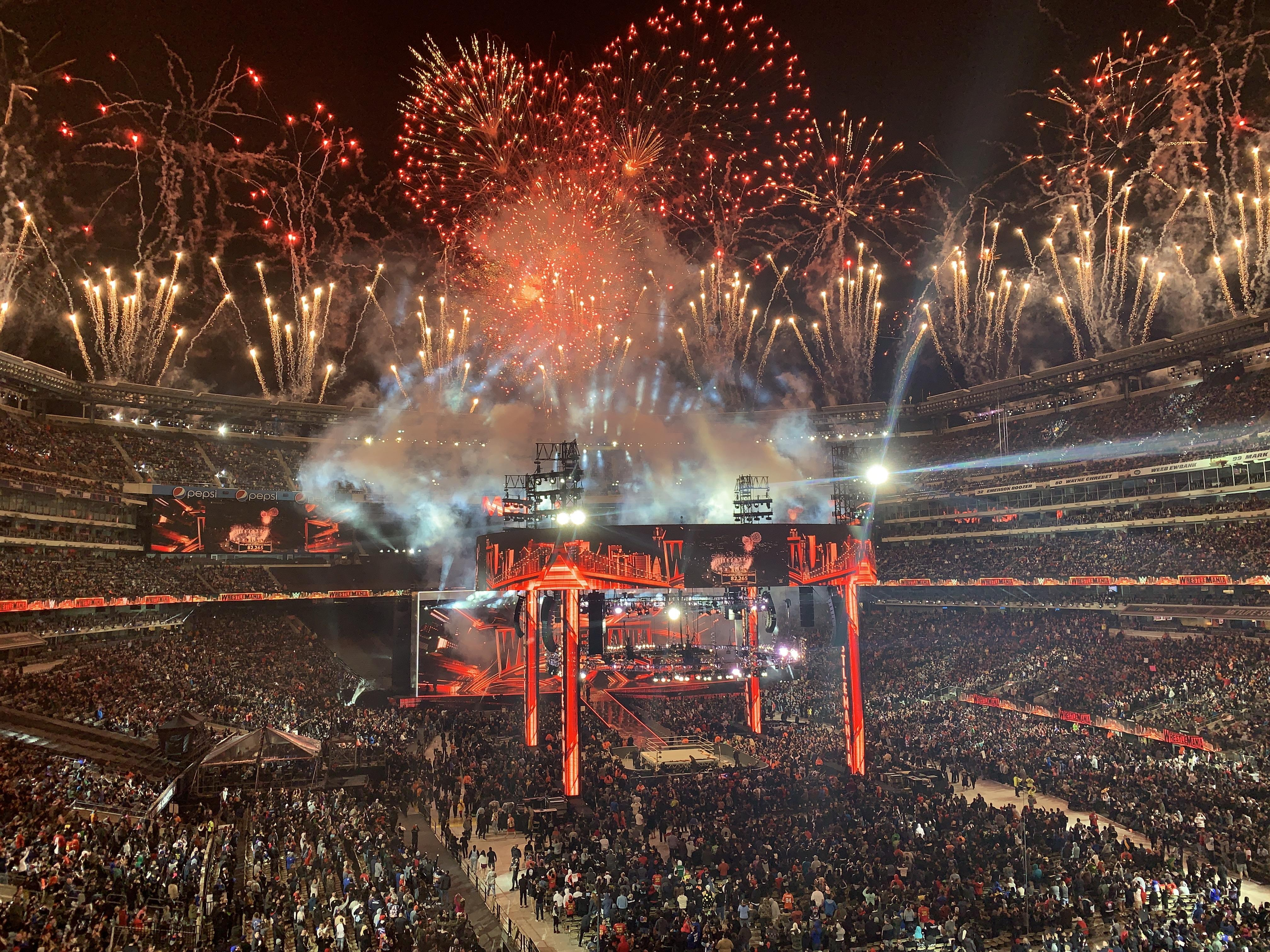
WrestleMania 35 at MetLife Stadium

WrestleMania 35 was held on April 7, 2019, at MetLife Stadium in East Rutherford, New Jersey. At the event, Kofi Kingston became the first African-born WWE Champion after defeating Daniel Bryan, while Seth Rollins defeated Brock Lesnar to win the Universal Championship. The event also saw the retirement of veteran WWE stars Kurt Angle and Batista. For the first time, the main event of WrestleMania was a women's match, with Raw Women's Champion Ronda Rousey, SmackDown Women's Champion Charlotte Flair, and Becky Lynch facing off in a Winner Takes All Triple Threat match for both championships, in which Lynch emerged victorious.

=== 2020s ===
Venues of WrestleMania in the 2020s (North America)
Venues of WrestleMania in the 2020s (Saudi Arabia)

For the first time in WrestleMania's history, WrestleMania 36 was taped and held across two nights. The tapings occurred on March 25 and 26, 2020, at multiple locations including the WWE Performance Center in Orlando, Florida. It then aired on tape delay on April 4 and 5. It was originally scheduled to take place solely on April 5 at the Raymond James Stadium in Tampa, Florida, and to air live, but was moved due to the COVID-19 pandemic. It was only attended by essential personnel, and was the first WWE pay-per-view event unattended by fans. It was the first WrestleMania to promote the NXT brand, which was formerly WWE's developmental brand, but this would be the only to promote NXT as the brand was not featured at the next WrestleMania and it returned to being the developmental brand in September 2021. In the main event for Part 1 of WrestleMania 36, The Undertaker defeated AJ Styles in a Boneyard match, which was produced as a cinematic match and was one of two matches not filmed at the Performance Center—this would in turn be The Undertaker's final match. Braun Strowman also defeated Goldberg to win the Universal Championship while Becky Lynch retained the Raw Women's Championship over NXT's Shayna Baszler. In the main event for Part 2, Drew McIntyre defeated Brock Lesnar to win the WWE Championship; after the show went off the air, a dark match occurred wherein McIntyre retained the title over Big Show in a match described by WWE as the "hidden WrestleMania main event" (which was shown on the April 6 episode of Raw). Also on the show, "The Fiend" Bray Wyatt defeated John Cena in a Firefly Fun House match, which was the other match not filmed at the Performance Center and also produced as a cinematic match, and Charlotte Flair defeated Rhea Ripley to win the NXT Women's Championship, which was the first and thus far only time an NXT title was defended at WrestleMania. Also on Part 2, Edge had his first singles match since 2011 in which he defeated Randy Orton in a Last Man Standing match. Following this, WrestleMania would become a two-night event.

WrestleMania 37 took place on April 10 and 11 at Raymond James Stadium in Tampa, Florida, the original location of WrestleMania 36, to allow for fan attendance—making it the first WWE event to have ticketed fans in attendance during the pandemic, though to a limited capacity of 25,000 for each night. In the main event for WrestleMania 37 Night 1, Bianca Belair defeated Sasha Banks to win the SmackDown Women's Championship, which was the first time two African Americans headlined WrestleMania. Also on the card, Bobby Lashley defeated Drew McIntyre by technical submission to retain the WWE Championship and celebrity Bad Bunny teamed with Damian Priest and defeated The Miz and John Morrison. In the main event of Night 2, Roman Reigns retained the Universal Championship against Edge and Daniel Bryan in a triple threat match.

WrestleMania 38 took place on April 2 and 3, 2022, at AT&T Stadium in Arlington, Texas. As most COVID-19 restrictions had been lifted by that point, this was the first full capacity WrestleMania since 2019, and established a new format for WrestleMania Weekend—a special live WrestleMania SmackDown featuring the André the Giant Memorial Battle Royal (a recent WrestleMania night staple) immediately followed by the WWE Hall of Fame inductions, and then NXT holding its now annual WrestleMania event, Stand & Deliver, the afternoon of Night 1, and then followed by Raw After WrestleMania on Monday. At WrestleMania 38 itself, Cody Rhodes returned as Seth Rollins' "mystery opponent", defeating Rollins in Night 1. In the main event of Night 1, "Stone Cold" Steve Austin came out of retirement for a one match return to defeat Kevin Owens. In the main event of Night 2, Roman Reigns defeated Brock Lesnar in a Winner Takes All match for the WWE Championship and WWE Universal Championship, becoming the first wrestler to hold both titles simultaneously and becoming recognized as the Undisputed WWE Universal Champion, although both titles retained their individual lineages.

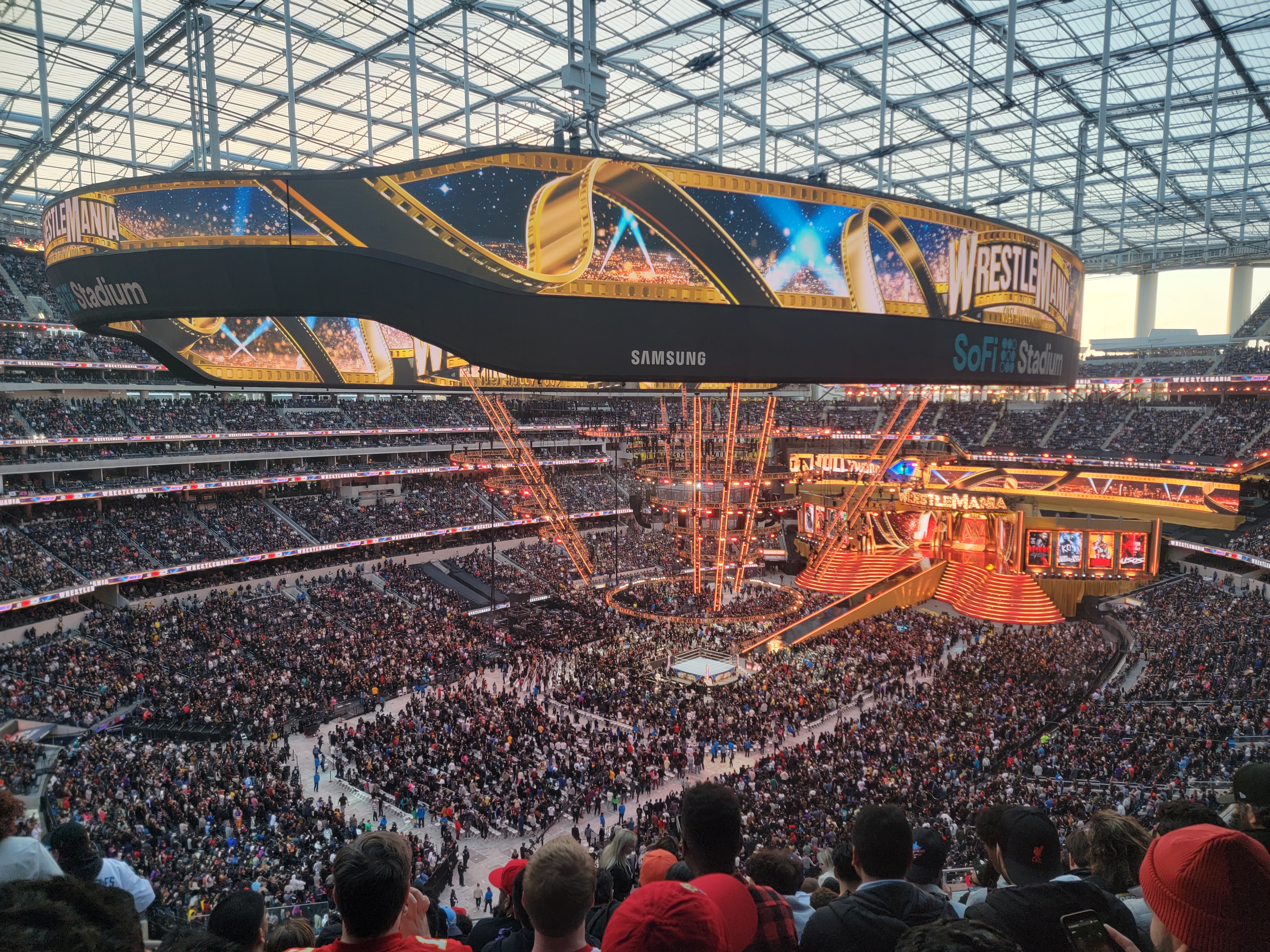
WrestleMania 39 at SoFi Stadium

WrestleMania 39 took place on April 1 and 2, 2023, at SoFi Stadium in Inglewood, California—the original location of WrestleMania 37 before the pandemic forced it to be relocated. As was established the previous year, the WrestleMania Weekend festivities included a live WrestleMania SmackDown (including the André the Giant Memorial Battle Royal) immediately followed by the 2023 WWE Hall of Fame induction ceremony on Friday March 31, then on the afternoon of Saturday April 1, NXT held their Stand & Deliver event, all at the Crypto.com Arena in nearby Los Angeles, which also hosted the post WrestleMania edition of Raw on April 3. The main event of Night 1 of WrestleMania saw Kevin Owens and Sami Zayn defeat The Usos for the Undisputed WWE Tag Team Championship, marking the first time a tag team title match was the main event of a WrestleMania, and only the second time a tag team match was the main event, after WrestleMania I. The match was well received. It was also the first WrestleMania match since 1997 to earn a five stars rating from sports journalist Dave Meltzer. In Night 2's main event, Roman Reigns retained the Undisputed WWE Universal Championship against Cody Rhodes, after Reigns' cousin Solo Sikoa interfered on his behalf.

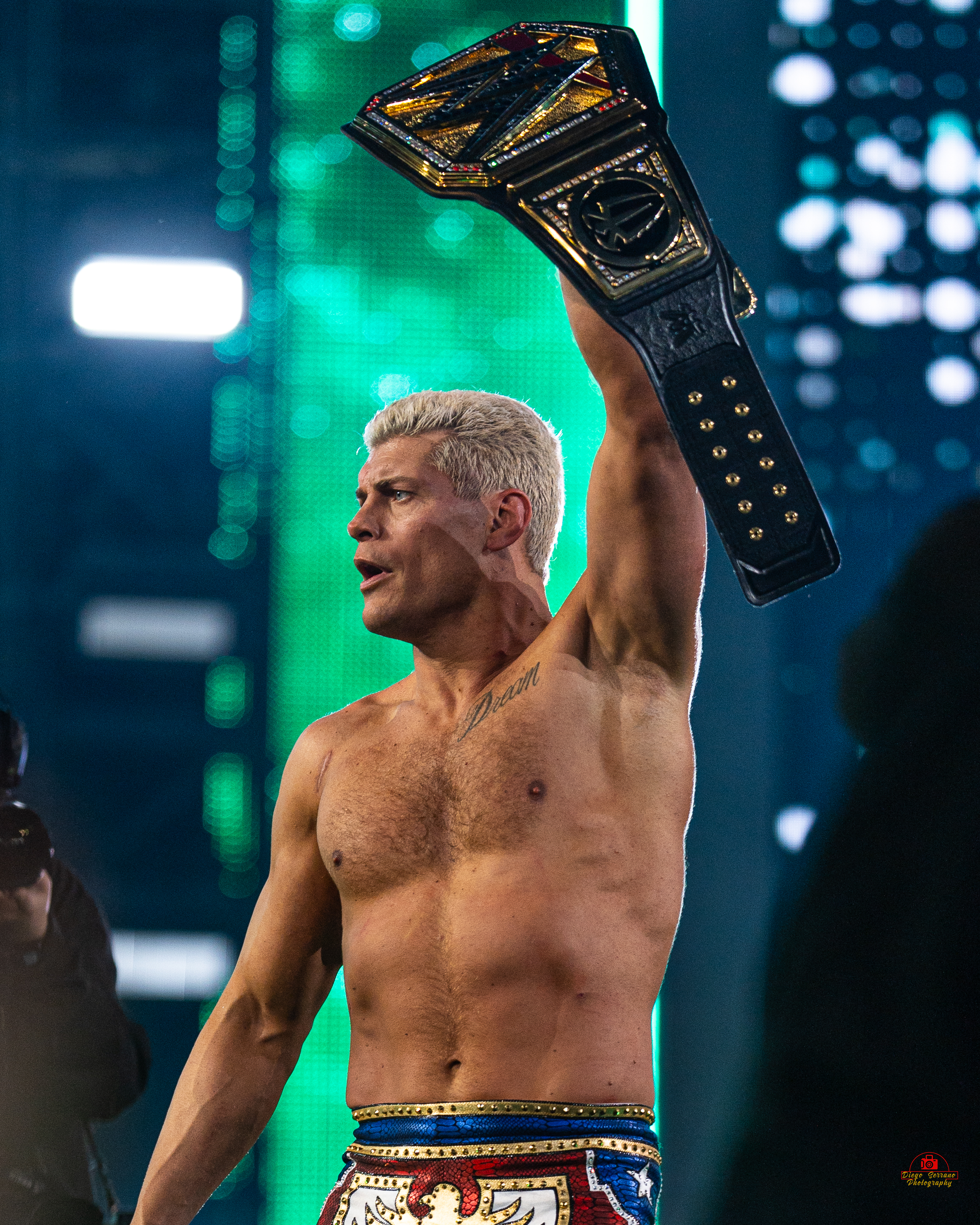
In the main event of WrestleMania XL - Night 2, Cody Rhodes won his first world title by beating Roman Reigns for the Undisputed WWE Universal Championship.

WrestleMania XL took place on April 6 and 7, 2024 at Lincoln Financial Field in Philadelphia, Pennsylvania. Following precedent, the WrestleMania Weekend festivities included a live WrestleMania SmackDown (including the André the Giant Memorial Battle Royal) immediately followed by the 2024 WWE Hall of Fame induction ceremony on Friday April 5, then on the afternoon of Saturday April 6, NXT held their Stand & Deliver event, all at the Wells Fargo Center in Philly, which also hosted the post WrestleMania edition of Raw on Monday April 8. The main event of Night 1 saw The Bloodline (The Rock and Roman Reigns) defeat Cody Rhodes and Seth "Freakin" Rollins. This match determined the stipulation of Night 2's main event. Since Rock and Reigns won, the Undisputed WWE Universal Championship match was a Bloodline Rules match. Had Rhodes and Rollins won, all members of The Bloodline would have been barred from ringside during the championship match. Night 2 witnessed a rematch from last years WrestleMania, as Cody Rhodes defeated Roman Reigns in the Bloodline Rules match to win the Undisputed WWE Universal Championship and end Reigns' generational 1,316 day-long title reign, following interference from Reigns' cousins Jimmy Uso, Solo Sikoa, and The Rock on his behalf, and Jey Uso, John Cena, Seth Rollins and The Undertaker on Rhodes' behalf. Other marquee matches during the two-night event saw Drew McIntyre defeat Rollins for the World Heavyweight Championship before Damian Priest cashed in his Money in the Bank briefcase and won the title from McIntyre, becoming only the second wrestler to successfully win a world championship after a cash-in at WrestleMania, and Sami Zayn defeating Gunther in Night 1 to end the latter's 666-day reign as Intercontinental Champion. Also on the card, Rhea Ripley successfully defended the Women's World Championship against Becky Lynch in the opening match of the first night, Jey Uso defeated his twin brother Jimmy Uso in Night 1, in only the third WrestleMania to feature a match between two real-life brothers after Owen Hart vs Bret Hart at WrestleMania X and Matt Hardy vs. Jeff Hardy at WrestleMania 25, social media influencer and professional boxer Logan Paul beat Randy Orton and Kevin Owens in a triple threat match to retain the United States Championship on the second night, and Bayley defeating Iyo Sky in Night 2 for the WWE Women's Championship to mark her first world title victory at WrestleMania.

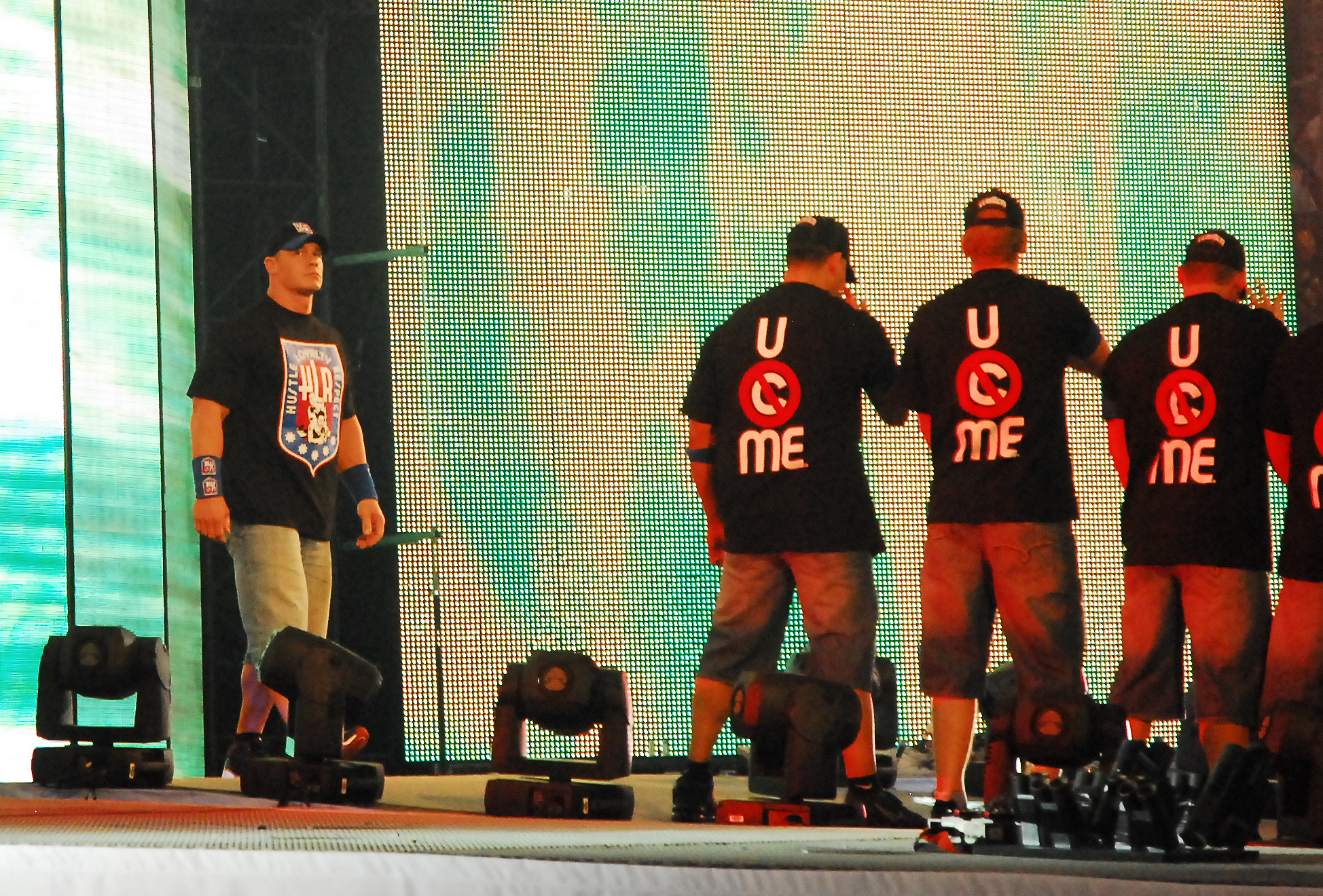
John Cena, who won his first and record 17th world championship at WrestleMania

WrestleMania 41 took place on April 19 and 20, 2025, at Allegiant Stadium in the Las Vegas suburb of Paradise, Nevada. While still roughly in mid-April, this is the latest April date for a WrestleMania, which subsequently marks the first WrestleMania to be held during Easter weekend. Following tradition, the WrestleMania Weekend festivities included a live WrestleMania SmackDown (including the André the Giant Memorial Battle Royal) immediately followed by the 2025 WWE Hall of Fame induction ceremony on Friday April 18, then on the afternoon of Saturday April 19, NXT's Stand & Deliver event. A post WrestleMania edition of Raw on Monday April 21 followed, with all WrestleMania week festivities concluding with the Tuesday April 22 episode of NXT. SmackDown, Stand & Deliver and Raw all took place at the nearby T-Mobile Arena near Vegas, whilst the Hall of Fame ceremony and NXT took place at the Fontainebleau Las Vegas in the BleauLive Theatre. The main event of Night 1 saw Seth Rollins defeat Roman Reigns and CM Punk, the lattermost of which main evented WrestleMania for the first time in his career, in a triple threat match with help from his new manager Paul Heyman, who betrayed both Reigns and Punk to align with Rollins. Night 2 saw John Cena, who had recently turned heel for the first time in 23 years, defeat Cody Rhodes to win the Undisputed WWE Championship and become a record 17 time world champion, breaking the record for most world championship reigns recognized by WWE. This was also Cena's last WrestleMania match due to his retirement from professional wrestling at the end of 2025. In other marquee matches, Jey Uso defeated Gunther to win the World Heavyweight Championship, Tiffany Stratton defeated Charlotte Flair to retain the WWE Women's Championship, and Iyo Sky defeated Rhea Ripley and Bianca Belair in a triple threat match to retain the Women's World Championship.

WrestleMania 42 took place on April 18 and 19, 2026, at Allegiant Stadium in Paradise, Nevada for a second consecutive year. It was originally scheduled to be held at the Caesars Superdome in New Orleans, which would have marked the third WrestleMania in New Orleans and at the stadium, after WrestleMania XXX in 2014 and WrestleMania 34 in 2018; however, on May 22, 2025, it was announced that New Orleans would no longer be hosting the event but is earmarked for a future WrestleMania. On June 7, 2025, it was confirmed that following WrestleMania 41's success, WrestleMania 42 would return to the Allegiant Stadium. Following tradition, the WrestleMania Weekend festivities included a live WrestleMania SmackDown (including the André the Giant Memorial Battle Royal) immediately followed by the 2026 WWE Hall of Fame induction ceremony on Friday April 17. A post WrestleMania edition of Raw on Monday April 20 followed, with all WrestleMania week festivities concluding with the Tuesday April 21 episode of NXT. SmackDown and Raw all took place at the nearby T-Mobile Arena near Vegas, whilst the Hall of Fame ceremony took place at the Park MGM in the Dolby Live adjacent to T-Mobile Arena. The main event of Night 1 saw Cody Rhodes defeat Randy Orton, who was accompanied by color commentator Pat McAfee, to retain the Undisputed WWE Championship. Night 2 saw Roman Reigns defeat CM Punk to win the World Heavyweight Championship. In other marquee matches, Liv Morgan defeated Stephanie Vaquer to win the Women's World Championship, Brie Bella and Paige, who returned to the WWE in her first match since December 2017, defeated The Irresistible Forces (Nia Jax and Lash Legend), Charlotte Flair and Alexa Bliss, and Bayley and Lyra Valkyria to win the WWE Women's Tag Team Championship, Rhea Ripley defeated Jade Cargill to win the WWE Women's Championship, and Oba Femi defeated Brock Lesnar in what would be Lesnar's final WrestleMania match before his retirement from professional wrestling in August 2026.

WrestleMania 43 will be held in Riyadh, Saudi Arabia and is scheduled for 2027. This will be the first WrestleMania held outside of North America and the first in the Middle East, done as part of a 10-year partnership that began in 2018 with the Kingdom in support of Saudi Vision 2030 and as part of the annual Riyadh Season festival.

Additionally, a future WrestleMania will be held at the Lucas Oil Stadium in Indianapolis, Indiana as part of a partnership with the Indiana Sports Corp, which saw the 2025 Royal Rumble, as well as a future SummerSlam, held at the stadium.

== Celebrity involvement ==
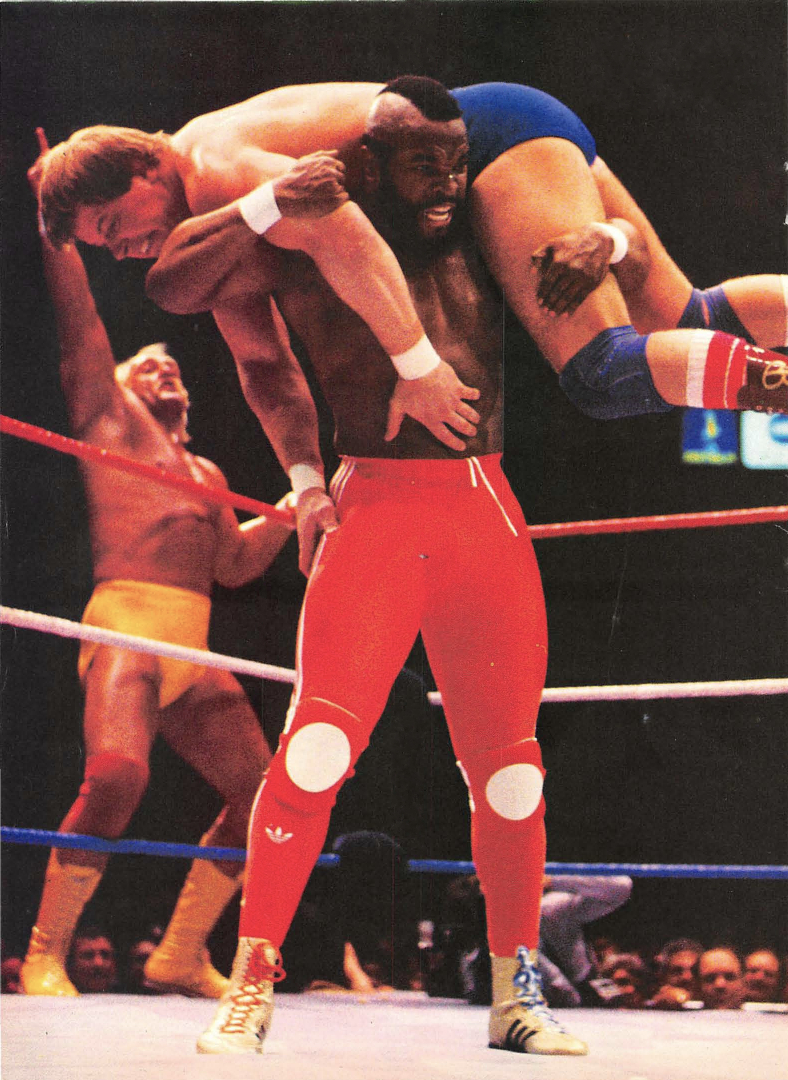
Celebrity Mr. T hoists Roddy Piper up onto his shoulders as Hulk Hogan cheers in the background during the main event of WrestleMania I

Over the years, WrestleMania has featured many celebrity appearances with varying levels of involvement. The main event of the first WrestleMania showcased numerous celebrities along with the wrestlers. Billy Martin served as ring announcer with Liberace as timekeeper, and Muhammad Ali served as an official. Mr. T competed in the main event alongside tag team partner, Hulk Hogan. WrestleMania 2 featured a 20-man battle royal pitting several NFL players against WWF wrestlers, while Lawrence Taylor defeated Bam Bam Bigelow in the main event of WrestleMania XI. Mike Tyson appeared at WrestleMania XIV as the special guest enforcer for the WWF Championship bout between Shawn Michaels and Steve Austin, while professional boxer Butterbean was challenged to a boxing match by Bart Gunn at WrestleMania XV. At WrestleManias XIV, XV, and 2000, Pete Rose became involved in a short feud with Kane that became a running gag with each appearance ending with Rose receiving a Tombstone piledriver or chokeslam from Kane. Big Show faced sumo wrestling yokozuna Akebono in a sumo contest at WrestleMania 21, and fought professional welterweight boxer Floyd Mayweather Jr. at WrestleMania XXIV. Jersey Shore star Nicole "Snooki" Polizzi competed in a 6-person tag team match teaming with Trish Stratus and John Morrison in a winning effort against Dolph Ziggler and LayCool (Layla and Michelle McCool), at WrestleMania XXVII.

The event has also featured live musical performances. Ray Charles, Aretha Franklin, Gladys Knight, Willie Nelson, Reba McEntire, Little Richard, Boyz II Men, Ashanti, Boys Choir of Harlem, Michelle Williams, John Legend, Nicole Scherzinger, Fantasia Barrino, and Keri Hilson have each renditioned the songs "The Star-Spangled Banner" or "America the Beautiful" before the show. Robert Goulet performed "O Canada" at WrestleMania VI. Acts such as Motörhead, Limp Bizkit, Saliva, Run–D.M.C., Salt-n-Pepa, Living Colour, Ice-T, Drowning Pool, Flo Rida, P.O.D., Machine Gun Kelly, Rev Theory, Mark Crozer, Snoop Dogg, and The Wonder Years have also performed during the live entrances of competitors.

== WWE World at WrestleMania ==
In 1988, in association with The Trump Organization, WWF prepared a small festival to celebrate WrestleMania IV, which included autograph signings, a brunch, and a 5K run; the event was held again in 1989 for WrestleMania V. In 1992, a festival was held the day of WrestleMania VIII which included a WWF superstar look-alike contest and a tournament for the WWF WrestleFest arcade game. In 1993, the WWF held a "WrestleMania Brunch" the day of WrestleMania IX at Caesars Palace, during the course of which Lex Luger attacked Bret Hart. In 1994, WWF offered "Fan Fest" for the weekend of WrestleMania X, which allowed fans to step inside a WWF ring, participate in games, meet superstars, and purchase merchandise; the event was followed up in 1995 with another "Fan Fest" for WrestleMania XI. For WrestleMania XV, a pre-event concert known as the "WrestleMania Rage Party" (in reference to that year's theme, "The Ragin' Climax") was held at the Pennsylvania Convention Center and televised by USA Network in an hour-long special, featuring performances by Isaac Hayes and Big Pun.

The following year WWF held its first WrestleMania Axxess event at the Anaheim Convention Center expanding upon the party idea of WrestleMania Rage Party. The event included autograph signings and mementos to inductees of the WWE Hall of Fame. There were also activities where fans could enter a wrestling ring and commentate a wrestling match. In 2001, WrestleMania Axxess was held at the Reliant Hall which expanded upon the event by adding numerous activities including areas where attendees could buy special merchandise, see a production truck and check out special WWE vehicles. From 2002, WrestleMania Axxess would be extended to a three-day event (March 14–16) and would be held at the Canadian National Exhibition. The three-day event included similar activities to that of the one-day line-up. 2003 would be the final WrestleMania Axxess at a convention center for 6 years. From 2004 to 2008, WrestleMania Axxess visited cities around the United States and Canada with a smaller touring version of what was previously presented at regular Axxess events. In 2009 WrestleMania Axxess returned, and had continued every year until 2020. It was held as a four-day event at convention centers and arenas in the host city of that year's WrestleMania. The event was canceled in 2020 due to the COVID-19 pandemic.

Beginning with WrestleMania XL in April 2024, WWE relaunched the event under a new name of WWE World at WrestleMania as part of a partnership with Fanatics Events. The five-day event includes interview panel sessions with WWE wrestlers, a WWE 2K gaming tournament, live podcast recordings, meet-and-greets with wrestlers, and a large merchandise store with various memorabilia honoring WrestleMania's history. Like with WrestleMania Access, WWE World is held at convention centers and arenas in the host city of that year's WrestleMania.

== Events ==
#	Event	Date	Location	Venue	Claimed attendance	Main event match(es)	Ref.
1	WrestleMania	March 31, 1985	New York City	Madison Square Garden	19,121	Hulk Hogan and Mr. T vs. Roddy Piper and Paul Orndorff with Muhammad Ali and Pat Patterson as the special guest referees	
2	WrestleMania 2	April 7, 1986	Uniondale, New York	Nassau Coliseum	16,585	Hulk Hogan (c) vs. King Kong Bundy in a Steel Cage match for the WWF Championship	
2	WrestleMania 2	April 7, 1986	Rosemont, Illinois	Rosemont Horizon	9,000	Hulk Hogan (c) vs. King Kong Bundy in a Steel Cage match for the WWF Championship	
2	WrestleMania 2	April 7, 1986	Los Angeles, California	Los Angeles Memorial Sports Arena	14,500 combined (40,085)	Hulk Hogan (c) vs. King Kong Bundy in a Steel Cage match for the WWF Championship	
3	WrestleMania III	March 29, 1987	Pontiac, Michigan	Pontiac Silverdome	78,000	Hulk Hogan (c) vs. André the Giant for the WWF Championship	
4	WrestleMania IV	March 27, 1988	Atlantic City, New Jersey	Historic Atlantic City Convention Hall	19,199	Randy Savage vs. Ted DiBiase in a tournament final for the vacant WWF Championship	
5	WrestleMania V	April 2, 1989	Atlantic City, New Jersey	Historic Atlantic City Convention Hall	18,946	Randy Savage (c) vs. Hulk Hogan for the WWF Championship	
6	WrestleMania VI	April 1, 1990	Toronto, Ontario, Canada	SkyDome	67,678	Hulk Hogan (WWF) vs. Ultimate Warrior (Intercontinental) in a Winner Takes All match for the WWF Championship and the WWF Intercontinental Heavyweight Championship	
7	WrestleMania VII	March 24, 1991	Los Angeles, California	Los Angeles Memorial Sports Arena	16,158	Sgt. Slaughter (c) vs. Hulk Hogan for the WWF Championship	
8	WrestleMania VIII	April 5, 1992	Indianapolis, Indiana	Hoosier Dome	62,167	Hulk Hogan vs. Sid Justice	
9	WrestleMania IX	April 4, 1993	Paradise, Nevada	Caesars Palace	16,891	Bret Hart (c) vs. Yokozuna for the WWF Championship and then Yokozuna (c) vs. Hulk Hogan for the WWF Championship	
10	WrestleMania X	March 20, 1994	New York City	Madison Square Garden	19,444	Yokozuna (c) vs. Bret Hart for the WWF Championship with Roddy Piper as the special guest referee	
11	WrestleMania XI	April 2, 1995	Hartford, Connecticut	Hartford Civic Center	16,305	Bam Bam Bigelow vs. Lawrence Taylor with Pat Patterson as the special guest referee	
12	WrestleMania XII	March 31, 1996	Anaheim, California	Arrowhead Pond of Anaheim	18,853	Bret Hart (c) vs. Shawn Michaels in a 60-minute Iron Man match for the WWF Championship	
13	WrestleMania 13	March 23, 1997	Rosemont, Illinois	Rosemont Horizon	18,197	Sycho Sid (c) vs. The Undertaker in a No Disqualification match for the WWF Championship	
14	WrestleMania XIV	March 29, 1998	Boston, Massachusetts	FleetCenter	19,028	Shawn Michaels (c) vs. "Stone Cold" Steve Austin for the WWF Championship with Mike Tyson as the special outside enforcer	
15	WrestleMania XV	March 28, 1999	Philadelphia, Pennsylvania	First Union Center	20,276	The Rock (c) vs. "Stone Cold" Steve Austin in a No Disqualification match for the WWF Championship with Mankind as the special guest referee	
16	WrestleMania 2000	April 2, 2000	Anaheim, California	Arrowhead Pond of Anaheim	19,776	Triple H (c) vs. The Rock vs. Big Show vs. Mick Foley in a Fatal Four-Way Elimination match for the WWF Championship	
17	WrestleMania X-Seven	April 1, 2001	Houston, Texas	Reliant Astrodome	67,925	The Rock (c) vs. "Stone Cold" Steve Austin in a No Disqualification match for the WWF Championship	
18	WrestleMania X8	March 17, 2002	Toronto, Ontario, Canada	SkyDome	68,237	Chris Jericho (c) vs. Triple H for the Undisputed WWF Championship	
19	WrestleMania XIX	March 30, 2003	Seattle, Washington	Safeco Field	54,097	Kurt Angle (c) vs. Brock Lesnar for the WWE Championship	
20	WrestleMania XX	March 14, 2004	New York City	Madison Square Garden	20,000	Triple H (c) vs. Chris Benoit vs. Shawn Michaels in a Triple Threat match for the World Heavyweight Championship	
21	WrestleMania 21	April 3, 2005	Los Angeles, California	Staples Center	20,193	Triple H (c) vs. Batista for the World Heavyweight Championship	
22	WrestleMania 22	April 2, 2006	Rosemont, Illinois	Allstate Arena	17,159	John Cena (c) vs. Triple H for the WWE Championship	
23	WrestleMania 23	April 1, 2007	Detroit, Michigan	Ford Field	74,287	John Cena (c) vs. Shawn Michaels for the WWE Championship	
24	WrestleMania XXIV	March 30, 2008	Orlando, Florida	Florida Citrus Bowl	74,635	Edge (c) vs. The Undertaker for the World Heavyweight Championship	
25	WrestleMania 25	April 5, 2009	Houston, Texas	Reliant Stadium	72,744	Triple H (c) vs. Randy Orton for the WWE Championship	
26	WrestleMania XXVI	March 28, 2010	Glendale, Arizona	University of Phoenix Stadium	72,219	The Undertaker vs. Shawn Michaels in a No Disqualification Streak vs. Career match	
27	WrestleMania XXVII	April 3, 2011	Atlanta, Georgia	Georgia Dome	71,617	The Miz (c) vs. John Cena for the WWE Championship	
28	WrestleMania XXVIII	April 1, 2012	Miami Gardens, Florida	Sun Life Stadium	78,363	John Cena vs. The Rock	
29	WrestleMania 29	April 7, 2013	East Rutherford, New Jersey	MetLife Stadium	74,300	The Rock (c) vs. John Cena for the WWE Championship	
30	WrestleMania XXX	April 6, 2014	New Orleans, Louisiana	Mercedes-Benz Superdome	60,000-65,000	Randy Orton (c) vs. Batista vs. Daniel Bryan in a Triple Threat match for the WWE World Heavyweight Championship	
31	WrestleMania 31	March 29, 2015	Santa Clara, California	Levi's Stadium	67,000	Brock Lesnar (c) vs. Roman Reigns vs. Seth Rollins in a Triple Threat match for the WWE World Heavyweight Championship (Note: Rollins was not originally scheduled to be in this match, but he cashed in his Money in the Bank contract while the scheduled Lesnar-Reigns singles match was in progress, turning it into a Triple Threat match.)	
32	WrestleMania 32	April 3, 2016	Arlington, Texas	AT&T Stadium	80,709	Triple H (c) vs. Roman Reigns for the WWE World Heavyweight Championship	
33	WrestleMania 33	April 2, 2017	Orlando, Florida	Camping World Stadium	64,900	The Undertaker vs. Roman Reigns in a No Holds Barred match	
34	WrestleMania 34	April 8, 2018	New Orleans, Louisiana	Mercedes-Benz Superdome	78,133	Brock Lesnar (c) vs. Roman Reigns for the WWE Universal Championship	
35	WrestleMania 35	April 7, 2019	East Rutherford, New Jersey	MetLife Stadium	68,000-70,000	Ronda Rousey (Raw) vs. Charlotte Flair (SmackDown) vs. Becky Lynch in a Winner Takes All Triple Threat match for the WWE Raw Women's Championship and WWE SmackDown Women's Championship	
36	WrestleMania 36	April 4, 2020 (Note: The event was taped on March 25 & 26 and aired on April 4 & 5.)	Orlando, Florida	WWE Performance Center (Note: WrestleMania 36 was originally scheduled to be held at Raymond James Stadium in Tampa, Florida.) (Note: Two matches were taped elsewhere. The Boneyard match was taped on location in the Orlando area, while the Firefly Fun House match was taped at WWE Headquarters in Stamford, Connecticut.)	0 (Note: The event was attended only by essential personnel due to the COVID-19 pandemic.)	The Undertaker vs. AJ Styles in a Boneyard match	
36	WrestleMania 36	April 5, 2020	Orlando, Florida	WWE Performance Center	0	Brock Lesnar (c) vs. Drew McIntyre for the WWE Championship	
37	WrestleMania 37	April 10, 2021	Tampa, Florida	Raymond James Stadium (Note: Originally announced to take place on March 28, 2021, at SoFi Stadium, Inglewood, California; moved due to California state regulations regarding sporting event attendance during the COVID-19 pandemic.)	17,946 (Note: The capacity for each night was limited to approximately 25,000 spectators due to the COVID-19 pandemic. Attendees were separated by pods with physical distancing in place.)	Sasha Banks (c) vs. Bianca Belair for the WWE SmackDown Women's Championship	
37	WrestleMania 37	April 11, 2021	Tampa, Florida	Raymond James Stadium	18,501	Roman Reigns (c) vs. Edge vs. Daniel Bryan in a Triple Threat match for the WWE Universal Championship	
38	WrestleMania 38	April 2, 2022	Arlington, Texas	AT&T Stadium	65,719	Kevin Owens vs. "Stone Cold" Steve Austin in a No Holds Barred match	
38	WrestleMania 38	April 3, 2022	Arlington, Texas	AT&T Stadium	65,653	Brock Lesnar (WWE) vs. Roman Reigns (Universal) in a Winner Takes All match for the WWE Championship and WWE Universal Championship	
39	WrestleMania 39	April 1, 2023	Inglewood, California	SoFi Stadium	67,303	The Usos (Jey Uso and Jimmy Uso) (c) vs. Kevin Owens and Sami Zayn for the Undisputed WWE Tag Team Championship	
39	WrestleMania 39	April 2, 2023	Inglewood, California	SoFi Stadium	67,553	Roman Reigns (c) vs. Cody Rhodes for the Undisputed WWE Universal Championship	
40	WrestleMania XL	April 6, 2024	Philadelphia, Pennsylvania	Lincoln Financial Field	60,036	The Bloodline (The Rock and Roman Reigns) vs. Cody Rhodes and Seth "Freakin" Rollins (Note: This match determined the stipulation of Night 2's main event. Since Rock and Reigns won, the Undisputed WWE Universal Championship match was a Bloodline Rules match. Had Rhodes and Rollins won, all members of The Bloodline would have been barred from ringside during the championship match.)	
40	WrestleMania XL	April 7, 2024	Philadelphia, Pennsylvania	Lincoln Financial Field	60,203	Roman Reigns (c) vs. Cody Rhodes in a Bloodline Rules match for the Undisputed WWE Universal Championship	
41	WrestleMania 41	April 19, 2025	Paradise, Nevada	Allegiant Stadium	58,538	Roman Reigns vs. CM Punk vs. Seth Rollins in a Triple Threat match	
41	WrestleMania 41	April 20, 2025	Paradise, Nevada	Allegiant Stadium	60,103	Cody Rhodes (c) vs. John Cena for the Undisputed WWE Championship	
42	WrestleMania 42	April 18, 2026	Paradise, Nevada	Allegiant Stadium	50,816	Cody Rhodes (c) vs. Randy Orton for the Undisputed WWE Championship	
42	WrestleMania 42	April 19, 2026	Paradise, Nevada	Allegiant Stadium	55,256	CM Punk (c) vs. Roman Reigns for the World Heavyweight Championship	
43	WrestleMania 43	April 2027	Riyadh, Saudi Arabia	TBA		TBA	
43	WrestleMania 43	April 2027	Riyadh, Saudi Arabia	TBA		TBA	
TBA	TBA (Note: In 2024, Indiana Sports Corp and WWE signed a contract to guarantee Lucas Oil Stadium would host one iteration of each of WWE's three largest events: the 2025 Royal Rumble, and a two-night WrestleMania and a two-night SummerSlam in unspecified years.)	TBA	Indianapolis, Indiana	Lucas Oil Stadium			
TBA	TBA (Note: New Orleans was initially announced as the host of WrestleMania 42 in February 2025; in May 2025, WWE announced that the city's hosting of WrestleMania would be delayed to an unspecified year.)	TBA	New Orleans, Louisiana	TBA			
(c) – refers to the champion(s) going into the match

== See also ==
- List of WWE pay-per-view and livestreaming supercards
- Starrcade, the premier event produced by the defunct Jim Crockett Promotions (JCP) and World Championship Wrestling (WCW)
- November to Remember, the premier event produced by the defunct Extreme Championship Wrestling (ECW)
- FMW Anniversary Show, the premier event produced by the defunct Frontier Martial-Arts Wrestling (FMW)
- Euro Catch Festival, the premier event produced by the defunct Catch Wrestling Association (CWA)
- King of Trios, the premier event produced by the defunct Chikara
- Ultima Lucha, the premier event produced by the defunct Lucha Underground (LU)
- Bound for Glory, the premier event produced by Total Nonstop Action Wrestling (TNA)
- Final Battle, the premier event produced by Ring of Honor (ROH)
- Wrestle Kingdom, the premier event produced by New Japan Pro-Wrestling (NJPW)
- Peter Pan, the premier event produced by DDT Pro-Wrestling (DDT)
- Wrestle Princess, the premier event produced by Tokyo Joshi Pro-Wrestling (TJPW)
- CMLL Anniversary Show, the premier event produced by Consejo Mundial de Lucha Libre (CMLL)
- Triplemanía, the premier event produced by Lucha Libre AAA Worldwide (AAA)
- NWA Anniversary Show, the premier event produced by National Wrestling Alliance (NWA)
- Aniversario, the premier event produced by World Wrestling Council (WWC)
- SuperFight, the premier event produced by Major League Wrestling (MLW)
- All In, the premier event produced by All Elite Wrestling (AEW)
