= Melina Perez =

American professional wrestler (born 1979)

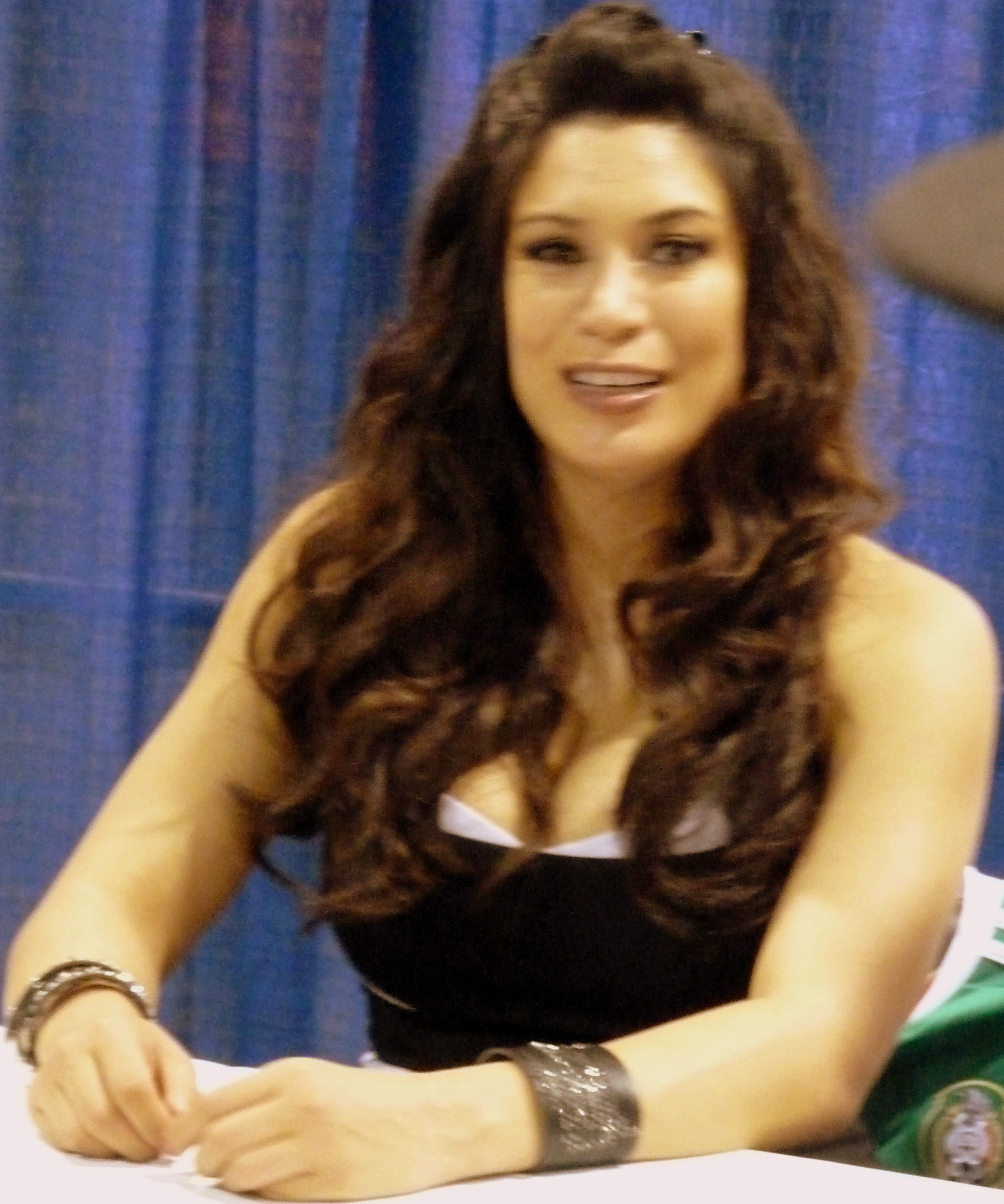
- Melina in 2012

Personal information
- Born: Melina Nava Perez; March 9, 1979 (age 47) Los Angeles, California, U.S.

Professional wrestling career
- Ring name(s): Kyra; Melina; Melina Perez
- Billed height: 5 ft 4 in (1.63 m)
- Billed weight: 121 lb (55 kg)
- Billed from: Los Angeles, California; Hollywood, California
- Trained by: Fit Finlay; Jesse Hernandez; School of Hard Knocks
- Debut: November 2001
- Retired: October 2026

Melina Nava Perez (born March 9, 1979) is an American retired professional wrestler. She is best known for her tenure in WWE under the ring name Melina. She also wrestled for the National Wrestling Alliance (NWA) and Impact Wrestling.

In 2000, Perez began training to be a professional wrestler at Jesse Hernandez's School of Hard Knocks, and made her debut in 2001. In late 2002, Perez auditioned for WWE's reality show Tough Enough III, but was eliminated in the first round, and was inspired by Al Snow to continue pursuing her wrestling career. In March 2004, Perez signed a contract with WWE, and was assigned to Ohio Valley Wrestling (OVW), WWE's developmental territory, where she began managing Johnny Nitro and Joey Mercury, dubbed MNM, to three reigns as WWE Tag Team Champions, as well as Nitro to two reigns as WWE Intercontinental Champion.

Perez is a three-time WWE Women's Champion, and a two-time WWE Divas Champion. After winning her second WWE Divas Championship, Perez became the first woman in WWE history to become a multiple-time champion with both the Women's and Divas titles.

Famed for her flexibility, utilized during her entrance and in her in-ring maneuvers, Perez was called "one of the best wrestlers in the world" by Bret Hart, and cited by WWE as having "perhaps the most impressive arsenal of offensive maneuvers in Diva history."

== Early life ==
Melina Nava Perez was born on March 9, 1979, in Los Angeles and was raised in the High Desert. Perez is of Mexican descent, and speaks English and Spanish fluently.

== Modeling career ==
Perez began her career as a beauty pageant contestant, winning Miss Hawaiian Tropic, Anaheim. During her modelling career, she has won many modelling competitions such as Group USA Bridal Show, Group USA Fashion Show, and Ms. California Belleza Latina. Melina was body painted by artist Mark Greenawalt for a modeling photo shoot in 2007 where she posed with her WWE Women's Championship belt.

== Professional wrestling career ==
=== Early career (2001–2004) ===
Perez began training at Jesse Hernandez's School of Hard Knocks in San Bernardino, California, and made her in-ring debut in November 2001. Many officials stated that she had the most natural ability of any woman who came through their school. In late 2002, Perez auditioned for World Wrestling Entertainment's reality show Tough Enough III, making it through to the final twenty-one, before being eliminated in the final cut of the first episode. After she was eliminated from the contest, trainer Al Snow encouraged her to keep trying to pursue her dream as a wrestler. On November 27, 2003, episode of SmackDown!, Melina was seen as a Native American alongside John Cena during a feast.

=== World Wrestling Entertainment/WWE (2004–2011) ===
==== MNM (2004–2006) ====
Perez debuted in WWE's then-developmental territory OVW in March 2004, being placed in a storyline as John Hennigan's ex-girlfriend. The storyline had Matt Cappotelli introduce her to the ring as a way to taunt Hennigan. Melina, however, turned on Cappotelli and aligned herself with Hennigan, who later changed his ring name to Johnny Nitro. Soon after, the duo began teaming with Joey Matthews, later known as Joey Mercury. The trio became known as MNM and on November 10, Melina managed Mercury and Nitro to win the OVW Southern Tag Team Championship, holding it for over two months. During her time in OVW, Melina, Nitro, and Steven Adkins came up with Melina's trademark split ring entrance.

Melina made her first Raw appearance on November 29, 2004, when Randy Orton was the guest General Manager and hosted a Diva lingerie fashion show. She made another Raw appearance in December, participating in a limbo contest when Chris Jericho was General Manager for the night.

Melina made her official debut in WWE as a heel, resuming her role as the manager of MNM, on the April 14, 2005, episode of SmackDown!. The team interrupted the first ever Carlito's Cabana interview segment, where one half of the WWE Tag Team Champions, Rey Mysterio, was a guest. Melina insulted Mysterio and had Mercury and Nitro attack him, leading to MNM's in-ring debut the next week on SmackDown! in a title match. The team won the match against Mysterio and Eddie Guerrero, starting their first WWE Tag Team Title reign.

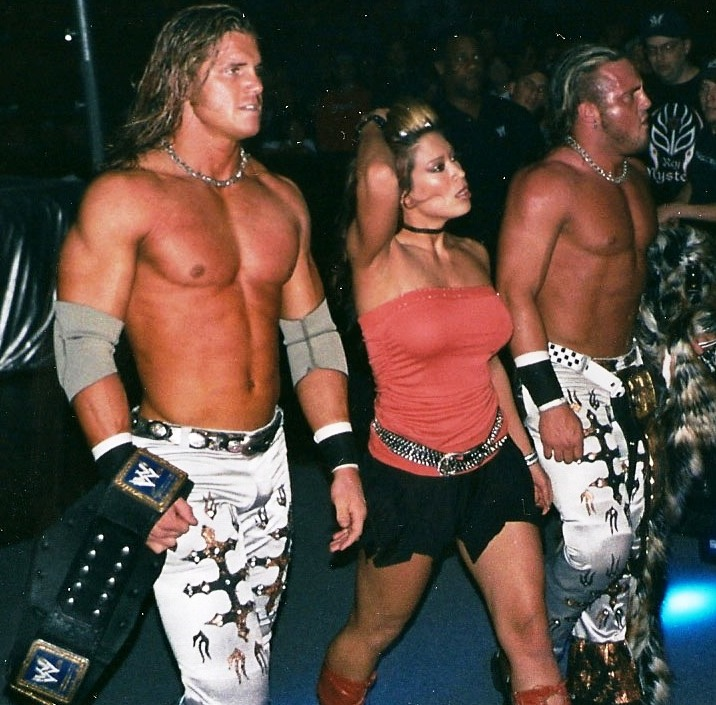
Perez with Johnny Nitro (left) and Joey Mercury (right) as MNM during a WWE SmackDown event in 2006

While managing the Tag Team Champions, Melina's character was developed to be more egotistical, as she declared herself "the most-dominant Diva in WWE". She made her official in-ring debut on June 30 against Michelle McCool, and had her first pay-per-view match against Torrie Wilson at The Great American Bash in a bra and panties match, winning both matches. In the same night, MNM dropped their championships to the Legion of Doom, prompting a new storyline where Melina hired Jillian Hall, a fixer, to assist them. MNM regained the titles on October 28 in a fatal four-Way tag team match. On the Eddie Guerrero Tribute Show, Melina won a Divas battle royal by eliminating the Women's Champion Trish Stratus. The next week, as a part of a new storyline, MNM kidnapped Stratus, tied her up and gagged her for Melina, who then challenged her to a match for the Women's Championship. The two fought at Survivor Series, with Melina losing to Stratus with the help of Mickie James.

During this time, MNM defended their titles against Rey Mysterio and the World Heavyweight Champion Batista. Melina was placed in a storyline where she tried to make Batista call off the match by visiting him in his locker room and attempting to seduce him. The storyline had the two engage in intercourse, after which he simply thanked her for the "warm-up" before leaving to take part in the match, where he and Mysterio defeated MNM for the titles. The storyline played over to the next episode of SmackDown! when, before MNM invoked their rematch clause, Melina held a press conference in the ring where she claimed that Batista had sexually harassed her. During the tag team match, Mark Henry aided MNM in winning back the WWE Tag Team Championship. The storyline with Henry continued into the next year. On the first SmackDown! of 2006, Melina announced that Henry was her personal protection against Batista. He accompanied her and aided the other members of MNM in matches against Batista and Mysterio.

At Judgment Day on May 21, 2006, MNM lost their titles to Paul London and Brian Kendrick. After the match, Melina and Nitro, as part of the storyline, attacked Mercury, blaming him for the loss. Later that night, Melina lost a singles match against Jillian Hall, and after slapping General Manager Theodore Long in anger, she and Nitro were fired from the SmackDown! brand. The team then broke up because off-screen, Nitro and Mercury did not get along, and WWE management decided to send Nitro and Melina to the Raw brand. Melina and Nitro debuted on Raw on May 29, with Nitro losing to WWE Champion John Cena. Melina continued to manage Nitro during his successful hunt for the WWE Intercontinental Championship, and in another storyline with Trish Stratus. The storyline turned into a tag team feud when Carlito teamed with Stratus after he saved her from the attacks of Melina and Nitro. At Saturday Night's Main Event XXXIII on July 15, Melina and Nitro lost to Carlito and Stratus in a mixed tag team match.

==== Women's Champion (2006–2009) ====
After Melina's arrival on Raw, Mick Foley began to mention her in promos and on his WWE.com columns, playing on their real-life friendship, and they soon formed an on-screen friendship. At SummerSlam, Melina was involved in Foley's "I Quit" match against Ric Flair, when Flair threatened to hit her with a barbed wire baseball bat, causing Foley to quit the match to save her. The next night on Raw, the storyline had Vince McMahon order Foley to join the Kiss My Ass club. After begging Foley not to go through with it, Foley "joined the club" to save Melina's job, only to have her suddenly turn on him by delivering a low blow and firing him at the behest of McMahon. The storyline was concocted by Foley to refresh the idea of the Kiss My Ass club. It was also around this time that Melina added another characteristic to her gimmick: screaming loudly at ringside while managing or in tag team action, which became known as the "primal scream".

On January 29, 2007, Melina became the number one contender for the WWE Women's Championship after defeating Maria in a number one contender's match. On the February 5 episode of Raw, Melina received her title match against Mickie James but was unsuccessful. After pinning James in a mixed tag team match, Melina was granted another title match. On the February 19 episode of Raw, as part of her first major singles push, Melina defeated James to win the WWE Women's Championship for the first time in her career and became the first woman of Mexican American descent to win the title. The feud between the two Divas continued and Melina later retained the title in a rematch during the first ever Women's Falls Count Anywhere match in WWE history.

In March, Melina was placed in an angle where she became jealous of SmackDown! Diva Ashley Massaro, who was receiving attention because of her appearance in Playboy. The angle had Melina claim in her blogs that no Playboy cover models were capable of fighting her. This resulted in scheduled matches against former Playboy cover girls Torrie Wilson and Candice Michelle, with both women losing to Melina. The storyline came to an end at WrestleMania 23, where Melina pinned Ashley in a Lumberjill match to retain her Women's Championship. After WrestleMania, Melina organized a photo op with the Women's Championship belt in the ring, but was interrupted by Mickie James, resulting in another storyline feud between the two Divas. On April 24, at a house show in Paris, Melina lost the Women's Championship in a Triple Threat match to James when James pinned Victoria, but on the orders of Jonathan Coachman, she was entitled to a rematch on the same night, where she pinned James by putting her hands on the ropes to regain the title and become a two-time WWE Women's Champion.

On May 7, 2007, Melina began feuding with Playboy cover girl Candice Michelle after she was defeated in a tag team match alongside Victoria against Candice Michelle and Mickie James. Melina continued to lose to Candice in various tag team matches, as well as in non-title bouts over the next few weeks. At Vengeance, Melina lost the Women's Championship to Candice, and failed to recapture the title at The Great American Bash. At SummerSlam, Melina participated in a battle royal to determine the number one contender for the WWE Women's Championship. Melina scored two eliminations and lasted until the final four, before being eliminated by Torrie Wilson and Michelle McCool. On the December 29, 2007 episode of Raw, Melina once again challenged for the WWE Women's Championship in a triple threat match against then-champion Beth Phoenix and Mickie James. Melina was defeated and pinned after suffering a DDT from James, followed by a delayed fisherman suplex, while she was completely unconscious, from Phoenix.

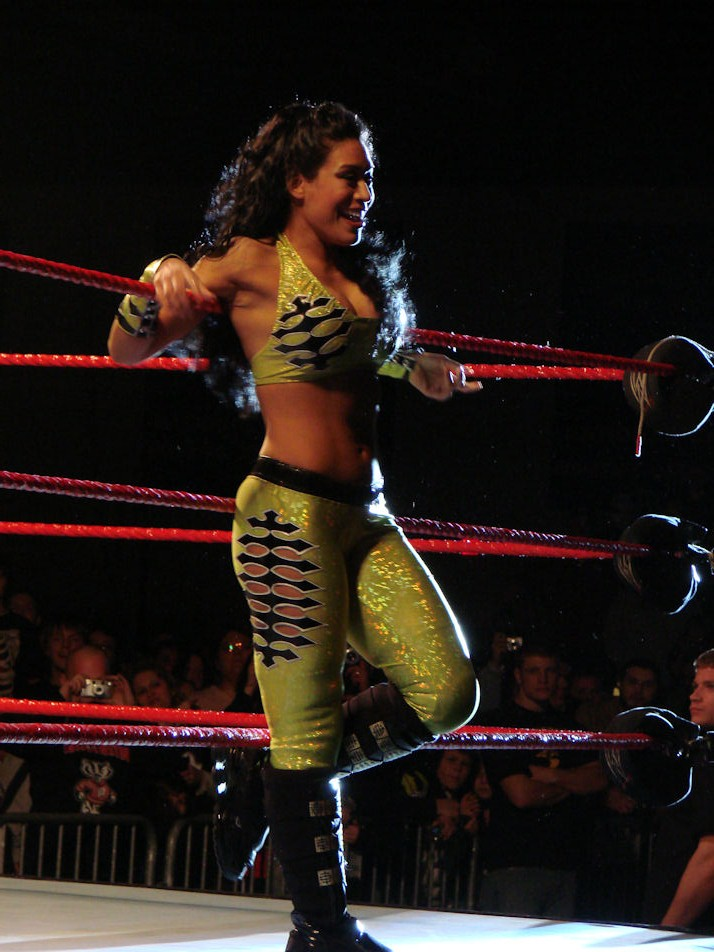
Perez during a WWE house show in 2009

In April 2008, Melina, along with then-ally Beth Phoenix, competed at WrestleMania XXIV in a tag team match, defeating Maria and Ashley. On the May 5 episode of Raw, Melina unintentionally attacked Phoenix with her boot during a lumberjill match with Mickie James. The following week, Phoenix walked out on Melina during a tag match against James and Maria, when Melina accidentally bumped Phoenix off the apron. Melina was then attacked by Phoenix during a backstage segment following the match, leading to Melina turned face. On the May 19 episode of Raw, Melina commentated during Beth Phoenix's match against Maria, which Phoenix won, and Melina would afterwards attack Phoenix with her boot before being attacked by Phoenix. At the One Night Stand pay-per-view, Melina competed in the first ever women's "I Quit" match against Beth Phoenix, but was unsuccessful. The next night on Raw, Melina teamed with former rival Mickie James in a tag team match against Beth Phoenix and Katie Lea in a losing effort. On June 23, 2008, Perez suffered a heel injury after falling from the turnbuckles during a tag team match with Mickie James against Natalya and Victoria.

Melina returned from injury on the November 24 episode of Raw, teaming with former rivals Mickie James and Candice Michelle to defeat Phoenix, Jillian Hall, and Katie Lea Burchill. The following week, she made her singles return by defeating Hall. Following the match, Melina stated her intentions to take the WWE Women's Championship from Beth Phoenix. On December 29, Melina won a six-woman battle royal to become the number one contender for the Championship. After the match, Melina and Phoenix engaged in a confrontation over a fan of Phoenix's named Rosa Mendes, who had attacked Melina. On January 25, 2009, Melina won her third WWE Women's Championship at the Royal Rumble by defeating Phoenix. She retained her championship against Beth Phoenix on February 16 episode of Raw, and again during a dark match at No Way Out. On the March 9 episode of Raw, Melina was defeated by WWE Divas Champion Maryse, in a champion vs. champion Lumberjill Match. At WrestleMania 25, Melina participated in the "Miss Wrestlemania" Battle Royal, where she was not victorious.

==== Divas Champion (2009–2011) ====
On the April 13, 2009, episode of Raw, Melina was drafted back to SmackDown as part of the 2009 WWE Draft, thus making the WWE Women's Championship exclusive to the brand. She began a feud with Michelle McCool, who was named as the number one contender to the title. McCool attacked Melina after her victory over Alicia Fox on the June 19 episode of SmackDown. Melina would then lose the Women's Championship to McCool at The Bash after an interference from Alicia Fox; she failed to regain the championship at Night of Champions. On the September 29 episode of SmackDown, Melina was once again defeated by McCool in a rematch for the championship, thus convincingly ending their feud.

On October 12, Melina was traded back to the Raw brand, and won the WWE Divas Championship from Divas Champion Jillian Hall, who had won the belt from Mickie James only a few minutes earlier, this win also made Melina the first Latina American to hold the title. On the November 23 episode of Raw, Melina teamed up with Mickie James and Kelly Kelly to defeat Jillian Hall and LayCool (Michelle McCool and Layla). After the match, guest timekeeper The Gobbledy Gooker was revealed as Maryse by attacking Melina. The following week, Melina was pinned by Maryse in a tag team match. On the December 7 episode of Raw, Maryse defeated Gail Kim, and following the match, Maryse proceed to attack Kelly Kelly but was stopped by Melina. On December 29, at a WWE live event in Manchester, New Hampshire, Melina tore her ACL during a six-woman tag team match, and as a result she relinquished the Divas Championship on January 4.

Melina made her return on the August 2, 2010, episode of Raw, attacking WWE Divas Champion Alicia Fox after a six-woman tag team match in which she, Jillian Hall, and Tamina defeated Eve Torres, Gail Kim, and Natalya. At SummerSlam, Melina defeated Fox to capture the Divas Championship for the second time in her career. After the match, she was attacked by Michelle McCool and WWE Women's Champion Layla. On the 900th episode of Raw, after winning a match, she was challenged by either Layla or McCool to a Lumberjill match at Night of Champions, to unify the WWE Women's and WWE Divas Championships. McCool would win that match, after Layla attacked Melina during the match, to unify the championships. The unified championship would henceforth be known as the Divas Championship, with the Women's Championship title being retired. On the September 20, 2010, episode of Raw, Melina was defeated by Layla in a match for the WWE Divas Championship. On the October 25 episode of Raw, Melina and Gail Kim were defeated by LayCool in just over a minute.

On the December 20 episode of Raw, Melina became the number one contender to the Divas Championship and turned heel when she slapped then champion Natalya, who had attempted to congratulate her following her victory. When the two fought for the Divas Championship on January 24, 2011, on Raw, Melina was defeated. Following this loss, Melina would be relegated to mainly competing on WWE Superstars in various tag team matches, usually in defeat. On the August 1 episode of Raw, Melina participated in a #1 contender's battle royal, which was won by Beth Phoenix. This would be her final match with WWE, as she was released later that week.

=== Independent circuit (2011–2012) ===
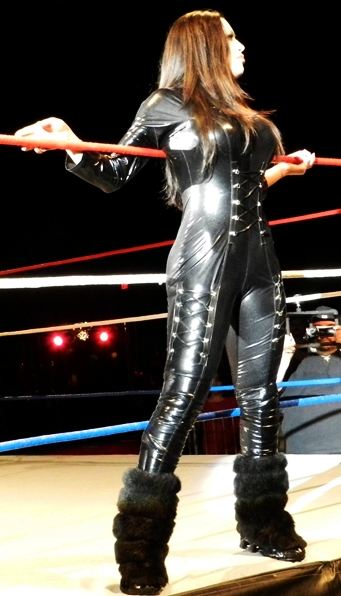
Perez at an independent wrestling event in 2012

In November 2011, Perez wrestled her first match outside of WWE by defeating Lexxus at the Women Superstars Uncensored November 19 pay-per-view. Perez appeared on the World Wrestling Fan Xperience (WWFX) Champions Showcase Tour in Manila, Philippines on February 4, 2012, where she wrestled under her real name. On February 5, 2012, episode of WWFX, Melina defeated Jillian Hall.

Melina appeared at the Family Wrestling Entertainment (FWE) event, signing autographs and serving as Eric Young's valet as he became the new FWE Heavyweight Champion. At the Empire City Showdown, on August 20, Melina made a further appearance for FWE in a segment with Charlie and Jackie Haas. On the April 28 episode of FWE Television, Melina was defeated by Winter with Lita as the special guest referee in a FWE Women's Championship match.

Melina debuted for North East Wrestling on March 23, 2012, competing in a victorious effort against Velvet Sky, but lost to Sky the following day in a rematch.

From June 30 to July 2, 2012, Melina participated in World Wrestling Council's (WWC) Anniversario weekend in Puerto Rico. On the first two nights, Melina defeated Velvet Sky in singles matches, but on the final night, she and Davey Richards were defeated in a mixed tag team match by Sky and Xix Savant.

=== Return to the independent circuit (2015–2022) ===
On June 19, 2015, after a three-year hiatus, Melina returned to the independent circuit at Maryland Championship Wrestling's Ladies Night event as the enforcer in the MCW Women's Championship main event match between Amber Rodriguez and Mickie James; Melina turned heel by attacking James during the match before being attacked by referee Lisa Marie Varon, after which James won the title. On August 5, Melina appeared as a villainess at Lucha Underground's Ultima Lucha helping Johnny Mundo in his match against Alberto El Patron by hitting El Patron with his title belt while the referee was knocked down. On October 16, Melina made her debut for Japanese promotion World Wonder Ring Stardom, during their first American tour in Covina, California. She teamed with Santana Garrett in a tag team match to defeat Hudson Envy and Thunder Rosa.

On June 20, 2016, Melina announced her official in-ring return at Southside Wrestling Entertainment (SWE), taking part at SWE's Queen of The Ring tournament. On October 1, Perez made her official in-ring return in a tag team match at SWE Speed King 2016, teaming with Nixon Newell participating against the team of Alex Windsor and Kay Lee Ray. The match was declared a no contest. On October 2, Melina entered the SWE Queen of the Ring tournament. She defeated Lana Austin and Viper to advance to the finals, when she defeated the Queen Of Southside champion Kay Lee Ray, winning the tournament and the championship in the process. At the same day, Melina wrestled SWE KirbyMania, in an eight-man tag team match. She teamed with Jessicka Havok, Leah Vaughan, and Nixon Newell, and defeated the team of Alex Windsor, Kasey Owens, Kay Lee Ray and Viper. On October 29, at SWE 6th Anniversary Show, Melina successfully defended her championship against Alex Windsor, Dahlia Black, Kay Lee Ray, Nixon Newell, and Ruby Summers in a six-way match. On November 5, Melina defeated Renee Michelle to capture the MCW Women's Championship for the first time.

On October 5, 2017, she left the title vacated due to injury, ending her reign at 350 days.

After a two-year absence of in-ring activity, Melina returned on June 11, 2018, at promotion A Matter of Pride Wrestling to face off against The Boy Diva Rick Cataldo. The following month Melina attacked Cataldo with a bouquet of flowers given to Cataldo as a sign of affection by Vinny Pacifico. On April 4, 2019, Melina defeated Sonny Kiss at A Matter of Pride's Divamania in a match that qualified her to compete in the Chris Kanyon Memorial Battle Royal to determine the company's inaugural Champion; she was eliminated by eventual winner, Eddy McQueen. In August 2019 Perez faced Jamie Senegal in singles match at A Matter of Pride in a winning effort. Melina continued her feud with Rick Cataldo at A Matter Of Pride, notably attacking him on his wedding night and trying to convince Rick's husband Vinny Pacifico-Cataldo to stand up for himself against his abusive life partner.

Melina debuted for Outlaw Wrestling on June 20, 2019; teaming with Bull James in defeating Anthony Greene and the Platinum Hunnies, and picked up her first singles win for the promotion on August 15, defeating Solo Darling. Melina began turning heel during her match against Kimber Lee on September 26; feigning an injury before attacking Lee and defeating her. Post-match, Melina cemented her heel turn by attacking Lee and an injured Willow Nightingale, leading to a grudge match on November 9, which Melina won over Nightingale. In April 2021, Melina debuted for Southwest Wrestling Entertainment as the villainous manager for Big Cazz XL (the former Big Cass in WWE). On May 7, 2022, Melina was defeated by Scarlett Bordeaux at WrestlePro Mayhem. On September 16, 2022 Melina was defeated by Mandy Leon in a fatal four way match for the MCW Women's Title at MCW Ladies Night, which also featured Gia Scott and Leila Grey.

=== National Wrestling Alliance (2019–2021) ===
Melina made her National Wrestling Alliance (NWA) debut on the November 19, 2019, episode of NWA Power (taped on October 1, 2019), aligning with Marti Belle and Thunder Rosa after helping them defeat NWA World Women's Champion Allysin Kay and Ashley Vox, establishing herself as a villainess. Melina made her NWA in-ring debut on Into the Fire, on December 14, teaming with Belle as they unsuccessfully challenged Kay and ODB. Following NWA's 18 month hiatus due to the COVID-19 pandemic, Melina resumed her role as Thunder Rosa's manager, and began a feud with Kamille and a debuting Taryn Terrell, turning face in the process. At NWA When Our Shadows Fall, on June 6, 2021, Melina teamed with Rosa in a losing effort against Terrell and Kylie Rae, despite Melina's wrestling on a retorn ACL. Melina turned heel once again and briefly feuded with Kylie Rae, leading to a match on the June 29 episode of NWA Power, which Melina lost. A few months later, Melina won a number one contenders triple threat match against Chelsea Green and Kylie Rae for a shot at Kamille's NWA World Women's Championship at NWA Hard Times 2, which she lost.

=== Sporadic WWE appearances (2019–2025) ===
On the July 22, 2019, episode of Raw, Melina made her first appearance in WWE in almost eight years at the Raw Reunion, acting as a referee in 24/7 Championship bouts between Kelly Kelly, Candice Michelle, and Alundra Blayze. PWInsider reported in September 2020 that Perez had signed a contract to return to WWE but Perez informed in February 2021 that, while WWE and she talked, they did not come to an agreement. She would make another appearance on January 4, 2021, at WWE Raw Legends Night. On January 29, 2022, Melina made a surprise return as the second entrant in the 2022 Royal Rumble match with Sasha Banks. She was, however, eliminated by Banks in less than a minute.

On July 13, 2025, Perez made surprise appearance in the crowd during the Evolution event, where she was honored as one of the pioneers of WWE's Women's Evolution alongside several female WWE Hall of Famers and legends.

=== Impact Wrestling (2021) ===
Melina made her TNA debut on the August 5, 2021, episode of Impact, where she was revealed as the challenger for Deonna Purrazzo's Impact Knockouts Championship at NWA EmPowerrr. On the August 19 episode of Impact!, she made her in-ring debut, defeating Brandi Lauren. After the match, she was attacked by Purrazzo and Matthew Rehwoldt but was saved by Trey Miguel, setting up a mixed tag team match at Emergence. At Emergence, they lost to Purrazzo and Rehwoldt. The feud ended at NWA EmPowerrr when Melina unsuccessfully challenged Deonna Purrazzo for the Impact Knockouts Championship after a hard fought contest. At Bound for Glory, Melina competed in the 20-wrestler Intergender Call Your Shot Gauntlet match which was won by Moose.

=== Second return to independent circuit (2025–2026) ===
Perez returned to in-ring wrestling at a battle royale for Pro Wrestling Society at PWS Wrestle Nation on May 10, 2025. At Drag Attack Divas In Paris on August 29, she defeated Jazze Parry and JGU in a three way match. On July 17, 2026, Perez defeated Mila Smidt at the ABC 16eme Festival International De Catch in a singles match. In October 2026, Perez stated that she had no desire to return to wrestling.

== Personal life ==
Perez was involved in an on-off relationship with fellow professional wrestler John Hennigan, better known by the ring name John Morrison, from 2003 to 2015.

On January 10, 2025, it was reported that Perez hadn't reported safe from the Los Angeles fires and hadn't returned any phone calls. On January 12, it was announced Perez was found safe.

== Other media ==
On April 13, 2008, she appeared in an episode of Celebrity Fit Club Boot Camp along with Mickie James, Layla, and Kelly Kelly.

Perez has appeared in five WWE video games. She made her in-game debut in SmackDown vs. Raw 2007 and also appears in SmackDown vs. Raw 2008, SmackDown vs. Raw 2009, SmackDown vs. Raw 2010 and SmackDown vs. Raw 2011.

== Filmography ==
=== Film ===
Year	Title	Role	Notes
2011	Adventures of Serial Buddies	Devin	Film Debut
2013	20 Feet Below: The Darkness Descending	Jade	

=== Television ===
Year	Title	Role	Notes
2008	Pop Stars 2 Control	Auditioner	
2008	Celebrity Fit Club: Boot Camp	Herself	1 episode
2010	Undateable	Herself	Episode: "Hour 1–5"
2011	Cake Boss	Herself	
2012	Bad Girls Club	Herself	After Buzz Show

=== Podcasts ===
Year	Title	Role	Notes
2020	Chasing Glory With Lilian Garcia	Herself	1 episode
2021	The Grizzly Podcast	Herself	1 episode
2022	WrestlePurists	Herself	1 episode
2018-2023	Ring The Belle	Herself	3 episodes
2023-2025	Mike Lewis Podcast	Herself	2 episodes

== Championships and accomplishments ==
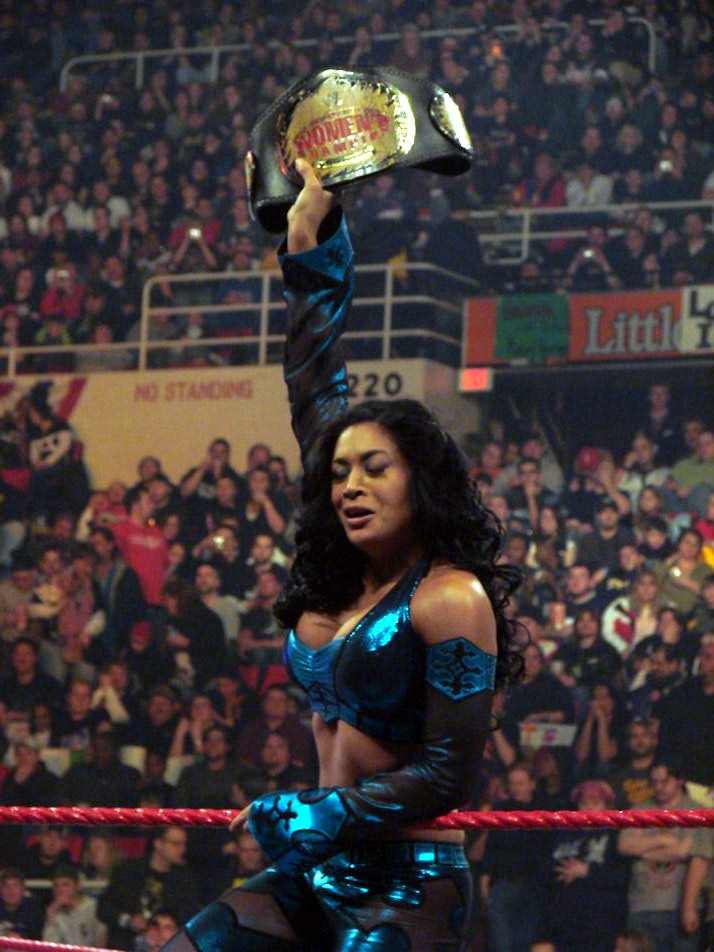
Melina is a three-time WWE Women's Champion...

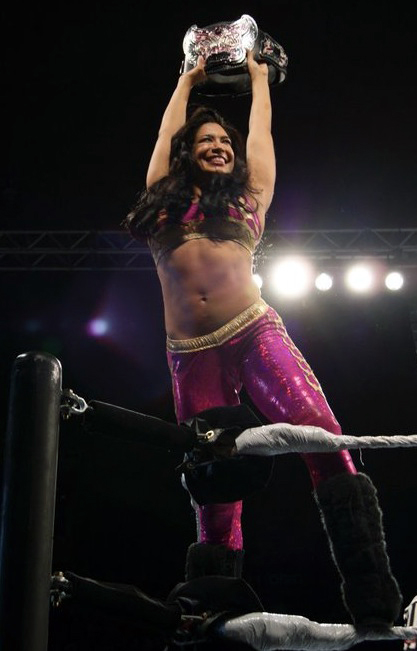
...and a two-time WWE Divas Champion, making her an overall five-time Women's Champion in WWE.

- The Baltimore Sun
  - Woman of the Year (2009)
- Battle Championship Wrestling
  - BCW Women's Championship (1 time)
- Empire Wrestling Federation
  - EWF Hall of Fame (2016)
- Face 2 Face Wrestling
  - F2F Women's Championship (1 time)
- Maryland Championship Wrestling
  - MCW Women's Championship (1 time)
- Pro Wrestling Illustrated
  - Ranked No. 3 of the top 50 female wrestlers in the PWI Female 50 in 2009
- Southside Wrestling Entertainment
  - Queen of Southside Championship (1 time)
  - Queen of the Ring (2016)
- World Wrestling Entertainment
  - WWE Divas Championship (2 times)
  - WWE Women's Championship (3 times)
- Warriors of Wrestling
  - WOW Women's Championship (1 time)
- Women's Wrestling Hall of Fame
  - Class of 2026

== Notes ==
- Bautista, Dave and Jeremy Roberts (October 2007). Batista Unleashed. WWE. ISBN 978-1-4165-4410-4.
- Foley, Mick (2007). Hardcore Diaries. Pocket Books. p. 384. ISBN 978-1-4165-3157-9.
- Pro Wrestling Illustrated presents: 2007 Wrestling almanac & book of facts. Kappa Publishing. 2007.
