= Ultima Lucha =

- Promotions: Lucha Underground
- First event: Ultima Lucha 1

Ultima Lucha (Spanish for "Final Fight") was a professional wrestling event that aired as the season finale of the Lucha Underground television series. The event was created in 2015 to be Lucha Underground's premier event of the year, similar to WWE's WrestleMania event.

== History ==
On March 25, 2015, it was announced that Lucha Underground would be holding their first major event in early August 2015 entitled Ultima Lucha.

== Events ==
#	Event	Aired Date	City	Venue	Main Event	Ref
1	Ultima Lucha 1	July 29, 2015; August 5, 2015	Boyle Heights, California	Lucha Underground Arena	Part 1: Drago vs. Hernandez; Part 2: Prince Puma (c) vs. Mil Muertes (with Catrina) for the Lucha Underground Championship	
2	Ultima Lucha Dos	July 6, 2016; July 13, 2016; July 20, 2016	Boyle Heights, California	Lucha Underground Arena	Part 1: Dr. Wagner Jr. (with Famous B and The Beautiful Brenda) vs. Son of Havoc for Son of Havoc's Unique Opportunity; Part 2: Mil Muertes (with Catrina) vs. King Cuerno; Part 3: Rey Mysterio vs. Prince Puma	
3	Ultima Lucha Tres	September 27, 2017; October 4, 2017; October 11, 2017; October 18, 2017	Boyle Heights, California	Lucha Underground Arena	Part 1: Killshot vs. Dante Fox in a Hell of War match Part 2: Fénix vs. Marty "The Moth" Martinez (with Mariposa) in a Mask vs. Hair match Part 3: Pentagón Dark vs. Son of Havoc in a Ladder match for the vacant Lucha Underground Gift of the Gods Championship; Part 4: Prince Puma (c) vs. Pentagón Dark in a Loser Leaves Lucha Underground match for the Lucha Underground Championship	
4	Ultima Lucha Cuatro	October 31, 2018; November 7, 2018	Los Angeles, California	Lucha Underground Arena	Part 1: Son of Havoc vs. Killshot in a Mask vs. Mask match Part 2: Pentagón Dark (c) vs. Jake Strong for the Lucha Underground Championship	

== See also ==
- WrestleMania, the premier event produced by WWE
- Starrcade, the premier event produced by the defunct World Championship Wrestling
- November to Remember, the premier event produced by the defunct Extreme Championship Wrestling
- Bound for Glory, the premier event produced by Impact Wrestling
- Final Battle, the premier event produced by Ring of Honor
- January 4 Tokyo Dome Show, the premier event produced by New Japan Pro-Wrestling
- CMLL Anniversary Show, the premier event produced by Consejo Mundial de Lucha Libre
- Triplemanía, the premier event produced by Lucha Libre AAA World Wide
- King of Trios, the premier event produced by Chikara
