= WWE Capitol Punishment =

2011 WWE pay-per-view event

Capitol Punishment
- Promotional poster depicting Rey Mysterio, then U.S. President Barack Obama, and John Cena
- Promotion: WWE
- Brand(s): Raw; SmackDown
- Date: June 19, 2011
- City: Washington, D.C.
- Venue: Verizon Center
- Attendance: 9,850
- Buy rate: 170,000

Pay-per-view chronology
← Previous; Over the Limit	Next → Money in the Bank

Capitol Punishment was a 2011 professional wrestling pay-per-view (PPV) event produced by WWE. The event took place on June 19, 2011, at the Verizon Center in Washington, D.C. and was held for wrestlers from the promotion's Raw and SmackDown brand divisions. The event's name was a play on the term capital punishment as well as a reference to it being held in Washington, D.C., the capital of the United States.

Nine matches were contested at the event, including one on the pre-show. In the main event, John Cena defeated R-Truth to retain Raw's WWE Championship. In other prominent matches, Randy Orton defeated Christian to retain SmackDown's World Heavyweight Championship, Ezekiel Jackson defeated Wade Barrett to win SmackDown's Intercontinental Championship, and Dolph Ziggler defeated Kofi Kingston to win Raw's United States Championship.

This was a one-off event, as although Capitol Punishment had replaced Fatal 4-Way as the June 2011 PPV event, Capitol Punishment itself was replaced by a reinstated No Way Out in June 2012. Capitol Punishment had a PPV buy rate of 170,000, up from the 143,000 buys that Fatal 4-Way received in June the previous year.

== Production ==
=== Background ===
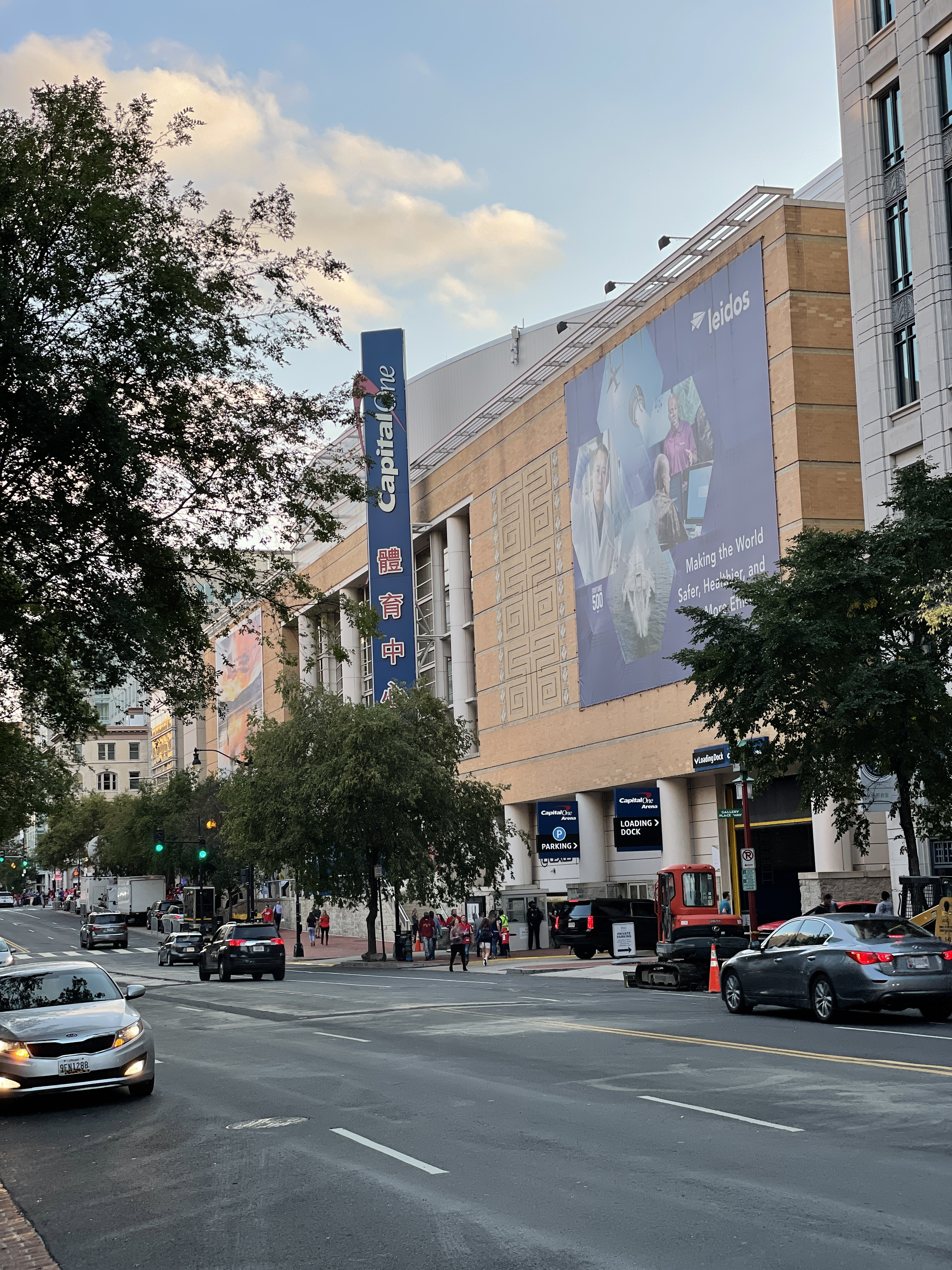
The event was held at the Verizon Center in Washington, D.C.

In June 2010, WWE held a professional wrestling pay-per-view (PPV) event titled Fatal 4-Way. The following year, WWE replaced Fatal 4-Way with an event titled Capitol Punishment, and it was scheduled for June 19, 2011, at the Verizon Center in Washington, D.C. and featured wrestlers from the Raw and SmackDown brands. Promotion for the event was centered around its setting of Washington, D.C., the capital of the United States, and the event's name was also a play on the term capital punishment.

WWE produced a video to promote the event using actual press footage of U.S. president Barack Obama spliced and edited with footage that WWE recorded using actors. The video was intended to show Obama answering questions about Capitol Punishment in a press conference. First airing on May 22 at Over the Limit, WWE received criticism for the video. To avoid legal complications with the U.S. government, WWE added a disclaimer at the start of the video for future airings. This included spelling out their acronym as "World Wrestling Entertainment", a name they ceased using earlier in the year, in which "WWE" became an orphaned initialism.

The parody of a White House Presidential press conference is intended to publicize WWE's (World Wrestling Entertainment) pay-per-view television event known as Capitol Punishment, which emanates from our Nation's Capital on Sunday, June 19.

— WWE, Disclaimer for WWE Capitol Punishment promotional video

The promotional poster for the event also featured the President, where Obama is acting as a referee in a confrontation between WWE wrestlers John Cena and Rey Mysterio. WWE released a similar disclaimer for the artwork as they did for the video. The event featured an appearance by Barack Obama impersonator Reggie Brown.

=== Storylines ===
The professional wrestling matches at Capitol Punishment featured professional wrestlers performing as characters in scripted events pre-determined by the hosting promotion, WWE. Storylines between the characters were produced on WWE's weekly television shows Raw and SmackDown with the Raw and SmackDown brands—storyline divisions in which WWE assigned its employees to different programs.

Raw's main feud was between John Cena and R-Truth for the WWE Championship. The crazed R-Truth started to set his sights on the WWE Championship and John Cena. R-Truth had been scheduled to compete against The Miz and John Cena in a steel cage match at Extreme Rules for the WWE Championship. John Morrison questioned R-Truth's ability to compete in the match and challenged him to a match for his spot. Morrison won the match, causing R-Truth to turn heel by attacking Morrison. R-Truth would cost Morrison the match at Extreme Rules. R-Truth claimed that there was a conspiracy against him in WWE and announced that he was done entertaining the fans as it did not earn him titles. He repeatedly ranted about Cena's popularity and even harassed a young Cena fan and his father by throwing water in the father's face after defeating Cena in a non-title match by countout. The anonymous Raw general manager announced a championship match between him and Cena at Capitol Punishment on the condition that R-Truth apologize for his actions. On the June 6 episode of Raw, R-Truth apologized for his actions and retained his title shot against John Cena.

SmackDown's main feud on the card was between Christian and Randy Orton over the World Heavyweight Championship. After losing his rematch against Orton at Over the Limit, Christian challenged Orton to another match for the World Heavyweight Championship on the following episode of SmackDown, but was interrupted by Mark Henry and Sheamus. SmackDown General Manager Teddy Long then announced a triple threat number one contender's match between Christian, Henry, and Sheamus, with the winner facing Orton for the title the next week. Sheamus won the match after the referee missed Christian's pinfall on Sheamus due to Orton's interference. The following week, Christian asked to be added to the title match that night, but Long instead made him the special guest referee. Christian would help Orton retain the championship, but struck him with the title belt afterwards, turning heel for the second time since 2005. The next week, Christian again challenged Orton to a World Heavyweight Championship match at Capitol Punishment, which Orton accepted. Later that night, Sheamus defeated Orton in a non-title No Disqualification match after Christian interfered and hit Orton with the title belt again. On the June 17 episode of SmackDown, Sheamus faced Christian with the stipulation that he would be added to the championship match at Capitol Punishment if he won, but Christian ended up winning. After the match, Orton, who was at ringside, attempted to attack Christian, but he escaped; instead, Orton punted Sheamus in the head, sending a message to Christian.

Evan Bourne and Jack Swagger had a mini-feud leading up to Capitol Punishment. Bourne and Swagger exchanged a series of wins and losses.

But a more important feud on the card was between CM Punk and Rey Mysterio. Punk and Mysterio similarly exchanged a series of wins and losses like Evan Bourne and Jack Swagger did, but Punk and Mysterio were reigniting a feud dating back to WrestleMania XXVI. Punk enlisted the aid of The New Nexus to help him win against Rey Mysterio, but The Anonymous Raw General Manager announced they will be banned from ringside at the pay-per-view.

Ezekiel Jackson started to grow apart from The Corre, and wanted to pursue a singles career away from the group. Wade Barrett, Heath Slater, and Justin Gabriel didn't take kindly to Jackson's new aspirations, and promptly beat him down backstage, thus ousting him from the group. Jackson was given multiple opportunities at Barrett's Intercontinental Championship, but each time he got Barrett in the Torture Rack, his signature submission maneuver, Slater and Gabriel would interfere and attack Jackson. This would make Jackson win the match by disqualification, but Barrett retained as titles can't change hands by disqualification. During a six-man tag team match against The Usos and Jackson on SmackDown, Barrett abandoned Slater and Gabriel. He claimed that he was preserving his own interests since he had a title match at Capitol Punishment against Jackson, but Gabriel and Slater were angered by his actions. Gabriel and Slater then announced to Barrett that The Corre was no more and he could defend his title on Sunday without their help, effectively dissolving the group.

On the May 23 episode of Raw, Big Show sat on Alberto Del Rio's luxury car, which angered Del Rio. When Big Show and his partner Kane lost their WWE Tag Team Championships to The New Nexus (David Otunga and Michael McGillicutty), Del Rio mocked them backstage during an interview segment. Del Rio even slapped Big Show across the face, resulting in Big Show chasing Del Rio into the parking lot, but Del Rio's personal ring announcer Ricardo Rodriguez "accidentally" ran Big Show over with Del Rio's car. This injured Big Show's leg and left Kane without a partner. Del Rio and Rodriguez then made fun of Big Show by having Rodriguez dress like him, mocking Big Show's weight. On the June 13 episode of Raw, Big Show returned during Del Rio's match with Kane and assaulted him, but Del Rio managed to escape after Rodriguez attempted to save him, resulting in Big Show beating Rodriguez so badly that Kane had to pull him off Rodriguez. After that, guest host Stone Cold Steve Austin announced a match between Big Show and Del Rio at Capitol Punishment. On the June 17 episode of SmackDown, Del Rio made an appearance, but Big Show ran down to the ring and chased Del Rio into the crowd. The segment ended with Big Show destroying the ringside area.

Another feud on the card was between The Miz and his former protégé Alex Riley. At Extreme Rules, Riley was not present when The Miz lost the WWE Championship to John Cena. The next night on Raw, Miz regained the championship from Cena after hitting him with the title belt; however, Riley accidentally revealed the title belt in Miz's hands to the referee. The referee then reversed his decision to Miz being disqualified and Cena retaining the championship. At Over the Limit, during The Miz's "I Quit" match with Cena, Riley left his cell phone behind which they had used to trick the referee into believing that Cena had said "I quit". The decision was reversed again and Miz went on to lose the encounter. On the May 23 episode of Raw, after the anonymous Raw general manager denied Miz's request for another WWE Championship match, he blamed Riley for him not regaining the title and fired him. Riley then assaulted Miz, turning face for the first time. The next week, Riley's interview with Michael Cole ended with Cole insulting Riley and Riley attacking Cole. Miz then came out and attacked Riley, but he got the upper hand and chased Miz out of the arena. A match between the two was then made official for Capitol Punishment.

The United States Championship was also defended at the event, with Dolph Ziggler challenging champion Kofi Kingston. On the May 30 episode of Raw, Ziggler defeated Kingston in a non-title match, thus earning a championship match at the pay-per view.

== Event ==
Other on-screen personnel
Role:	Name:
English commentators	Michael Cole
English commentators	Jerry Lawler
English commentators	Booker T
Spanish commentators	Marcelo Rodríguez
Spanish commentators	Hugo Savinovich
Backstage interviewer	Josh Mathews
Backstage interviewer	Matt Striker
Ring announcers	Tony Chimel
Ring announcers	Justin Roberts
Referees	Mike Chioda
Referees	Charles Robinson
Referees	Jack Doan
Referees	Chad Patton
Referees	Scott Armstrong

=== Preliminary matches ===
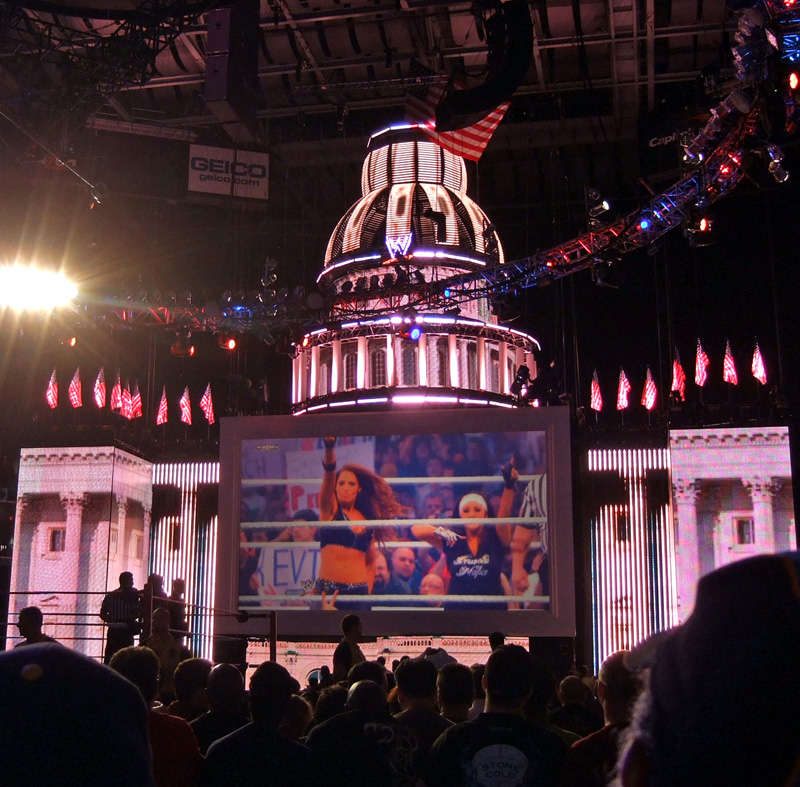
The set for Capitol Punishment

The actual pay-per-view opened with Kofi Kingston defending the WWE United States Championship against Dolph Ziggler (accompanied by Vickie Guerrero). The match ended when Ziggler applied a sleeper hold on Kingston, who passed out. Ziggler won the match by technical submission and the title.

Next, The Miz faced Alex Riley. Riley performed a lifting DDT on Miz to win the match.

After that, Big Show faced Alberto Del Rio. Before the match, Mark Henry attacked Big Show and delivered a World's Strongest Slam through a broadcast table. Del Rio won the match by technical knockout after Big Show could not continue.

In the fourth match, Wade Barrett defended the WWE Intercontinental Championship against Ezekiel Jackson. Jackson forced Barrett to submit to the Torture Rack to win the title.

In the fifth match, CM Punk faced Rey Mysterio. The stipulation of the match was that The New Nexus was banned from ringside. In the end, as Punk attempted to perform a GTS on Mysterio, Mysterio countered and attempted to perform a 619 on Punk, however, Punk countered and performed a GTS on Mysterio to win the match.

In the sixth match, Randy Orton defended the World Heavyweight Championship against Christian. During the match, Orton attempted an RKO on Christian, but Christian countered the move and performed a falling inverted DDT on Orton for a near-fall. Christian performed a spear on Orton for a near-fall. The match ended when Orton performed an RKO on Christian to retain the title, despite Christian's foot being under the bottom rope (which the referee did not see).

In the penultimate match and also an impromptu match, Jack Swagger faced Evan Bourne. In the end, Swagger applied an ankle lock on Bourne only for Bourne to counter and pin Swagger with an inside cradle to win the match.

=== Main event ===
The main event was for the WWE Championship between defending champion John Cena and R-Truth. During the match, Cena applied the STF on R-Truth only for R-Truth to touch the bottom rope to void the submission. R-Truth then performed a scissors kick on Cena for a near-fall. As Cena attempted to perform an Attitude Adjustment on R-Truth, R-Truth countered and performed a Shut Up on Cena for a near-fall. In the climax, R-Truth stole a hat and a drink from a young fan in the crowd. When R-Truth handed the drink back to the fan, the fan threw the drink on R-Truth's face. Cena then threw a distracted R-Truth back into the ring and performed an Attitude Adjustment on him to retain the title. After the match, Cena celebrated with the young fan in the ring.

== Aftermath ==
=== Raw ===
While the feud between John Cena and R-Truth would boil down, R-Truth along with The Miz would then assault Cena, Alberto Del Rio, and CM Punk inside a steel cage following their triple threat match at Hell in a Cell in October. The two men would never cross paths until 14 years later when Cena, who then became an aggressive villain, defeated R-Truth at Saturday Night's Main Event XXXIX.

=== SmackDown ===
On the following episode of SmackDown, Christian demanded another match for Randy Orton's World Heavyweight Championship, and SmackDown General Manager Theodore Long granted the match if Christian could defeat Kane. Christian lost via disqualification after interference from Mark Henry. A tag team match pitting Christian and Henry against Kane and Orton then took place, where Henry pinned Orton to win the match. The following week, Henry lost to Orton via countout after interference from Christian. As a result, Christian was scheduled to face Orton for the World Heavyweight Championship at Money in the Bank. It was also stipulated that if Orton were to get disqualified or if there was poor officiating, Christian would win the title.

=== Future ===
Capitol Punishment would be a one-off event for WWE. In 2012, it was replaced by the reinstated No Way Out.

== Results ==
No.	Results	Stipulations	Times
1^{D}	Santino Marella and Vladimir Kozlov defeated Heath Slater and Justin Gabriel	Tag team match	—
2	Dolph Ziggler (with Vickie Guerrero) defeated Kofi Kingston (c) by technical submission	Singles match for the WWE United States Championship	11:06
3	Alex Riley defeated The Miz by pinfall	Singles match	10:13
4	Alberto Del Rio defeated Big Show by pinfall	Singles match	04:57
5	Ezekiel Jackson defeated Wade Barrett (c) by pinfall	Singles match for the WWE Intercontinental Championship	06:36
6	CM Punk defeated Rey Mysterio by pinfall	Singles match The New Nexus were banned from ringside.	15:00
7	Randy Orton (c) defeated Christian by pinfall	Singles match for the World Heavyweight Championship	14:06
8	Evan Bourne defeated Jack Swagger by pinfall	Singles match	07:12
9	John Cena (c) defeated R-Truth by pinfall	Singles match for the WWE Championship	14:45
(c) / – the champion(s) heading into the match; D / – this was a dark match
