= Ezekiel Jackson =

Guyanese-American wrestler and bodybuilder

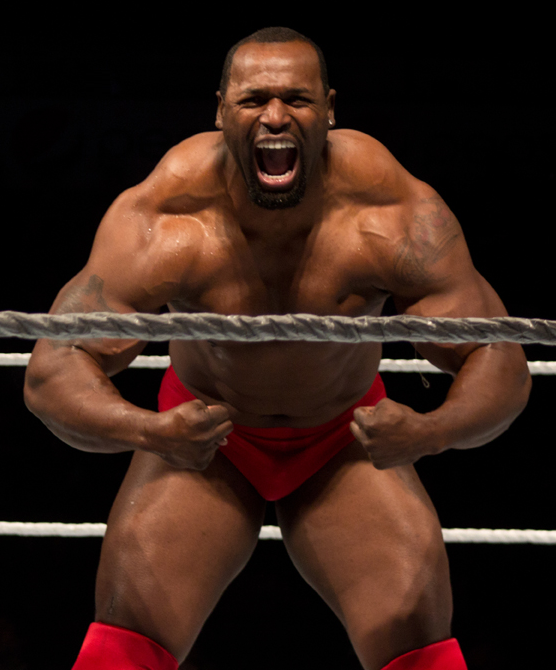
- Jackson in 2012

Personal information
- Born: Rycklon Edward Stephens; April 22, 1978 (age 48) Linden, Guyana
- Education: University at Buffalo
- Spouse: Jenn Stephens (m. 2004)
- Children: 2
- Website: rycklon.com

Professional wrestling career
- Ring name(s): Big Ryck; Ezekiel Jackson; Rycklon; Rycklon Stephens
- Billed height: 6 ft 3 in (191 cm)
- Billed weight: 280 lb (127 kg)
- Billed from: Harlem, New York; Guyana, South America; South Central, Los Angeles, California
- Trained by: Homicide; Tom Prichard; Steve Keirn; Rick Bassman
- Debut: January 27, 2007

Rycklon Edward Stephens (born April 22, 1978) is a Guyanese-American professional wrestler. He is best known for his tenure in WWE from 2007 to 2014 where he performed under the ring name Ezekiel Jackson, where he was the final ECW Champion under WWE's ECW brand, as well as a former WWE Intercontinental Champion.

Stephens made his professional wrestling debut for the California-based promotion Ultimate Pro Wrestling in 2007 under the ring name Big Ryck Hytz. He was then signed by WWE in 2007 and sent to their then-developmental territory, Florida Championship Wrestling, under the new ring name Rycklon, which was later changed to Ezekiel Jackson after his main-roster debut in 2008. During his time in WWE, Jackson was the final man to win the ECW Championship, his only professional wrestling world championship, making him the third African American to hold the ECW championship, the sixth black world champion (after The Rock, Booker T, Bobby Lashley, Ron Simmons, and Mark Henry), and the first South American -born champion in WWE history. He later joined The Corre but was kicked out, thus starting a feud with the stable's leader Wade Barrett and he would go on to win the WWE Intercontinental Championship once.

Jackson would leave WWE in 2014 and briefly wrestle for Total Nonstop Action Wrestling (TNA) later that year. He also competed in one season of Lucha Underground from 2014 to 2015 as Big Ryck. He retired from fulltime wrestling in 2015 and is the owner of the Redwood City, California-based professional wrestling promotion and school Bryckhouse Pro Wrestling.

== Early life ==
Rycklon Edward Stephens was born on April 22, 1978 in Linden, Guyana. At a young age, he immigrated to the United States. He graduated from John Dewey High School in Brooklyn, New York. Stephens attended the University at Buffalo.

== Professional wrestling career ==
=== World Wrestling Entertainment/WWE (2007–2014) ===
==== Florida Championship Wrestling (2007–2008) ====
Stephens signed a developmental contract with World Wrestling Entertainment in March 2007 and debuted in Florida Championship Wrestling (FCW) in late June. In his debut match on June 27, he teamed with Keith Walker to defeat Kofi Kingston and Eric Pérez. He continued to compete in the promotion in both tag team and singles matches. On February 8, 2008, he competed in a match with tag partner Bryan Kelly in a losing effort against Steve Lewington and Heath Miller in a mini-tournament to face the WWE Tag Team Champions John Morrison and The Miz. On May 6, 2008, Stephens wrestled his final match in FCW before being called up to WWE's main roster.

==== The Brian Kendrick's bodyguard (2008–2009) ====
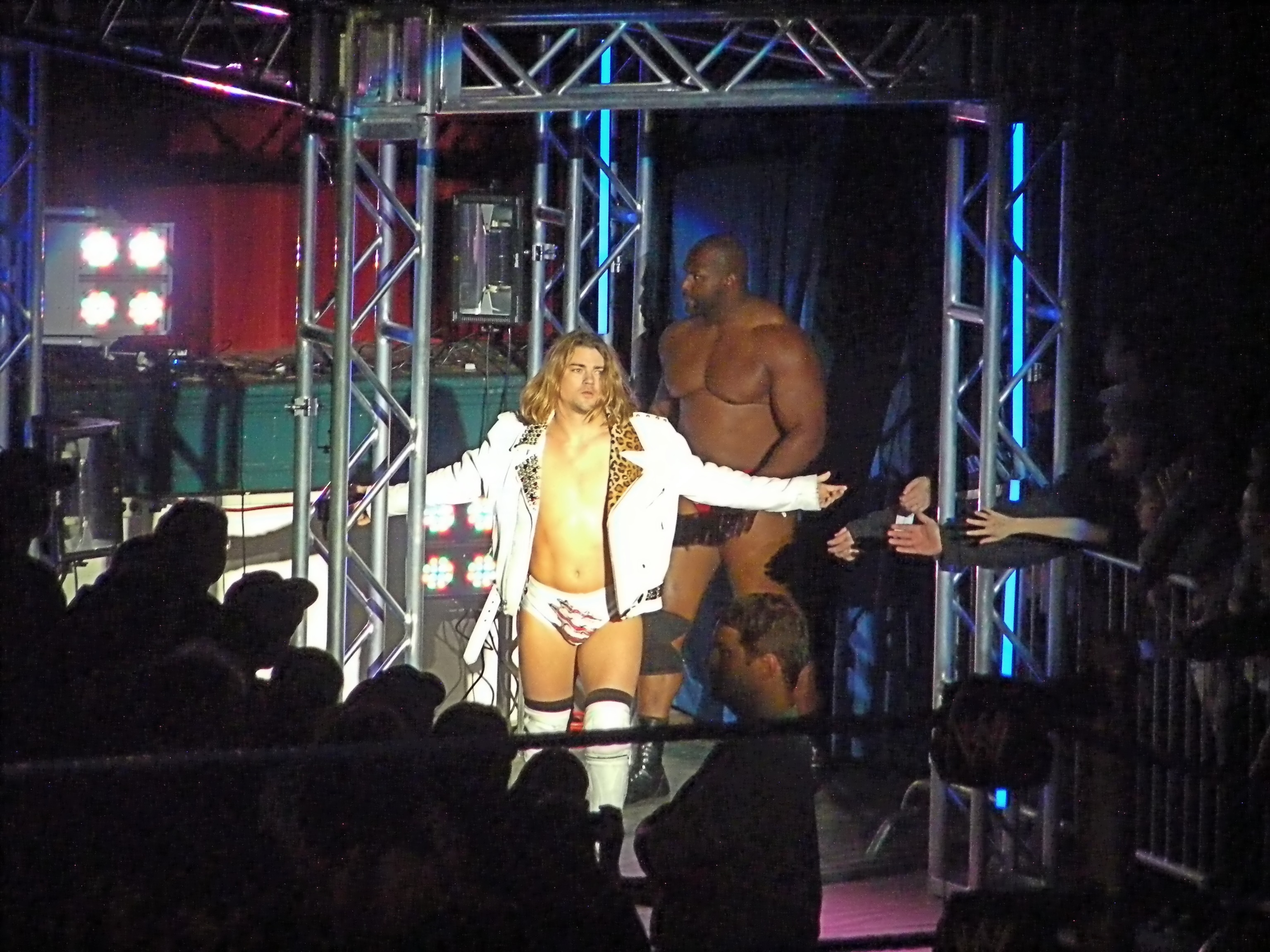
Jackson with The Brian Kendrick in 2009

After being trained in FCW, Stephens debuted on the July 18, 2008, episode of SmackDown under the name Ezekiel, as The Brian Kendrick's bodyguard. On the August 8, 2008, edition of SmackDown, his ring name was tweaked to Ezekiel Jackson, and he was revealed as being Kendrick's "advisor". He then began interfering in Kendrick's matches against Jeff Hardy, Finlay, and WWE Champion Triple H. On the October 17 episode of SmackDown, Jackson made his official in-ring debut by quickly defeating Super Crazy, after replacing a supposedly sick Kendrick. In late 2008, Jackson began teaming with Kendrick and both began feuding with the WWE Tag Team Champions The Colóns (Carlito and Primo), although Kendrick and Jackson failed to win the championship. He suffered his first defeat on the February 13, 2009, episode of SmackDown, when he lost a singles match to R-Truth. Jackson made his final appearance on the SmackDown brand in a losing effort against Jeff Hardy on the April 3, 2009, episode.

==== The Ruthless Roundtable and ECW Champion (2009–2010) ====
On April 15, 2009, Jackson was drafted to the ECW brand as part of the 2009 Supplemental Draft, therefore breaking up the team of himself and Kendrick. He made his ECW debut defeating Jack Meridol on the July 9, 2009, episode. Jackson then began an angle with Vladimir Kozlov in which, week after week, after one of them had squashed a local competitor, the other would come out and hit their finishing move on the fallen opponent in a game of one-upmanship. On the August 18 episode of ECW, Jackson formed an alliance with Kozlov and William Regal after betraying the ECW Champion, Christian, during a tag team match to side with them, and attacking Christian at Regal's request. Kozlov and Jackson aided Regal in his feud with Christian over the ECW Championship, but Regal was unable to capture the title.

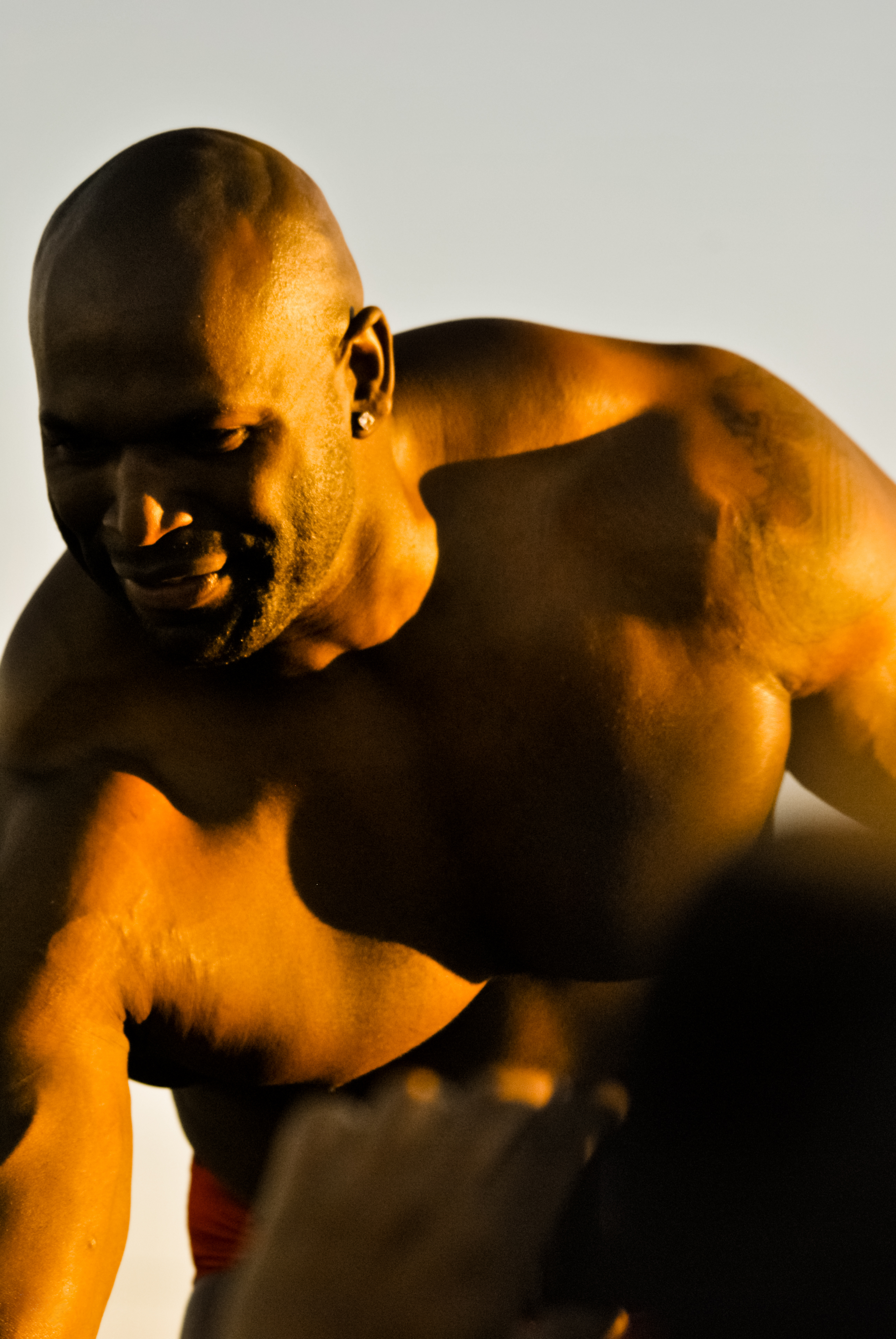
Jackson at the 2010 Tribute to the Troops show

On the November 24 episode of ECW, Jackson attacked both Regal and Kozlov after Kozlov accused Jackson of costing Regal a match. The following week, Jackson once again betrayed Kozlov and Regal by walking out on Kozlov during a tag team match against Christian and Shelton Benjamin. Jackson, however, realigned himself with Regal, when he was aided by Regal in defeating Kozlov on an episode of ECW. On the January 12, 2010, episode of ECW, Jackson won the ECW Homecoming battle royal to earn a match for the ECW Championship. He faced Christian for the ECW championship at the Royal Rumble pay-per-view but was unsuccessful. On the final episode of ECW on February 16, Jackson defeated Christian to win the ECW Championship in an Extreme Rules match. Upon winning the title, WWE credits Jackson as the final ECW Champion.

==== The Corre and Intercontinental Champion (2010–2011) ====
On the February 19 episode of SmackDown, a video package aired, promoting Jackson's return to the brand. He made his return on the March 5 episode of SmackDown without Regal, who instead joined Raw, and defeated Jimmy Wang Yang. On April 10, 2010, at a house show in Glasgow, Scotland, Jackson suffered a tear in his right quadriceps muscle during a match against Kane, and was expected to be inactive for approximately six months. During his injury, Jackson was drafted to the Raw brand as part of the 2010 WWE Supplemental Draft.

Jackson made his return to the ring on September 14, 2010, defeating Zack Ryder in a dark match prior to the Raw tapings. He returned to television on the October 18 episode of Raw, where he was revealed as a member of Team Raw for the Bragging Rights pay-per-view. At Bragging Rights, Jackson was one of the final two remaining members of Team Raw, but they lost to Team SmackDown. On the November 22 episode of Raw, Jackson qualified for the 2010 edition of the King of the Ring tournament by defeating Alex Riley, who replaced Jackson's original opponent The Miz. He faced Drew McIntyre in the quarter-finals, but the match ended in a double countout, so neither advanced.

In December 2010, Jackson was traded back to the SmackDown brand. On the January 11, 2011, taping of the January 14 edition of SmackDown, Jackson joined Wade Barrett, Justin Gabriel and Heath Slater in assaulting The Big Show, appearing to form an alliance with the three. The following week the group was named The Corre. On the May 6 episode of SmackDown, Jackson defeated Big Show in a singles match, but refused to celebrate with the other members of The Corre afterward. Backstage, the other members of The Corre attacked him in retaliation, turning Jackson face. Jackson went on to face Barrett for the Intercontinental Championship at Over the Limit, and won by disqualification, which meant that Barrett retained the championship. Jackson continued to feud with the other members of The Corre, winning against Barrett by disqualification and countout respectively.

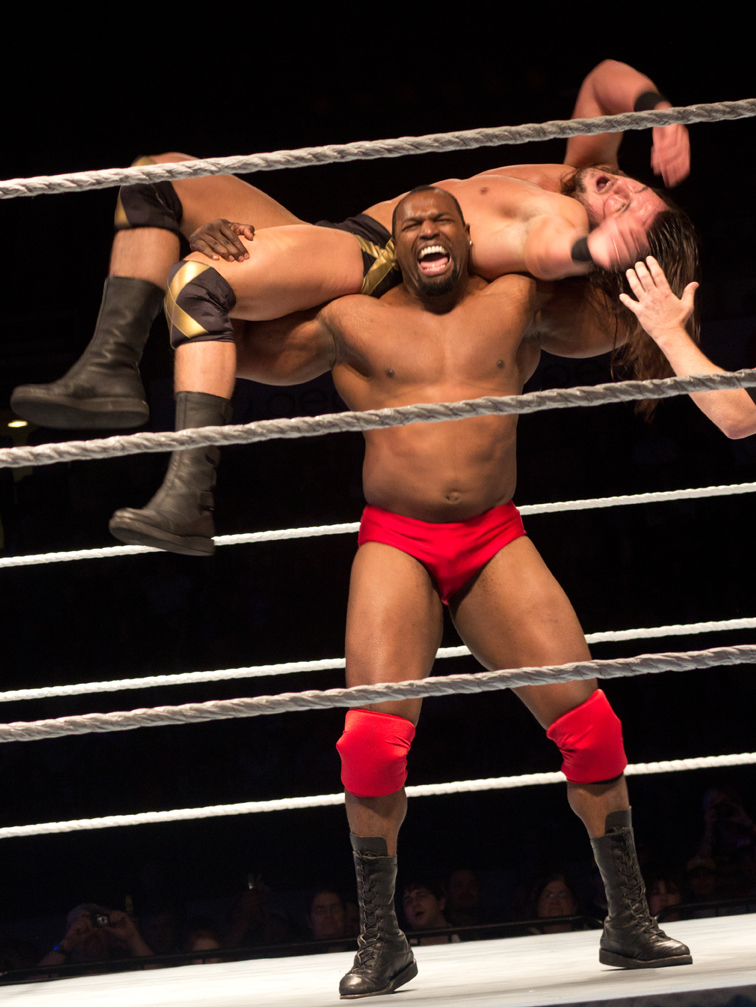
Jackson performing a backbreaker rack on Drew McIntyre

On June 19, at the Capitol Punishment pay-per-view, Jackson defeated Barrett to win the Intercontinental Championship for the first time. Jackson successfully retained the championship in a rematch against Barrett on the following episode of SmackDown and also successfully defended it against Ted DiBiase on the July 15 episode. On August 12 episode of SmackDown, Jackson lost the Intercontinental Championship to Cody Rhodes, ending his Intercontinental Championship reign at 51 days. He went on to feud with both Rhodes and DiBiase. On the August 19 episode of SmackDown, he lost a rematch for the championship to Rhodes. Jackson was part of a ten-man battle royal for the Intercontinental Championship, but was eliminated by Rhodes.

==== Final feuds and departure (2012–2014) ====
On January 29, 2012, at the Royal Rumble pay-per-view, Jackson entered the Royal Rumble match as the thirteenth entrant, but he was eliminated by the returning Great Khali. Jackson started a losing streak losing to the likes of Jinder Mahal, Drew McIntyre, and David Otunga. Jackson finally ended his losing streak by teaming with The Great Khali to defeat the team of Curt Hawkins and Tyler Reks on the May 16 episode of NXT. However, he lost to the Big Show on the May 26 episode and May 27 episode of Smackdown.

Around mid–2012, Jackson suffered an upper body injury and was inactive for many months. After almost a year of inactivity due to his injury, Jackson returned at a live event for WrestleMania Axxess on April 4, 2013, by teaming up with Yoshi Tatsu to defeat the team of Hunico and Camacho. On January 4, 2014, Jackson announced he was undergoing another surgery. As a result of this, on April 6, 2014, Jackson reported that he had officially parted ways with WWE.

=== Total Nonstop Action Wrestling (2014) ===
He made his debut, along with Gene Snitsky, in Total Nonstop Action Wrestling (TNA) on the June 25 taping of Impact Wrestling (which aired on July 24) using the ringname Rycklon as a heel; attacking Tommy Dreamer, Bully Ray and Devon, and aligning himself with Dixie Carter. It also marked the very first time that the final champion of the original and the new ECW were in the ring at exactly the same time (Rhino and Rycklon) Rycklon and Snitsky were fired by Dixie Carter on the August 7 edition of Impact Wrestling. Earlier on the show they had competed in an Eight-Man Hardcore War between Team EC3 (EC3, Rhino, Rycklon and Snitsky) in a losing effort against Team Bully (Bully Ray, Devon, Tommy Dreamer and Al Snow).

=== Lucha Underground (2014–2015) ===
In September 2014, Stephens worked at Lucha Underground under the ring name Big Ryck, where he was forming a heel trio named The Crenshaw Crew with Cisco, Bael and Cortez Castro. Ryck feuded with Johnny Mundo and Prince Puma. Their feud concluded in a three-way ladder match, which was won by Mundo. On the October 5, 2014, taping, Ryck participated in an Aztec Warfare Battle Royal to crown the first Lucha Underground Champion but was eliminated. On January 21, 2015, Cisco, Castro and Bael attacked Ryck and burned his eye with a cigar, turning face in the process. Ryck returned to action on February 25, 2015, distracting The Crew in a match against Sexy Star, Mascarita Sagrada, and Pimpinela Escarlata. On March 4, 2015, Ryck defeated Star to earn a match against The Crew. Ryck defeated The Crew in a one-on-three handicap match. On February 8, 2015, Ryck, along with Killshot and Willie Mack participated in a tournament for the Lucha Underground Trios Championship, but they were defeated in the finals by the eventual winners Angélico, Son of Havoc and Ivelisse. After their loss, Ryck left Mack and Killshot and was hired by DelAvar Daivari, attacking Texano on May 20, 2015, turning heel in the process. At Ultima Lucha, Daivari ran out and distracted Ryck by firing him, hinting at a face turn. However, nothing came of this due to Stephens departing Lucha Underground in 2015 due to traveling conflicts. It was revealed that Big Ryck was one of five missing people on the April 20 episode of Lucha Underground. In the four-issue miniseries following that, it explaining what had happened after Ultima Lucha and before season two. It was revealed that Ryck was "killed" by The Disciples of Death, officially writing his character off the show.

=== Independent circuit (2015, 2025–present) ===
On October 17, 2015, Stephens, as Big Ryck, made his debut for the German Westside Xtreme Wrestling (wXw) promotion, unsuccessfully challenging Karsten Beck for the wXw Unified World Wrestling Championship. After this, he retired from wrestling full-time to become a personal trainer. Stephens however maintained that he was not officially retired from wrestling and had not wrestled his last match.

Stephens would make his in-ring return in March 2025, nearly 10 years after his last match. He competed in a triple threat match at FWE Full Throttle against Psycho Boy Fodder and Sylvain for the FWE Heavyweight Championship, and was unsuccessful in winning the championship. Stephens and Too Fresh (Alpha Zo and D-Dre Fresh) defeated Los Nuevos Gringos Locos (Jason Styles, Julio Pedroza and Rockero del Diablo) at SOW Clash in Alameda on May 31.

== Personal life ==
Stephens has been married to his wife Jenn Stephens since 2004, and the couple had two children. Stephens is a devout Christian. His son, R.J. Stephens, plays as a defensive lineman for UC Berkeley.

== Other media ==
=== Video games ===
Video game appearances
Year	Title	Notes
2009	WWE SmackDown vs. Raw 2010	Video game debut
2010	WWE SmackDown vs. Raw 2011	
2011	WWE '12	

== Championships and accomplishments ==
- Pro Wrestling Illustrated
  - PWI ranked him No. 78 of the top 500 singles wrestlers in the PWI 500 in 2011
- World Wrestling Entertainment/WWE
  - ECW Championship (1 time, final)
  - WWE Intercontinental Championship (1 time)
  - ECW Homecoming Tournament (2010)
