= Heath Slater =

American professional wrestler and actor (born 1983)

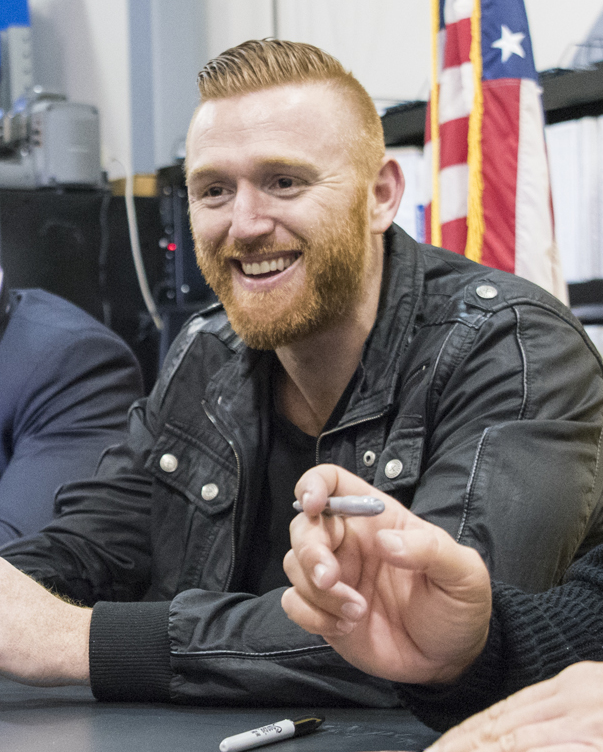
- Slater in 2016

Personal information
- Born: Heath Wallace Miller; July 15, 1983 (age 43) Pineville, West Virginia, U.S.
- Spouse: Stephanie Jean (m. 2011)
- Children: 3

Professional wrestling career
- Ring name(s): Heath; Heath Miller; Heath Slater; Heath Wallace Miller Esq. Sebastian Slater; Fake Sting
- Billed height: 6 ft 2 in (188 cm)
- Billed weight: 216 lb (98 kg)
- Billed from: Pineville, West Virginia
- Trained by: Curtis Hughes
- Debut: 2004

Heath Wallace Miller (born July 15, 1983) is an American professional wrestler. He is best known for his tenure in WWE from 2006 to 2020 under the ring name Heath Slater. He also performed in Impact Wrestling, under the mononymous name Heath.

After debuting in 2004, Miller signed to WWE in 2006 and competed in its developmental territories Deep South Wrestling (DSW) and Florida Championship Wrestling (FCW) before appearing on the first season of NXT in 2010. He debuted on WWE's main roster later that year as a member of The Nexus, becoming a three-time WWE Tag Team Champion with fellow Nexus member Justin Gabriel in the process. In 2016, he began a storyline which saw him form a tag team with Rhyno, leading the two to become the inaugural WWE SmackDown Tag Team Champions. He is the first wrestler to have won both the SmackDown and Raw Tag Team Championships. (Note: The Raw Tag Team Championships were still known as the WWE Tag Team Championships at the time of Slater's win.) He was released from WWE in April 2020, ending a 14-year tenure with the company.

Miller signed with Impact Wrestling later that year. He would reunite with former tag team partner Rhino and win the Impact World Tag Team Championship in 2022. Overall, Miller is a five-time tag team champion between WWE and Impact.

== Early life ==
Heath Wallace Miller was born in Pineville, West Virginia, on July 15, 1983. as an only child he was raised by his mother Dee Wallace Taylor, stepfather and grandparents. Growing up Miller was a multi sport athlete, he attended Wyoming East High School from 1999-2002. During his time there he played basketball, football and baseball and help the teams win multiple state championships. Miller received a basketball scholarship to Potomac State College where played for one season before deciding to move back home and attend a local community college. However before officially signing up for classes Miller instead decided to pursue a career in pro wrestling, so he and three of his friends moved to Atlanta, Georgia to begin training.

== Professional wrestling career ==
=== World Wrestling Alliance (2004–2006) ===
Miller was trained by Curtis Hughes at the wrestling school of World Wrestling Alliance (WWA4). He made his debut in 2004, wrestling for WWA4 and other Georgia-based wrestling promotions.

=== World Wrestling Entertainment / WWE (2006–2020) ===
==== Developmental territories (2006–2010) ====
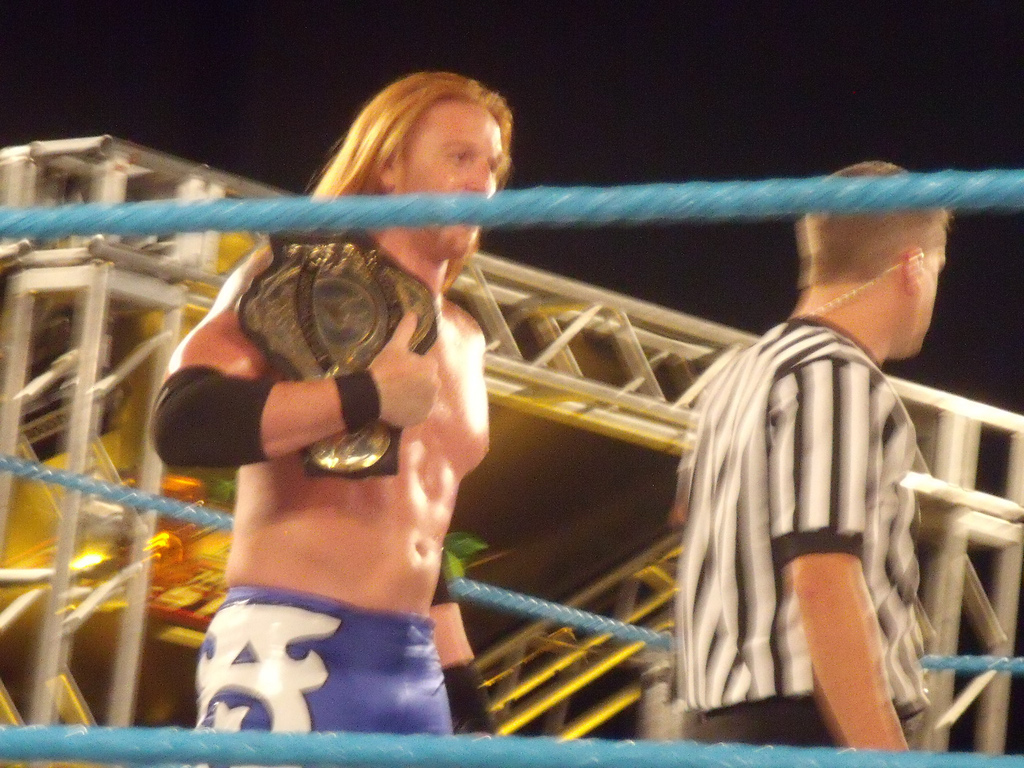
Miller as the FCW Florida Heavyweight Champion in 2009

In December 2006, Miller signed a developmental contract with WWE and was assigned to Deep South Wrestling (DSW), a WWE developmental territory. When the WWE ended its relationship with DSW in the spring of 2007, Miller was one of over twenty developmental wrestlers to be sent for further training at the new Florida Championship Wrestling (FCW) territory. At a June 2007 FCW show, Miller appeared as the manager of fellow developmental talent Shawn McGrath under the name Heath Wallace Miller Esq., but he reverted to using his real name and resumed his singles career while continuing to manage McGrath.

In 2007, Miller was given a talk show called 'The Happy Hour' during some FCW shows. During one segment, Billy Kidman was the guest; Miller claimed to idolize Kidman but then commented that Kidman's career was declining. This created a feud and led to a series of matches between the two. In January 2008, Miller started defending the FCW Southern Heavyweight Championship on behalf of the champion Ted DiBiase, Jr., who was injured. DiBiase soon forfeited the belt and Miller was declared the champion.

Miller and his tag team partner Steve Lewington lost to John Morrison and the Miz for the WWE Tag Team Championship on February 15, 2008, at an FCW show. Miller and Lewington then advanced to the finals of a tournament for the inaugural Florida Tag Team Championship in February 2008. Miller and Lewington defeated Brandon Groom and Greg Jackson and The Thoroughbreds (Johnny Curtis and Kevin Kiley) to reach the finals. On February 23, 2008, Miller and Lewington lost to The Puerto Rican Nightmares (Eddie Colón and Eric Perez) in the finals. On September 11, teaming with Joe Hennig, he won the FCW Florida Tag Team Championship. As champion, he changed his ring name to Sebastian Slater. On October 30, 2008, Slater and Hennig lost the title to The New Hart Foundation (Harry Smith and TJ Wilson) in Tampa, Florida. He later returned from injury and defeated Justin Angel. On August 13, 2009, at the 50th FCW TV taping, Miller defeated Tyler Reks to become FCW Heavyweight Champion. Slater lost the FCW Heavyweight Championship to Justin Gabriel in a two out of three falls match at the September 24, 2009, TV taping.

On February 16, 2010, Miller, now using the ring name Heath Slater, was one of eight FCW wrestlers to compete on the first season of the new NXT show, with Christian as his storyline mentor. On the inaugural episode of NXT, Slater debuted as a face as he and Christian defeated Carlito and Michael Tarver in a tag team match. Two weeks later, Slater defeated Carlito, becoming the first NXT rookie to defeat a WWE pro. On the March 30 episode of NXT, he came fourth out of eight rookies in the first Pros' Poll. On the April 6 episode, Slater won a keg-carrying contest against all other rookies. This resulted in him being in the main event that night, a match against Kane, which he lost. In an upset victory on April 20, Slater defeated Chris Jericho in the main event of NXT. However, Slater remained at fourth in the second Pros Poll, revealed on May 11. He was eliminated from NXT on May 25, coming in last in the Pros' Poll.

==== The Nexus and The Corre (2010–2011) ====
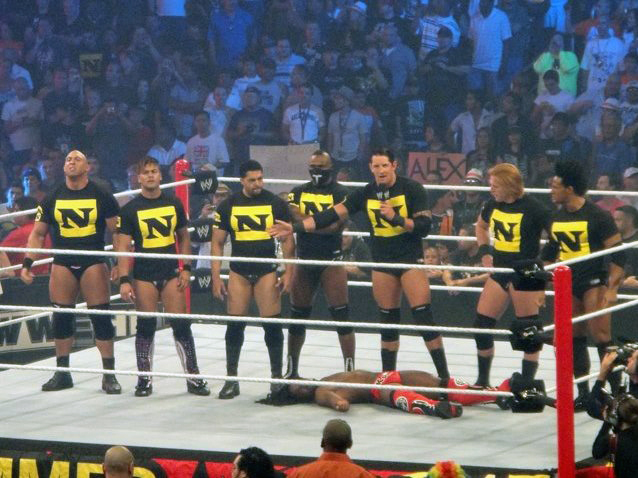
Slater (second from right) with the rest of The Nexus at SummerSlam

On the June 7 episode of Raw, Slater and the other season one NXT rookies established themselves as heels by interfering in the main event match between John Cena and CM Punk, attacking both competitors, Jerry Lawler and Justin Roberts before dismantling the ring area and surrounding equipment. On the June 14 episode of Raw, the rookies (sans Daniel Bryan, who had been released from his contract) attacked General Manager Bret Hart, when he refused to give them contracts. At the Fatal 4-Way pay-per-view, the seven rookies interfered in the WWE Championship match, and as a result costing Cena the championship to Sheamus. The following week on Raw, Vince McMahon fired Hart and installed the Anonymous General Manager, who signed the seven season one NXT rookies to contracts. The following week, the group was named The Nexus. On the July 12 episode of Raw, The Nexus competed in their first match together, without Darren Young, a six–on–one handicap match against John Cena, which they won when Gabriel pinned Cena. The Nexus continued to feud with Cena and the Raw roster, resulting in a seven-on-seven elimination tag team match at SummerSlam. Slater eliminated both Chris Jericho and Edge but was eliminated from the match by Daniel Bryan, with Team Cena winning the match.

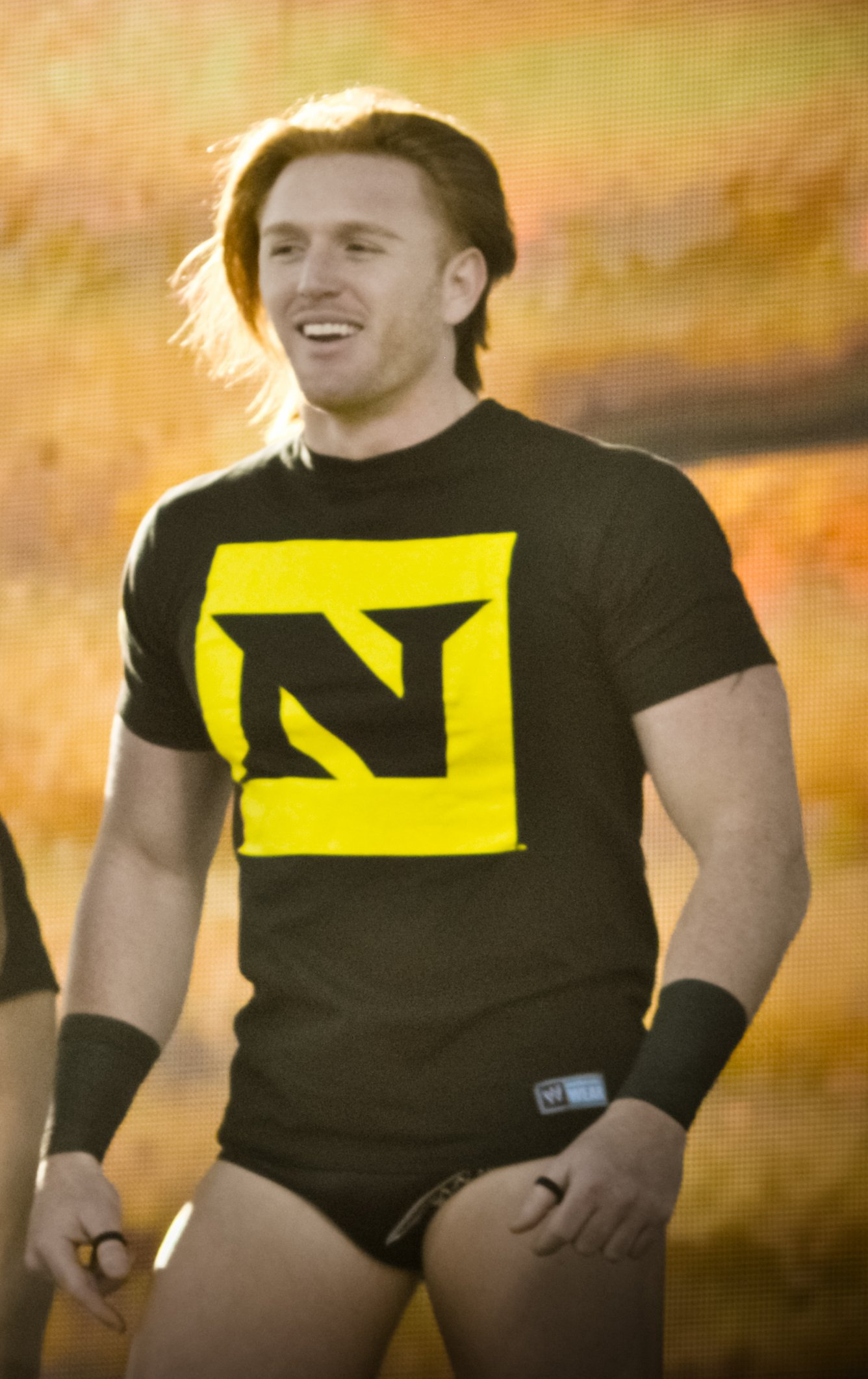
Slater at the 2010 Tribute to the Troops event

In October 2010, Cena was forced to join The Nexus as a result of losing to Barrett at Hell in a Cell and at Bragging Rights, Cena and David Otunga won the WWE Tag Team Championship. On the October 25 episode of Raw, Barrett made a tag team match, with Gabriel and Slater facing Otunga and Cena for the championship. Gabriel and Slater won when Barrett ordered Otunga to allow Slater to pin him, winning the title. Gabriel and Slater held the title for nearly two months, before losing it to Santino Marella and Vladimir Kozlov in a four-way elimination match also involving The Usos and Mark Henry and Yoshi Tatsu on the December 6 episode of Raw. Gabriel and Slater received a championship rematch at TLC: Tables, Ladders & Chairs but lost by disqualification when Nexus member Michael McGillicutty interfered. On the January 10, 2011, episode of Raw, Gabriel and Slater refused to take part in new Nexus leader CM Punk's initiation and walked away from the group.

The following day, at the January 11 taping of SmackDown, Gabriel and Slater helped their former leader Wade Barrett and Ezekiel Jackson attack Big Show. The following week, Gabriel, Slater, Barrett, and Jackson formed The Corre, and later that night Gabriel defeated World Heavyweight Champion Edge in a non-title match, following interference from the other members of The Corre. After winning a non-title match against the champions Kozlov and Marella on the February 4 episode of SmackDown, Gabriel and Slater received a match for the WWE Tag Team Championship two weeks later, but lost via disqualification when the other members of The Corre interfered. They received a rematch at the Elimination Chamber pay-per-view on February 20 and defeated Marella and Kozlov to win the WWE Tag Team Championship for the second time. The following night on Raw, Gabriel and Slater lost the championship to John Cena and The Miz, but won the championship back minutes later after Barrett invoked The Corre's rematch clause and The Miz quickly turned on Cena. The match ended with Slater pinning Cena. The Corre began a feud with Big Show and at WrestleMania XXVII, the team of Big Show, Kane, Santino Marella and Kofi Kingston defeated The Corre. At the April 19 taping of SmackDown, the duo of Gabriel and Slater lost the Tag Team Championship to the team of Kane and The Big Show. In a backstage segment following the match, Gabriel was attacked by Slater, who thought Gabriel blamed him for their loss. On the May 6, 2011, edition of SmackDown, Gabriel, Barrett and Slater attacked Jackson, removing him from the group. Barrett walked out on Gabriel and Slater in a 6-man tag team match against Jackson and The Usos on the June 10, 2011, edition of SmackDown, leading to Gabriel and Slater telling Barrett that The Corre was over. Slater and Gabriel then started a feud with The Usos. On the June 17, 2011, episode of SmackDown, Gabriel and Slater were defeated by The Usos, later defeating them in a rematch on the June 24, 2011, edition. The next day, he and Gabriel were added to the SmackDown Money in the Bank ladder match.

==== Feud with the Legends (2011–2012) ====
They were again defeated by The Usos on the July 8, 2011, episode of SmackDown, having a visible disagreement and argument in the ring following the match. On the July 15, 2011, episode of SmackDown, Slater started a feud with Gabriel when he verbally berated him saying that Gabriel was holding him down. That same night, Slater lost to Gabriel. At Money in the Bank on July 17, he and Gabriel participated in the SmackDown Money in the Bank ladder match, which was won by Daniel Bryan. On October 17, WWE suspended Slater due to a Wellness Violation for 30 days.

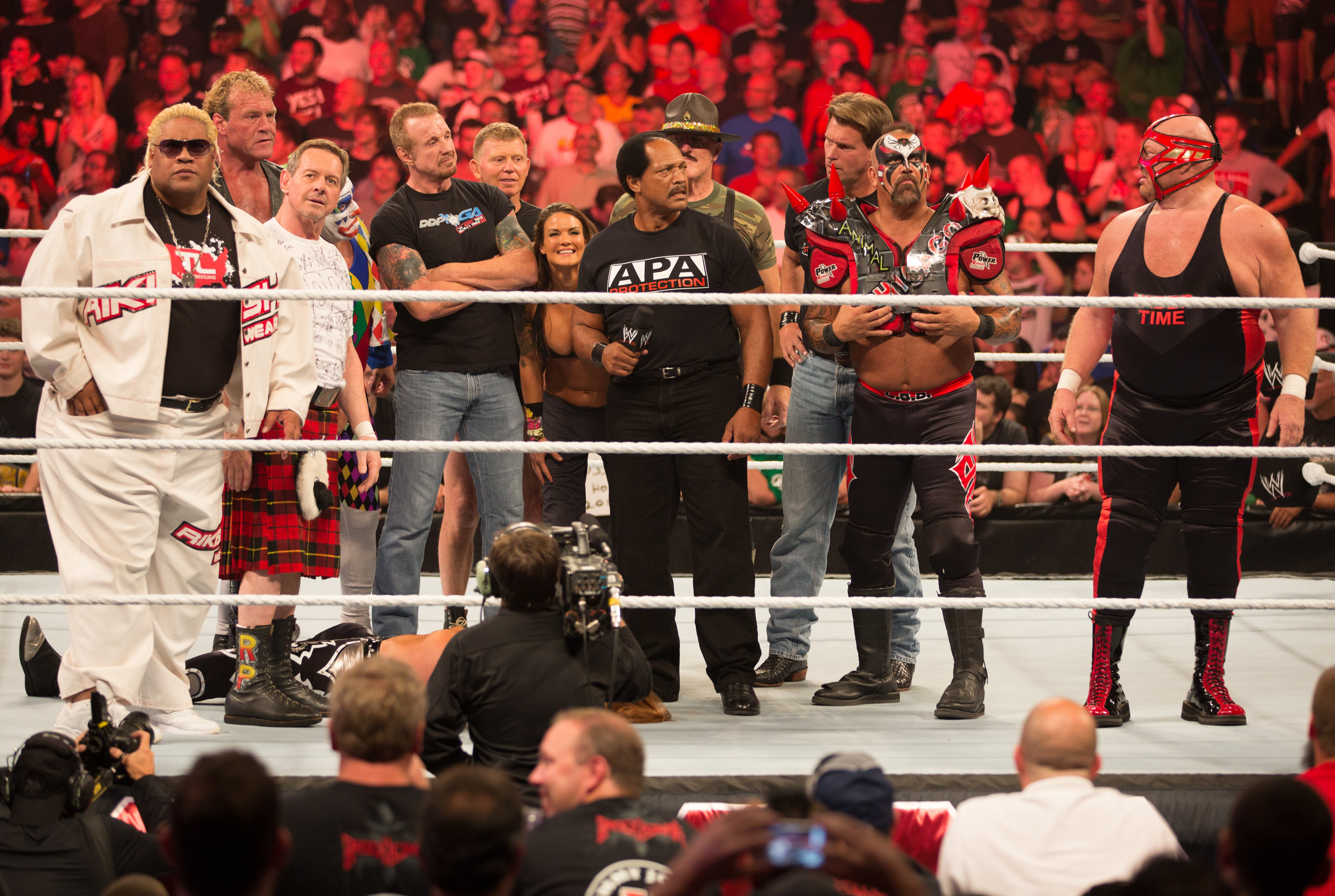
WWE's returning veterans celebrate over a vanquished Slater on Raw 1000

On the June 11, 2012, episode of Raw, Slater began appearing in segments involving WWE veterans returning to Raw as a build-up to Raw's 1000th episode on July 23. 2012. In the segments, Slater would enter the ring and issue challenges to "the so-called legends" or "any former WWE champion", which resulted in him losing a series of squash matches, with the first two losses to Vader and Sycho Sid. He was further humiliated in a comedic segment by Roddy Piper, Wendi Richter and Cyndi Lauper. He defeated Doink the Clown on the July 2, 2012, edition of Raw, but following the match, Diamond Dallas Page came to the ring and performed the Diamond Cutter on Slater. On the July 9, 2012, episode of Raw, after losing to Sin Cara, Slater berated the audience and issued a challenge "to any former champion" and guaranteed he would defeat him; Bob Backlund accepted the challenge. Shortly after Backlund entered, Slater hit him with a cheap shot. Backlund then applied the crossface chickenwing submission hold and kept it locked in long after Slater had tapped out. In following matches Scotty 2 Hotty, Rikishi and Road Warrior Animal all defeated Slater in further matches.

On July 23, 2012, during the 1000th episode of Raw, he demanded a "no disqualifications, no countout" match and guaranteed his own victory. Lita responded to the challenge, however before the match could begin, Lita said she had "hired herself a little protection", after which APA emerged. Slater attempted to leave; however, he was forced back to the ring by all of the legends who had humiliated Slater in the preceding weeks on Raw. Lita performed a twist of fate on Slater, followed by a clothesline from hell by Bradshaw. Lita then pinned Slater after performing a moonsault. As Slater lay prone in the ring, the legends celebrated while Faarooq taunted him with his catchphrase "Damn!".

==== 3MB (2012–2014) ====
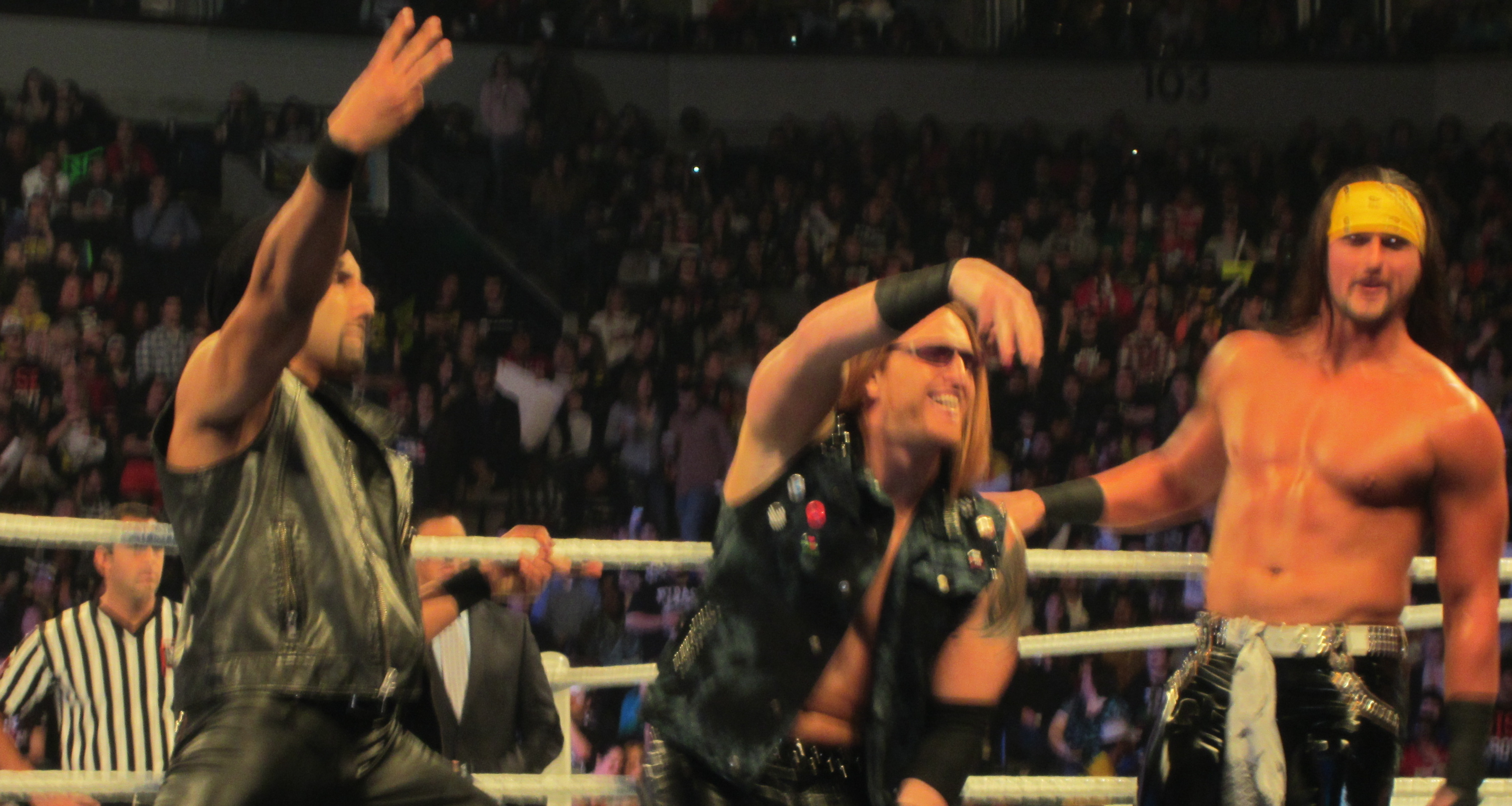
3MB in February 2013

On the September 21, 2012, episode of SmackDown, Drew McIntyre and Jinder Mahal interfered in Slater's match against Brodus Clay by attacking Clay. The trio later settled for the name of the Three Man Band, or 3MB for short. Slater would then go on to become the brash and confident leader of the 3MB. From October 2012, 3MB racked up many wins against Team Co-Bro (Santino Marella and Zack Ryder) and the Usos, all of them due to illegal interference. At TLC, 3MB's winning streak came to an end at the hands of The Miz, Alberto Del Rio and the Brooklyn Brawler. The next night at the Slammy Awards, 3MB lost again to Miz, Del Rio, and Tommy Dreamer. McIntyre and Mahal often interfered in Slater's matches on Slater's behalf, defending the leader of the trio. On the 20th Anniversary of Raw on January 14, 3MB won an Over the Top Challenge against Sheamus. Slater and McIntyre represented 3MB in the NXT Tag Team Championship tournament to crown the inaugural champions, but lost in the first round by Adrian Neville and Oliver Grey on the January 23 NXT. He competed in the Royal Rumble coming from number 10, but was eliminated by John Cena. On the April 12 episode of SmackDown Slater, along with the rest of 3MB, attempted to ambush Triple H as he was addressing Brock Lesnar, however The Shield then came out and attacked them. On the April 15 episode on Raw, 3MB called out The Shield but instead, Brock Lesnar came out and attacked the three of them, delivering the F-5 on Slater twice on the barricade. Two weeks later on Raw, 3MB attacked The Shield, who would quickly turn the tables on them. Team Hell No came to the ring, seemingly to aid 3MB, but The Shield escaped and Team Hell No attacked 3MB instead. Over the next couple months, the group continued being used as part-timers but mostly as jobbers, while doing that on the main brand TV shows they would feud with Zack Ryder on Superstars.

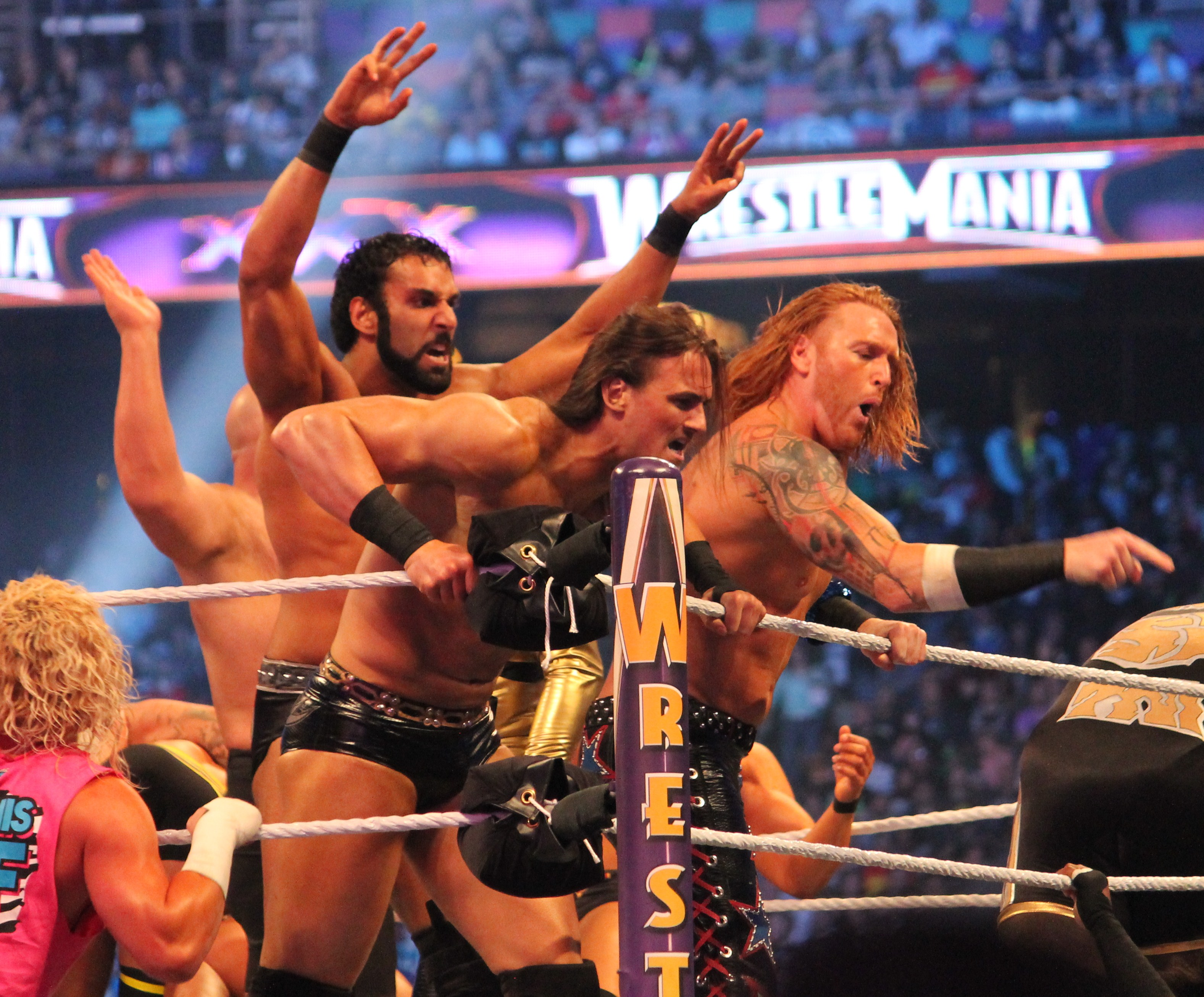
3MB at WrestleMania XXX in April 2014

On the November 11, 2013, edition of Raw, while on tour in the UK, 3MB changed their name to The Union Jacks, but were defeated by Santino Marella and Los Matadores. On the November 13, 2013, episode of Main Event, Slater and McIntyre would defeat The Prime Time Players. On the November 15, 2013, episode of SmackDown, The Union Jacks were defeated by R-Truth and The Prime Time Players. On the November 18, 2013 country music episode of Raw, 3MB competed as The Rhinestone Cowboys. McIntyre and Mahal lost to R-Truth and the debuting Xavier Woods in Nashville, Tennessee. Similarly, this trend of name changes continued to amount the group losses as they also lost to The Prime Time Players on SmackDown, as The Fabulous 3Birds, which was a play on legendary tag team, The Fabulous Freebirds. On the November 29, 2013, episode of SmackDown, they were billed as The Plymouth Rockers, a play on The Rockers tag team, even coming out to the Rockers' theme music and faced Los Matadores, along with their mascot, El Torito in a losing effort. Shortly after that match, Slater took time off from WWE to deal with personal issues. He returned on the January 6, 2014, edition of Raw, which saw 3MB defeated by Rikishi and Too Cool. On April 4, 2014, Slater broke his losing streak, picking up the win against Kofi Kingston on Superstars. At WrestleMania XXX, all three members entered the Andre the Giant Memorial Battle Royal and eliminated both The Great Khali and Xavier Woods as a unit, before all three were eliminated by Mark Henry. After WrestleMania, 3MB entered a feud with Los Matadores, which saw Hornswoggle ally himself with the trio so as to feud with El Torito. 3MB won their first match since December 2012 after Slater and McIntyre beat Los Matadores on the April 28, 2014, edition of Raw. On June 12, 2014, both Mahal and McIntyre were released from their WWE contracts, thus disbanding 3MB.

==== Slater-Gator and Social Outcasts (2014–2016) ====
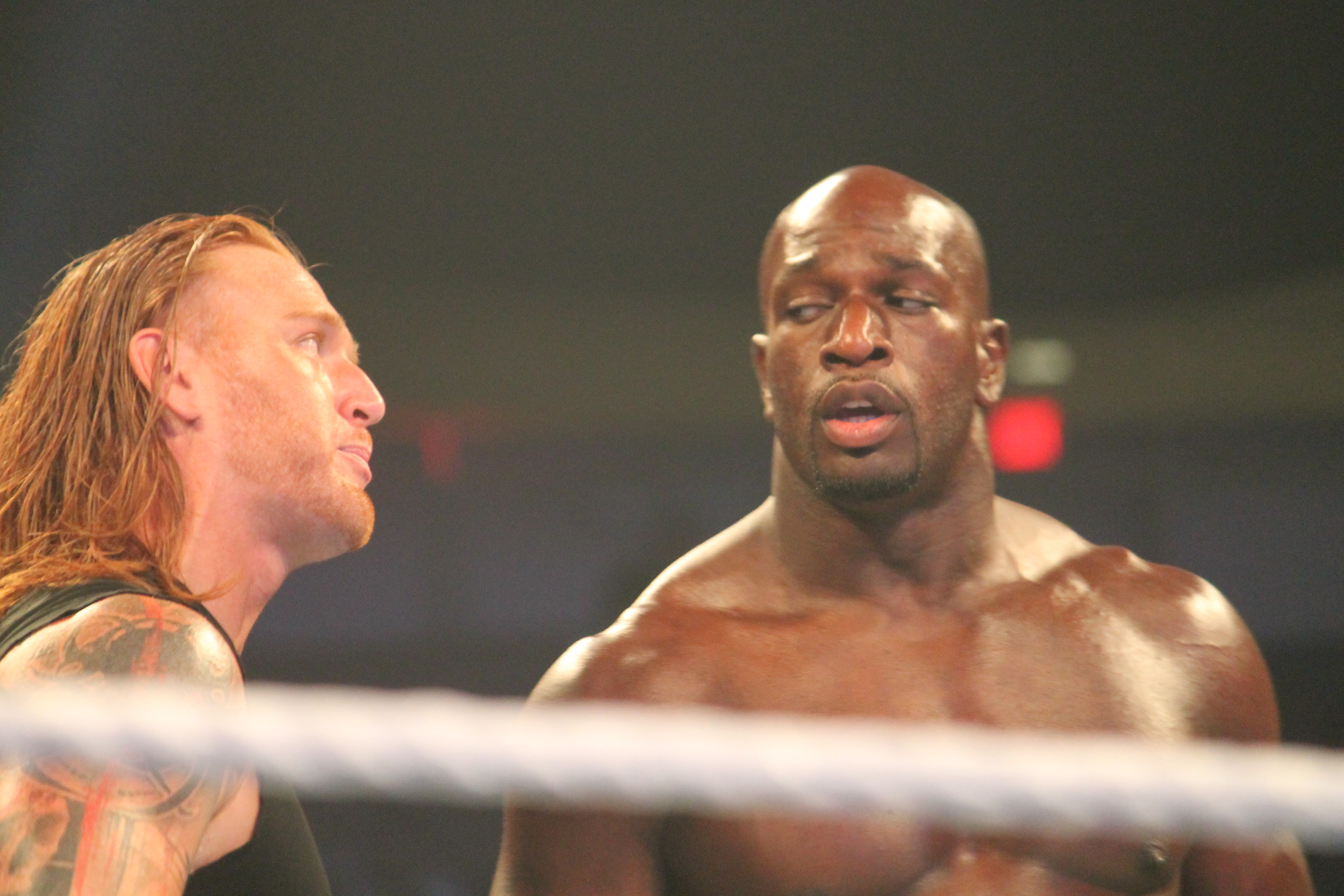
Slater-Gator in September 2014

On the June 16, 2014, edition of Raw, Slater showed signs of a face turn as he stood up to Rusev and Lana by responding to their anti-American promos. However, he was quickly defeated by Rusev, who applied the Accolade on Slater to get the win. On the June 26, 2014, episode of Superstars, Slater faced Adam Rose in a losing effort. On the July 11, 2014, edition of SmackDown, Slater teamed up with Titus O'Neil to face The Usos in a match which Usos won. At Battleground, Slater competed in a battle royal for the vacant Intercontinental Championship; Slater managed to eliminate Cesaro but was then quickly eliminated by Sheamus. On the July 21, 2014, episode of Raw, Slater confronted Flo Rida about their previous confrontation. This resulted in Flo Rida once again pushing Slater to the ground. Slater then began to regularly team up with Titus O'Neil. On the July 29, 2014, episode of Main Event, Slater and O'Neil became known as "Slater Gator" and picked up their first win over Tyson Kidd and Zack Ryder.

On the August 4, 2014, episode of Raw, thanks to a distraction from Dean Ambrose, Slater scored an upset victory over Seth Rollins and he followed it up a week later with a count-out victory over Dolph Ziggler thanks to yet another distraction, this time from The Miz. During this period, Slater Gator also scored victories on Main Event over Los Matadores and Gold and Stardust. Slater's brief winning streak was ended when Slater Gator were defeated by Los Matadores on the August 25, 2014, edition of Raw. Slater Gator then began a feud with Adam Rose and his bunny, who has attacked Slater on many occasions. In his return to Raw on November 17, 2014, he returned in Uncle Sam attire and became the next victim against Rusev. Later at Survivor Series, Slater remained and Titus O'Neil lost to Adam Rose and The Bunny. In December 2014, a warrant for Slater's arrest was issued, rendering him inactive until all legal issues are resolved. The charges were dropped on January 15, 2015. Slater returned to action in a dark match against Luke Harper on February 3, 2015. On the February 12, 2015, edition of SmackDown, Slater Gator competed in a tag team turmoil match, where they were quickly defeated by the team of Daniel Bryan and Roman Reigns.

On the February 16, 2015, episode of Raw, O'Neil made a face turn and reformed the Prime Time Players with Darren Young, effectively disbanding Slater Gator. Later that night, Slater stated on social media, "I'm going to start focusing on ME!!! I'm better on my own ... It's about time I get what I deserve," cementing their breakup. Shortly afterwards, Slater debuted a shorter haircut. At WrestleMania 31, Slater competed in the 30-man Andre the Giant Memorial Battle Royal, which was won by Big Show. Slater returned to the scenes on the April 20, 2015, edition of Raw when he was at catering, only to receive an RKO through the table by Randy Orton. On the May 28, 2015, edition of Superstars, Slater picked up a victory against Adam Rose. Slater would appear mostly on Superstars and Main Event losing to the likes of Fandango, Neville, R-Truth, and Zack Ryder. Slater started appearing on Raw, trying to answer John Cena's United States Championship Open Challenge, but was denied each week.

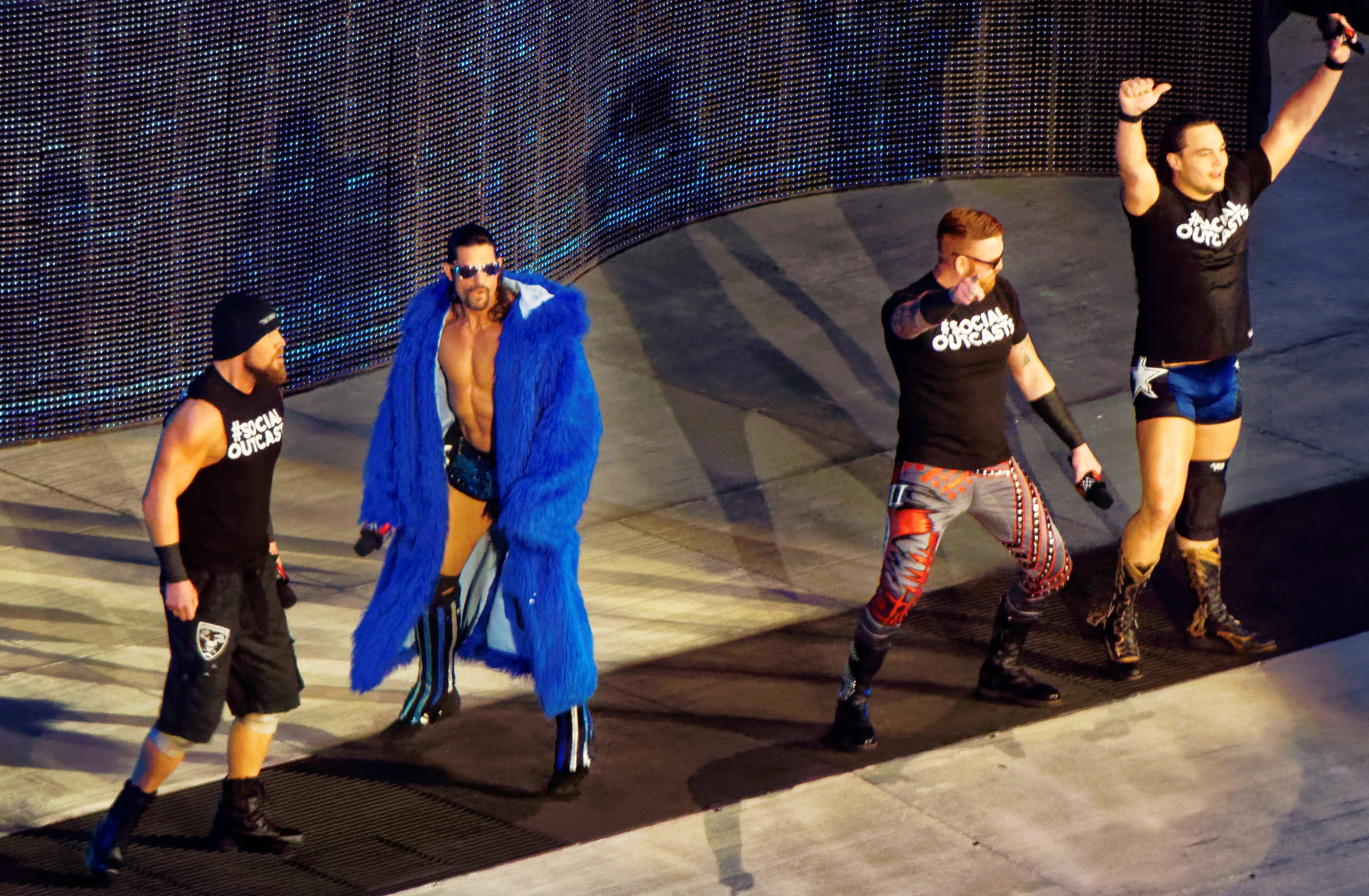
The Social Outcasts in April 2016

On the January 4, 2016 Raw, Slater debuted a new stable of himself, Curtis Axel, Adam Rose and Bo Dallas calling themselves "social outcasts". Slater went on to defeat Dolph Ziggler after interference from his stablemates. On the January 11 episode of Raw, now billed as The Social Outcasts, the group would face The Wyatt Family to a no contest when Ryback got involved. On the January 14 episode of SmackDown, the four defeated the team of Goldust, Damien Sandow, Jack Swagger and Zack Ryder in an eight-man tag match. On the February 15 episode of Raw, Slater defeated Zack Ryder with the help of The Social Outcasts. On April 3, Slater competed in the 3rd annual André the Giant Memorial Battle Royal at WrestleMania 32 but was eliminated. In May, The Social Outcasts began filming The Marine 5: Battleground, taking them out of action.

The Social Outcasts returned on the June 27 episode of Raw, confronting Enzo Amore and Big Cass. The following week on Raw, The Social Outcasts faced Enzo Amore and Big Cass in a losing effort.

==== Teaming with Rhyno (2016–2019) ====
I was shocked to hear the amount of support he mustered from the crowd ... Slater is very clearly a valuable role-player, and it seems the crowd has a lot of respect for his work.

— Pro Wrestling Torch writer Brandon LeClair after Slater's appearance on SmackDown in July 2016.

While his fellow Social Outcast members got drafted by the end of the 2016 WWE draft, Slater was the only active Superstar not selected by either show. Slater appeared on the July 26 episode of SmackDown, cutting a highly acclaimed worked shoot promo addressing the issue, only to be attacked by a returning Rhyno shortly after. During the next few weeks, Slater faced other wrestlers to win a contract, but he was defeated. Despite not appearing at the event, WWE audiences chanted "we want Slater" during the brawl between Roman Reigns and Rusev at SummerSlam, as well as the following night on Raw.

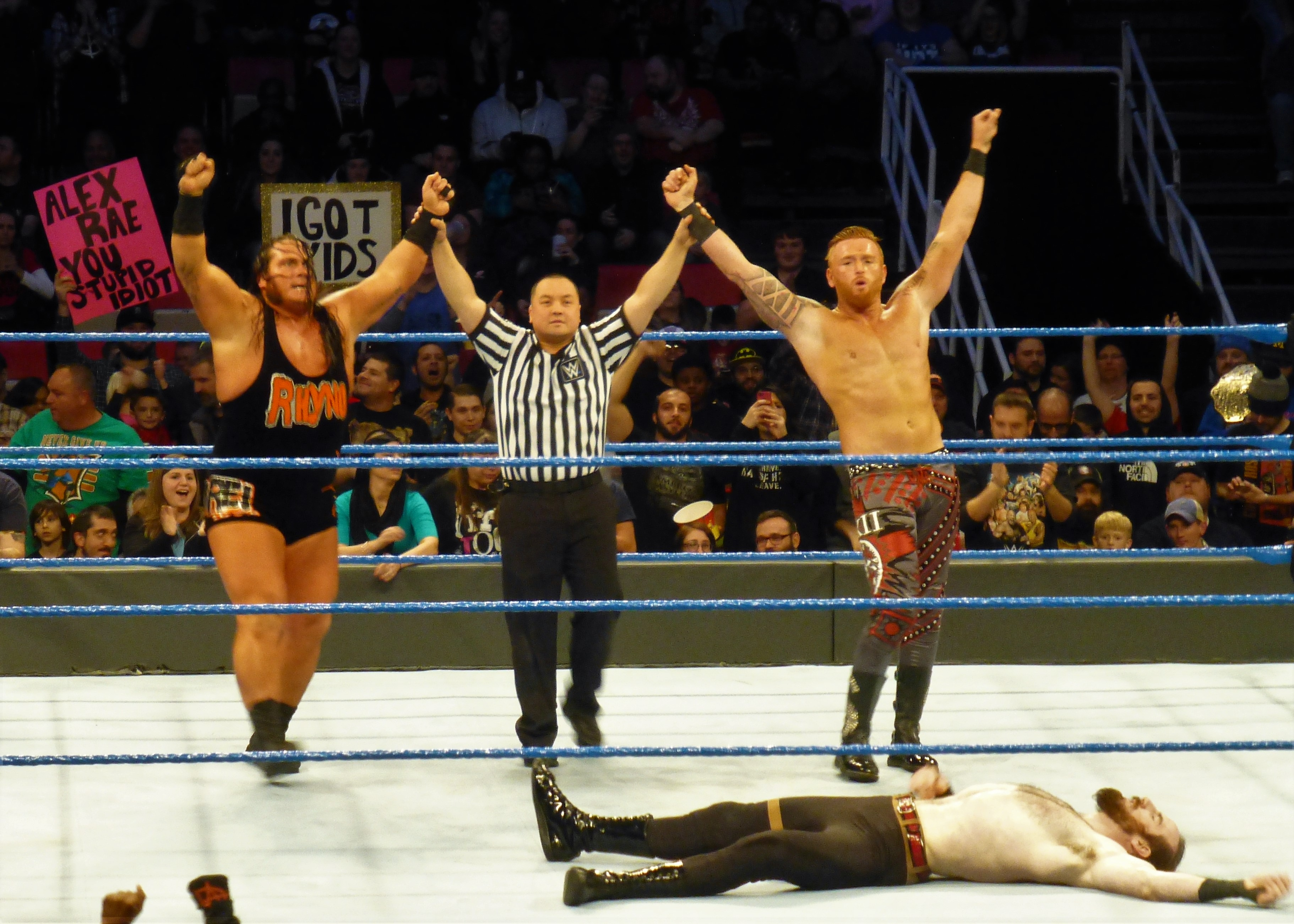
Slater (right) and Rhyno after a victory in December 2016

During this time, Slater started a gimmick as a desperate father with several children to support, including the catchphrase "I got kids", which would slowly turn Slater to a fan favorite for the first time since 2010. He eventually signed with SmackDown and found an unlikely ally in Rhyno, with the two emerging victorious in the finals of a tag team tournament at Backlash, defeating The Usos and becoming the inaugural SmackDown Tag Team Champions. On October 9 at No Mercy, Slater and Rhyno successfully defended the titles against The Usos. At Survivor Series, Slater and Rhyno were the team captains for Team SmackDown in the 10–on–10 Survivor Series Tag Team Elimination match, where they were defeated by Team Raw. At TLC: Tables Ladders and Chairs, Slater and Rhyno's reign came to an end at 84 days after they were defeated by Randy Orton and Bray Wyatt. Two days later on SmackDown, Slater and Rhyno received their rematch but failed to regain the titles. At Elimination Chamber on February 12, 2017, the duo were the first entrants into the tag team turmoil match for the titles, eliminating Breezango and the Vaudevillains before being eliminated by The Usos. At WrestleMania 33, Slater and Rhyno both competed in the André the Giant Memorial Battle Royal, but neither were able to win.

On the April 10 episode of Raw, both Slater and Rhyno were sent to the Raw brand as part of the Superstar Shake-up. On the June 5 episode of Raw, Slater and Rhyno unsuccessfully challenged Cesaro and Sheamus for the Raw Tag Team Championship. After pinning The Miz in a tag team match on the June 12 episode of Raw, Slater was awarded an Intercontinental Championship match against Miz on the July 3 episode of Raw, which he lost. On the October 30 episode of Raw, Slater and Rhyno defeated The Club in an All Hallow's Eve Trick or Street Fight. He entered the 2018 Royal Rumble as the fifth entrant, but was attacked by Baron Corbin before he could enter the ring. He would then repeatedly be attacked by incoming entrants, keeping him from entering the ring. The eleventh entrant, Sheamus, inserted him to the ring and Slater immediately eliminated him in a huge upset, but was eliminated seconds later by Bray Wyatt. At WrestleMania 34, Slater entered the fifth annual André the Giant Memorial Battle Royal, but did not win. He also participated in the 50-man Royal Rumble match at the Greatest Royal Rumble, where he entered at number 36. However, he was eliminated by eventual winner Braun Strowman.

On the December 3 episode of Raw, acting general manager Baron Corbin forced Slater and Rhyno to fight each other with the stipulation that the loser will be fired. Slater won, but Corbin immediately repositioned him as a referee instead of a competitor. The following week on Raw, Slater refereed a match between Elias and Lio Rush, where he allowed Bobby Lashley to attack Elias, leading to Rush's win. Later that same night, he attempted to cost Seth Rollins the Intercontinental Championship by helping Corbin during their match, but failed. At TLC: Tables, Ladders & Chairs, Slater was scheduled to referee a TLC match between Braun Strowman and Baron Corbin, but during the match Slater took off his referee shirt (with help from Apollo Crews, Bobby Roode, Chad Gable, Finn Bálor, and Kurt Angle) and attacked Corbin, allowing Strowman to win the match. The next night, the McMahon family (Vince, Stephanie, Shane, and Triple H) announced that they will collectively be in charge of Raw and SmackDown. Corbin begged to be the permanent Raw general manager, but the family announced that he would have to win a no disqualification handicap match against Angle, Crews, Roode, and Gable with Slater as referee, which he lost. After Corbin was removed from power, Rhyno returned to aid Slater against an attack from Jinder Mahal on the December 24 episode of Raw. The following week on Raw, Slater and Rhyno faced Mahal and The Singh Brothers in a losing effort. At WrestleMania 35, Slater competed in the sixth annual André the Giant Memorial Battle Royal, but failed to win. On July 17, their team ended after Rhyno left WWE.

==== Final appearances (2019–2020) ====
On the June 24 episode of Raw, Slater briefly captured the 24/7 Championship from R-Truth before immediately losing it to back to Truth. This marked Slater's first singles championship win in WWE. As part of the 2019 draft, Slater was drafted to SmackDown brand. On the February 7, 2020, episode of SmackDown, Slater appeared in backstage segment with Daniel Bryan, trying to sympathize with the latter following a recent loss to Bray Wyatt. Slater's poor choice of words led to a match between him and Bryan, where Bryan emerged victorious. The two had a rematch two weeks later, where Bryan was once again the victor.

On April 15, 2020, he was released from his WWE performers contract due to budget cuts resulting from the COVID-19 pandemic, ending his 14-year tenure with the company. On the July 6 episode of Raw, Slater, still under a 90-day no-compete clause, appeared to confront his former 3MB teammate Drew McIntyre, and he demanded a match against McIntyre, which he lost easily. After the match, Slater was attacked by Dolph Ziggler before being saved by McIntyre as the two embraced and shared a moment in the ring together. His no-compete clause expired on July 14, 2020.

=== Impact Wrestling (2020–2023) ===
On July 18, 2020, at Slammiversary, Miller, now known as Heath, made his Impact Wrestling debut, declaring himself as a free agent before being interrupted by Rohit Raju, who insulted Heath before Heath attacked him. Heath would then run in to his former tag team partner Rhino backstage before being told to leave the building by Impact executive Scott D'Amore as he was not an Impact employee. On the August 4 episode of Impact!, Heath made his in-ring debut by challenging Moose for the TNA World Heavyweight Championship and a spot on the roster, but was defeated. Despite this, he and Rhino began a "#Heath4IMPACT" campaign to convince the company to sign Heath, even getting celebrity endorsements from David Hasselhoff, Flava Flav, Nancy Kerrigan and Chuck Norris.

At Victory Road, Heath and Rhino teamed for the first time in Impact, where they defeated Reno Scum (Adam Thornstowe and Luster the Legend). Three days later, Scott D'Amore offered Heath a contract, however, contract talks broke down. D'Amore eventually allowed Heath and Rhino to enter the Call Your Shot Gauntlet match at Bound for Glory, and if either man won, Heath would get his contract, and if neither won, Rhino would be fired. At Bound for Glory, Rhino won the match, thus winning Heath an Impact contract, however, Heath suffered an injury during the match.

After an absence of almost a year, he returned from injury on the September 30, 2021, episode of Impact!, saving Rhino from a potential attack by Violent By Design, a stable that Rhino used to be a part of. At Bound for Glory, Heath and Rhino defeated Violent By Design (Deaner and Joe Doering). afterwards Heath and Rhino decided to challenge VBD to one more match at Turning Point, which was accepted and at the event Rhino and Heath were defeated. At Turning Point, Heath and Rhino lost to Violent By Design (Eric Young and Joe Doering). On the Under Siege preshow, Heath and Rhino defeated Raj Singh and Shera. At Against All Odds, Heath, America's Most Wanted (Chris Harris and James Storm), and The Good Brothers (Doc Gallows and Karl Anderson) defeated Honor No More (Eddie Edwards, Kenny King, Matt Taven, Mike Bennett, and PCO) in a ten man tag team match. At Victory Road, Heath, Josh Alexander, and Rich Swann lost to Honor No More (Eddie Edwards, Matt Taven, and Mike Bennett).

At Bound for Glory, Heath competed in 20-person Intergender Call Your Shot Gauntlet which was won by Bully Ray. On October 8, 2022, during the Impact! taping, Heath and Rhino defeated The Kingdom to become to the new Impact World Tag Team Champions, marking his first title in Impact Wrestling. At Over Drive, Heath and Rhino defeated the Major Players (Brian Myers and Matt Cardona) to retain the titles. On the December 15 episode of Impact Wrestling, Heath and Rhino lost the tag team championship to the Motor City Machine Guns.

At Hard To Kill, Heath and Rhino competed in a Four-way tag team elimination match for the Impact World Tag Team Championship but failed to win the titles. at No Surrender, Heath competed in a Four-way match to determine the #1 contender to the Impact World Championship which was won by Steve Maclin. at Rebellion, Heath and Rhino lost to Champagne Singh and Shera during the preshow. At Against All Odds, Heath competed in the 8-4-1 match to determine the #1 contender to the Impact World Championship which was won by Nick Aldis. At Bound for Glory, Heath competed in 20-person Intergender Call Your Shot Gauntlet which was won by Jordynne Grace.

On October 27, 2023, it was reported that Heath's contract had expired.

=== Independent circuit (2020–present) ===
After being released by WWE and while working for Impact, Slater debuted at Lariato Pro Wrestling on September 12, 2020, in Dublin, Georgia defeating Jay Bradley.

In December of 2023 Slater teamed up with Oak Hill Middle School in West Virginia, for a charity wrestling event called "Running with the Devil" to raise donations for deserving children.

On November 23, 2024, Slater unsuccessfully challenged Evan Golden for the Beside the Ring Championship in Elizabethton, Tennessee. After E.Z. Money blinded special enforcer Buff Bagwell at ringside, Slater was knocked out by Golden with brass knuckles, allowing Golden to retain the title.

== Other media ==
Miller was one of the main cast members of The JBL and Renee Show from 2013 to 2015 on WWE.com, where he played "Big" Clem Layfield, a storyline nephew of John "Bradshaw" Layfield.

Miller was the host of WWE Game Night on WWE.com and WWE's YouTube channel.

Miller, as Heath Slater, is a playable character in the video games WWE '12, WWE '13, WWE 2K14, WWE 2K16, WWE 2K17, WWE 2K18, WWE 2K19 and WWE 2K20.

== Personal life ==
Miller married his high school girlfriend Stephanie Jean Houck (November 6, 1985) in 2011; they have two daughters named Rozalyn Houck Miller (August 28, 2012) Remmy Monroe Houck Miller (June 5, 2014) reside in Fort Mill, South Carolina.

Miller remains friends with Scottish wrestler Drew McIntyre and Indo-Canadian wrestler Raj Dhesi (formerly Jinder Mahal), who were his stablemates in the team 3MB during his time in WWE.

In 2016 Miller donated clothing, cleaning supplies and other necessities to victims of severe flooding in his home state of West Virginia. He also took part in relief efforts and loading supplies. In 2017 Miller opened the Face 2 Face wrestling academy in Atlanta, Georgia.

== Filmography ==
=== Film ===
Year	Title	Role
2017	The Marine 5: Battleground	Cash

=== Web shows ===
Year	Title	Role
2013	The JBL and Cole Show	Himself
2013–2015	The JBL and Renee Show	Himself/"Big" Clem Layfield
2016–2017	WWE Game Night	Himself (a.k.a. Mr. Miller)
2017	Southpaw Regional Wrestling	Pelvis Wesley
2021–present	Heath House	Himself

== Championships and accomplishments ==
- All Star Wrestling
  - ASW Heavyweight Championship (1 time)
- Appalachian Championship Wrestling
  - ACW Six Man Tag Team Championship (1 time) – with Principal Chad and The Barbarian
- Asylum Pro Wrestling
  - Asylum Heavyweight Championship (1 time, current)
- Florida Championship Wrestling
  - FCW Florida Heavyweight Championship (1 time)
  - FCW Southern Heavyweight Championship (1 time)
  - FCW Florida Tag Team Championship (1 time) – with Joe Hennig
- Fortitude Wrestling Entertainment
  - FWE Heavyweight Championship (1 time)
- Figure Wrestling Federation
  - FWF Interstate Championship (1 time)
- Georgia Championship Wrestling
  - GCW Columbus Championship (1 time)
- Imagine Wrestling
  - Imagine Tag Team Championship (1 time, current) – with Braden Elliott
- Impact Wrestling
  - Impact World Tag Team Championship (1 time) – with Rhino
  - Moment of the Year (2020) – debuting on Impact at Slammiversary, shared with the other returns and debuts that night
- Insane Wrestling Revolution
  - IWR World Tag Team Championship (1 time) – with Rhino
  - Insane Rumble (2023)
- Lariato Pro Wrestling Guild
  - Lariato Pro Championship (1 time)
- Pro Wrestling Epic
  - PWE Interstate Championship (1 time)
- Pro Wrestling Illustrated
  - Feud of the Year (2010) The Nexus vs. WWE
  - Most Hated Wrestler of the Year (2010) as part of The Nexus
  - Ranked No. 66 of the top 500 singles wrestlers in the PWI 500 in 2011
- Rolling Stone
  - Ranked No. 7 of the 10 best WWE wrestlers of 2016
- Squared Circle Expo
  - SCX Tag Team Championship (1 time) – with Rhino
- World Classic Professional Big Time Wrestling
  - Ohio State National Championship (1 time, current)
- Wrestling With Purpose
  - WWP Championship (1 time, current)
- World Wrestling Entertainment/WWE
  - WWE 24/7 Championship (1 time)
  - WWE Tag Team Championship (3 times) – with Justin Gabriel
  - WWE SmackDown Tag Team Championship (1 time, inaugural) – with Rhyno
  - Slammy Award (1 time)
    - Shocker of the Year (2010) The debut of The Nexus
- Xtreme Intense Championship Wrestling
  - XICW Tag Team Championship (1 time) – with Rhino
