= Vladimir Kozlov =

Ukrainian-American actor and former professional wrestler

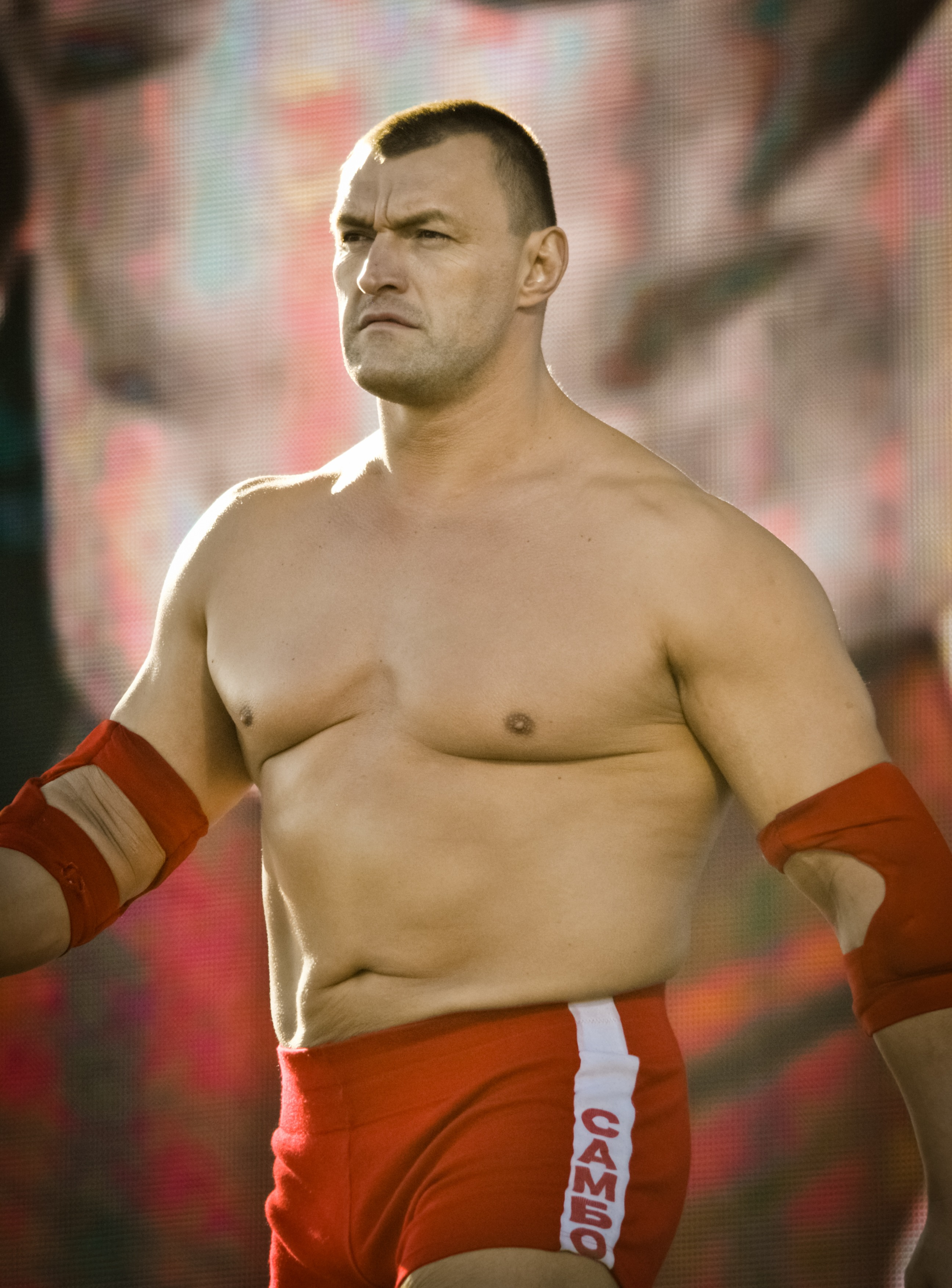
- Kozlov in 2010

Personal information
- Born: Oleh Oleksandrovych Prudius; April 27, 1969 (age 57) Kiev, Ukrainian SSR, Soviet Union (now Kyiv, Ukraine)

Professional wrestling career
- Ring name(s): Alexander Kozlov; Oleg Prudius; Vladimir Kozlov
- Billed height: 6 ft 8 in (203 cm)
- Billed weight: 302 lb (137 kg)
- Billed from: Moscow, Russia
- Trained by: Deep South Wrestling; Ohio Valley Wrestling
- Debut: April 7, 2006

Oleg Aleksandrovich Prudius (Note: Ukrainian: Олег Олександрович Прудіус, romanized: Oleh Oleksandrovych Prudius; Russian: Олег Александрович Прудиус, romanized: Oleg Aleksandrovich Prudius) (born April 27, 1969) better known by his ring name Vladimir Kozlov, is a Ukrainian actor and professional wrestler. He is best known for his time in WWE, where he won the WWE Tag Team Championship once with Santino Marella. He is trained in freestyle wrestling, rugby, football, sambo, kickboxing, judo, jujutsu, Brazilian jiu-jitsu and mixed martial arts.

Prudius signed a development contract with World Wrestling Entertainment in 2006 and was assigned to WWE's developmental system, Deep South Wrestling. He would later be reassigned to Ohio Valley Wrestling, where he won the OVW Heavyweight Championship. He made his debut on SmackDown as Vladimir Kozlov on April 4, 2008. He was given a big push during his first few months on SmackDown, including a clean victory over The Undertaker. At Survivor Series 2008, Kozlov faced Triple H and Edge for the WWE Championship in a losing effort. At the end of 2008, he received the Slammy Award from WWE as the Breakout Star of the year. However, in the awards voting for the independent Wrestling Observer Newsletter, Kozlov was voted as the Most Overrated Wrestler of the year, and his match at Survivor Series match was voted as the Worst Match of the Year. In 2009, Kozlov was assigned to WWE's third brand, ECW, where he teamed with William Regal and Ezekiel Jackson. After the ECW brand was dissolved, he was assigned to Raw and started a tag team with Santino Marella, winning the WWE Tag Team Championships. Prudius left WWE in 2011.

Prudius has also worked as a stage and screen actor, notably having a small role in Spike Lee's 25th Hour and a walk-on role in the second season of the HBO series The Wire. Prudius also had a role in Grindhouse, appearing in the Werewolf Women of the SS trailer; in addition to his credit under his real name and his WWE persona for the appearance as well as being a former Ohio Valley Wrestling (OVW) Heavyweight Champion, Prudius was the first Ukrainian to ever wrestle for the WWE.

== Early career ==
Prudius has won numerous achievements, becoming the 2005 USA Open Heavyweight Sambo Champion and a United States Kick-Boxing Association (USKBA) International Heavyweight Grappling Champion. He also played American football as an offensive lineman for the Ukraine national team and Santa Barbara City College.

== Professional wrestling career ==
=== World Wrestling Entertainment/WWE (2006–2011) ===
==== Deep South Wrestling and Ohio Valley Wrestling (2006–2008) ====
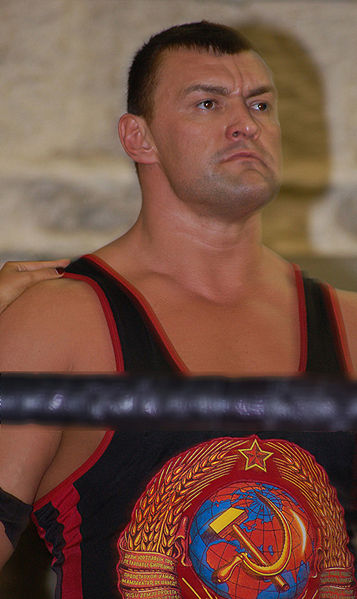
Prudius in August 2007

On January 17, 2006, World Wrestling Entertainment (WWE) announced that Prudius had signed a developmental deal and was sent to Deep South Wrestling (DSW). On April 7, 2006, he debuted under his real name and had his first match in DSW against Bobby Walker.

On May 5, 2006, Prudius had his first untelevised WWE match during a house show in San Jose, California, defeating Rob Conway. The next night, at another house show in Sacramento, California, Matt Striker cut a promo on Prudius, calling him a "filthy immigrant", causing Prudius to attack him. Prudius then picked up the microphone and said that he is "proud to be in America".

On the December 18, 2006 episode of Raw, Prudius made an appearance as a WWE prospect named Vladimir Kozlov or Moscow Mauler, which became his ring name. For the next several weeks, Kozlov was interviewed on WWE programming, proclaiming his love for "Double Double E" (WWE), but also began drawing a villainous response after declaring his superiority over whatever wrestlers were competing at the time, saying "I could beat both of them". He then was taken off television for over a year while working in the developmental system Ohio Valley Wrestling and participating in a number of dark matches against Val Venis, Eugene Dinsmore, Super Crazy, including defeating Scotty 2 Hotty at Armageddon 2006, all of which he won.

On July 28, 2007, in Louisville, Kentucky, Kozlov won the OVW Heavyweight Championship by defeating Paul Burchill, but gave the championship the same night to Michael W. Kruel due to an agreement they made before. Kozlov continued working in house show for WWE in fall of 2007. He stayed with OVW until February 2008 when WWE parted ways with Ohio Valley Wrestling.

==== WWE Championship pursuits (2008–2009) ====
On the April 4, 2008 episode of SmackDown, Kozlov made his official WWE debut as a heel, with the unique quirk of having no entrance music and no Titantron video – his "entrance" consisted of complete darkness except for a solitary spotlight following him to the ring. He defeated Matt Bentley in his first match, and over the following weeks, Kozlov would go on to easily win several matches, first against local talent and then established names including Colin Delaney, Funaki, Nunzio, Shannon Moore, Jimmy Wang Yang, Jamie Noble, and Domino. On the July 11 episode of SmackDown, Kozlov debuted an entrance theme and Titantron video as he defeated Stevie Richards.

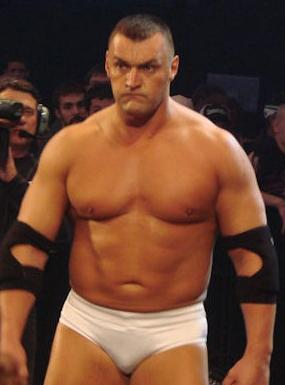
Kozlov on SmackDown in 2008

In the following weeks, as Kozlov continued to easily win matches, he began demanding "better competition". On the September 12 episode of SmackDown, he started to seek that competition, attacking Jeff Hardy. Over the following weeks, Kozlov would continue attacking both Hardy and the WWE Champion Triple H, eventually starting a loose feud between the three of them over the WWE Championship. On the November 7 episode of SmackDown, Kozlov earned a match against Triple H for the WWE title at Survivor Series after defeating The Undertaker by disqualification after he was attacked by Jeff Hardy. The match was originally intended to include Kozlov, Jeff Hardy, and Triple H, although Hardy was removed due to a storyline injury. The result of this was the addition of Edge to the match while it was in progress, and ultimately Edge would go on to pin Triple H and win the title.

Continuing his pursuit of the WWE Championship, Kozlov competed in and was unsuccessful in winning a Beat the Clock Challenge match against ECW Champion Matt Hardy for another title shot. This led to the two meeting at Armageddon, where Kozlov gained his first pay-per-view win by defeating Hardy in a non-title match. Kozlov competed in the 2009 Royal Rumble match, entering as the sixth participant, but was eliminated by Triple H after eliminating The Great Khali, Carlito, and Montel Vontavious Porter. He then qualified to be part of the No Way Out Elimination Chamber match, where he was pinned for the first time after receiving a Last Ride from The Undertaker, though he still remained unpinned in one-on-one competition. Kozlov's undefeated streak in televised singles competition ended on the March 2, 2009, episode of Raw, in which he was defeated by Shawn Michaels; this match was for the opportunity to face The Undertaker at WrestleMania 25. His first televised singles loss on SmackDown came against The Undertaker himself on March 13.

==== The Ruthless Roundtable (2009–2010) ====
On April 13, 2009, Kozlov was drafted to the ECW brand as part of the 2009 WWE draft, as ECW's only pick of the night. Shortly after the draft, his character was tweaked to further highlight the training he received within the Russian military. He won his first match on the brand when he easily defeated a local competitor. On the June 30 episode of ECW on Syfy, he teamed with William Regal to defeat Christian and Tommy Dreamer. His first defeat in singles competition on ECW came on the July 7 episode of ECW, where he lost a #1 contenders match to Christian for Tommy Dreamer's ECW Championship at Night of Champions.

On July 21, Kozlov began an angle with Ezekiel Jackson in which, week after week, after one of them had easily defeated a local competitor, the other would come out and execute their finishing move on the fallen opponent in a game of one-upmanship. On the August 18 episode of ECW, Jackson was set to team with ECW Champion Christian against the team of Kozlov and number-one contender William Regal. Jackson turned on Christian, forming an alliance with Regal and Kozlov. Kozlov and Jackson aided Regal in his feud with Christian over the ECW Championship, but Regal was unable to capture the title.

On the December 15 episode of ECW, Kozlov came out with Regal to face Jackson in an ECW Homecoming battle royal qualifying match. During the match, Regal turned on Kozlov by pulling his feet while at ringside, which ultimately cost him the match. After the match, Kozlov attempted to attack Regal, but Jackson jumped him from behind and both proceeded to attack Kozlov. This split Kozlov from the Ruthless Roundtable.

==== Teaming with Santino Marella (2010–2011) ====
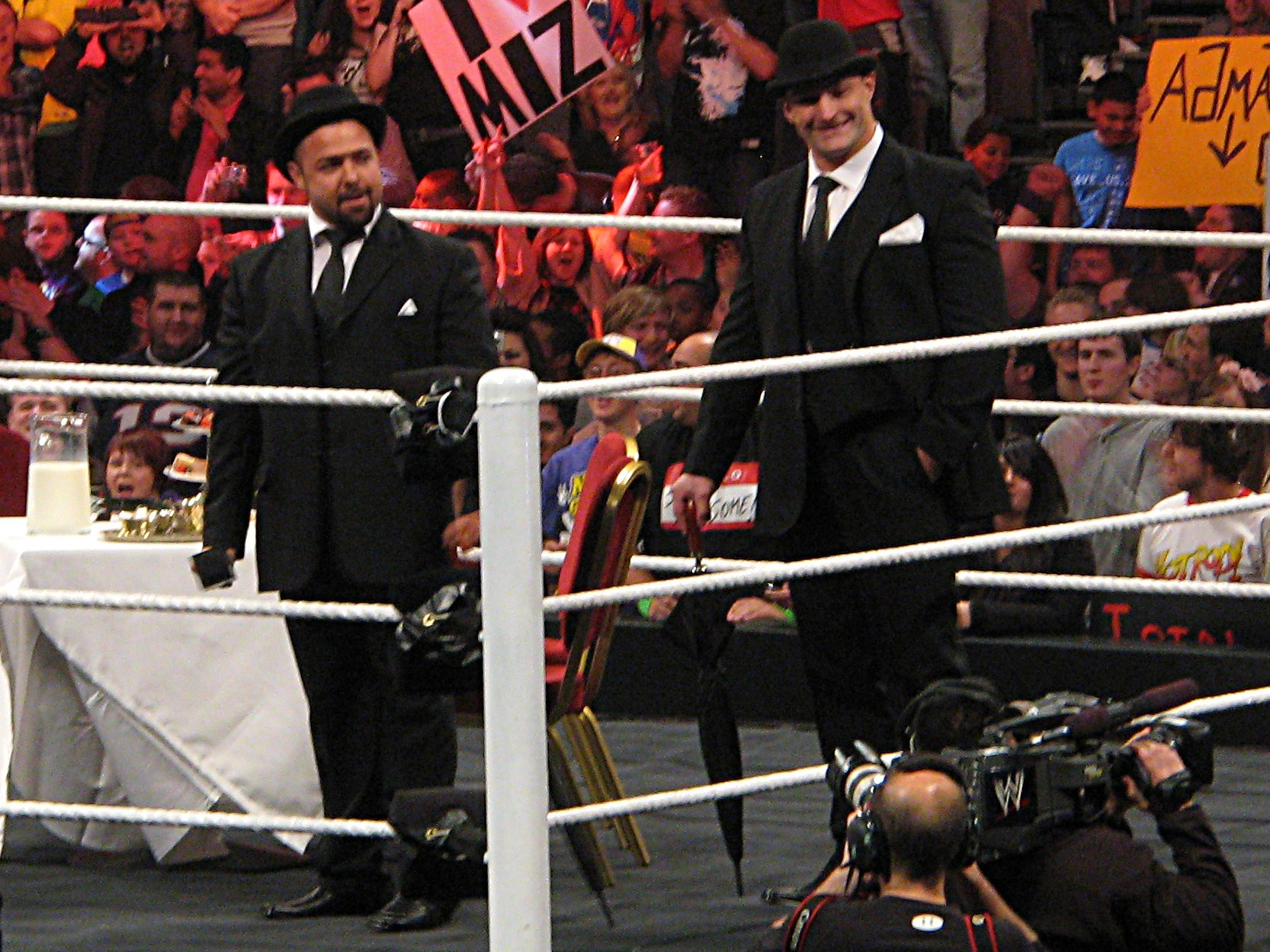
Kozlov and Marella in November 2010 on Raw in Manchester, England

When the ECW brand came to an end, Kozlov, along with all other ECW talent, became a free agent. Kozlov would make his debut for the Raw brand on March 8, 2010, in a handicap gauntlet match with John Cena competing against Kozlov, Mr. McMahon, Batista, Mark Henry, Drew McIntyre and Jack Swagger. On the May 3 episode of Raw, he would team again with his former tag team partner William Regal to face the WWE Tag Team Champions The Hart Dynasty, Kozlov and Regal were defeated when Regal tapped out to David Hart Smith's Sharpshooter.

On the May 10 episode of Raw, he appeared backstage with Santino Marella, William Regal, and Flavor Flav in a backstage segment, where Marella asked to join him in a tag team. However, Kozlov refused to join, stating that "he (Marella) always loses". On the May 31 episode of Raw, Kozlov turned face for the first time when he slammed William Regal behind the referee's back during a mixed tag team match, allowing Santino Marella and Eve Torres to pick up the win. On the June 7 episode of Raw, he and Santino Marella were forced to compete in a dance-off, which Kozlov won. On June 14 episode of Raw, Kozlov served as a special referee for the match between Regal and Marella which Marella won after Kozlov intentionally gave him a fast count. On the June 28 episode of Raw, he fought Marella one on one with the stipulation being if Kozlov loses he would become Marella's tag team partner. He won, however, with Regal interfering after the match, Kozlov stopped Regal with a big boot to the chest and then carried Marella backstage. The following week, Kozlov teamed with Marella, defeating William Regal and The Great Khali. In the following weeks, Kozlov and Santino would continue their undefeated streak on both Raw and Superstars.

At the Night of Champions, Kozlov and Marella competed in a tag team turmoil match for the WWE Tag Team Championship, but were unsuccessful as the titles were won by Drew McIntyre and Cody Rhodes. On the November 15 episode of Raw, Kozlov and Marella defeated The Usos (Jimmy and Jey) to be number one contenders for WWE Tag Team Championship. Kozlov and Marella challenged Heath Slater and Justin Gabriel for the WWE Tag Team Championship at Survivor Series, but were unsuccessful.

On the December 6 episode of Raw, Kozlov and Marella captured the WWE Tag Team Championship by defeating the defending champions Heath Slater and Justin Gabriel, Mark Henry and Yoshi Tatsu, and The Usos in a four-way elimination tag team match. At TLC: Tables, Ladders and Chairs, Kozlov and Marella defeated Slater and Gabriel via disqualification to retain the title. The duo lost the tag team titles back to Slater and Gabriel at 2011 Elimination Chamber. Kozlov was supposed to be a part of an eight-man tag match at WrestleMania XXVII. However, during a WrestleMania Axxess match, he was attacked by The Corre, Kofi Kingston took his place at the event.

On March 8, Kozlov then became the Pro to Conor O'Brian on NXT Redemption. On the March 22 episode of NXT Redemption, Kozlov and his rookie O'Brian defeated JTG and his rookie Jacob Novak in a dance-off. Afterwards, Kozlov began teaching O'Brian sambo-like dancing and board breaking. O'Brian was eliminated on the June 28, episode of NXT, being the fourth rookie eliminated from the competition. Kozlov would then go on to feud with JTG on NXT, defeating JTG on three occasions. Kozlov's last WWE match was on the August 5 episode of SmackDown, where he lost to Mark Henry. After the match, Henry (kayfabe) broke Kozlov's left leg before Sheamus came down to the ring and saved him from Henry. On the same day, WWE announced that Kozlov was released from his WWE contract. His release (as well as the releases of Chris Masters and David Hart Smith) was referenced in a worked shoot moment on the August 8 episode of Raw by WWE Champion CM Punk.

=== Inoki Genome Federation (2011–2012) ===
On August 30, 2011, it was announced that Prudius would be making his first post-WWE appearance on September 3, working for the Japanese promotion Inoki Genome Federation (IGF) under his new ring name Alexander Kozlov. He made his debut on September 3 at Genome17, losing to Eric Hammer in under three minutes. On December 2, Kozlov defeated Montanha Silva. On May 26, 2012, at the IGF Genome 20, Prudius battled Jérôme Le Banner for the IGF Championship, but lost in three minutes. On July 10, Prudius got a rematch for the title, but lost again to Jerome Le Banner.

=== Impact Wrestling/Total Nonstop Action Wrestling (2021–present) ===
On April 26, 2021, Prudius joined Impact Wrestling as a Russian-language commentator via Rutube. His debut at the 2021 Rebellion event was his first wrestling appearance in eight years. He made an on screen cameo on March 17, 2023, where he reunited with Santino Marella. On the October 12, 2023, edition of Impact Wrestling, Prudius returned to assist Dirty Dango in a five-way match.

== Other media ==
Prudius has made many television and film appearances and is actively pursuing an acting career in Hollywood. He appeared in the second season of the HBO drama series The Wire, as well as Roksalana and It's Not To Easy on Ukrainian TV. In 2002, he appeared in Spike Lee's film 25th Hour, playing a Russian mafia enforcer. He appeared in the Russian military theatre play Victory Day and a Ukraine University play Three Musketeers. In 2013 he was also featured in season 7, episode 4 of USA Network's TV series, Burn Notice. He was also a stuntman for the film The Fate of the Furious, and for John Wick 2. Oleg received his biggest acting break in the 2017 Chinese Blockbuster Wolf Warriors 2. In 2019, he appeared in the episode "One-Eyed Jacks" of the Marvel series The Punisher.

In 2009, he became a U.S. citizen.

Prudius made his video game debut as a playable character in WWE SmackDown vs. Raw 2010 and also appeared in WWE SmackDown vs. Raw 2011 and WWE '12.

In 2014, Prudius opened Quasar Entertainment, a full service production company where he's the company's Vice President.

== Other ventures ==
Prudius is the owner and creator of the Moscow Mauler Vodka brand.

== Championships and accomplishments ==
=== Kickboxing ===
- United States Kickboxing Association
  - International Heavyweight Grappling Championship (1 time)

=== Professional wrestling ===
- Ohio Valley Wrestling
  - OVW Heavyweight Championship (1 time)
- Pro Wrestling Illustrated
  - Ranked No. 53 of the top 500 singles wrestlers in the PWI 500 in 2009
- World Wrestling Entertainment/WWE
  - WWE Tag Team Championship (1 time) – with Santino Marella
  - Slammy Award (1 time)
    - Breakout Star of the Year (2008)
- Wrestling Observer Newsletter
  - Most Overrated (2008)
  - Worst Worked Match of the Year (2008) vs. Triple H and Edge at Survivor Series

=== Sambo ===
- Martial Arts League of America
  - USA Open Heavyweight Sambo Champion (2005)
