= WWE Fatal 4-Way =

2010 World Wrestling Entertainment pay-per-view event

Fatal 4-Way
- Promotional poster featuring Randy Orton
- Promotion: World Wrestling Entertainment
- Brand(s): Raw; SmackDown
- Date: June 20, 2010
- City: Uniondale, New York
- Venue: Nassau Coliseum
- Attendance: 10,000
- Buy rate: 143,000

Pay-per-view chronology
← Previous; Over the Limit	Next → Money in the Bank

Fatal 4-Way chronology
← Previous; First	Next → NXT TakeOver: Fatal 4-Way

Fatal 4-Way was a 2010 professional wrestling pay-per-view (PPV) event produced by World Wrestling Entertainment (WWE). The event took place on June 20, 2010, at the Nassau Coliseum in Uniondale, New York and was held for wrestlers from the promotion's Raw and SmackDown brand divisions. The event centered on fatal four-way matches, a four-person free-for-all where the first wrestler to score a pinfall or submission wins.

Fatal 4-Way replaced The Bash as the June 2010 PPV event. It received 143,000 pay-per-view buys, down on The Bash's figure of 178,000 buys. This would be the only Fatal 4-Way produced for the main roster (Raw and SmackDown), as it was replaced by Capitol Punishment in 2011; however, WWE revived the name and concept for their developmental brand NXT in 2014 as the second TakeOver event titled NXT TakeOver: Fatal 4-Way.

Eight matches were contested at the event, with seven broadcast on pay-per-view and one held as a dark match before the event went live. Three fatal four-way matches were held at the event, contested for the men's WWE Championship and women's WWE Divas Championship from Raw and the men's World Heavyweight Championship from SmackDown. In the main event, John Cena defended the WWE Championship against Sheamus, Edge, and Randy Orton, which Sheamus won. On the undercard, Jack Swagger defended the World Heavyweight Championship against Rey Mysterio, Big Show, and CM Punk, which Mysterio won for a second time—just like his first reign, the title was referred to simply as the World Championship due to Mysterio not being a heavyweight. In the event's other fatal four-way match, Alicia Fox defeated Gail Kim, Maryse, and defending champion Eve Torres to win the Divas Championship.

== Production ==
=== Background ===
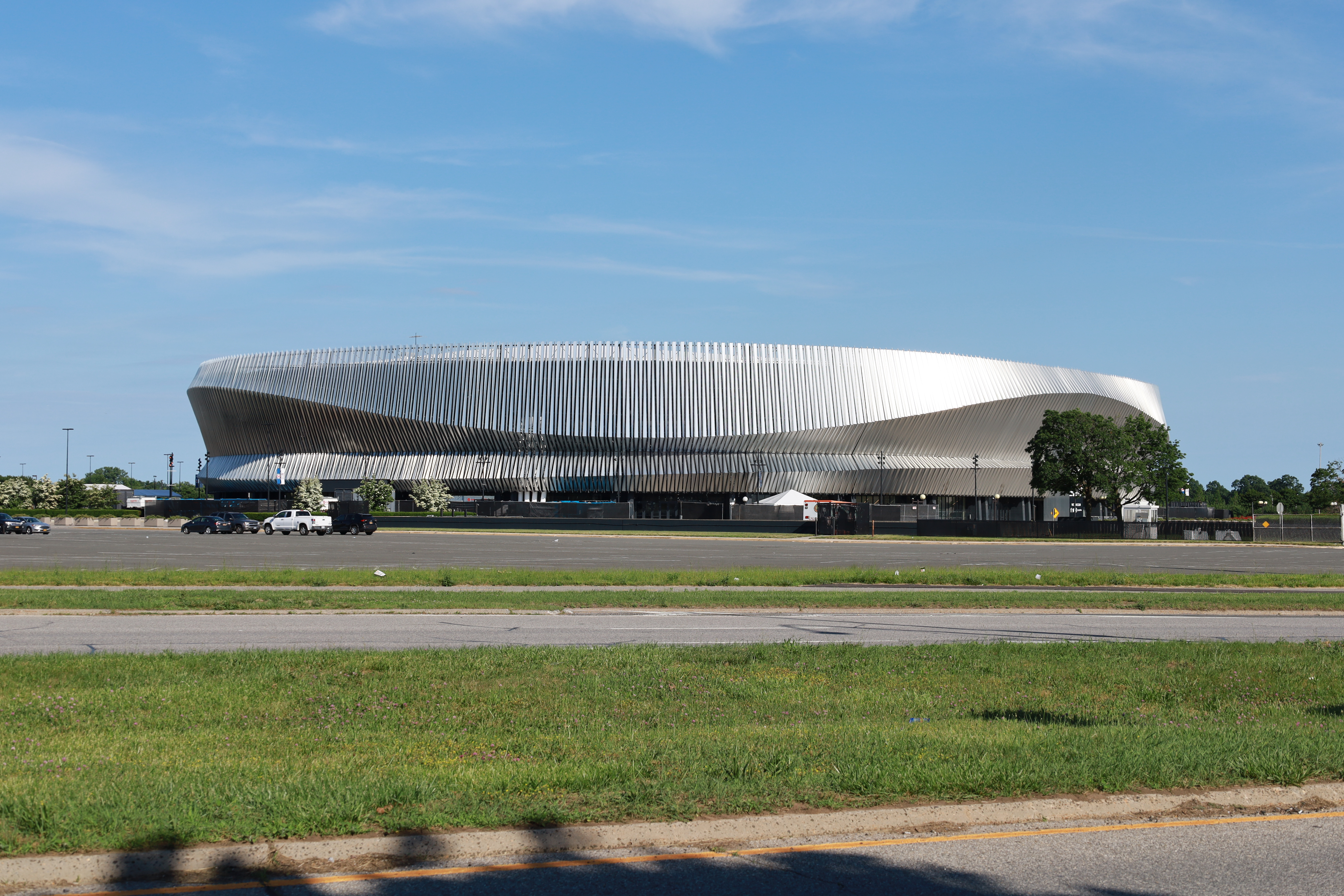
The event was held at the Nassau Coliseum in Uniondale, New York.

From 2004 to 2009, the professional wrestling company World Wrestling Entertainment (WWE) ran an annual summer pay-per-view (PPV) event titled The Great American Bash, with the 2009 event truncated as The Bash. In 2010, WWE discontinued The Bash and replaced it with Fatal 4-Way, a reference to some of the matches on the card being contested as fatal four-way matches. The event took place on June 20, 2010, at the Nassau Coliseum in Uniondale, New York and featured wrestlers from the Raw and SmackDown brand divisions. Tickets went on sale on April 24 through Ticketmaster.

=== Storylines ===
The card included matches that resulted from scripted storylines, where wrestlers portrayed heroes, villains, or less distinguishable characters in scripted events that built tension and culminated in a wrestling match or series of matches. The storylines were produced on WWE's weekly television shows, Raw and SmackDown.

The main feud for the Raw brand was a fatal four-way match for the WWE Championship between defending champion John Cena, Randy Orton, Edge, and Sheamus. After Cena retained his title against Batista in an "I Quit" match at Over the Limit, Sheamus attacked Cena. On the May 24 episode of Raw, Bret Hart was announced as the new Raw General Manager. Before Batista could cut a promo, Hart interrupted and said that if Batista wanted his rematch, then he would have to qualify. Batista refused to wrestle, citing an injury and Hart then let Orton qualify by forfeit, causing Batista to quit WWE afterwards. Edge and Sheamus won their respective qualifying matches to gain entry into the match alongside Orton. The following three weeks saw the four wrestlers compete against each other in singles and tag team bouts.

The main event for the SmackDown brand was a fatal four-way match for the World Heavyweight Championship between Jack Swagger, Big Show, CM Punk, and Rey Mysterio. At Over the Limit, Big Show defeated Swagger by disqualification but did not win the championship since it cannot change hands on a disqualification unless stipulated, and as a result qualified for the fatal four-way match. The Undertaker and CM Punk won their respective qualifying matches against Rey Mysterio and Kane. Later, Kane found his half-brother Undertaker in a storyline vegetative state, unable to compete and The Undertaker was removed from the match. A battle royal was put in place to determine The Undertaker's replacement in the match, which was won by Mysterio, who last eliminated Kane.

On the April 12 episode of Raw, Eve Torres beat Maryse for the WWE Divas Championship. When Maryse attempted to seek revenge at Over the Limit, she was defeated by Eve. On the May 17 episode, Gail Kim teamed up with Evan Bourne to defeat Alicia Fox and Zack Ryder. After this, Kim and Fox started to feud for several weeks. On the June 14 episode, the current Divas Champion, Eve, teamed up with Kim in a winning effort against Maryse and Fox and a fatal four-way match was announced between the four.

== Event ==
Other on-screen personnel
Role:	Name:
English commentators	Michael Cole
English commentators	Jerry Lawler
English commentators	Matt Striker
Spanish commentators	Carlos Cabrera
Spanish commentators	Hugo Savinovich
Ring announcers	Tony Chimel
Ring announcers	Justin Roberts
Backstage interviewer	Savannah
Referees	Charles Robinson
Referees	Rod Zapata

=== Preliminary matches ===
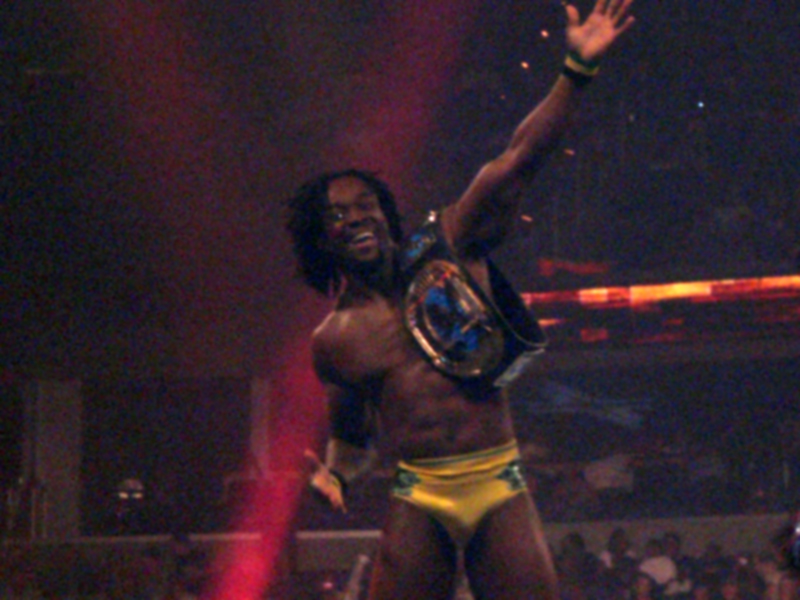
Kofi Kingston retained SmackDown's Intercontinental Championship.

The event began with Kofi Kingston defending the Intercontinental Championship against Drew McIntyre. SmackDown General Manager Theodore Long was also in attendance near the announce table. The contest was even between both competitors. Kingston executed an S.O.S. on McIntyre for a near-fall. Kingston then applied a submission near the turnbuckle, but it was countered by McIntyre, who threw Kingston's legs into referee Charles Robinson, knocking him out. Since the referee was unable to officiate the match, McIntyre forced Long to fill in for the referee. When McIntyre attempted the pin, however, Long refused to count to three. As they argued, Matt Hardy interfered and attacked McIntyre, which allowed Kingston to perform Trouble in Paradise on McIntyre. Kingston then pinned McIntyre for the win and retained the title.

The WWE Divas Championship was defended next by Eve against Alicia Fox, Maryse, and Gail Kim in a fatal four-way match. Eve performed a moonsault on Maryse, but her pin attempt was broken up by Fox, who threw Eve out of the ring. She then covered Maryse and won her first title in WWE.

Chris Jericho cut a promo, challenging Evan Bourne to an impromptu match. Jericho executed a Codebreaker on Bourne for a near-fall. The match ended when Bourne executed an Air Bourne on Jericho's back and pinned him for the win.

=== Main event matches ===
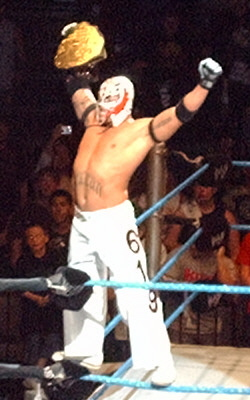
Rey Mysterio won SmackDown's World Heavyweight Championship for the second time; just like his first reign, the title was referred to simply as the World Championship due to Mysterio not being a heavyweight.

In the first main event match, Jack Swagger, Rey Mysterio, Big Show, and CM Punk competed in a fatal four-way match for the World Heavyweight Championship. Big Show dominated the first half of the match, quickly knocking down his opponents. The advantage turned when the other three concentrated their offense mainly on him taking him out for some time. The match was then contested evenly until Punk delivered a GTS to Swagger, but before he could pin him, Kane interrupted them, attempting to put Punk in a casket but Punk escaped with Kane in pursuit. Mysterio took advantage of the situation and delivered the 619 to Swagger and covered him to win the World Heavyweight Title.

In the next match, The Miz faced R-Truth for the United States Championship. The match went at a quick pace throughout and ended when Miz reversed R-Truth for a pin attempt to retain the title.

In the next match, Unified WWE Tag Team Champions The Hart Dynasty (Tyson Kidd, David Hart Smith and Natalya), faced The Usos and Tamina Snuka. The Hart Dynasty won after Natalya pinned Tamina after a Nattie-By-Nature.

In the main event, John Cena faced Sheamus, Randy Orton, and Edge in a fatal four-way match for the WWE Championship. None of the competitors stayed in the ring for long as when one would get an advantage over another opponent they would be interrupted by another one of the challengers. The match came to an abrupt end when the rookies from the first season of NXT who had previously formed a faction against the roster of the Raw brand, interrupted. The rookies first attacked Cena in the ring. Edge then tried to help him but instead was attacked by Nexus. In the midst of the commotion, Sheamus pinned Cena to win the title, bringing the event to a premature conclusion.

== Reception ==
Approximately 10,000 people attended Fatal 4-Way live at the Nassau Veterans Memorial Coliseum in Uniondale, New York.

The event received generally mixed reviews. Bob Kapur from Canadian Online Explorer's wrestling section awarded the WWE Championship match an eight out of ten and the World Heavyweight Championship match a seven out of ten. He also appreciated Chris Jericho and Evan Bourne for their performances in their match and rated the match as eight out of ten. Overall, he awarded the event a score of eight out of ten.

== Aftermath ==
On the following episode of Raw, John Cena faced Sheamus for the WWE Championship, but The Nexus interrupted the match. As a result, another title match between Cena and Sheamus was scheduled for Money in the Bank as a Steel Cage match to ensure no outside interference.

On the following SmackDown, a rematch between Rey Mysterio and Jack Swagger for the World Heavyweight Championship was scheduled for Money in the Bank.

This would be the only Fatal 4-Way produced for the main roster (Raw and SmackDown) as it was replaced by Capitol Punishment in 2011. In April 2011, WWE ceased using its full name with the "WWE" abbreviation becoming an orphaned initialism. WWE revived the event's name and concept in 2014 for their developmental brand NXT as a TakeOver event titled NXT TakeOver: Fatal 4-Way.

== Results ==
No.	Results	Stipulations	Times
1^{D}	Zack Ryder defeated Montel Vontavious Porter by pinfall	Singles match	3:38
2	Kofi Kingston (c) defeated Drew McIntyre by pinfall	Singles match for the WWE Intercontinental Championship	16:29
3	Alicia Fox defeated Eve Torres (c), Gail Kim, and Maryse by pinfall	Fatal four-way match for the WWE Divas Championship	05:42
4	Evan Bourne defeated Chris Jericho by pinfall	Singles match	12:04
5	Rey Mysterio defeated Jack Swagger (c), Big Show, and CM Punk by pinfall	Fatal four-way match for the World Heavyweight Championship	10:28
6	The Miz (c) defeated R-Truth by pinfall	Singles match for the WWE United States Championship	13:23
7	The Hart Dynasty (David Hart Smith, Natalya, and Tyson Kidd) defeated The Usos (Jey Uso and Jimmy Uso) and Tamina by pinfall	Six-person mixed tag team match	09:29
8	Sheamus defeated John Cena (c), Edge, and Randy Orton by pinfall	Fatal four-way match for the WWE Championship	17:25
(c) / – the champion(s) heading into the match; D / – this was a dark match
