= The Corre =

Professional wrestling stable

Stable
- Members: Wade Barrett; Justin Gabriel; Heath Slater; Ezekiel Jackson
- Debut: January 21, 2011
- Disbanded: June 10, 2011
- Years active: 2011

The Corre was a short-lived villainous stable in WWE. Formed in 2011, the group was a spinoff of Wade Barrett's former group The Nexus. The stable was formed after Barrett left The Nexus and aligned himself with Heath Slater and Justin Gabriel, both of whom were also Nexus members, while Ezekiel Jackson rounded out the group.

== History ==
After Wade Barrett was kicked out of The Nexus by new leader CM Punk, he moved from Raw to SmackDown. Heath Slater and Justin Gabriel also left The Nexus and were moved to the SmackDown brand, joining Barrett and Ezekiel Jackson to create The Corre. According to Slater, WWE Chairman Vince McMahon named the stable The Core, but he added an R since that name was copyrighted.

Throughout its tenure, the Corre often employed interference during matches and frequent post-match attacks. At Elimination Chamber, Gabriel and Slater became the first to gain a championship within The Corre, as they won the WWE Tag Team Championship by defeating Santino Marella and Vladimir Kozlov. This began Gabriel and Slater's second reign as WWE Tag Team Champions after their first reign as part of The Nexus. At the same event, Barrett received his first opportunity at the World Heavyweight Championship when he took part in the SmackDown Elimination Chamber match, but failed to win the championship. The following night on Raw, Gabriel and Slater lost and regained the championship to John Cena and WWE Champion The Miz. On the March 25 episode of SmackDown, Barrett also won Intercontinental Championship when he defeated Kofi Kingston.

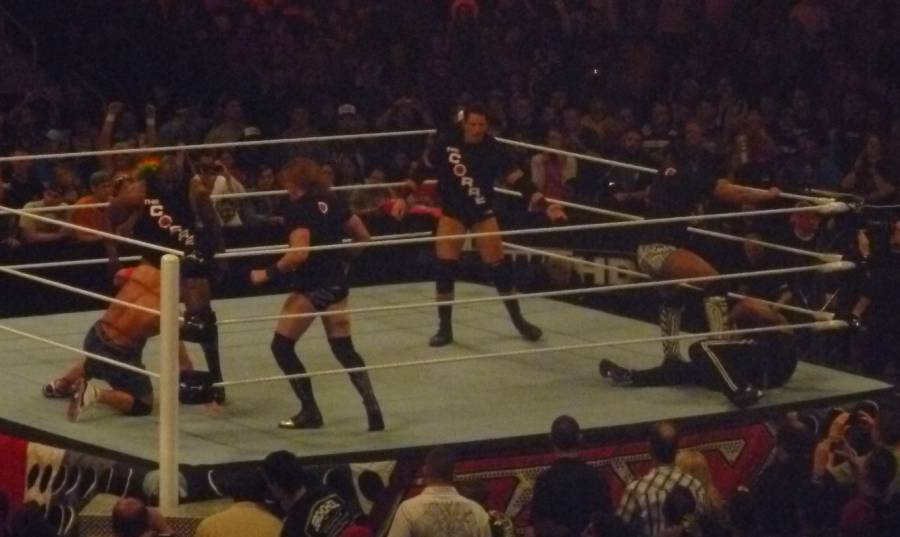
The four members of The Corre attacking John Cena and The Rock

However, the stable lost a match at WrestleMania XXVII against Big Show, Kane, Kofi Kingston, and Santino Marella in under two minutes. Gabriel and Slater lost the title on the April 22 episode of SmackDown against Big Show and Kane and were unable to regain them. Tensions within the group began to flare due to failed interference in each other's matches. On the May 6 episode of SmackDown, Jackson refused to celebrate with the rest of The Corre when he defeated Big Show, instead choosing to walk out on them after his match, thus leading to Barrett, Gabriel and Slater attacking him backstage and removing him from the group. This started a feud between Barrett and Jackson, who challenged Barrett for the Intercontinental Championship twice, but failed to win the title since he won the bouts on May 22 at Over the Limit by disqualification and on the June 3 episode of SmackDown by countout instead of a pinfall or a submission. On the June 10 episode of SmackDown, Barrett, fleeing from Jackson, walked out on Gabriel and Slater in a six-man tag team match against Jackson and The Usos (Jey and Jimmy Uso), leaving them handicapped and causing them to lose the match, after which Gabriel and Slater confronted Barrett and declared the dissolution of the faction.

== Championships and accomplishments ==
- World Wrestling Entertainment
  - WWE Intercontinental Championship (1 time) – Barrett
  - WWE Tag Team Championship (2 times) – Slater and Gabriel
