= Extreme Rules (2012) =

WWE pay-per-view event

- Promotional poster featuring Brock Lesnar and John Cena
- Promotion: WWE
- Date: April 29, 2012
- City: Rosemont, Illinois
- Venue: Allstate Arena
- Attendance: 14,817
- Buy rate: 263,000

Pay-per-view chronology
← Previous; WrestleMania XXVIII	Next → Over the Limit

Extreme Rules chronology
← Previous; 2011	Next → 2013

The 2012 Extreme Rules was a professional wrestling pay-per-view (PPV) event produced by WWE. It was the fourth annual Extreme Rules event and took place on April 29, 2012, at the Allstate Arena in the Chicago suburb of Rosemont, Illinois. The theme of the event was that it featured various hardcore-based matches. This edition was noteworthy as it included Brock Lesnar's first WWE in-ring match since WrestleMania XX in 2004.

Eight professional wrestling matches were scheduled on the event's card and one pre-show match was livestreamed on YouTube. Only four of the main card's matches were contested under a hardcore stipulation. In the main event, John Cena defeated Brock Lesnar in an Extreme Rules match. Elsewhere on the card, CM Punk defeated Chris Jericho in a Chicago Street Fight to retain the WWE Championship and Sheamus defeated Daniel Bryan in a two out of three falls match to retain the World Heavyweight Championship.

The pay-per-view received universally positive reviews, with the main event and two world championship matches drawing high praise from critics and fans. The event received 263,000 pay-per-view buys, up 25.8% from the 209,000 buys for the previous year's event, whereas the next year's event received 231,000 buys, a drop of 12.1%. This was the only WWE pay-per-view event to receive a rating of TV-14 since WWE's transition to TV-PG in July 2008 and has been ranked as one of WWE's best events ever. It was also the first Extreme Rules event held since the end of the first brand extension in August 2011.

== Production ==
=== Background ===
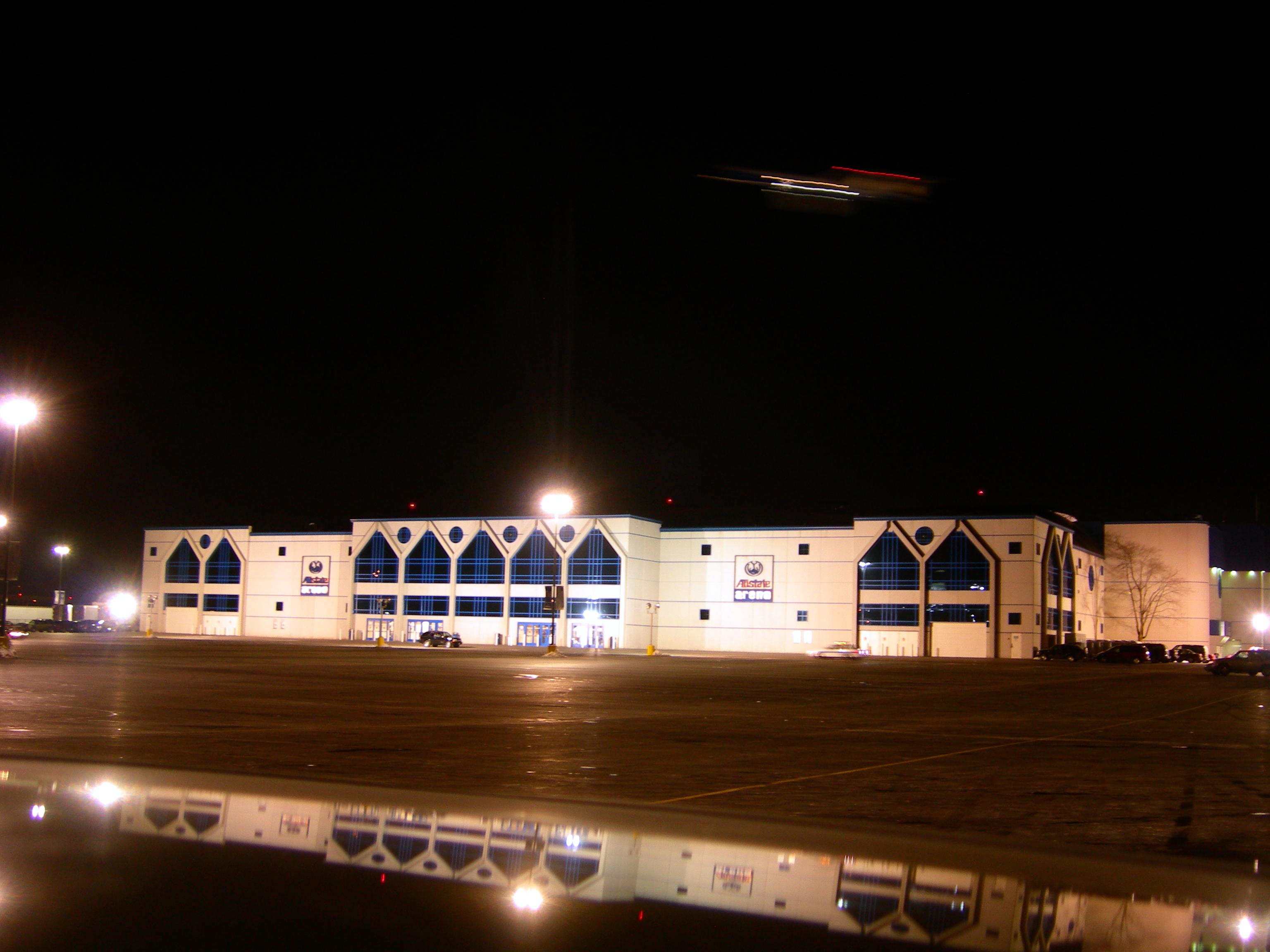
The fourth annual Extreme Rules event was held at the Allstate Arena in the Chicago suburb of Rosemont, Illinois.

Extreme Rules was an annual professional wrestling pay-per-view (PPV) event produced by WWE since 2009. The concept of the event was that it featured various matches that were contested under hardcore rules and generally featured one Extreme Rules match. The defunct Extreme Championship Wrestling promotion, which WWE acquired in 2003, originally used the "extreme rules" term to describe the regulations for all of its matches; WWE adopted the term, using it in place of "hardcore match" or "hardcore rules". The fourth Extreme Rules event was scheduled for April 29, 2012, at the Allstate Arena in the Chicago suburb of Rosemont, Illinois. Tickets went on sale on February 4 via Ticketmaster. It was the first Extreme Rules event held since the end of the first brand split in August 2011.

=== Storylines ===
The professional wrestling matches at Extreme Rules comprised professional wrestlers performing as characters in scripted events pre-determined by the hosting promotion, WWE. Storylines between the characters were produced on WWE's weekly television shows, Monday Night Raw and SmackDown.

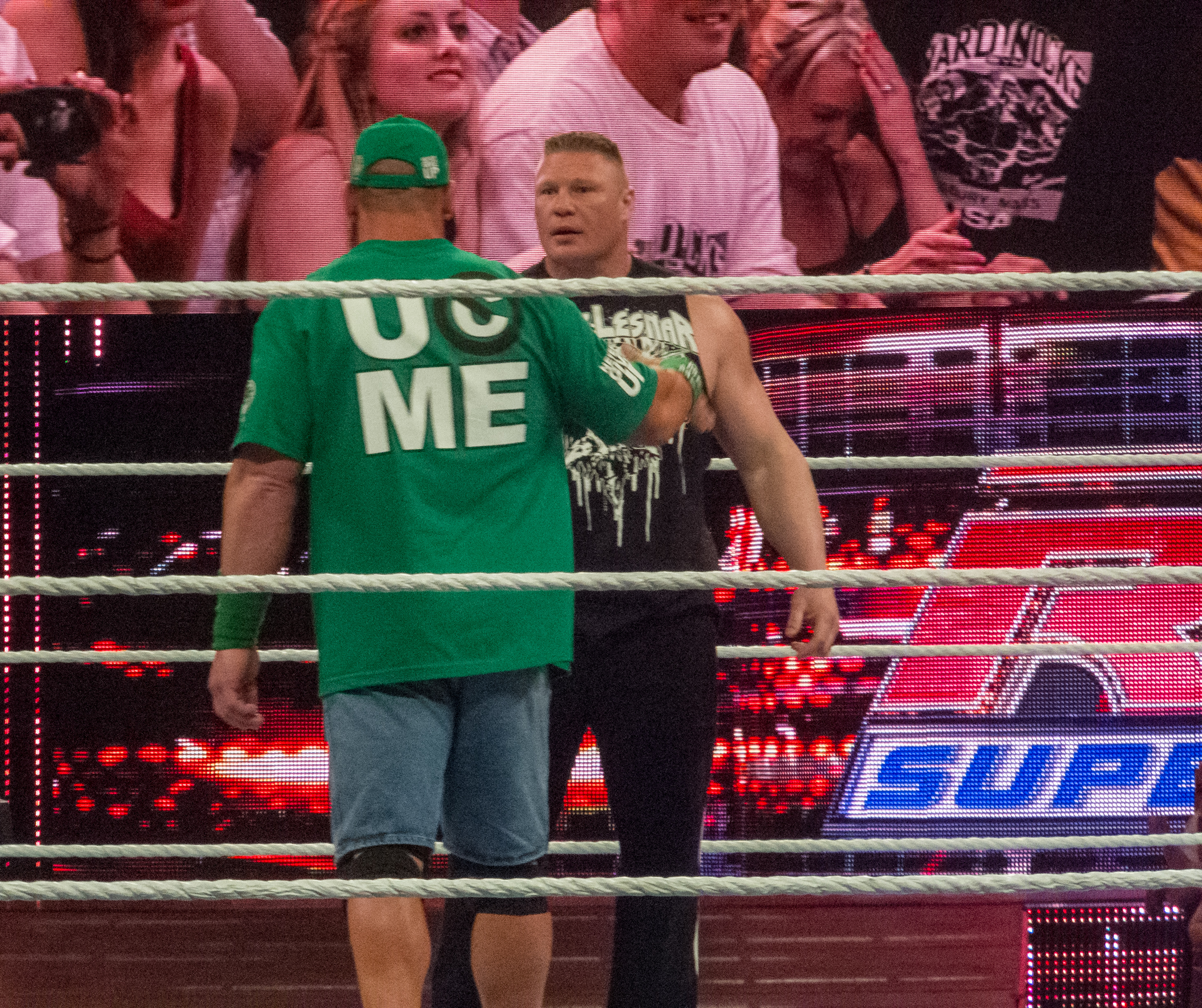
Brock Lesnar face to face with John Cena after his return in April 2012.

On the April 2 episode of Raw, John Cena spoke about his loss to The Rock the previous night at WrestleMania XXVIII, which was dubbed a once-in-a-lifetime match and the most important battle of Cena's career. Cena asked for the Rock to come out so that Cena could offer his congratulations. Instead, Brock Lesnar came into the ring, making his first WWE appearance since 2004. Lesnar offered to shake hands with Cena but instead executed the F-5, dropping Cena onto the mat. The next week, General Manager John Laurinaitis revealed that he signed Lesnar to bring "legitimacy" and for Lesnar to become the "new face of the WWE"; Laurinaitis also scheduled Lesnar to face Cena at Extreme Rules. On April 16, the match was made into an Extreme Rules match.

On the January 2 Raw, Chris Jericho returned to WWE. He made it clear that he wanted to reclaim his title as the "best wrestler in the world", which CM Punk had claimed to be since 2011. Punk defeated Jericho at WrestleMania XXVIII. In the weeks following the event, Jericho attacked Punk several times, once pouring a bottle of Jack Daniel's over him — a pointed insult to the straight edge Punk, and vowed to lead Punk "down the path to alcoholism just like his father." On the April 16 Raw, Jericho challenged Punk to a Chicago Street Fight at Extreme Rules for the WWE Championship.

At WWE's Royal Rumble pay-per-view event on January 29, Sheamus won the Royal Rumble match to earn the opportunity to face either WWE Champion CM Punk or World Heavyweight Champion Daniel Bryan for their respective titles at WrestleMania XXVIII. Sheamus elected to wrestle Bryan and defeated him in 18 seconds to win the championship. On the April 10 episode of SmackDown, Bryan invoked his rematch clause for Extreme Rules. Bryan chose a two out of three falls format to prevent Sheamus from scoring another quick victory.

Another rivalry heading into Extreme Rules was between Randy Orton and Kane. In July 2011, Kane lost in a Street Fight to Orton, and the two shook hands after the match as a sign of respect. In 2012, a newly re-masked Kane viewed the handshake as a sign of weakness, hence Kane started a feud with Orton and defeated him at WrestleMania XXVIII. Yet, on the April 6 episode of SmackDown, Orton defeated Kane in a No Disqualification match. On the April 10 episode of SmackDown, Kane attacked Orton and his father "Cowboy" Bob Orton. On the April 20 episode of SmackDown, a Falls Count Anywhere match between Kane and Orton was scheduled for Extreme Rules.

On April 23, a rematch for the WWE Intercontinental Championship was scheduled between defending champion Big Show and Cody Rhodes. Big Show had won the title from Rhodes at WrestleMania XXVIII.

Later that same day, a title defense by United States Champion Santino Marella against The Miz was scheduled for the pre-show.

Also that same day, Nikki Bella defeated Beth Phoenix to capture the Divas Championship. Phoenix was slated to receive a rematch for the title at Extreme Rules, but was not medically cleared to compete due to a (storyline) sprained left ankle, and was replaced by Layla. This was Layla's first WWE appearance since the May 13, 2011, episode of SmackDown. Layla had injured her knee at the previous year's event and had subsequently been attacked by Kharma.

== Event ==
Other on-screen personnel
Role:	Name:
English Commentators	Michael Cole
English Commentators	Booker T
English Commentators	Jerry Lawler
English Commentators	Matt Striker (pre-show only)
Spanish Commentators	Carlos Cabrera
Spanish Commentators	Marcelo Rodriguez
Backstage interviewer	Matt Striker
Ring announcers	Lilian Garcia (SmackDown)
Ring announcers	Justin Roberts (Raw)
Referees	Mike Chioda
Referees	Charles Robinson
Referees	John Cone
Referees	Justin King
Referees	Scott Armstrong
Referees	Chad Patton

=== Pre-show ===
On the pre-show, The Miz challenged Santino Marella in a singles match for the United States Championship. Before the match, Miz complained about being in the pre-show after he was in the main event at last years' event. The title match ended with Marella pinning Miz after performing the Cobra on Miz. After the match, the stipulation for the Intercontinental Championship match between champion Big Show and Cody Rhodes was determined by a wheel spin which was revealed as a tables match.

=== Preliminary matches ===
The actual pay-per-view opened with Randy Orton facing Kane in a Falls Count Anywhere match. The match started with Kane and Orton brawling into the crowd and then backstage, where Zack Ryder made an appearance to attack Kane and allow Orton to deliver an inverted headlock backbreaker for a two count. Orton and Kane eventually headed back into the ring, where Orton was unable to beat Kane despite multiple pin attempts after repeated chair shots, an elevated DDT off a broadcast table onto the arena floor and a superplex. In the end, Orton performed an RKO on Kane on a steel chair to win the match.

Next, Brodus Clay (accompanied by Hornswoggle and his background dancers, Cameron and Naomi) faced Dolph Ziggler (accompanied by Jack Swagger and Vickie Guerrero). Interference from Ziggler's tag team partner, Swagger, at ringside led to Ziggler seizing an early advantage with a leg drop bulldog and a sleeper hold. Clay then mounted a comeback; his headbutt floored an onrushing Ziggler, and Clay delivered a running splash to win the match.

After that, Big Show defended the Intercontinental Championship against Cody Rhodes in a tables match. Big Show had the upper hand early on, but Rhodes managed to escape being thrown into a table propped up in the ring corner by running up and pushing off it to deliver the Beautiful Disaster. Big Show then re-established the advantage with superior size and strength, but Rhodes later dropkicked his leg as he attempted to re-enter the ring from the outside. To regain his balance, Big Show stepped on and broke a table at ringside, thus Rhodes was declared the winner and regained the title as Big Show had gone through a table with his foot. An irate Big Show attacked Rhodes after the match.

In the fourth match, Sheamus defended the World Heavyweight Championship against Daniel Bryan in a two out of three falls match. Sheamus held the early advantage, putting Bryan in a Texas Cloverleaf and countering Bryan's flying knee off the apron by catching and tackling Bryan back-first into the barricade. Bryan then began to target Sheamus' left arm and shoulder with a hammerlock, and he repeatedly went for the "Yes" Lock, but Sheamus was able to shake him off. Bryan then sent Sheamus shoulder-first into the corner ring post, and continued to ram Sheamus into the ring post shoulder-first while outside the ring. Back in the ring, Bryan repeatedly kicked Sheamus' left arm while it was in the ropes and refused to stop at the referee's five count. The referee disqualified Bryan and awarded the first fall to Sheamus. Bryan, who intentionally disqualified himself to hurt Sheamus, immediately rushed to put the "Yes!" Lock on Sheamus, targeting the injured arm as soon the match was restarted. Sheamus soon passed out due to the "Yes!" Lock and the referee awarded the second fall to Bryan. WWE officials then tended to a dazed Sheamus, who insisted that he could continue the match, as Bryan started shouting "Yes!", prompting his fans to chant with him and his detractors in the crowd to yell "No!". When the match restarted, Bryan rushed Sheamus in the corner, but Sheamus responded with a Brogue Kick. Sheamus was slow to cover Bryan, and Bryan kicked out at two. Bryan then peppered Sheamus with kicks, and a kick to Sheamus' head got a two count. However, Bryan missed a diving headbutt and a corner dropkick, allowing Sheamus to make a comeback with double axe handles and an Irish Curse backbreaker. Sheamus finished Bryan off with a Brogue Kick to score a pinfall and win 2 falls to 1. With this victory, Sheamus retained his World Heavyweight Championship.

The fifth match featured Ryback (the former Skip Sheffield from WWE NXT who recently debuted with this gimmick earlier in the month) against Aaron Relic and Jay Hatton, two local competitors, in a 2-on-1 handicap match. Ryback performed a powerslam on Hatton, then a clothesline and a stunner on Relic. Ryback then delivered his finisher on Hatton and pinned both opponents at the same time for the dominant victory.

Next, the Chicago Street Fight for the WWE Championship was contested in which CM Punk defended his title against Chris Jericho. After weathering an initial flurry of offense from Punk, Jericho gained the edge and taunted Punk and his family. This earned Jericho a slap from Punk's sister at ringside. An aggravated Jericho went after Punk's sister, causing Punk to go into a frenzy, slamming Jericho through the top piece of the broadcast table, which had been removed and propped up against the under-structure of the table. When Jericho managed to re-establish an advantage, he taunted the straight edge Punk by pouring beer all over him. Then, Punk made a comeback and performed the Randy Savage diving elbow drop, but Jericho kicked out at two. Yet Jericho managed to block Punk's attempts at executing his finisher, the Go To Sleep, and managed to deliver a Codebreaker to Punk. Jericho then locked Punk in his finishing submission, the Walls of Jericho. Punk made it to the ropes while in the hold, but there were no rope breaks in the Street Fight format. Punk then reached under the ring, grabbed a fire extinguisher and sprayed it in Jericho's face to blind him and break the hold. Punk then executed a diving elbow drop from the top rope onto Jericho through the Spanish broadcast table, and Punk locked Jericho in the anaconda vise. Jericho broke it by striking Punk with a kendo stick. Punk then grabbed a chair and prepared to attack Jericho, but Jericho executed a Codebreaker into the chair on Punk for a nearfall. Aiming to humiliate Punk, Jericho attempted Punk's own finishing move, the Go to Sleep, however, Punk countered and catapulted Jericho into an exposed turnbuckle that Jericho himself had exposed earlier in the match. Punk finished by delivering the Go to Sleep to Jericho to retain the title. Following the match, Punk then celebrated with his WWE Championship with his hometown crowd.

Then, a backstage segment occurred where Beth Phoenix was declared not medically fit to wrestle. As a result, Divas Champion Nikki Bella would have to make her first defense of her title against a mystery opponent. The mystery opponent was revealed as Layla, who managed to counter Bella's Twin Magic switcheroo into a neckbreaker to win the title.

=== Main event match ===
The main event for the night saw the 2008 Royal Rumble Match winner, John Cena, face the 2003 Royal Rumble Match winner, Brock Lesnar, in an Extreme Rules match; this was Lesnar's first match in WWE since 2004. The match, refereed by Charles Robinson, started with Lesnar causing Cena to bleed with a vicious elbow to his head after a double leg takedown. Lesnar continued to dominate the match, delivering punches, clotheslines and knee strikes to Cena; the match had to be paused twice while a medic attended to Cena to clean up the blood. After the match restarted for the second time, Lesnar continued to brutalize Cena, hanging him from the turnbuckles and throwing him into the steel steps and the guardrail. Cena desperately went for his finishing move, the Attitude Adjustment, but Lesnar countered into his own finishing move, the F-5. While throwing Cena to the mat, however, Lesnar inadvertently caused Cena to hit and knock out the referee. By the time another referee got to the ring to make the count, Cena was able to kick out at two and Lesnar attacked the referee. Lesnar then brought the metal ring steps into the ring and put a kimura lock on Cena while on the steps causing John Cena’s left arm to be damaged. This marked the debut of Lesnar's Kimura Lock in WWE. Cena lifted and slammed Lesnar onto the metal steps to break the hold. After Lesnar avoided a Cena diving leg drop bulldog, Lesnar charged and leapt off the ring steps and over the top rope onto Cena, sending both men to the floor. When Lesnar tried the same move again, Cena countered by hitting Lesnar in the head with a metal chain, bloodying Lesnar. A re-energized Cena then delivered an Attitude Adjustment to Lesnar onto the steel steps and pinned him to win the match. Following his victory, a bloodied Cena, selling an arm injury, said that he would go home for a vacation.

== Reception ==
The event sold out the Allstate Arena with 14,817 people in attendance. The official buy total for the 2012 Extreme Rules event was 263,000, up from 209,000 for the 2011 event and 182,000 for the 2010 event, whereas the next Extreme Rules event in 2013 received 231,000 buys, a drop of 12.1%.

Extreme Rules received universally positive reviews from critics and fans. The professional wrestling section of Canoe.ca described the event as "outstanding" and "a show where all the big matches delivered in spades", rating the entire event a 9 out of 10, while also rating each of the three main events 9 out of 10.

Dave Meltzer of the Wrestling Observer Newsletter awarded out of 5 stars, 4.5 for the Cena-Lesnar match, 4 for the Bryan-Sheamus match and 3.5 stars for the Punk-Jericho match.

Benjamin Tucker of Pro Wrestling Torch rated the event 8.5 out of 10, stating that "with a solid under-card and three four-star-plus [out of five stars] matches, the show was a lot of fun to watch and had a lot of emotional highs." Tucker described the Punk-Jericho match as a "hellacious brawl that built really well and had a great emotional aspect to it". James Caldwell, also of Pro Wrestling Torch, praised the event's strong matches and performances and the "nice pace with downs to follow the big ups". Caldwell described the Cena-Lesnar main-event as "super-intense", saying that Lesnar offered "physicality not seen in years". Caldwell described the World Heavyweight Championship match as an "excellent, excellent bout" with Bryan "phenomenal in defeat" and Sheamus "looking strong headed into the next chapter of his title run". As 2012 drew to a close, Pro Wrestling Torch rated Extreme Rules as the best pay-per-view of all the WWE and TNA pay-per-views produced in that year with an average staff rating of 8.3 compared to the second best WWE PPV, WrestleMania XXVIII's 7.6 and TNA's best pay-per-view, Destination X's 7.0. The average rating across all of WWE's pay-per-views in 2012 was 6.1.

The Baltimore Sun summarized the "terrific" event being engineered by "a 'perfect storm' of a stellar Chicago crowd, excellent matches with several clever finishes, refreshing commentary and WWE rarities including violence, blood and referee assault". The Baltimore Sun also felt that "all four rematches on this card from WrestleMania exceeded their matches one month ago", while reserving special praise for Daniel Bryan and Dolph Ziggler, saying that although "Bryan doesn't hold the World Heavyweight title, he proved that he is a champion in terms of someone who can be counted on to always be one half of a fantastic match in big-stage situations", while Ziggler "made Brodus look like a million dollars in his offense".

Patrick Lennon of the Daily Star described the main-event as "compelling" while perceiving a "discrepancy" between WWE's TV-PG approach and "Lesnar elbowing Cena repeatedly in the face until he bleeds profusely".

The International Business Times rated Extreme Rules as the best pay-per-view of the year and listed both the Cena-Lesnar and Bryan-Sheamus matches in the top five WWE matches in 2012. Cena-Lesnar was described as "as brutal as anyone could have hoped for" while Bryan-Sheamus "stole the show". Bryan was also spotlighted as the "greatest in-ring performer that WWE has at the moment".

Fans also praised to the event's match quality, but raised concerns about Cena's win over Lesnar in Lesnar's first return match.

In 2013, WWE released a list of their "15 best pay-per-views ever", with 2012's Extreme Rules being ranked at #11.

Extreme Rules was released on DVD by WWE Home Video on May 29, 2012, including a DVD extra of Matt Striker interviewing CM Punk. DVD Talk gave a "Recommended" rating to the DVD, stating that the release was "right on target with other recent WWE DVDs (for better or worse), from the decent technical presentation to the lack of bonus features".

== Aftermath ==
Extreme Rules saw the culmination of most of its feuds, some of which started before the previous pay-per-view, WrestleMania XXVIII. The Cena-Lesnar, Punk-Jericho, Sheamus-Bryan, and Orton-Kane feuds ended at Extreme Rules; the only feud to continue on after the event was the Rhodes-Big Show feud, which ended before the next pay-per-view, Over the Limit.

Immediately after Extreme Rules on the April 30 Raw, WWE's Chief Operating Officer Triple H refused to give in to Brock Lesnar's unreasonable contract demands, starting a feud between the duo and resulting in Lesnar attacking Triple H and (in storyline) breaking Triple H's arm. This led to Lesnar defeating Triple H via submission at SummerSlam. At WrestleMania 29, with Triple H's career on the line, Triple H defeated Lesnar in a No Holds Barred match. The feud ended in the main event of 2013's Extreme Rules, where Lesnar (with his manager Paul Heyman's interference) defeated Triple H in a steel cage match.

Also on the April 30 Raw, General Manager John Laurinaitis, unhappy that his hand-picked star Lesnar lost to Cena at Extreme Rules, revealed himself to be Cena's next opponent for Over the Limit. In the storyline, WWE's board of directors declared that as a condition of the match, if Laurinaitis lost, he would be fired, and any wrestler who interfered would be fired. At Over the Limit, Laurinaitis defeated Cena after Big Show interfered on Laurinaitis' behalf. Big Show was free to interfere in the match because he had already been fired the week before Over the Limit by Laurinaitis after he mocked Laurinaitis' speech mannerisms.

To determine the #1 contendership for CM Punk's WWE Championship, a Beat the Clock Challenge was held on the April 30 Raw. A series of five singles matches took place where the victor with the lowest match-time was deemed the overall winner; Daniel Bryan set the fastest time by defeating Jerry Lawler in under three minutes. Notably, during the Beat-the-Clock challenge, The Miz avenged his loss to Santino Marella by defeating Marella in a non-title match. Marella eventually lost the United States Championship in August to Antonio Cesaro at SummerSlam.

At Over the Limit, Punk retained his title in controversial fashion when Bryan rolled back onto his shoulders as he applied the "Yes!" Lock on Punk, Punk tapped out immediately after the referee counted a pinfall win for Punk. Punk would continue to hold the WWE Championship until January 2013 when he was defeated by The Rock at the Royal Rumble, a title reign of 434 days.

Before Extreme Rules, Alberto Del Rio defeated World Heavyweight Champion Sheamus via disqualification on the April 6 SmackDown to earn a future title shot. After Extreme Rules on the May 7 Raw, Sheamus and Randy Orton faced Del Rio and Chris Jericho, with Sheamus accidentally delivering a Brogue Kick to Orton followed by Jericho hitting the Codebreaker on Sheamus and pinning him. Orton then gave Sheamus an RKO after the match. Due to this, the World Heavyweight Championship match at Over the Limit was made a fatal four-way match. Sheamus pinned Jericho at Over the Limit to retain his title. Sheamus remained as World Heavyweight Champion until October 2012, where he lost his title to Big Show at Hell in a Cell.

Cody Rhodes' feud with Big Show continued after Extreme Rules, ending on the May 7 Raw when Show defeated Rhodes in a title match via count-out, but this meant Rhodes retained the title. At Over the Limit, Christian made his surprise return after a month's absence from injury and won a battle royal to earn an Intercontinental Championship opportunity later that night; Rhodes lost the match and the title to Christian.

After Nikki Bella lost the Divas Championship to Layla at Extreme Rules, both Bella Twins (Nikki and Brie) received a title shot in a triple threat match on the following episode of Raw. Layla won the match quickly and the Bella Twins were "fired" from WWE (in actuality, the twins' contracts expired). Layla moved on to feud with Beth Phoenix, whom she beat at Over the Limit to retain her title. Layla remained Divas Champion until September 2012, where she lost her title to Eve at Night of Champions.

After Extreme Rules, both Brodus Clay and Ryback's winning streaks continued through Raw and SmackDown into Over the Limit as Clay defeated The Miz while Ryback defeated Camacho. Clay's streak ended at 24 wins on the June 25 Raw with a loss to Big Show. Ryback's streak ended at 38 wins in October 2012 at Hell in a Cell with a loss to CM Punk. Meanwhile, Dolph Ziggler and Jack Swagger moved on to feud with Tag Team Champions Kofi Kingston and R-Truth but would fail to win their titles.

== Results ==
No.	Results	Stipulations	Times
1^{P}	Santino Marella (c) defeated The Miz by pinfall	Singles match for the WWE United States Championship	5:00
2	Randy Orton defeated Kane by pinfall	Falls Count Anywhere match	16:45
3	Brodus Clay (with Cameron, Hornswoggle, and Naomi) defeated Dolph Ziggler (with Jack Swagger and Vickie Guerrero) by pinfall	Singles match	4:17
4	Cody Rhodes defeated Big Show (c)	Tables match for the WWE Intercontinental Championship	4:37
5	Sheamus (c) defeated Daniel Bryan 2–1	Two out of three falls match for the World Heavyweight Championship	22:55
6	Ryback defeated Aaron Relic and Jay Hatton by pinfall	Handicap match	1:51
7	CM Punk (c) defeated Chris Jericho by pinfall	Chicago Street Fight for the WWE Championship	25:15
8	Layla defeated Nikki Bella (c) (with Brie Bella) by pinfall	Singles match for the WWE Divas Championship	2:45
9	John Cena defeated Brock Lesnar by pinfall	Extreme Rules match	17:43
(c) / – the champion(s) heading into the match; P / – the match was broadcast on the pre-show
