= WrestleMania XXVIII =

2012 WWE pay-per-view event

- Promotional poster featuring John Cena (left) and The Rock (right)
- Promotion: WWE
- Date: April 1, 2012
- City: Miami Gardens, Florida
- Venue: Sun Life Stadium
- Attendance: 78,363
- Buy rate: 1,300,000
- Tagline: Once in a Lifetime

Pay-per-view chronology
← Previous; Elimination Chamber	Next → Extreme Rules

WrestleMania chronology
← Previous; XXVII	Next → 29

WrestleMania XXVIII was a 2012 professional wrestling pay-per-view (PPV) event produced by WWE. It was the 28th annual WrestleMania and took place on April 1, 2012, at Sun Life Stadium in Miami Gardens, Florida. This was the first WrestleMania held following the end of the original brand extension in August 2011 as well as the first WrestleMania held to be promoted under the company's shortened trade name of WWE, as following WrestleMania XXVII the prior year in April 2011, the company ceased using its full name of World Wrestling Entertainment, although that remains the legal name of the company.

There were eight matches on the event's card and one pre-show match that was streamed on YouTube. The main event saw The Rock defeat John Cena and was advertised a year in advance, being set up in the main event of the previous year's WrestleMania XXVII. In other prominent matches, The Undertaker defeated Triple H in a Hell in a Cell match with Shawn Michaels serving as the special guest referee, CM Punk defeated Chris Jericho to retain the WWE Championship, Big Show defeated Cody Rhodes to win the WWE Intercontinental Championship, and in the opening bout, Sheamus defeated Daniel Bryan to win the World Heavyweight Championship in an 18-second match.

The Rock vs. John Cena match was re-broadcast on August 25, 2012, on NBC and later issued on DVD and Blu-ray, collected under the title of The Rock vs John Cena: Once in a Lifetime. The match was later included in WWE Best PPV Matches of 2012 as the "Most Anticipated WrestleMania Match of All Time". Despite the "Once in a Lifetime" tagline, the two would wrestle each other again in the main event of the following year's WrestleMania 29, with Cena emerging victorious and winning the WWE Championship from The Rock.

== Production ==
=== Background ===
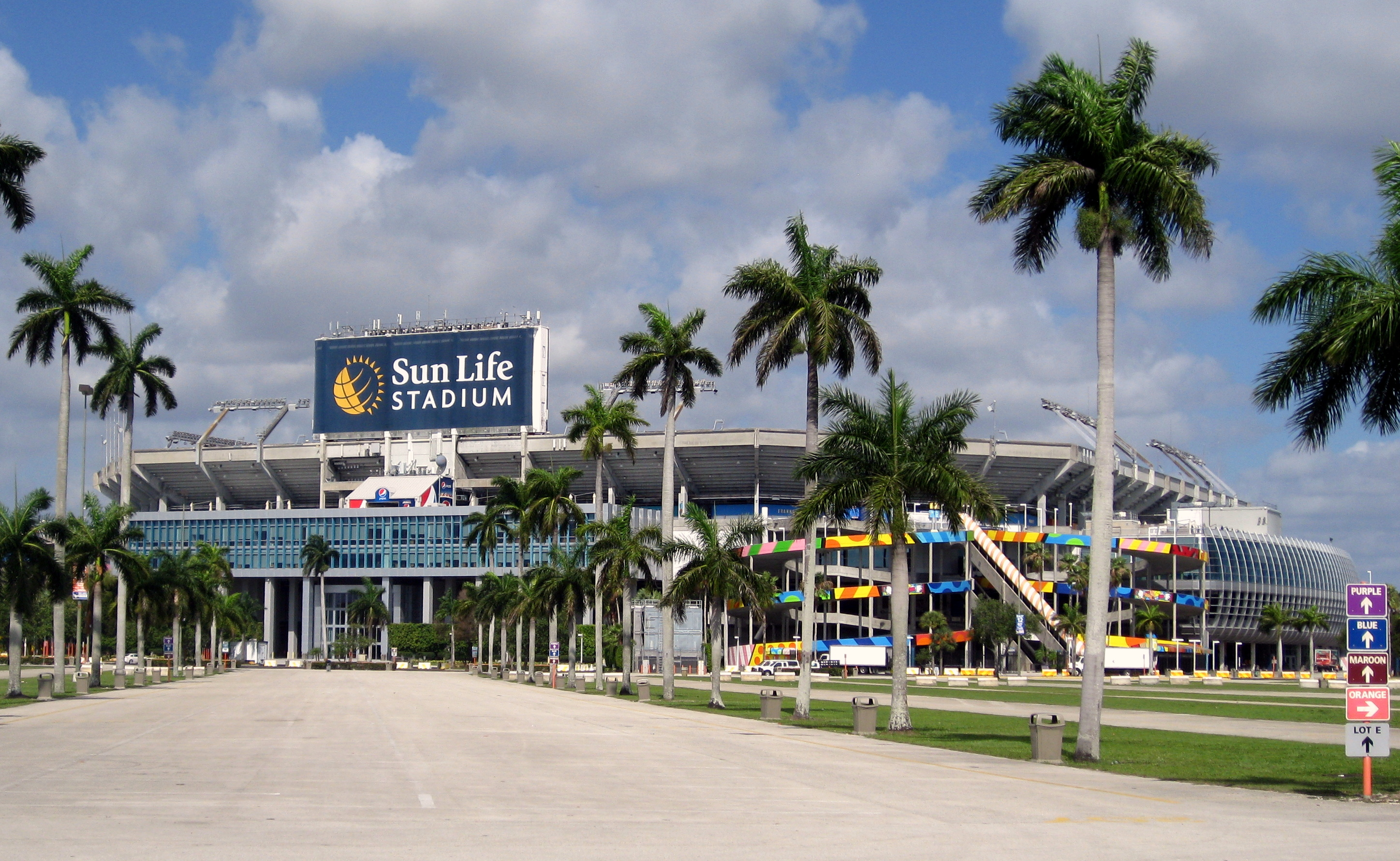
The 28th annual WrestleMania was held at Sun Life Stadium in Miami Gardens, Florida.

WrestleMania is considered WWE's flagship professional wrestling pay-per-view (PPV) event, having first been held in 1985. It is the longest-running professional wrestling event in history and is held annually between mid-March to mid-April. It was the first of WWE's original four pay-per-views, which includes Royal Rumble, SummerSlam, and Survivor Series, referred to as the "Big Four".

The city of Miami Gardens, Florida was one of the two major contenders to host WrestleMania XXVII along with Atlanta, Georgia; in February 2010, Atlanta was awarded the right to host the event. According to the Miami-Dade Sports Commission, WWE management felt that Miami's planning for the event would have been too hectic with many other sporting events held in the area around the same time of the planning, such as Super Bowl XLIV. However, the Miami area was reportedly considered for the next event due to its international ties, facilities, airports, and experience of hosting previous major events.

Bidding documents were sent to 17 cities in consideration for hosting a WrestleMania event between 2012 and 2014, with 14 replying in interest. Other cities under consideration for WrestleMania XXVIII included Los Angeles, California, New Orleans, Louisiana, New York City, New York, Toronto, Ontario, Canada, Detroit, Michigan, Tampa, Florida, Vancouver, British Columbia, Canada, St. Louis, Missouri, Jacksonville, Florida, Orlando, Florida, and Houston, Texas. The city of Dallas, Texas also showed interest, but had to withdraw from bidding for the next two years due to hosting events such as the NCAA Final Four.

Miami was revealed as the site of WrestleMania on February 9, 2011, by The Miami Herald and at a WWE press conference at the Fontainebleau Miami Beach. The event was scheduled to be held on April 1, 2012, at Miami Gardens' Sun Life Stadium. WrestleMania XXVIII was the second WrestleMania event that was hosted in the U.S. state of Florida, the fourth open-air event, and the third event to be held entirely outdoors. For hosting the event, WWE received a $250,000 cash incentive from the Miami-Dade Sports Commission, raised through grants and sponsorships. Along with WrestleMania XXVIII, a series of events grouped as "WrestleMania Week" was held in the week preceding the event including WrestleMania's annual WrestleMania Axxess fan convention at the Miami Beach Convention Center, the 2012 WWE Hall of Fame ceremony at the American Airlines Arena, the finals of the WrestleMania Reading Challenge, and a Celebrity Pro-Am Golf tournament.

This was the first WrestleMania to be held following the end of the first brand extension in August 2011. It was also the first WrestleMania held to be promoted under the company's shortened trade name of WWE, as following WrestleMania XXVII the previous year in April 2011, the company ceased using its full name of World Wrestling Entertainment, although that remains the legal name of the company.

=== Storylines ===
The event included matches that resulted from scripted storylines. Results were predetermined by WWE's writers, while storylines were produced on WWE's weekly television shows, Monday Night Raw and SmackDown.

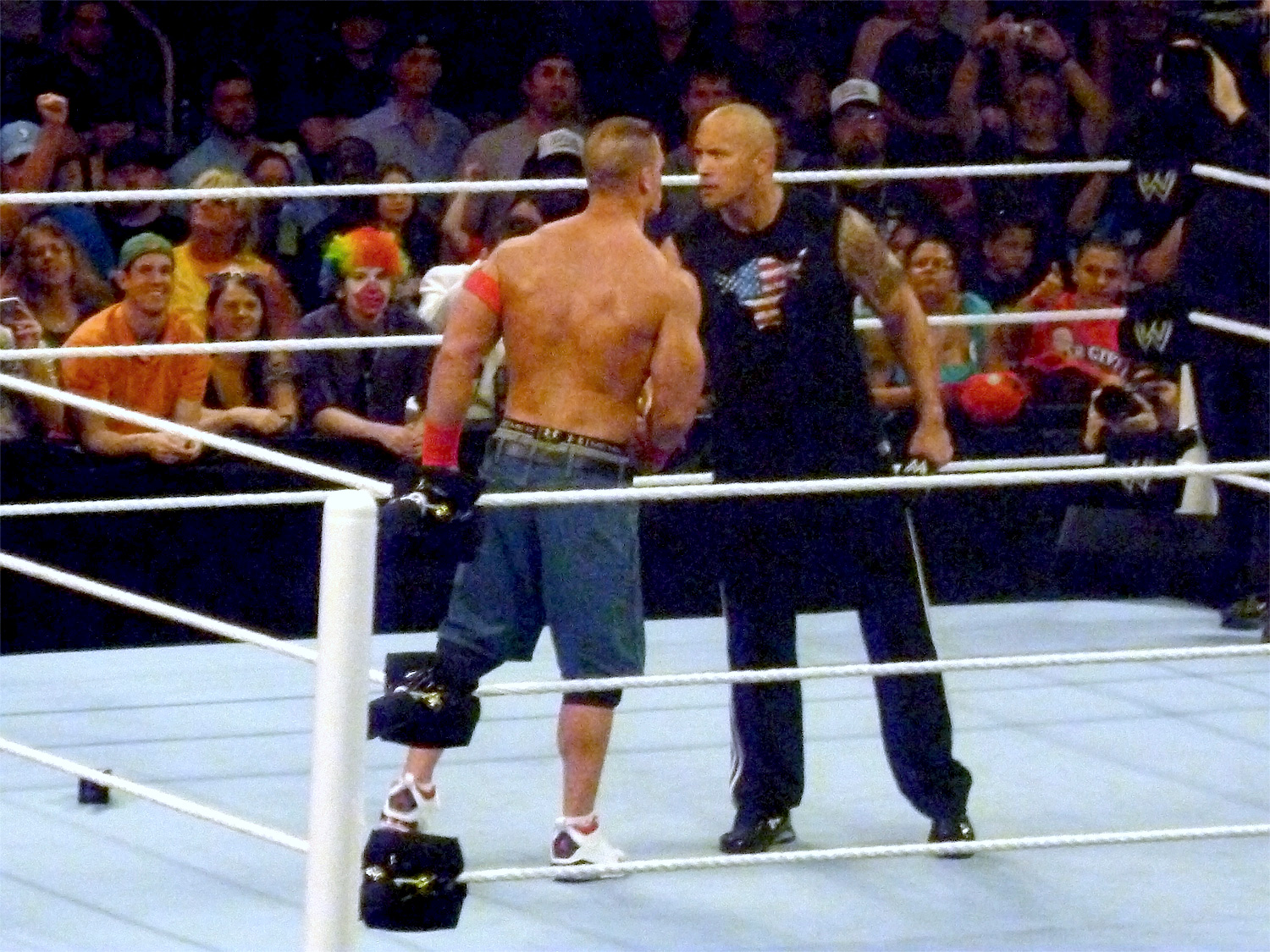
John Cena (left) and The Rock (right) agree to fight at WrestleMania XXVIII.

The main event of WrestleMania XXVIII pitted The Rock wrestling against John Cena, billed as a Once in a Lifetime, face of the company generational match. On the February 14, 2011, episode of Raw, The Rock was revealed as the host of WrestleMania XXVII, and upon his return to WWE, began a feud with John Cena (and Cena's opponent at that WrestleMania, then-WWE Champion, The Miz), which continued for weeks in terms of verbal insults, until the March 28 episode of Raw, where Cena delivered the Attitude Adjustment to The Rock after he fended off attacks from The Miz and his protégé, Alex Riley. At WrestleMania XXVII, The Rock got involved in the main event WWE Championship match between The Miz and Cena, which initially ended in a double count-out. After the match was restarted under no disqualifications, no count-outs rules, The Rock delivered a Rock Bottom to Cena as a measure of payback, thus enabling The Miz to win the match. The next night on Raw, Cena challenged The Rock to a one-on-one match; The Rock accepted and proposed that it be held at WrestleMania XXVIII. After winning the championship from The Miz at Extreme Rules, Cena interrupted The Rock's birthday celebrations during the May 2 episode of Raw to announce his intention to defend the WWE Championship against The Rock at WrestleMania XXVIII. Such intentions were however thwarted by Cena losing the title at Money in the Bank in July. At Survivor Series in November, Cena teamed with The Rock (who wrestled his first WWE match in almost eight years, last competing at WrestleMania XX in 2004). Billed as "the most charismatic tag team", they defeated The Miz and R-Truth. After the match, Rock performed a Rock Bottom to Cena.

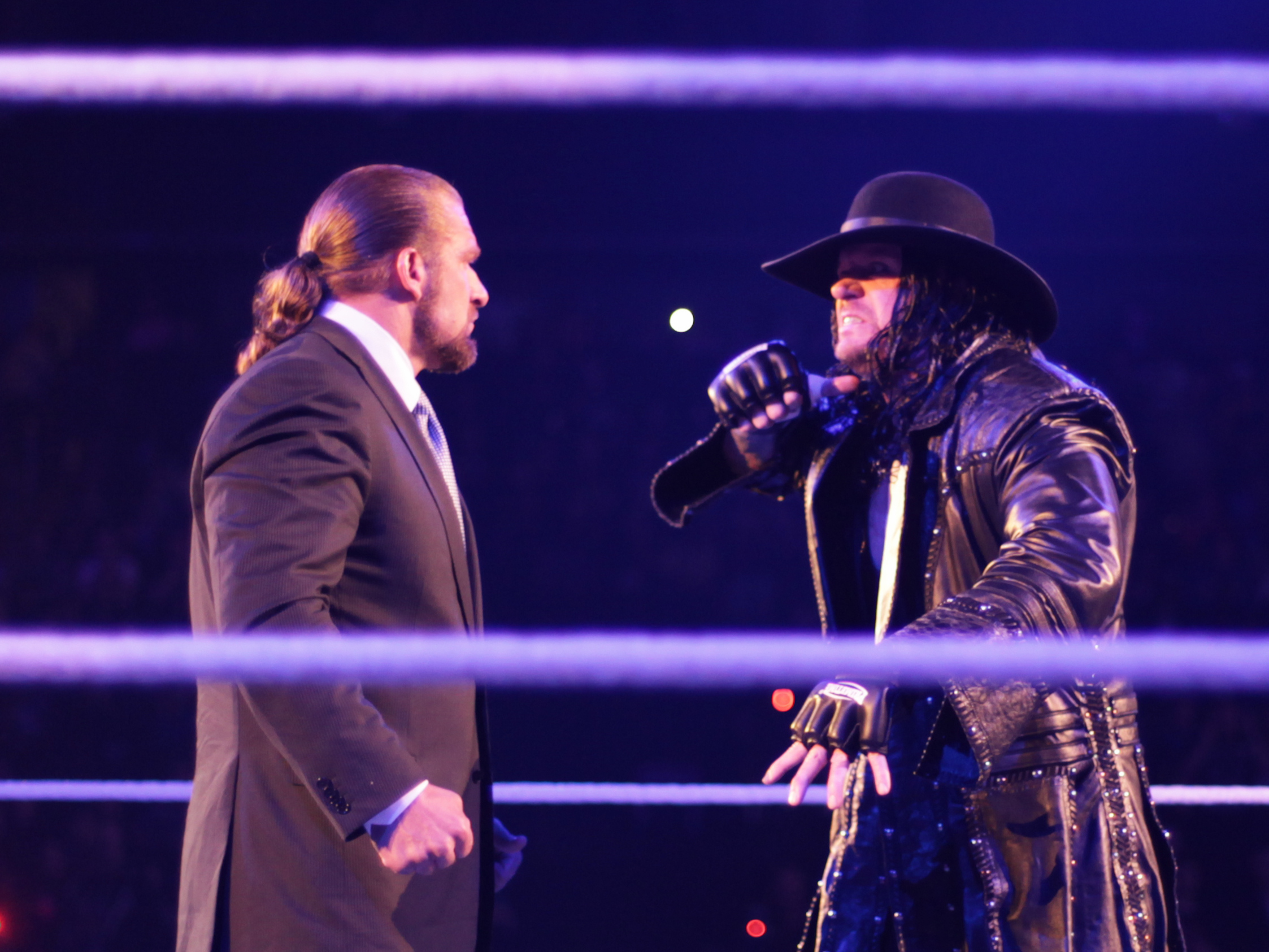
WWE Chief Operating Officer Triple H being taunted by The Undertaker ahead of their second consecutive WrestleMania match

Another match billed as the "end of an era", saw The Undertaker face Triple H in a Hell in a Cell match. The previous year at WrestleMania XXVII, in a No Holds Barred match, The Undertaker defeated Triple H via submission, in their second encounter at a WrestleMania (the first being at WrestleMania X-Seven in 2001, where The Undertaker won as well). However, in the post-match events, due to the harsh physicality suffered during the bout, The Undertaker, for the first time in his career, was carted away from the Georgia Dome by the medical staff on a stretcher. After a near ten-month long hiatus, The Undertaker returned on the January 30, 2012, episode of Raw, confronting and challenging Triple H to a rematch at WrestleMania XXVIII. The Undertaker, having been dissatisfied of his post-WrestleMania match scenario the previous year, stated that he "did not want 'that scene' to be a lasting memory" of him and was willing to give Triple H "another chance at immortality". After Triple H refused to accept the challenge the next week, his close friend and WWE Hall of Famer Shawn Michaels appeared on the February 13 episode to instigate him in accepting The Undertaker's challenge, which was in vain as Triple H stated he was willing to put his ego and personal agendas aside for the future of WWE, and viewed The Undertaker's 19–0 undefeated WrestleMania streak as a "brand" to cash-in for the company, finally ending the argument saying he would not be the one to end it. Then, on the February 20 episode, The Undertaker still remained adamant in getting a WrestleMania rematch with Triple H, going so far as to label Triple H as a "coward", and comparing his abilities and career to that of Shawn Michaels. Enraged by these comments, Triple H finally accepted The Undertaker's challenge at WrestleMania XXVIII, saying that if "he [Undertaker] wanted an end, they would go all the way", and proposed that they would compete in a Hell in a Cell match. On the March 5 episode, Michaels confronted Triple H again; Michaels expressed his views on who was better than the other, predicted Triple H's chances of defeating The Undertaker, and revealed himself as the special guest referee in their Hell in a Cell match at WrestleMania.

On July 17, 2011, at the Money in the Bank event, Daniel Bryan won the SmackDown Money in the Bank ladder match. On the July 22 episode of SmackDown, Bryan declared his intentions of cashing-in his Money in the Bank contract at WrestleMania XXVIII. However, he apparently cashed-in his contract briefcase on the November 25 episode of SmackDown and pinned the reigning World Heavyweight Champion Mark Henry to supposedly win the title and began to celebrate, but SmackDown General Manager Theodore Long informed Bryan that Henry was not medically cleared to compete, and declared the match void, thereby returning the briefcase to Bryan and the title back to Henry. The next week on Raw, Bryan acknowledged that he went back on his word, saying that headlining WrestleMania was his dream and that his "plans changed"; that the briefcase "doesn't guarantee [him] anything", since he could be put out of action at any time. WWE continued to maintain the advertisement for WrestleMania, until Bryan successfully cashed in his Money in the Bank contract briefcase on Big Show at the TLC: Tables, Ladders & Chairs event on December 18, 2011, to become the new World Heavyweight Champion. In January 2012, at the twenty-fifth annual Royal Rumble pay-per-view, Sheamus won the thirty-man Royal Rumble match, giving him the right to challenge either the WWE Champion or the World Heavyweight Champion at WrestleMania XXVIII. At Elimination Chamber in February, Sheamus attacked Bryan, after Bryan successfully retained his World Heavyweight Championship in an Elimination Chamber match, thus challenging Bryan for his title at WrestleMania.

In another match, CM Punk defended the WWE Championship against Chris Jericho. Since regaining the title at Survivor Series in November 2011, Punk had successfully defended the WWE Championship several times, calling himself the "best wrestler in the world". On the January 2, 2012, episode of Raw, after extensive hype through several viral vignettes proclaiming the "end of the world as we know it" on that day, Chris Jericho returned to WWE after over a year, and established a villainous persona over the next several weeks. On the February 13 episode of Raw, Jericho accused Punk in an in-ring segment of being a copycat of him, and that Punk stole his proclamation of being the "best in the world". While competing in the Elimination Chamber match for the WWE Championship at the Elimination Chamber pay-per-view, Jericho was knocked out by a kick to the head by Punk, rendering him unable to compete any further, and Punk went on to win that match and retain the title. This incident further fueled Jericho's animosity towards Punk. On the February 20 episode of Raw, Jericho won a ten-man battle royal to determine the number-one contender to face Punk for the WWE Championship at WrestleMania XXVIII. In subsequent promos, both wrestlers expressed their desire to prove who is "the best in the world".

Another title match scheduled was for the Intercontinental Championship between defending champion Cody Rhodes and Big Show. Their feud gained increased momentum week after week when, over January and February 2012, Rhodes began mocking Big Show's less than stellar performances at WrestleMania over the years, calling him "a reverse Undertaker" (a direct reference to The Undertaker's undefeated 19–0 record at WrestleMania, compared to Big Show's 3–8 record), in addition to citing the "ridiculous nature" of some of his matches, such as his Sumo match against Akebono at WrestleMania 21 in 2005 and a No Disqualification match against Floyd Mayweather Jr. at WrestleMania XXIV in 2008, both of which Big Show lost. Rhodes also cost Big Show a chance at the World Heavyweight Championship, by eliminating him from the Elimination Chamber match at the Elimination Chamber pay-per-view in February, and a shot at the WWE Championship at WrestleMania, when he pulled Big Show over the top rope, aiding in his elimination by Chris Jericho in the end of a number-one contender's battle royal on the February 20 episode of Raw. On the March 2 episode of SmackDown, General Manager Theodore Long scheduled a match between Rhodes and Big Show for the Intercontinental Championship at WrestleMania XXVIII, where Big Show vowed "to win at all costs."

At the Elimination Chamber pay-per-view in February 2012, John Laurinaitis, WWE's Executive Vice President of Talent Relations and Interim Raw General Manager, expressed his desire to become the permanent general manager of both Raw and SmackDown. Alberto Del Rio, Mark Henry, and Christian all came out and voiced their support for Laurinaitis over SmackDown General Manager Theodore Long, who later that night put forth his own claim to run both shows. On the February 21 episode of SmackDown, the two General Managers got into an argument following a match between WWE Champion CM Punk and World Heavyweight Champion Daniel Bryan that ended in a draw. The two were then given the chance by the WWE Board of Directors to run the other show for one night in order for the Board to evaluate them, with Long running the March 5 episode of Raw and Laurinaitis in charge of the March 9 episode of SmackDown. But being still not convinced of either man's decision-making, on March 12, the Board of Directors scheduled a 12-man tag team match for WrestleMania XXVIII, with the stipulation that the General Manager of the winning team being awarded stewardship of both Raw and SmackDown. The same night on Raw, Long appointed his assistant, Santino Marella to be the captain of his team, while Laurinaitis appointed his legal counsel, David Otunga to be his team's captain, naming Mark Henry as the first member of his team. Over the following weeks, R-Truth, Kofi Kingston, Zack Ryder, The Great Khali, and Booker T were added to Team Teddy, with Hornswoggle serving as the team's mascot, while Christian, Dolph Ziggler, Jack Swagger, and The Miz joined Team Johnny. Christian, who had joined the team in return for Laurinaitis promising him a shot at the World Heavyweight Championship after WrestleMania, was forced to leave the team due to being (kayfabe) injured by CM Punk on the March 26 episode of Raw (the real reason being Christian not having fully recovered from his real-life ankle injury) and was replaced by Drew McIntyre.

Another match scheduled for WrestleMania was between Divas Beth Phoenix and Eve Torres taking on the team of Kelly Kelly and Extra co-host Maria Menounos. The feud between Phoenix and Menounos began on the October 12, 2009, episode of Raw when Menounos accompanied then-Access Hollywood host Nancy O'Dell, who was the guest host of Raw that night. Phoenix, angered over having been traded to the SmackDown brand by O'Dell, barged into their office and got into a confrontation with both women, leading to a Six-Diva tag team match later that night in which Menounos' team defeated Phoenix's team. On the 2011 edition of Tribute to the Troops, Menounos made an appearance, this time in an Eight-Diva tag team match, winning the match for her team by pinning Phoenix. Kelly and Eve, on the other hand, had a falling apart of their friendship after Eve turned villainous and admitted to having used Zack Ryder and John Cena to further her own career. On the March 15 episode of Extra, Phoenix and Eve interrupted an interview between Kelly and Menounos, which resulted in a confrontation. Phoenix would then challenge Menounos to a match at WrestleMania, which the latter accepted. Later that night, WWE officials sanctioned a tag team match pitting Phoenix and Eve against Menounos and Kelly for WrestleMania XXVIII.

Another rivalry heading into WrestleMania was between Randy Orton and Kane. On the March 2 episode of SmackDown, Kane interrupted Orton's match against Daniel Bryan, causing Orton to lose via count-out. The two men ensued in a brawl, which ended with Kane performing a chokeslam on Orton to "welcome [Orton] back" from being injured at the hands of Bryan a few weeks ago. Orton retaliated on the March 5 episode of Raw, by delivering an RKO to Kane after Kane's match. On the March 9 episode of SmackDown, Orton and Kane once again brawled at the end of the show with no man appearing to gain an advantage. The next week on SmackDown, when Orton demanded Kane to explain the root cause of his attacks on him, the latter referred to his handshake with Orton after a Street Fight on the July 22, 2011 episode of SmackDown, in which Orton had defeated him. Kane, explaining that the handshake made him look weak and "human", that this "wretched" self was now gone, and now wanted to eliminate that memory, challenging Orton at WrestleMania XXVIII.

On March 30, a triple threat tag team match for the Tag Team Championship was scheduled between the defending champions Primo and Epico, The Usos (Jey Uso and Jimmy Uso), and the newly formed team of Justin Gabriel and Tyson Kidd. This match would be streamed online free before the pay-per-view on both WWE.com and the official WWE YouTube channel.

== Event ==
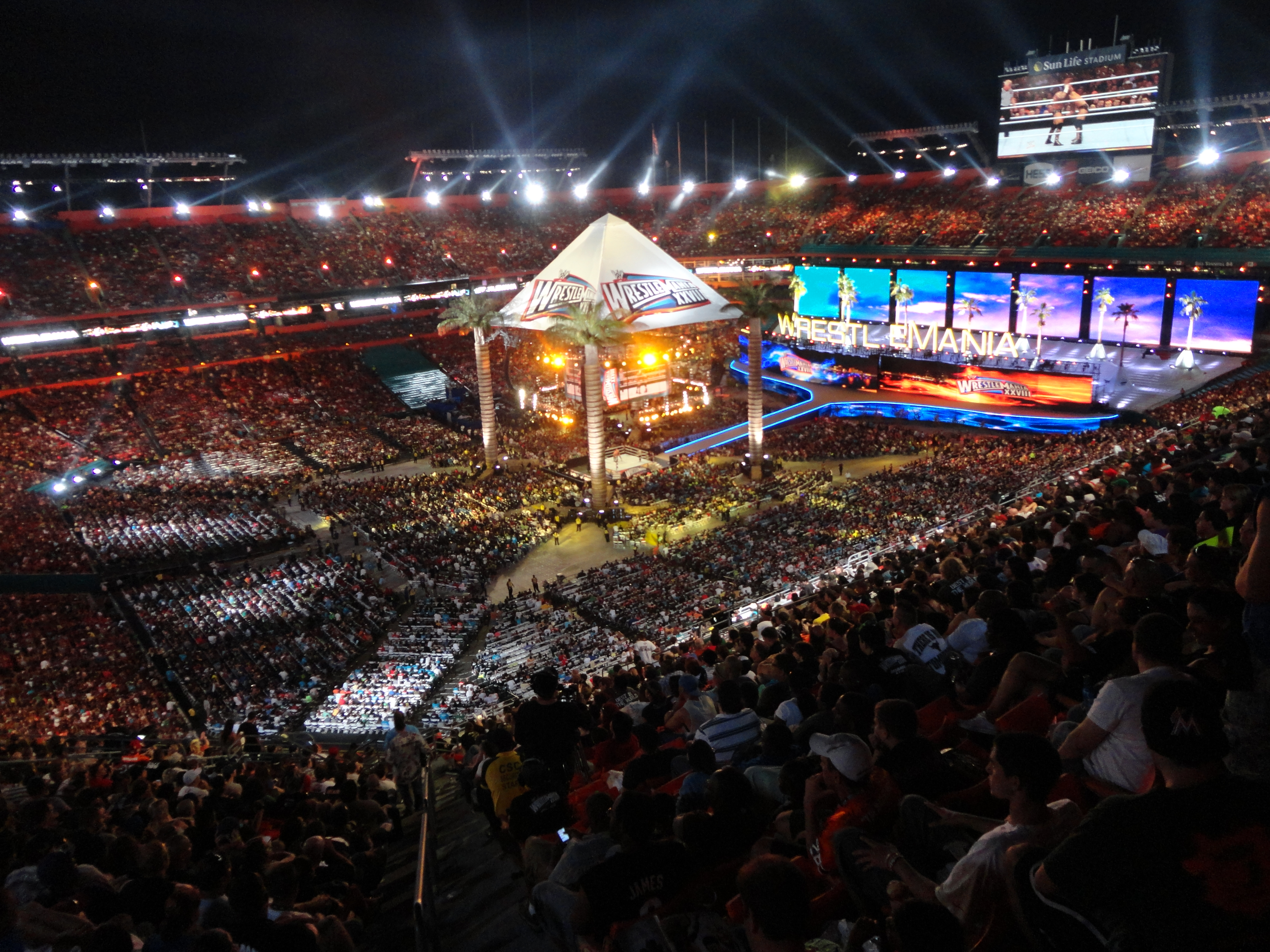
A record of 78,363 fans at Sun Life Stadium for WrestleMania XXVIII

Other on-screen personnel
Role:	Name:
English commentators	Michael Cole
English commentators	Jerry Lawler
English commentators	Jim Ross (Hell in a Cell)
Spanish commentators	Carlos Cabrera
Spanish commentators	Marcelo Rodriguez
Interviewers	Josh Mathews
Interviewers	Matt Striker
Ring announcers	Tony Chimel
Ring announcers	Howard Finkel
Ring announcers	Justin Roberts
Referees	Scott Armstrong
Referees	Mike Chioda
Referees	John Cone
Referees	Jack Doan
Referees	Justin King
Referees	Shawn Michaels (Hell in a Cell)
Referees	Chad Patton
Referees	Charles Robinson

=== Pre-show ===
A non-televised triple threat tag team match for the WWE Tag Team Championship pitted champions Primo and Epico, The Usos (Jey Uso and Jimmy Uso), and Justin Gabriel and Tyson Kidd against each other. The match began with multiple aerial tactics and many pin attempts. In the midst of the match, Justin Gabriel botched a dive outside resulting in an elbow injury. The match ended when Epico hit Jey Uso with a Backstabber and pinned him to retain the titles.

=== Preliminary matches ===
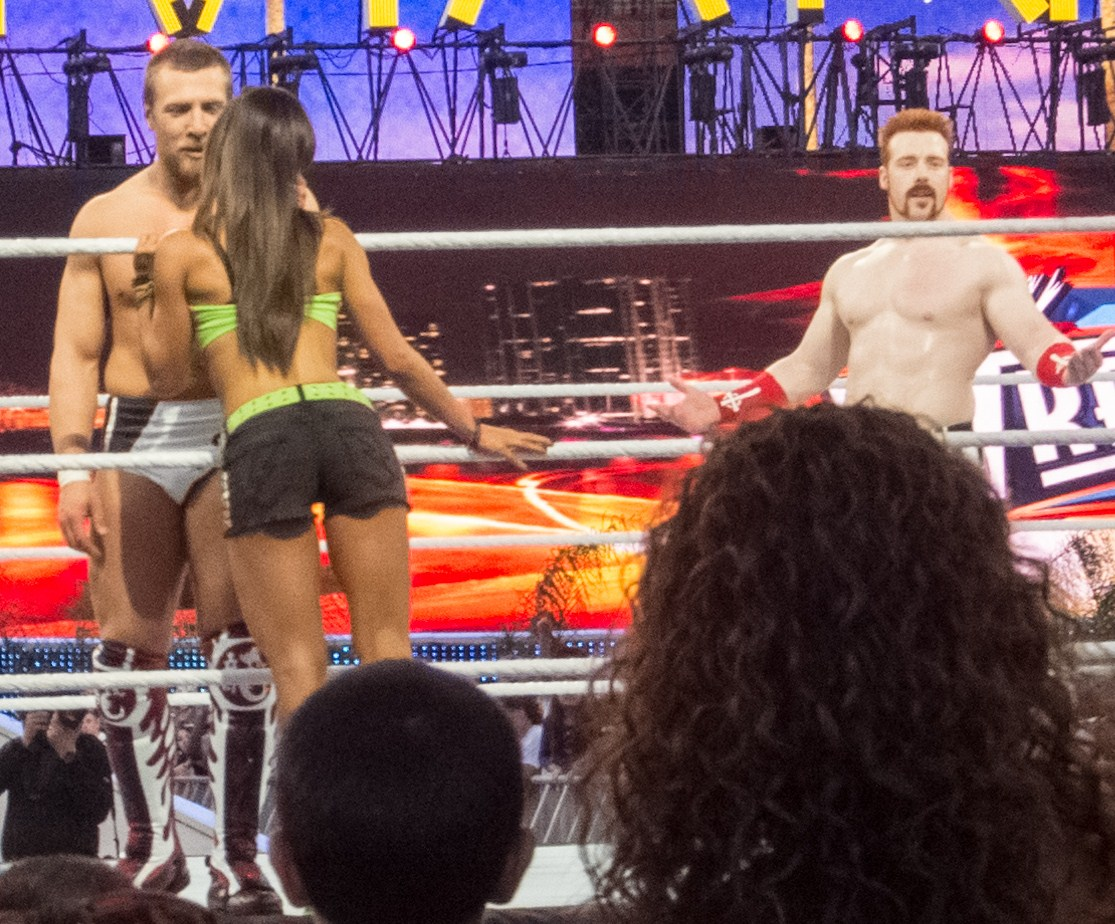
The "Kiss of Death" between Daniel Bryan and AJ Lee, which cost Bryan his World Heavyweight Championship to Sheamus in an 18-second match

In the first televised match, Daniel Bryan defended the World Heavyweight Championship against Sheamus. After receiving a good luck kiss from his (kayfabe) girlfriend AJ Lee, Bryan was surprised by Sheamus, who delivered a Brogue Kick and pinned him to win the title. Lasting only 18 seconds, this was one of the shortest title matches in WWE history.

In the second match, Randy Orton faced Kane. After trading moves back and forth, Orton gained the upper hand until Kane made a comeback. Kane continued to dominate the match until Orton kicked out of a chokeslam. Orton gained back momentum but after attempting an RKO from the second rope, Kane delivered a Chokeslam off the second rope and pinned him to win the match.

Next, the Intercontinental Championship was on the line between champion Cody Rhodes and Big Show. Rhodes attempted to avoid his opponent until Big Show caught him and tossed him back inside. Big Show dominated from there with vicious attacks. Rhodes managed to deliver a disaster kick. As he went for another one, he took a spear mid-air to the groin from Big Show. Big Show knocked out Rhodes with a Knockout Punch and pinned him to win his first Intercontinental Championship.

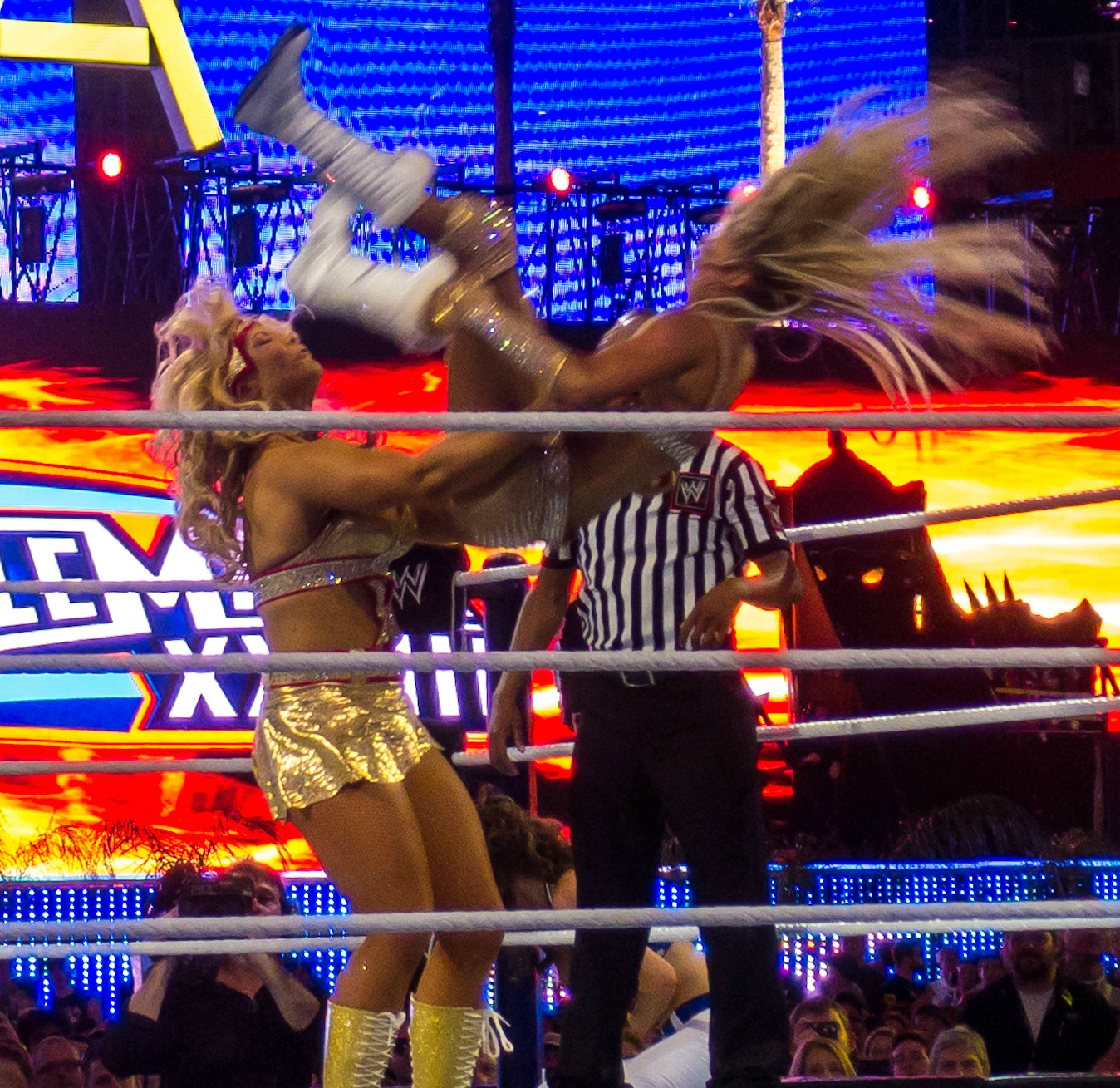
Kelly Kelly performing a Molly-Go-Round on Beth Phoenix

A tag team match pitted Kelly Kelly and Extra correspondent Maria Menounos against Beth Phoenix and Eve. Kelly began to get the upper hand over Eve. Kelly tagged in Menounos who got off to a good start but was slowed down by interference from Phoenix. Phoenix and Eve would continue to wear down Menounos who had already suffered two cracked ribs prior to the event. Menounos eventually tagged in Kelly who began to dominate. Phoenix managed to wear down Kelly but Kelly countered a Glam Slam with a bulldog and tagged in Menounos. The climax of the match came when Kelly saved Menounos, knocked Phoenix into Eve on the apron, and Menounos rolled up Phoenix for the win.

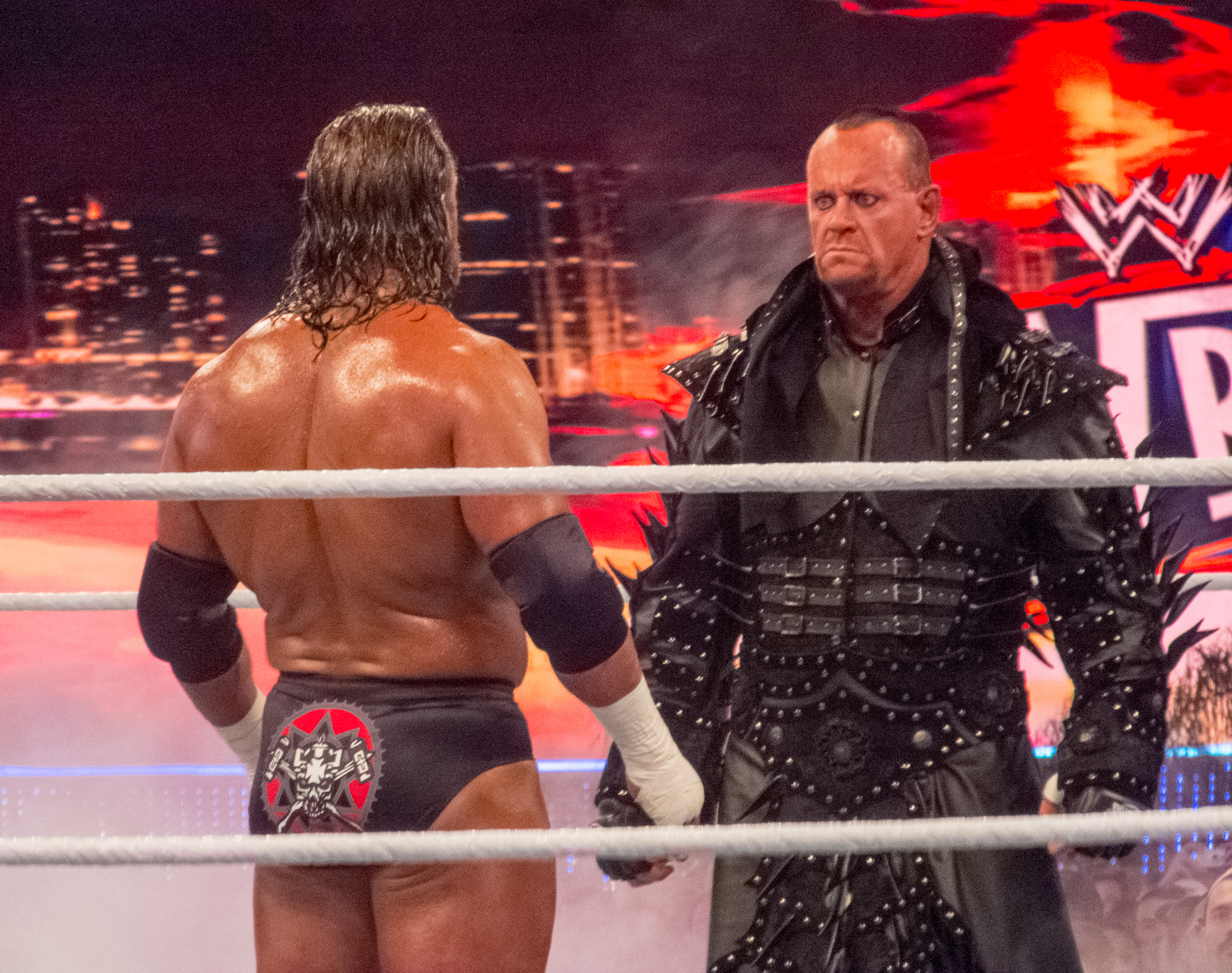
The Undertaker and Triple H facing off before their match

Jim Ross joined the commentators (Michael Cole and Jerry Lawler) for the Hell in a Cell match between Triple H and The Undertaker with Shawn Michaels as special guest referee billed as "The End of an Era". The match started with the two going back and forth. The match moved to the outside where The Undertaker dominated. Back in the ring, Triple H assaulted The Undertaker with the steel steps and even countered a Hell's Gate. The match intensified when Triple H brought steel chairs and a sledgehammer into the ring. After multiple big moves and weapon shots on each other, the two men repeatedly kicked out. After suffering a Pedigree, a Sweet Chin Music, and multiple chair and sledgehammer shots, The Undertaker came back and executed a Tombstone Piledriver; however, Triple H kicked out. Triple H delivered one more Pedigree before The Undertaker kicked out, took back control, performed another Tombstone, and won the match to extend his undefeated streak to 20–0. After the match, The Undertaker and Michaels helped Triple H out of the ring and made it to the entrance stage, where they embraced.

The following match was a twelve-man tag team match to determine who would run both Raw and SmackDown, pitting teams representing Teddy Long and John Laurinaitis against each other. The match began with a back-and-forth between both teams. After Booker T (of Team Teddy) entered he was worn down by most of Team Johnny until the rest of both teams engaged in an all-out brawl both inside and outside of the ring. Then, Zack Ryder (of Team Teddy) started to dominate Team Johnny's Dolph Ziggler and The Miz, but as he was distracted by his storyline girlfriend Eve, The Miz delivered a Skull Crushing Finale to Ryder and scored a pinfall victory for Team Johnny, giving John Laurinaitis control of both shows.

The penultimate match saw CM Punk defend the WWE Championship against Chris Jericho. However, John Laurinaitis told Punk backstage before the match that if Punk were to get disqualified, he would lose the title. Jericho immediately started attacking Punk. Jericho taunted and slapped Punk, trying to provoke him into getting Punk disqualified. Jericho grabbed a chair and attempted to hit him but Punk quickly cleared the chair and continued on with the match. Punk then successfully connected the GTS, only for a near fall. Punk then applied the Anaconda Vise, forcing Jericho to crawl through and was able to tip the rope. Punk missed the Turnbuckle Shining Wizard, which Jericho countered with a roll-up for a near fall. Jericho caught by Punk with a dropkick, then Punk prepared for a GTS, which Jericho noticed and he fled to the outside of the ring. The match began as Jericho was able to apply several Clothesline, followed by a seated dropkick. Jericho went for his signature submission, Walls of Jericho, but Punk countered. Punk missed the running knee as Jericho hit him with an unexpected Codebreaker for a near fall. At the match's climax, Punk won the match by reversing Jericho's Walls of Jericho into the Anaconda Vise, forcing Jericho to submit.

In a filler segment, Brodus Clay came out with his background dancers, Cameron and Naomi, followed by a group of dancers. Clay then presumably called his "momma", after which, Clay's "momma" came out and started dancing with rest of the other dancers.

=== Main event ===
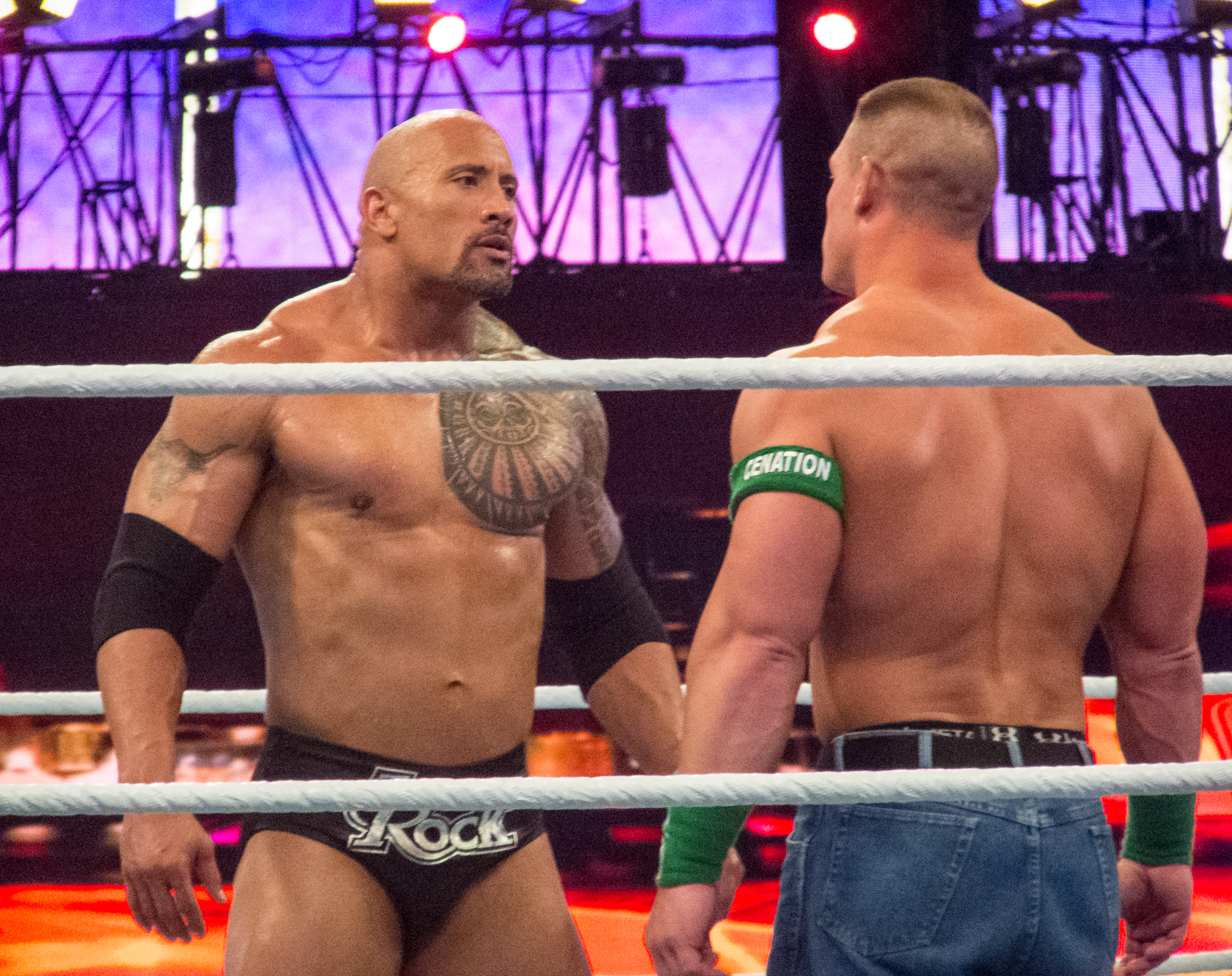
John Cena and The Rock staring each other down before their "once in a lifetime" match

The main event pitted John Cena and The Rock in a match billed "Once In A Lifetime". Cena and The Rock viciously went back-and-forth with each other throughout the match. During the course of the match, The Rock kicked out of two Attitude Adjustments, Cena out of a Rock Bottom and People's Elbow. When Cena attempted a People's Elbow on The Rock, throwing his sweatband in the crowd in similar fashion to The Rock, he ran into another Rock Bottom, which allowed The Rock to pin Cena and pick up the win.

== Reception ==
WrestleMania XXVIII received generally positive critical reception, with praise going to The Rock vs. John Cena, the WWE Championship match between CM Punk and Chris Jericho, and the match between The Undertaker and Triple H. However, the World Heavyweight Championship match between Daniel Bryan and Sheamus was heavily criticized for its short length and perceived burial of Bryan.

Eric Larnick of The Huffington Post praised the main event match giving it a verdict of good; he applauded Dwayne Johnson, opining that he worked "his butt off to prove that he can still go in the squared circle". The post also praised the WWE Championship and Hell in a Cell matches, ranking them alongside the main event. IGN called Daniel Bryan vs Sheamus the "worst match of the night" and The Undertaker vs. Triple H the "match of the night". They also applauded the main event match, calling the unexpected outcome a good way for the crowd to go home happy. Wrestling-Edge rated all the matches on a scale of 5 and gave a full 5 star ratings to The Undertaker vs. Triple H Hell in a Cell match.

The Baltimore Sun's Adam Testa led with a headline that WrestleMania XXVIII was unable to live up to the hype, while the main event did. He labeled the match as being the match that could break or make the WrestleMania and ended in "an amazing sequence". The Rock's victory was again stated as shocking and welcome, leaving people curious about the aftermath of the event. Yahoo's A. Orien Avery found The Rock vs. Hulk Hogan from WrestleMania X8 as the only comparable match from previous WrestleManias, though according to him The Rock being in his prime would make the match more symbolic.

WrestleMania XXVIII garnered 1,300,000 buys, making it the most purchased wrestling event in history, surpassing WrestleMania 23's buyrate of approximately 1.2 million, with global gross sales in excess of $67 million. The event also set a new record for the highest grossing live event in WWE history, grossing $8.9 million.

The Undertaker vs. Triple H Hell in a Cell match won the 2012 Slammy Award for the match of the year as well as being voted the match of the year on Pro Wrestling Illustrated. It has since been regarded as one of the greatest Hell in a Cell matches of all time, as well as one of the best matches in professional wrestling history.

== Aftermath ==
The following night on Raw, John Cena talked about his loss to The Rock. He asked for The Rock to come out so that he could offer his congratulations. Instead, Brock Lesnar, in his first appearance since WrestleMania XX in 2004, appeared and laid out Cena with an F-5. The following week, a match between Cena and Lesnar was scheduled for Extreme Rules, which was later changed to an Extreme Rules match. At Extreme Rules, Cena defeated Lesnar.

On the April 10 episode of SmackDown, it was announced that a two out of three falls match between Daniel Bryan and Sheamus for the World Heavyweight Championship would take place at Extreme Rules. At Extreme Rules, Sheamus defeated Bryan to retain the title and end the feud.

On the following episode of SmackDown, Randy Orton and Kane faced each other again, this time in a No Disqualification match, which Orton won. A Falls Count Anywhere match between the two was later scheduled for Extreme Rules, which Orton won to end the feud.

A tables match between Big Show and Cody Rhodes was scheduled for Extreme Rules, where Rhodes defeated Big Show to reclaim the title.

Also, a Chicago Street Fight between CM Punk and Chris Jericho for the WWE Championship was scheduled for Extreme Rules, where Punk retained the title.

At the 2013 Royal Rumble, John Cena won the Royal Rumble match to earn himself a world title match at WrestleMania 29. Later that night, The Rock defeated CM Punk to end Punk's 434 day reign as champion. The following night on Raw, Cena chose to face The Rock for the WWE Championship at WrestleMania 29. At WrestleMania 29, Cena defeated The Rock to win the title.

== Results ==
No.	Results	Stipulations	Times
1^{P}	Primo and Epico (c) (with Rosa Mendes) defeated Justin Gabriel and Tyson Kidd and The Usos (Jey Uso and Jimmy Uso) by pinfall	Triple threat match for the WWE Tag Team Championship	5:02
2	Sheamus defeated Daniel Bryan (c) (with AJ) by pinfall	Singles match for the World Heavyweight Championship	0:18
3	Kane defeated Randy Orton by pinfall	Singles match	10:58
4	Big Show defeated Cody Rhodes (c) by pinfall	Singles match for the WWE Intercontinental Championship	5:19
5	Kelly Kelly and Maria Menounos defeated Beth Phoenix and Eve Torres by pinfall	Tag team match	6:22
6	The Undertaker defeated Triple H by pinfall	Hell in a Cell match Shawn Michaels was the special guest referee.	30:53
7	Team Johnny (David Otunga, Dolph Ziggler, Drew McIntyre, Jack Swagger, Mark Henry and The Miz) (with John Laurinaitis, Brie Bella and Vickie Guerrero) defeated Team Teddy (Booker T, Kofi Kingston, The Great Khali, R-Truth, Santino Marella and Zack Ryder) (with Teddy Long, Aksana, Eve Torres, Hornswoggle, and Nikki Bella) by pinfall	Twelve-man tag team match to determine the general manager of both Raw and SmackDown	10:32
8	CM Punk (c) defeated Chris Jericho by submission	Singles match for the WWE Championship; Had Punk been disqualified, he would have lost the championship.	22:23
9	The Rock defeated John Cena by pinfall	Singles match	30:35
(c) / – the champion(s) heading into the match; P / – the match was broadcast on the pre-show
