= TLC: Tables, Ladders & Chairs (2011) =

WWE pay-per-view event

- Promotional poster featuring CM Punk
- Promotion: WWE
- Date: December 18, 2011
- City: Baltimore, Maryland
- Venue: 1st Mariner Arena
- Attendance: 9,000
- Buy rate: 179,000

Pay-per-view chronology
← Previous; Survivor Series	Next → Royal Rumble

TLC: Tables, Ladders & Chairs chronology
← Previous; 2010	Next → 2012

The 2011 TLC: Tables, Ladders & Chairs was a professional wrestling pay-per-view (PPV) event produced by WWE. It was the third annual TLC: Tables, Ladders & Chairs and took place on December 18, 2011, at the 1st Mariner Arena in Baltimore, Maryland. The concept of the show was based around the primary matches of the card each utilizing tables, ladders, and chairs as legal weapons.

Eleven matches were contested at the event, 10 of which took place live on pay-per-view. In the main event, CM Punk defeated The Miz and Alberto Del Rio in a triple threat Tables, Ladders, and Chairs match to retain the WWE Championship. In other prominent matches, Big Show defeated Mark Henry in a chairs match to win the World Heavyweight Championship, after which, Daniel Bryan cashed in his Money in the Bank contract and defeated Big Show to win the title, and in the opening bout, Zack Ryder defeated Dolph Ziggler to win the United States Championship.

The event received 179,000 pay-per-view purchases, which was down from the previous year's 195,000 buys. This was the first TLC event held following the discontinuation of the first brand extension in August. It was also the first TLC event held to be promoted under the company's shortened trade name of WWE, as following WrestleMania XXVII in April, the company ceased using its full name of World Wrestling Entertainment, although that remains the legal name of the company.

== Production ==
=== Background ===
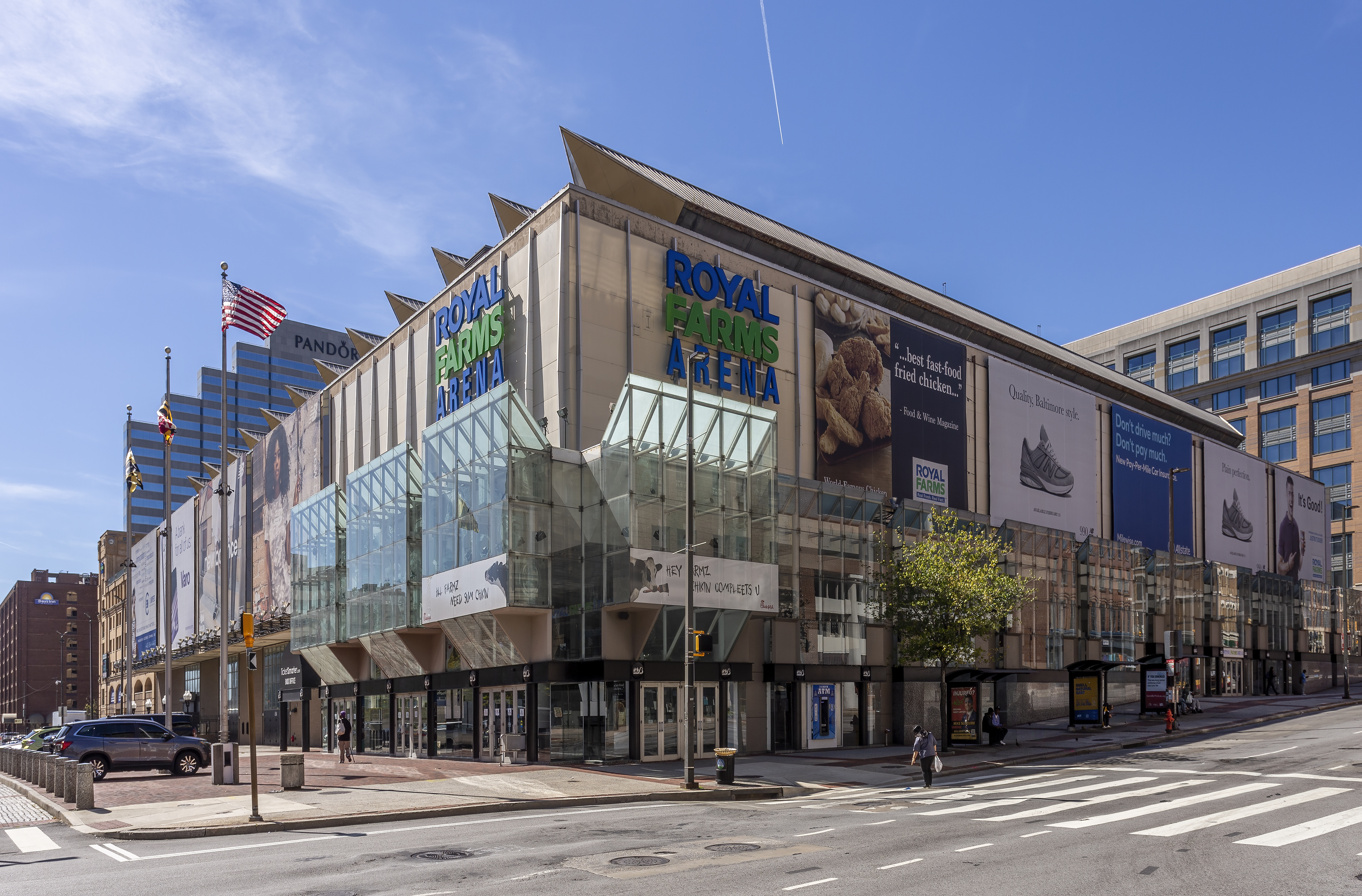
The third annual TLC: Tables, Ladders & Chairs was held at the 1st Mariner Arena in Baltimore, Maryland.

TLC: Tables, Ladders & Chairs was an annual professional wrestling pay-per-view (PPV) event produced every December by WWE since 2009. The concept of the event was based on the primary matches of the card each containing a stipulation using tables, ladders, and chairs as legal weapons, with the main event generally being a Tables, Ladders, and Chairs match. The third TLC event was scheduled to take place on December 18, 2011, at the 1st Mariner Arena in Baltimore, Maryland.

This was the first TLC event held following the end of the first brand split in August. It was also the first TLC event held to be promoted under the company's shortened trade name of WWE, as following WrestleMania XXVII in April, the company ceased using its full name of World Wrestling Entertainment, although that remains the legal name of the company.

=== Storylines ===
The card included matches that resulted from scripted storylines. Results were predetermined by WWE's writers, while storylines were produced on WWE's weekly television shows, Raw and SmackDown.

The main rivalry heading into TLC involved CM Punk, The Miz, and Alberto Del Rio over the WWE Championship. At Survivor Series, Punk won the WWE Championship from Del Rio and retained the title against him on the November 28 episode of Raw. The following week, Miz, Del Rio, John Cena, and United States Champion Dolph Ziggler argued over who should be the #1 contender. John Laurinaitis announced that each of them would face a SmackDown superstar and if they won, they would receive a match for the title. Del Rio defeated Daniel Bryan, Miz defeated Randy Orton by countout, Ziggler lost to Sheamus, and Cena defeated Zack Ryder, who was not a SmackDown superstar, but gave up his opportunity to give Ryder a United States championship match. During the contract signing, Laurinaitis announced the match would be a Triple Threat Tables, Ladders and Chairs match.

Another rivalry involved Mark Henry and Big Show over the World Heavyweight Championship. At Money in the Bank, Henry crushed Big Show's fibula, keeping him out of action for nearly 3 months. At Night of Champions, Henry won the World Heavyweight Championship from Randy Orton. At Vengeance, a title match between Henry and Big Show ended in a no-contest after the ring imploded. They had a rematch at Survivor Series, but Big Show won by disqualification when Henry attacked him with a low blow. On WWE.com, it was announced the two would face each other in a Chairs match for the title at the event.

== Event ==
Other on-screen personnel
Role:	Name:
English Commentators	Michael Cole
English Commentators	Jerry Lawler
Spanish Commentators	Carlos Cabrera
Spanish Commentators	Marcelo Rodriguez
Backstage interviewer	Josh Mathews
Ring announcers	Lilian Garcia
Ring announcers	Justin Roberts
Referees	Mike Chioda
Referees	John Cone
Referees	Scott Armstrong
Referees	Chad Patton

=== Preliminary matches ===
The first match was the WWE United States Championship match between Dolph Ziggler and Zack Ryder. After a back-and-forth contest, Ryder appeared to have Ziggler pinned but Vickie interfered and put Ziggler's foot on the ropes, leading to Vickie being ejected from ringside. Ryder executed the "Rough Ryder" to win the title.

The next match was for the WWE Tag Team Championship between Air Boom (Kofi Kingston and Evan Bourne) and Primo & Epico. Kingston executed the Trouble in Paradise on Primo to retain the titles.

The third match was a tables match between Randy Orton and Wade Barrett. The match saw both competitors attempting to put the other through a table. The finish came when Barrett positioned Orton on a table and attempted a diving elbow drop but Orton countered with an RKO on Barrett through the table for the win.

The next match was for the WWE Divas Championship between Beth Phoenix and Kelly Kelly. The match started off with both divas brawling outside the ring. After some back-and-forth action, Phoenix attempted the Glam Slam but Kelly countered the attempt into a pin, which Phoenix kicked out of. Kelly then attempted a Hurricanrana but Phoenix countered into a Reverse Electric Chair to retain the title.

The fifth match was a Sledgehammer Ladder match between Triple H and Kevin Nash. After back-and-forth action, both men tried to retrieve the sledgehammer but Triple H used the sledgehammer on Nash, knocking Nash off a ladder through a table, and unhooked the sledgehammer. Triple H executed a Pedigree and grabbed the sledgehammer. Nash pleaded for mercy with the Kliq hand sign but Triple H responded with a crotch chop and hit Nash with the sledgehammer to win the match.

The sixth match was an impromptu match between Sheamus and Jack Swagger. After back-and-forth action, Sheamus attempted a Brogue Kick but Swagger countered and applied an ankle lock but Sheamus countered. Sheamus executed a Brogue Kick to win the match.

Next was a chairs match for the World Heavyweight Championship between Mark Henry and Big Show. Big Show threw chairs into the ring as Henry tried to leave but Big Show stopped him. After the two attacked each other with chairs and countered the other's attempts to execute their finishers, Big Show executed a KO Punch to win the title. After the match, Henry executed a DDT on Big Show onto several chairs. Daniel Bryan cashed in his Money in the Bank briefcase and pinned Big Show to win the title.

The next match was for the Intercontinental Championship between Intercontinental Champion Cody Rhodes and Booker T. The match was scheduled for earlier but Rhodes twice attacked Booker T before the start. After a quick start by Booker T, Rhodes took control. After Booker T missed a Scissors Kick, he tried a Superkick but missed, allowing Rhodes to execute two Disaster Kicks to retain the title.

=== Main event match ===
The main event was the triple threat Tables, Ladders, and Chairs match for the WWE Championship between The Miz, Alberto Del Rio, and CM Punk. At the outset the others double teamed Punk. Punk ducked a double clothesline and knocked both opponents down. Miz & Del Rio recovered and landed a superplex. Miz and Del Rio went to the floor to grab a ladder. Del Rio broke the alliance and smacked Miz with a chair. Del Rio grabbed a ladder but Punk dove onto Del Rio. Punk and Miz returned to the ring where Miz stomped on Punk and landed a chair shot to Punk's gut. Punk put his knee in Miz's face, but missed a running bulldog, allowing Miz to drop Punk head first into the chair. Del Rio came back into the ring where Miz tried a Skull Crushing Finale while Del Rio was on the ladder. Del Rio reversed it and slammed Miz on the ladder. Punk slammed Del Rio with the ladder and threw Del Rio into the barrier. Del Rio escaped Punk's superplex but not the following neck breaker. Miz landed a second chair shot to Punk's gut. Punk grabbed it and started beating on Miz. Punk put Miz on top of the barrier and Punk executed a high knee, sending both men over the barrier. Del Rio handcuffed Punk to the ladder. Punk broke the ladder but was still handcuffed. Punk used them to backdrop Del Rio onto the ladder. Miz climbed the ladder, but Punk knocked him down and attempted a GTS, but Miz escaped. Punk and Miz went to the top rope, where Punk tried to superplex Miz. Del Rio kicked Punk through a table onto the floor. Del Rio used the chair against Miz and applied a Cross Armbreaker on Miz, whose arm was trapped in the chair. Del Rio headed back to Punk and attacked him with a chair shot. Del Rio laid a cross armbreaker on Punk and then climbed the ladder. Miz & Punk knocked him off and the ropes end up between his legs. Punk and Miz fought inside the ring where they took each other out with clotheslines. Ricardo Rodriguez came into the ring and climbed the ladder. Miz and Punk tipped the ladder over, sending Ricardo into a table on the floor. Both men blocked the other's finisher. Miz went to the corner, where Punk tried to execute a high knee only to go into the ring post. Miz hooked Punk's handcuff to the turnbuckle. After missing some punches, Punk knocked Miz out of the ring with a roundhouse kick. Del Rio and Miz pulled a ladder into the ring. Punk broke the turnbuckle to free himself. All three men climbed the ladder. Punk knocked out Del Rio down to the mat. He and Miz finished the fight in the ring where Punk executed a GTS, climbed the ladder, and retrieved and retained the championship.

== Results ==
No.	Results	Stipulations	Times
1^{D}	Drew McIntyre defeated Alex Riley by pinfall	Singles match	4:37
2	Zack Ryder defeated Dolph Ziggler (c) (with Vickie Guerrero) by pinfall	Singles match for the WWE United States Championship	10:23
3	Air Boom (Kofi Kingston and Evan Bourne) (c) defeated Primo and Epico (with Rosa Mendes) by pinfall	Tag team match for the WWE Tag Team Championship	7:32
4	Randy Orton defeated Wade Barrett	Tables match	10:16
5	Beth Phoenix (c) defeated Kelly Kelly by pinfall	Singles match for the WWE Divas Championship	5:17
6	Triple H defeated Kevin Nash by pinfall	Sledgehammer Ladder match	18:13
7	Sheamus defeated Jack Swagger (with Vickie Guerrero) by pinfall	Singles match	5:57
8	Big Show defeated Mark Henry (c) by pinfall	Chairs match for the World Heavyweight Championship	5:31
9	Daniel Bryan defeated Big Show (c) by pinfall	Singles match for the World Heavyweight Championship; This was Daniel Bryan's Money in the Bank cash-in match.	0:07
10	Cody Rhodes (c) defeated Booker T by pinfall	Singles match for the WWE Intercontinental Championship	7:18
11	CM Punk (c) defeated The Miz and Alberto Del Rio (with Ricardo Rodriguez)	Triple Threat Tables, Ladders, and Chairs match for the WWE Championship	18:25
(c) / – the champion(s) heading into the match; D / – this was a dark match
