= Royal Rumble (2012) =

WWE pay-per-view event

- Promotional poster featuring Santino Marella
- Promotion: WWE
- Date: January 29, 2012
- City: St. Louis, Missouri
- Venue: Scottrade Center
- Attendance: 18,121
- Buy rate: 443,000

Pay-per-view chronology
← Previous; TLC: Tables, Ladders & Chairs	Next → Elimination Chamber

Royal Rumble chronology
← Previous; 2011	Next → 2013

The 2012 Royal Rumble was a professional wrestling pay-per-view (PPV) event produced by WWE. It was the 25th annual Royal Rumble event and took place on January 29, 2012, at the Scottrade Center in St. Louis, Missouri. It was the first Royal Rumble event held since the end of the first brand extension in August 2011.

The event was based around the men's Royal Rumble match, a modified battle royal in which the participants enter at timed intervals instead of all beginning in the ring at the same time and the winner received a world championship match at WrestleMania. For the 2012 event, the winner received their choice to challenge for either the WWE Championship or World Heavyweight Championship at WrestleMania XXVIII. While the previous year's event had featured 40 participants in the match, the 2012 event reduced it back to its traditional 30 participants.

Six professional wrestling matches were featured at the event. The main event was the 2012 Royal Rumble match. Sheamus, the 22nd entrant, won the match by last eliminating Chris Jericho, the 29th entrant. Two title matches were featured: a WWE Championship match with CM Punk defending against Dolph Ziggler, which Punk won to retain, and a Triple Threat Steel Cage match for the World Heavyweight Championship between the reigning champion Daniel Bryan, Big Show, and Mark Henry, which Bryan won to retain. Incidentally, this event was also noted as Mick Foley's last night as an active wrestler as he would compete in the Royal Rumble match.

The event received 443,000 pay-per-view buys, slightly down from 446,000 buys the previous year's event had received.

== Production ==
=== Background ===
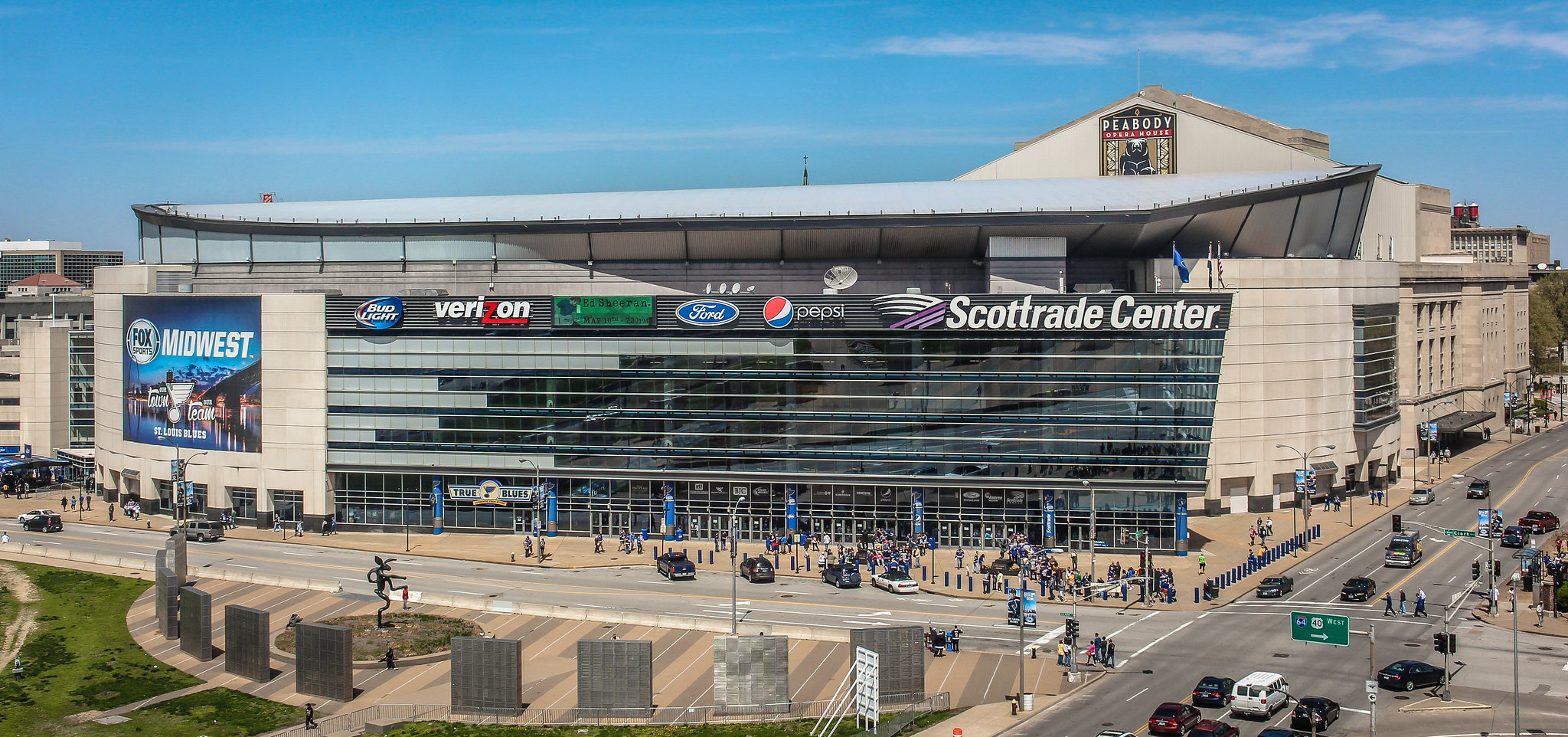
The 25th annual Royal Rumble event was held at the Scottrade Center in St. Louis, Missouri.

The Royal Rumble is an annual professional wrestling event, produced every January by WWE since 1988; that first event was a television special before it became a pay-per-view (PPV) event beginning in 1989. It is one of the promotion's original four pay-per-views, along with WrestleMania, SummerSlam, and Survivor Series, referred to as the "Big Four". It is named after and centered on the men's Royal Rumble match. The 25th Royal Rumble event was scheduled to be held on January 29, 2012, at the Scottrade Center in St. Louis, Missouri. Tickets went on sale on December 10, 2011, through Ticketmaster.

The Royal Rumble match is a modified battle royal in which the participants enter at timed intervals instead of all beginning in the ring at the same time, and the match generally features 30 wrestlers. Since 1993, the winner earns a world championship match at that year's WrestleMania. For 2012, the winner could choose to challenge for either the WWE Championship or World Heavyweight Championship at WrestleMania XXVIII. While the prior year's event had featured 40 participants in the match, the 2012 event reduced it back to its traditional 30 participants.

This was the first Royal Rumble event to be held following the end of the first brand extension in August 2011. This was also the first Royal Rumble event held to be promoted under the company's shortened trade name of WWE, as following WrestleMania XXVII in April 2011, the company ceased using its full name of World Wrestling Entertainment, although that remains the legal name of the company.

=== Storylines ===
The event comprised five matches, including one on the pre-show, that resulted from scripted storylines. Results were predetermined by WWE's writers, while storylines were produced on WWE's weekly television shows, Raw and SmackDown.

A highly promoted match featured CM Punk defending his WWE Championship against Dolph Ziggler. On the December 26, 2011, episode of Raw, Punk was put into a gauntlet match by Interim Raw General Manager John Laurinaitis, with the stipulation that if either one of Jack Swagger, Ziggler, or Mark Henry defeated Punk, they would receive a championship match against the latter the next week. Ziggler won the match after Punk was distracted by Laurinaitis throwing out Vickie Guerrero and Swagger from ringside. The next week, during the title match, Punk was counted out as a result of another intervention from Laurinaitis. However, since titles cannot change hands via countout, Punk retained the championship. After the match, Laurinaitis announced that Punk would defend his championship against Ziggler in a rematch at the Royal Rumble, with himself acting as the special guest referee. Then on the January 9, 2012, episode, when Punk faced Swagger in a singles match, Laurinaitis added a stipulation that if Swagger lost, he and Vickie Guerrero would be banned from ringside at the pay-per-view; Punk won the match, and thus, Guerrero and Swagger are banned from ringside during the championship match. Additionally, a week later on the January 16 episode, in a segment with Mick Foley, Laurinaitis revealed that he was using this opportunity to cost Punk his title for disrespecting him.

Another match heading into the Royal Rumble featured John Cena against Kane. Upon returning to WWE on the December 12 episode of Raw, after an absence of nearly four months, Kane interrupted Cena's match against Mark Henry, and though it was Henry who put him out of action, he bypassed him and attacked Cena, chokeslamming him before revealing his new mask. While demanding an explanation for these events the next week on Raw, Cena was again attacked by Kane, who revealed in the next several weeks of his desire to have Cena "embrace the hate" (his current on-screen character and T-shirt promoting otherwise) within caused by the anti-Cena crowd who continued to boo him. When Cena dismissed any intentions of doing so, Kane not only continued his attacks on Cena, but began to direct his attention to his close friend Zack Ryder, assaulting him as well, to the point of injuring him (kayfabe), ultimately leading to Ryder losing his United States Championship to Jack Swagger on the January 16, 2012, episode, under orders from John Laurinaitis. The same night, Laurinaitis put Cena in a one-on-one match against Kane at the Royal Rumble, in addition to booking Cena in a match against Swagger. Before the match even officially started, Cena started to attack Swagger aggressively to avenge Ryder's loss, prompting Kane to appear on the TitanTron and congratulate him to have started "embracing his hate". On the January 23 episode, during a Falls Count Anywhere match (in which Laurinaitis had prevented Cena from interfering, on the pretext of never granting Ryder a rematch for the United States Championship if he did so), Kane chokeslammed Ryder through the entrance stage, incapacitating him. As Ryder was stretchered and taken away in an ambulance, Eve Torres (Ryder's storyline girlfriend) blamed Cena for Ryder's injuries, leading to Cena knocking the microphone out of interviewer Josh Mathews' hand in frustration, and donning a very aggressive look in response to this entire situation.

Another featured bout involved Daniel Bryan defending his World Heavyweight Championship in a Triple Threat Steel Cage match against Big Show and Mark Henry. In December 2011, at TLC: Tables, Ladders and Chairs, after Big Show defeated Henry in a chairs match to win the World Heavyweight Championship for the first time, Bryan immediately cashed in his Money in the Bank contract to defeat Big Show, after a post-match attack on the latter by Henry. Using his rematch clause, Big Show faced off against Bryan on SmackDown, only for the champion to agitate Henry at ringside, who pushed Bryan, thus retaining his title. The following week on SmackDown, Bryan defended his title against Big Show again, this time in a No Disqualification, No Count-Out match, which ended in a no contest, when Big Show accidentally ran into and injured Bryan's storyline girlfriend, AJ. The next week on SmackDown, Henry finally enacted his rematch clause against Bryan in a lumberjack match; however, that match also ended up as a no contest, when the lumberjacks became too hostile because of how Bryan had agitated them, and the post-match scenario erupted into a large brawl involving nearly everyone. This forced SmackDown General Manager Theodore Long to officially book Bryan, Big Show, and Henry in a Triple Threat Steel Cage match for the World Heavyweight Championship at the Royal Rumble.

== Event ==
Other on-screen personnel
Role:	Name:
English Commentators	Michael Cole
English Commentators	Jerry Lawler
English Commentators	Booker T
Spanish Commentators	Carlos Cabrera
Spanish Commentators	Marcelo Rodriguez
Backstage interviewer	Josh Mathews
Ring announcers	Lilian Garcia
Ring announcers	Justin Roberts
Referees	Mike Chioda
Referees	Charles Robinson
Referees	Scott Armstrong
Referees	Drake Wuertz

In a dark match prior to the PPV broadcast, Yoshi Tatsu defeated Heath Slater.

=== Preliminary matches ===
The actual pay-per-view opened with a Triple Threat Steel Cage match with Daniel Bryan defending his World Heavyweight Championship against Mark Henry and Big Show. Bryan retained by escaping the cage after he fell from Big Show's grasp (Bryan was climbing out of the cage, and Show was trying to pull him back in over the top) and fell to the arena floor.

The next match was an Eight-Diva tag team match with Alicia Fox, Eve Torres, Kelly Kelly, and Tamina Snuka taking on The Bella Twins (Nikki Bella and Brie Bella) and The Divas of Doom (Divas Champion Beth Phoenix and Natalya). The latter team won after Phoenix tagged herself in and performed a glam slam on Kelly Kelly, scoring the pinfall.

The following match was between John Cena and Kane. After a back and forth contest, the action would spill from the ring, and the match ended in a double count-out. After the match, Kane would continue his assault, hitting Cena with multiple chair shots before attacking an injured Zack Ryder, who was watching the event from a private office. Kane dragged Ryder to the ring and performed a Tombstone Piledriver on him. Cena then reentered the ring and tried to retaliate, only for Kane to execute a chokeslam on him.

The next match was made after Drew McIntyre requested a spot in the Royal Rumble, asking SmackDown general manager Teddy Long for an opportunity to prove himself, so he gave him a match against a mystery opponent who turned out to be Brodus Clay. Despite McIntyre starting the match well, Clay would quickly defeat him after a running splash.

The penultimate match of the card was the WWE Championship match between reigning champion CM Punk and Dolph Ziggler with Raw interim GM John Laurinaitis serving as outside enforcer. As per the match stipulations, Ziggler's tag team partner Jack Swagger and manager Vickie Guerrero were both banned from ringside. The first part of the match was a hold-for-hold encounter. Towards the latter part of the match Punk had Ziggler beaten, but the referee was knocked out and unable to make the count. Punk would execute a second GTS and both the referee and enforcer Laurinaitis counted to three and Punk retained his championship.

=== Main event ===
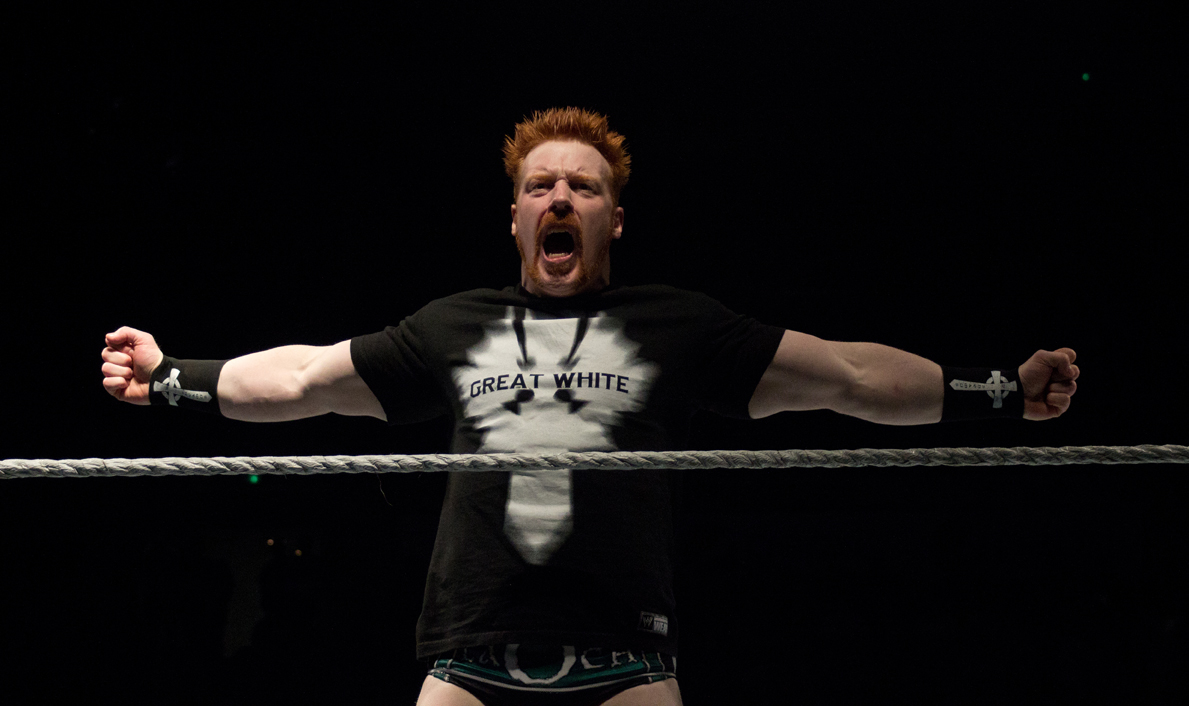
Sheamus won the 2012 Royal Rumble match.

The main event was the annual Royal Rumble match, where the winner would get a world championship match of their choice at WrestleMania XXVIII. As a result of losing a match to R-Truth on Raw, The Miz entered at #1, and started the match with Alex Riley. Miz quickly eliminated Riley and was then joined by entrant #3, R-Truth, before Intercontinental Champion Cody Rhodes entered at #4. Miz eliminated R-Truth, who then pulled Miz under the bottom rope and laid him out on the outside. Mick Foley, the first surprise entrant of the match, entered at #7 and immediately eliminated one half of the Tag Team Champions Primo (#6). Ricardo Rodriguez then entered at #8 and teamed up with Foley to eliminate Justin Gabriel (#5). Santino Marella entered at #9 and eliminated Ricardo before squaring off with Foley. Marella brought out his Cobra puppet while Foley brought out Mr. Socko. The two then teamed up to eliminate entrant #10 Epico, the other half of the Tag Team Champions. Marella and Foley locked Cobra and Mr. Socko together, only for Rhodes to intervene and eliminate Marella. Foley applied Mr. Socko on Miz, but Rhodes then eliminated him as well. Hall of Famer Jerry "The King" Lawler, who was sitting on commentary, entered at #12 as a surprise entrant and performed a diving fist drop on Miz, but was quickly eliminated by Rhodes immediately afterwards.

The ring began to fill up with superstars as Booker T, who was also sitting on commentary, entered at #17 and Hall of Famer and first ever winner "Hacksaw" Jim Duggan entered at #19, the latter of whom was quickly eliminated by Rhodes. Miz almost eliminated Kofi Kingston (#11) by causing him to almost fall off the apron. When Miz tried to flip Kingston over by his legs, Kingston instead did a handstand and walked over to the steps without his feet touching the floor, saving himself and staying in the match. Rhodes and Dolph Ziggler (#18) teamed up to eliminate Booker T and The Great Khali (#15). Michael Cole, the final member of the commentary team, entered at #20, only to be joined by entrant #21, Kharma, the third female superstar to ever enter a Royal Rumble match. Cole climbed over the top rope to avoid Kharma, only for Lawler and Booker T to pull Cole to the floor, eliminating him. Kharma then eliminated Hunico (#16), but was then eliminated by Ziggler. Another surprise entrant, Road Dogg, entered at #23, before United States Champion Jack Swagger joined the match at #25. Wade Barrett (#26) eliminated Road Dogg only to be joined by 2009 winner Randy Orton (#28), who in turn eliminated him. Chris Jericho came out at #29, eliminating David Otunga (#27), before Big Show entered at #30. As Big Show entered, he assisted Sheamus (#22) in eliminating Swagger before hitting Swagger with a knockout punch. Big Show cleared out the ring, eliminating both Miz (who lasted over 45 minutes) and Rhodes (who lasted over 41 minutes and scored the most eliminations with six) at the same time, as well as Ziggler.

This brought the final four down to Sheamus, Orton, Jericho and Big Show. The former three teamed up on Big Show, who fought them off, executing a chokeslam on Jericho only to be hit with an RKO from Orton. Sheamus and Orton then attempted to eliminate Big Show. Big Show pushed Sheamus away but Orton tipped Big Show over the top rope to eliminate him. Immediately afterwards, Jericho quickly eliminated Orton from behind to put himself in the final two with Sheamus.

Sheamus and Jericho went back-and-forth as Sheamus countered a running bulldog from Jericho to almost eliminate him, but Jericho fought out of it and hit Sheamus with a dropkick. Sheamus hit Jericho with the Irish Curse backbreaker and set up the High Cross to try and eliminate him. Jericho slipped out and clotheslined Sheamus over the top rope, who held on, before Jericho hit another dropkick to try and eliminate Sheamus, who still managed to hold on. Sheamus fought back into the ring, hitting a battering ram on Jericho before attempting a Brogue Kick. Jericho countered and locked Sheamus in the Walls of Jericho. Jericho tried to clothesline Sheamus over the top rope, but Sheamus countered and flipped Jericho over the top rope onto the apron, who held on just enough to stop his feet touching the floor. The two superstars made their way onto the top turnbuckle, where both fell off but avoided elimination. Jericho caught Sheamus with a Codebreaker and attempted to tip him over the top rope, but Sheamus fought out of it and pushed Jericho away. Jericho ducked a Brogue Kick attempt from Sheamus and attempted a second Codebreaker, but Sheamus countered by catching Jericho and threw him over the top rope onto the apron. Jericho again avoided touching the floor, but as he brought himself back up, Sheamus hit him with a Brogue Kick, which knocked Jericho off the apron to finally eliminate him after a seven-minute clash, meaning Sheamus won the Royal Rumble match.

== Reception ==
The event received mixed reviews. The Canadian Online Explorer gave the event a 6.5 out of 10, with the Royal Rumble match receiving the same rating. The World Heavyweight Championship match and the John Cena vs. Kane match were rated a 5 out of 10 and the Divas' tag-team match a 3 out of 10. The WWE Championship match received the highest rating with an 8.5 out of 10.

== Results ==
No.	Results	Stipulations	Times
1^{D}	Yoshi Tatsu defeated Heath Slater by pinfall	Singles match	4:00
2	Daniel Bryan (c) defeated Big Show and Mark Henry by escaping the cage	Triple Threat Steel Cage match for the World Heavyweight Championship	9:08
3	Beth Phoenix, Natalya, and The Bella Twins (Brie and Nikki) defeated Kelly Kelly, Eve Torres, Alicia Fox, and Tamina Snuka by pinfall	Eight-Diva tag team match	5:29
4	Kane vs. John Cena ended in a double countout	Singles match	10:56
5	Brodus Clay (with Cameron and Naomi) defeated Drew McIntyre by pinfall	Singles match	1:05
6	CM Punk (c) defeated Dolph Ziggler by pinfall	Singles match for the WWE Championship with John Laurinaitis as special guest enforcer Jack Swagger & Vickie Guerrero were banned from ringside	14:32
7	Sheamus won by last eliminating Chris Jericho	30-man Royal Rumble match for a world championship match at WrestleMania XXVIII	54:54
(c) / – the champion(s) heading into the match; D / – this was a dark match

=== Royal Rumble entrances and eliminations ===
– Winner
– Hall of Famer (HOF)

Draw	Entrant	Order	Eliminated by	Time	Eliminations
1	The Miz	25	Big Show	45:39	2
2	Alex Riley	1	The Miz	01:15	0
3	R-Truth	2	The Miz	04:57	0
4	Cody Rhodes	24	Big Show	41:55	6
5	Justin Gabriel	4	Mick Foley & Ricardo Rodriguez	06:12	0
6	Primo	3	Mick Foley	01:57	0
7	Mick Foley	8	Cody Rhodes	06:34	3
8	Ricardo Rodriguez	5	Santino Marella	02:19	1
9	Santino Marella	7	Cody Rhodes	02:31	1
10	Epico	6	Mick Foley	00:11	0
11	Kofi Kingston	18	Sheamus	17:55	0
12	Jerry Lawler	9	Cody Rhodes	00:43	1
13	Ezekiel Jackson	11	The Great Khali	03:46	0
14	Jinder Mahal	10	The Great Khali	01:17	0
15	The Great Khali	13	Cody Rhodes & Dolph Ziggler	07:29	2
16	Hunico	16	Kharma	09:00	0
17	Booker T	14	Cody Rhodes & Dolph Ziggler	04:40	1
18	Dolph Ziggler	26	Big Show	19:46	3
19	Jim Duggan	12	Cody Rhodes	00:56	0
20	Michael Cole	15	Booker T & Jerry Lawler (Note: Booker T and Jerry Lawler were both eliminated prior to eliminating Cole.)	01:23	0
21	Kharma	17	Dolph Ziggler	01:00	1
22	Sheamus	—	Winner	22:21	3
23	Road Dogg	19	Wade Barrett	04:55	0
24	Jey Uso	20	Randy Orton	07:03	0
25	Jack Swagger	23	Big Show & Sheamus (Note: Big Show had not entered the match before assisting in eliminating Swagger.)	07:59	0
26	Wade Barrett	21	Randy Orton	03:55	1
27	David Otunga	22	Chris Jericho	03:15	0
28	Randy Orton	28	Chris Jericho	05:46	3
29	Chris Jericho	29	Sheamus	11:34	2
30	Big Show	27	Randy Orton	01:51	4
