= John Laurinaitis =

American professional wrestler and business executive

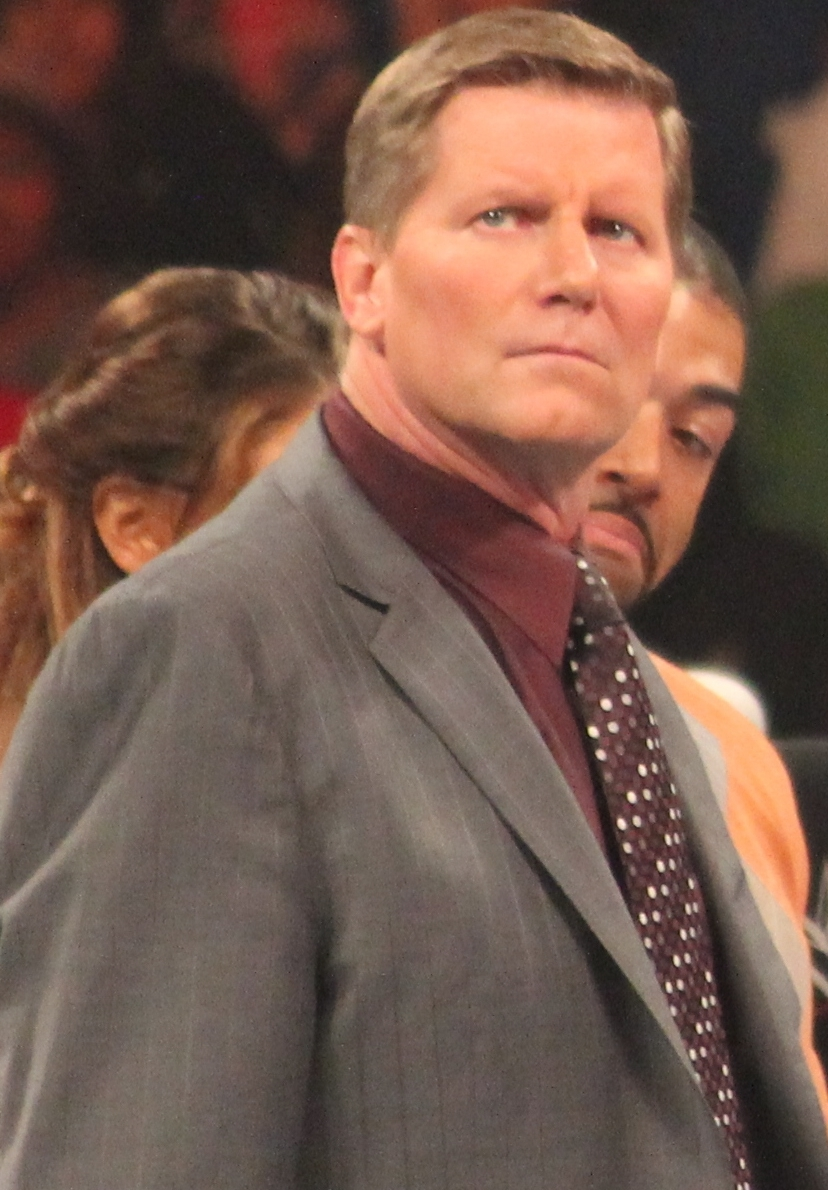
- Laurinaitis in 2012

Personal information
- Born: John Hodger Laurinaitis; July 31, 1962 (age 64) Philadelphia, Pennsylvania, U.S.
- Spouse: Kathy Colace (m. 2016; div. 2024)
- Relatives: Road Warrior Animal (brother); The Terminator (brother); James Laurinaitis (nephew)

Professional wrestling career
- Ring name(s): John Laurinaitis; Johnny Ace
- Billed height: 6 ft 4 in (1.93 m)
- Billed weight: 250 lb (110 kg)
- Billed from: San Bernardino, California "The City of Sunshine" (as part of The Dynamic Dudes)
- Trained by: Nelson Royal
- Debut: 1986
- Retired: 2012

John Hodger Laurinaitis (born July 31, 1962), also known by his former ring name Johnny Ace, is an American retired professional wrestler and business executive.

He has wrestled for such promotions as World Championship Wrestling (WCW), All Japan Pro Wrestling (AJPW) and WWE. He is the brother of Joe (Road Warrior Animal; one half of the former wrestling tag team The Road Warriors) and Marcus, and is also the uncle of former National Football League player James Laurinaitis. In WWE, Laurinaitis worked in the talent relations office for eight years, and as occasional professional wrestler from 2011 until 2012. After his on screen firing, he stepped down from his corporate backstage role to being a producer. He was promoted again to Head of Talent Relations in 2021 until his release in 2022. Prior to joining WWE, Laurinaitis worked as an executive for WCW.

== Early life ==
John Hodger Laurinaitis was born on July 31, 1962 in Philadelphia, Pennsylvania. He is of Lithuanian ancestry.

== Professional wrestling career ==
=== National Wrestling Alliance/World Championship Wrestling (1986–1990) ===
Laurinaitis started wrestling in 1986 as Johnny Ace. At first, while wrestling in NWA's Florida Championship Wrestling, Ace frequently teamed with his brother The Terminator. He was also a flag-bearer for The Sheepherders and followed them to another NWA territory, Jim Crockett Promotions. Later, after JCP had been bought out by Turner Broadcasting Systems and become World Championship Wrestling, he formed a tag team with Shane Douglas called "The Dynamic Dudes". They were managed by Jim Cornette until Cornette turned on them for Bobby Eaton and Stan Lane's version of The Midnight Express. In his last televised WCW match, Ace lost to Mean Mark Callous, later known as The Undertaker, at Capital Combat on May 19, 1990.

=== All Japan Pro Wrestling (1988–2000) ===
As All Japan Pro Wrestling was cutting its ties with the NWA in 1990, Laurinaitis chose to stay in it; thus, he became a permanent foreign fixture on the roster. In AJPW, he found a lot of success, teaming with Kenta Kobashi, "Dr. Death" Steve Williams and Bart Gunn.

Laurinaitis enjoyed significant championship success and acclaim during his tenure, becoming a two-time All Asia Tag Team Champion, a four-time World Tag Team Champion, and the winner of the New Year's Heavyweight Battle Royal on January 2, 1991, at Korakuen Hall. Two of his matches received 5 Stars from Dave Meltzer, he won the "Match of the Year" award from the Wrestling Observer, and was ranked #77 in Pro Wrestling Illustrated's (PWI) top 500 wrestlers for 1997. On February 28, 1998, Laurinaitis would reach the highest point of his singles career as he challenged Mitsuharu Misawa for the Triple Crown Heavyweight Championship. It would be Laurinaitis' only shot at those three prestigious belts. Following his retirement in 2000, he was placed #203 in PWI's top 500 all time rankings.

=== World Championship Wrestling (2000–2001) ===
Laurinaitis retired from the ring in June 2000 after the split between All Japan Pro Wrestling and Pro Wrestling Noah. He soon returned to World Championship Wrestling, where he replaced Vince Russo as head booker. Laurinaitis was responsible for booking the highly acclaimed one-night single elimination tournament held for the WCW United States Heavyweight Championship that was won by the debuting Lance Storm.

=== World Wrestling Federation / Entertainment / WWE (2001–2022) ===
==== Backstage roles and Senior Vice President of Talent Operations (2001–2012) ====
Laurinaitis was hired in as a road agent after WWF's acquisition of certain assets of WCW in March 2001 and in June on the same year, Laurinaitis was promoted to director of talent relations. In June 2004, Laurinaitis replaced Jim Ross as vice president of talent relations, then being promoted to senior vice president in February 2007 and finally to executive vice president in March 2009. However, when Stephanie McMahon took over talent relations and handed over the reins to her husband, Paul Levesque ("Triple H"), Laurinaitis moved down from his executive duties to being senior vice president of talent operations. Laurinaitis's tenure in this role has received criticism from those who have worked for him, including Jim Cornette who, in his interviews with Kayfabe Commentaries, described how Laurinaitis failed to work in the same capacity with Ohio Valley Wrestling (WWE's developmental territory) as Ross did, often failing to warn the promotion when wrestlers OVW were using at the time were going to be called up to the main roster or when wrestlers from the main roster were set to appear for OVW but never did. Eventually WWE would end their relationship with OVW.

==== On-air authority figure (2011–2012) ====
On the June 27, 2011 episode of Raw, Laurinaitis was described by CM Punk during his infamous 'pipe bomb' promo as a "glad-handing, nonsensical, douchebag yes-man" who would "tell Vince McMahon everything he wants to hear". Laurinaitis subsequently made an appearance alongside McMahon as a corporate stooge during the main event of the Money in the Bank pay-per-view the following month. At the climax of the WWE Championship match, under McMahon's orders, Laurinaitis tried to duplicate the Montreal Screwjob, but defending WWE Champion John Cena then proceeded to knock Laurinaitis out, not wanting to win the match that way. This interference allowed CM Punk to win the match and the championship. The next night on Raw, Laurinaitis appeared alongside McMahon as McMahon announced an 8-man tournament to decide a new WWE Champion following Punk's departure from the company. On the August 1 episode of Raw, Laurinaitis interrupted Triple H, telling him to strip Cena of his WWE Championship, which led Cena to interrupt him and threaten to hit him again before Laurinaitis fled the ring. The following week on Raw, Laurinaitis helped Triple H officiate the contract signing between CM Punk and John Cena for their match at SummerSlam. After signing the contract, Cena flipped the table over and moved to go face to face with Punk, but was stopped by Laurinaitis. As Laurinaitis talked to Cena, Punk kicked Laurinaitis in the back of the head, causing Cena to accidentally hit Triple H instead of Punk.

Following SummerSlam, Laurinaitis began to make regular appearances on WWE programming as part of an angle in which Triple H attempted to find out who had sent a text message to the returning Kevin Nash telling him to attack CM Punk after his victory at SummerSlam, causing him to lose the WWE Championship to Alberto Del Rio who cashed in his Money in the Bank contract immediately afterwards. On the August 15 episode of Raw, Laurinaitis asked Nash for a private meeting in his office, and on the September 5 episode of Raw, after Triple H fired Nash, Laurinaitis was seen entering Nash's limo with him, leaving the arena. During this period Laurinaitis was also regularly shown sending text messages backstage and at ringside. After Nash claimed that he had sent the text message to himself, it was implied that Laurinaitis was working to try and undermine Triple H in his new role as chief operating officer, presumably because he wanted the job for himself. At Night of Champions, Laurinaitis interfered in the main event in an attempt to have Triple H removed from power but was stopped by The Miz and R-Truth, who attacked both Triple H and CM Punk, believing there to be a conspiracy. Nash also interfered in the match after Laurinaitis sent a text at ringside.

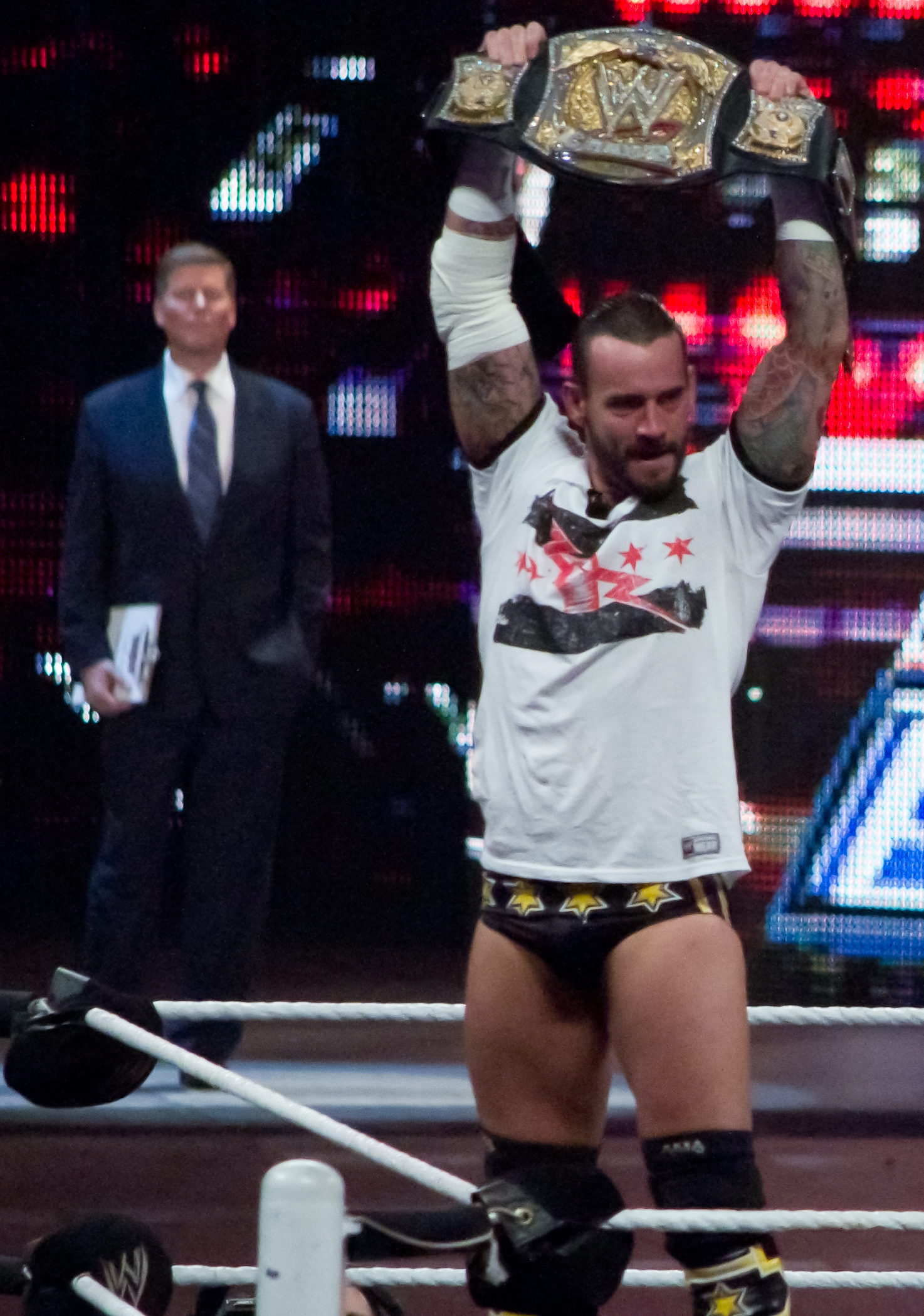
Laurinaitis, background, had a rivalry with WWE Champion, CM Punk, from late 2011 into early 2012

On the October 10 edition of Raw SuperShow, following a kayfabe strike by members of the WWE roster as a result of Triple H's management, Vince McMahon introduced Laurinaitis as the new Interim General Manager of Raw. That same night, Laurinaitis fired Jim Ross and reinstated The Miz and R-Truth, who had been suspended following repeated attacks. After a few weeks of impartiality during which he pledged that he would listen to the WWE fans using his slogan of "People Power", Laurinaitis began showing bias against WWE Champion CM Punk, who had repeatedly criticized Laurinaitis and questioned his integrity over the past few months. On the December 26 edition of Raw SuperShow, Laurinaitis placed Punk in a gauntlet match against three opponents; whoever pinned Punk would earn a shot at the WWE Championship the following week on Raw SuperShow. Punk agreed to the match under the condition that if he beat all three, then he would receive a match against Laurinaitis himself afterwards. During the match, Laurinaitis distracted Punk, allowing Dolph Ziggler to pin Punk and earn a title shot. The following week on Raw SuperShow, Laurinaitis distracted Punk once again, causing him to be counted-out in his title match against Ziggler, thus retaining the championship. Laurinaitis then scheduled a WWE Championship match between Punk and Ziggler at the Royal Rumble, in which he named himself guest referee. Laurinaitis continued to cause Punk to lose to Ziggler throughout January which ultimately led to Punk attacking Laurinaitis in retaliation, claiming that he was abusing his power. Laurinaitis began to declare himself as the soon to be permanent General Manager. In response to this, the Board of Directors ordered that his position as Interim General Manager would be taken under review by Chief Operating Officer Triple H. At the Royal Rumble, Laurinaitis brought in another official and Punk defeated Ziggler. On January 30 edition of Raw SuperShow, Laurinaitis was set to have a performance review by Triple H. During the review, Triple H degraded Laurinaitis and his actions, but before the final decision he was interrupted by The Undertaker. The Board of Directors then decided on February 7, 2012, to retain Laurinaitis as Interim General Manager.

Laurinaitis subsequently began a feud with SmackDown general manager Theodore Long. The respective General Managers of Raw and SmackDown swapped places for one night only with Laurinaitis in charge of SmackDown for March 9, 2012 and Long in charge of Raw for March 5, 2012. On that week's edition of SmackDown, Laurinaitis wrestled his first match in eleven years (as well as his first for WWE), losing to Theodore Long in a singles match. Laurinaitis continued his feud with Long until WrestleMania XXVIII, where both Long and Laurinaitis chose a team of six wrestlers to represent them, with the winning team earning general manager control over both brands. Team Johnny defeated Team Teddy, resulting in Long losing his position as General Manager of SmackDown. On the April 6, 2012 edition of SmackDown, Laurinaitis forced Long to become his new assistant after threatening to discontinue Long's grandchildren's trust fund. On the April 23, 2012 episode of Raw SuperShow, Laurinaitis appointed Eve Torres as Executive Administrator of Raw and SmackDown.

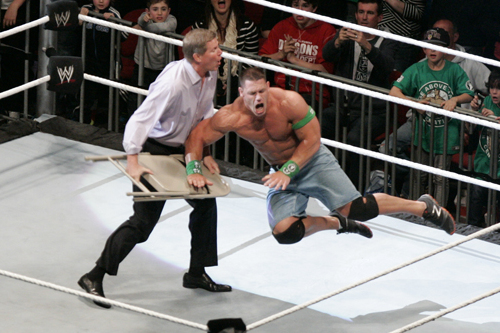
The end of Laurinaitis's role as an on-screen authority figure saw him have a rivalry with John Cena

On the April 30, 2012 episode of Raw SuperShow, Laurinaitis, with the aid of Tensai, attacked John Cena, before declaring himself as Cena's opponent at Over the Limit. On the May 14 episode of Raw SuperShow, Laurinaitis publicly humiliated and fired Big Show from WWE after Big Show disrespected him by constantly making fun of his voice. That same night, the Board of Directors sent Laurinaitis a letter stating that he would be fired if he lost the no disqualification match against Cena at Over the Limit. At Over the Limit, Laurinaitis defeated Cena despite taking a heavy beating after Big Show interfered and attacked Cena. The following night on Raw SuperShow, Laurinaitis, now using a power chair and crutches for mobility purposes, rehired Big Show after helping him win the match against Cena.

On the June 11, 2012 episode of Raw SuperShow, Vince McMahon gave Laurinaitis a job evaluation. Before McMahon could fire Laurinaitis, Big Show hit the WMD on McMahon by accident. At No Way Out, Cena defeated Big Show in a Steel Cage match. After the match, McMahon fired Laurinaitis, followed by Cena hitting the Attitude Adjustment on Laurinaitis through a broadcast table. The next night on Raw SuperShow, in his final show in charge, Laurinaitis booked himself in a 3-on-1 Handicap Match, teaming up with Big Show and David Otunga against Cena. During the match, both Big Show and Otunga walked out on Laurinaitis, which allowed Cena to hit Laurinaitis with three Attitude Adjustments before making him submit to the STF.

==== Return to road agent and sporadic appearances (2012–2020) ====
Following his tenure as an on-screen performer in 2012, Laurinaitis was relieved of his backstage executive duties and returned to his original role as a road agent. It was later stated in a 2022 Wall Street Journal investigative report into hush money payments made by Vince McMahon that his demotion occurred around the time the company reached a $1.5 million non-disclosure agreement to a woman who alleged misconduct against Laurinaitis for having an affair with her and then demoting her after their affair ended.

On the March 29, 2013 episode of SmackDown, Laurinaitis offered The Rock his services as manager for his match at WrestleMania 29 against John Cena. Rock responded by giving Laurinaitis a Spinebuster and a People's Elbow. Laurinaitis appeared at Survivor Series, alongside Los Matadores, R-Truth, Santino Marella and Fandango, and at the 2013 Slammy Awards, presenting the Rookie of the Year award to The Shield.

On SmackDown's 15th Anniversary Special on October 10, 2014, Laurinaitis formed a team to face Teddy Long's team to be determined as the greatest general manager in SmackDown history. The match was won by Teddy Long's team. He appeared at the Slammy Awards in December and, on March 28, 2015, he inducted The Bushwhackers into the WWE Hall of Fame.

Preceding the return of the brand split, Laurinaitis was one of several former authority figures to unsuccessfully apply for the general manager positions of either Raw or SmackDown. He made his appearance during the June 20, 2016 episode of Raw but was escorted off the stage by Shane McMahon.

On January 22, 2018, Laurinaitis was one of the guests that appeared on stage during the 25th Anniversary episode of Raw.

At Money in the Bank on May 10, 2020, Laurinaitis made a cameo appearance during the Men and Women's Money in the Bank match, which was filmed inside the WWE headquarters.

==== Return to Head of Talent Relations (2021–2022) ====
In March 2021, Laurinaitis was re-hired by WWE as Head of Talent Relations. In April 2022, the WWE board began investigating nondisclosure agreements related to misconduct claims by women in the company against Laurinaitis and Vince McMahon. On June 21, Laurinaitis was removed from his post and replaced by Bruce Prichard. Laurinaitis was officially let go by WWE on August 8, ending his 21-year employment with the company.

== Professional wrestling style ==
Laurinaitis is the innovator of the cutter maneuver, which he dubbed the Ace Crusher. He created the move while training with Barry Windham in 1987 and began using it a year later in All Japan Pro Wrestling. Later practitioners of the cutter include Diamond Dallas Page (who called it the Diamond Cutter) and Randy Orton (who called it the RKO).

== Personal life ==
Laurinaitis' brothers Joe, who was Animal of The Road Warriors, and Marcus were also professional wrestlers. He is also the uncle of James Laurinaitis, former linebacker for the St. Louis Rams and New Orleans Saints.

On September 3, 2015, Laurinaitis became engaged to Kathy Colace, who is the mother of The Bella Twins and the mother-in-law of former WWE champion Bryan Danielson. The two were married in a private ceremony on March 24, 2016. On the October 16, 2024 episode of The Nikki & Brie Show podcast, Colace confirmed that she and Laurinaitis were divorced.

== Sexual assault accusation ==
In January 2024, a lawsuit was filed by Janel Grant, who had been employed at WWE headquarters between 2019 and 2022. Grant alleged that Vince McMahon had coerced her into a sexual relationship, and along with Laurinaitis sexually trafficked her and repeatedly sexually assaulted her during 2020–2021. On February 1, 2024, Laurinaitis responded by releasing a statement through his attorney that accused McMahon of sexual misconduct, where he accused McMahon of holding "[p]ower, [and] control" over him and of making "dictatorial sexual demands with repercussions if not met".

== Championships and accomplishments ==
- All Japan Pro Wrestling
  - All Asia Tag Team Championship (2 times) – with Kenta Kobashi
  - World Tag Team Championship (4 times) – with Steve Williams (1), Kenta Kobashi (2) and Bart Gunn (1)
  - January 3 Korakuen Hall Heavyweight Battle Royal (1991)
  - World's Strongest Tag Determination League New Wave Award (1988) – with Dan Spivey
- Championship Wrestling from Florida
  - NWA Florida Tag Team Championship (6 times) – with The Terminator
- International Championship Wrestling Association
  - ICWA Florida Heavyweight Championship (2 times)
- Oregon Wrestling Federation
  - OWF Heavyweight Championship (1 time)
- Pro Wrestling Illustrated
  - Ranked No. 77 of the 500 best singles wrestlers in the PWI 500 in 1997
  - Ranked No. 203 of the 500 best singles wrestlers during the "PWI Years" in 2003
- WWE
  - Slammy Award (1 time)
    - WWE.com Exclusive of the Year (2011) – congratulating CM Punk
- Wrestling Observer Newsletter
  - Match of the Year (1996) with Steve Williams vs. Mitsuharu Misawa and Jun Akiyama on June 7
  - Worst Worked Match of the Year (2012) vs. John Cena on May 20
