= Royal Rumble (2011) =

World Wrestling Entertainment pay-per-view event

- Promotional poster featuring various WWE wrestlers
- Promotion: World Wrestling Entertainment
- Brand(s): Raw; SmackDown
- Date: January 30, 2011
- City: Boston, Massachusetts
- Venue: TD Garden
- Attendance: 15,113
- Buy rate: 476,000
- Tagline: The Biggest Royal Rumble in History

Pay-per-view chronology
← Previous; TLC: Tables, Ladders & Chairs	Next → Elimination Chamber

Royal Rumble chronology
← Previous; 2010	Next → 2012

The 2011 Royal Rumble was a professional wrestling pay-per-view (PPV) event produced by World Wrestling Entertainment (WWE), held for wrestlers from the promotion's Raw and SmackDown brand divisions. It was the 24th annual Royal Rumble event and took place on January 30, 2011, at the TD Garden in Boston, Massachusetts, This was the second Royal Rumble at the venue, after the 2003 event when it was known as the FleetCenter.

The event was based around the men's Royal Rumble match, a modified battle royal in which the participants enter at timed intervals instead of all beginning in the ring at the same time and the winner received a world championship match at WrestleMania. For the 2011 event, the winner received their choice to challenge for either Raw's WWE Championship or SmackDown's World Heavyweight Championship at WrestleMania XXVII. Since the second event in 1989, the Royal Rumble match traditionally had 30 participants, but for 2011, it was increased to 40. Not including the 50-man match at the standalone Greatest Royal Rumble event in April 2018, this was the largest Royal Rumble match at the annual Royal Rumble event. Following this event, the match went back to its traditional 30 participants.

Four matches were featured on the event's supercard, a scheduling of more than one main event. The main event was the 2011 Royal Rumble match, which was won by SmackDown's Alberto Del Rio, who last eliminated Raw's Santino Marella. The primary match on the Raw brand was for the WWE Championship between reigning champion The Miz and Randy Orton, which Miz won to retain. The primary match on the SmackDown brand was Edge versus Dolph Ziggler for the World Heavyweight Championship, which Edge won to retain. The other featured match on the card was an interpromotional fatal four-way match for the unbranded WWE Divas Championship in which Natalya defended the title against Eve Torres, Layla, and Michelle McCool; Torres won to win the championship.

This event was notable for the returns of Booker T, who left the company in 2007, as well as Kevin Nash in his first WWE appearance since 2003, who appeared in his Diesel persona for the first time since the 1996 event. This was also the last Royal Rumble held under the first brand extension, which ended in August, but was reinstated in July 2016.

== Production ==
=== Background ===
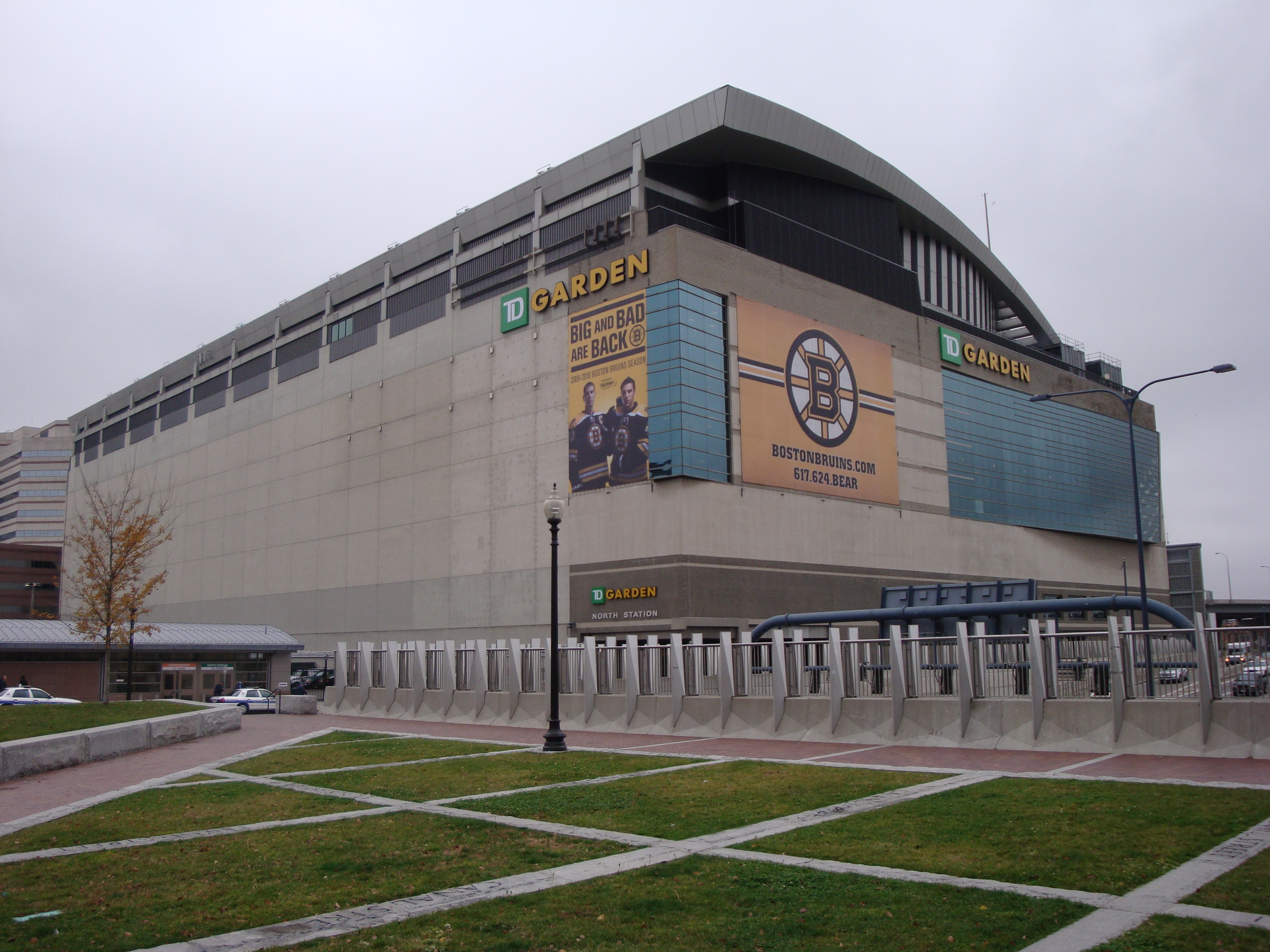
The 24th annual Royal Rumble was the second time for the event to be held at the TD Garden in Boston, Massachusetts, after the 2003 event when it was known as the FleetCenter.

The Royal Rumble is an annual professional wrestling event, produced every January by World Wrestling Entertainment (WWE) since 1988; that first event was a television special before it became a pay-per-view (PPV) event beginning in 1989. It is one of the promotion's original four pay-per-views, along with WrestleMania, SummerSlam, and Survivor Series, referred to as the "Big Four". It is named after and centered on the men's Royal Rumble match. The 24th Royal Rumble event was scheduled to be held on January 30, 2011, at the TD Garden in Boston, Massachusetts and featured wrestlers from the Raw and SmackDown brands. This was the second Royal Rumble at the venue, after the 2003 event when it was known as the FleetCenter.

The Royal Rumble match is a modified battle royal in which the participants enter at timed intervals instead of all beginning in the ring at the same time. Since 1993, the winner earns a world championship match at that year's WrestleMania. For 2011, the winner could choose to challenge for either Raw's WWE Championship or SmackDown's World Heavyweight Championship at WrestleMania XXVII. Since the second event in 1989, the Royal Rumble match has traditionally had 30 participants, but for 2011, it was increased to 40.

=== Storylines ===
The card included matches that resulted from scripted storylines. Results were predetermined by WWE's writers on the Raw and SmackDown brands, while storylines were produced on WWE's television shows, Raw and SmackDown.

In addition to the Royal Rumble match, the main rivalry from the Raw brand involved the WWE Champion The Miz defending his title against Randy Orton. The night after Survivor Series, The Miz cashed in his Money in the Bank contract and defeated Orton to become the WWE Champion before successfully defending it against Orton a month later at TLC: Tables, Ladders and Chairs. After defeating Wade Barrett and Sheamus in a Steel Cage match on an episode of Raw, Orton received another opportunity at the title in a match against The Miz.

The main rivalry from the SmackDown brand involved the World Heavyweight Champion Edge defending his title against Dolph Ziggler. After defeating "Dashing" Cody Rhodes, Drew McIntyre, and Big Show, Ziggler won a title opportunity for Edge's World Heavyweight Championship after Kane lost to Edge in his rematch. After winning his opportunity, Edge went on a campaign against Ziggler and his girlfriend, Edge's ex-wife, Vickie Guerrero. On the January 28 episode of SmackDown, Vickie Guerrero, who was the acting General Manager in place of the injured Theodore Long, banned the use of the spear and would strip him of his title if he was caught using it during his match against Ziggler.

The Divas rivalry entering the Royal Rumble was between Natalya and LayCool over the Divas Championship. Natalya defeated LayCool in a handicap match at Survivor Series to win the Divas Championship, and she would later team with Beth Phoenix in defeating LayCool in a Divas tag team Tables Match at TLC. On the December 20 episode of Raw, Melina turned heel after defeating Eve Torres and Alicia Fox in a #1 Contender's triple threat match, when she slapped Natalya after the match. On the January 24 episode, Natalya successfully defended the title against Melina, and after the match ended, LayCool entered and announced that they would cash in their rematch clause at the Royal Rumble event.

== Event ==
Other on-screen personnel
Role:	Name:
English commentators	Michael Cole
English commentators	Jerry Lawler
English commentators	Matt Striker
Spanish commentators	Carlos Cabrera
Spanish commentators	Hugo Savinovich
Interviewer	Josh Mathews
Ring announcers	Justin Roberts
Ring announcers	Tony Chimel
Referees	Mike Chioda
Referees	John Cone
Referees	Jack Doan
Referees	Justin King
Referees	Chad Patton
Referees	Charles Robinson

In a dark match prior to the pay-per-view broadcast, R-Truth defeated Curt Hawkins.

=== Preliminary matches ===
The actual pay-per-view opened with Edge defending the World Heavyweight Championship against Dolph Ziggler, with the stipulation that Edge would lose the World Heavyweight Championship should he use the Spear. Edge applied the Edgecator on Ziggler but Ziggler touched the ring ropes, forcing Edge to break the hold. Ziggler performed a Leg Drop Bulldog on Edge for a near-fall. Ziggler applied a Sleeper Hold on Edge but Edge escaped and performed an Edgecution on Ziggler. Edge pinned Ziggler, but Vickie Guerrero pulled the referee, voiding the pinfall at a two count. Whilst Kelly Kelly attacked Guerrero, Ziggler performed a Zig Zag on Edge for a near-fall. Ziggler applied another Sleeper Hold on Edge, but Edge collided with the referee, allowing Edge to perform a Spear on Ziggler. Edge performed a Killswitch on Ziggler to retain the title.

Next, The Miz defended the WWE Championship against Randy Orton. During the match, Orton attempted an RKO, but The Miz countered and attempted a Skull Crushing Finale but Orton countered and performed an Olympic Slam on The Miz. The Miz retrieved the WWE Championship belt and attempted to walk away, but Orton performed a Clothesline on The Miz. Orton performed an Elevated DDT on The Miz and The New Nexus (CM Punk, Husky Harris, Michael McGillicutty, David Otunga, and Mason Ryan) appeared. Whilst the referee was distracted by The New Nexus, Orton threw Alex Riley onto The New Nexus and the referee. Orton performed an RKO on The Miz but Punk performed a GTS on Orton. When the referee recovered, The Miz pinned Orton to retain the title.

After that, Natalya defended the WWE Divas Championship against Layla, Michelle McCool, and Eve Torres in a fatal four-way match. Natalya applied a Double Sharpshooter on Eve and Layla but McCool performed a Big Boot on Natalya. McCool attempted another Big Boot on Natalya but Natalya avoided the move, resulting in McCool hitting Layla. Eve performed a Diving Moonsault on Layla to win the title.

=== Main event ===
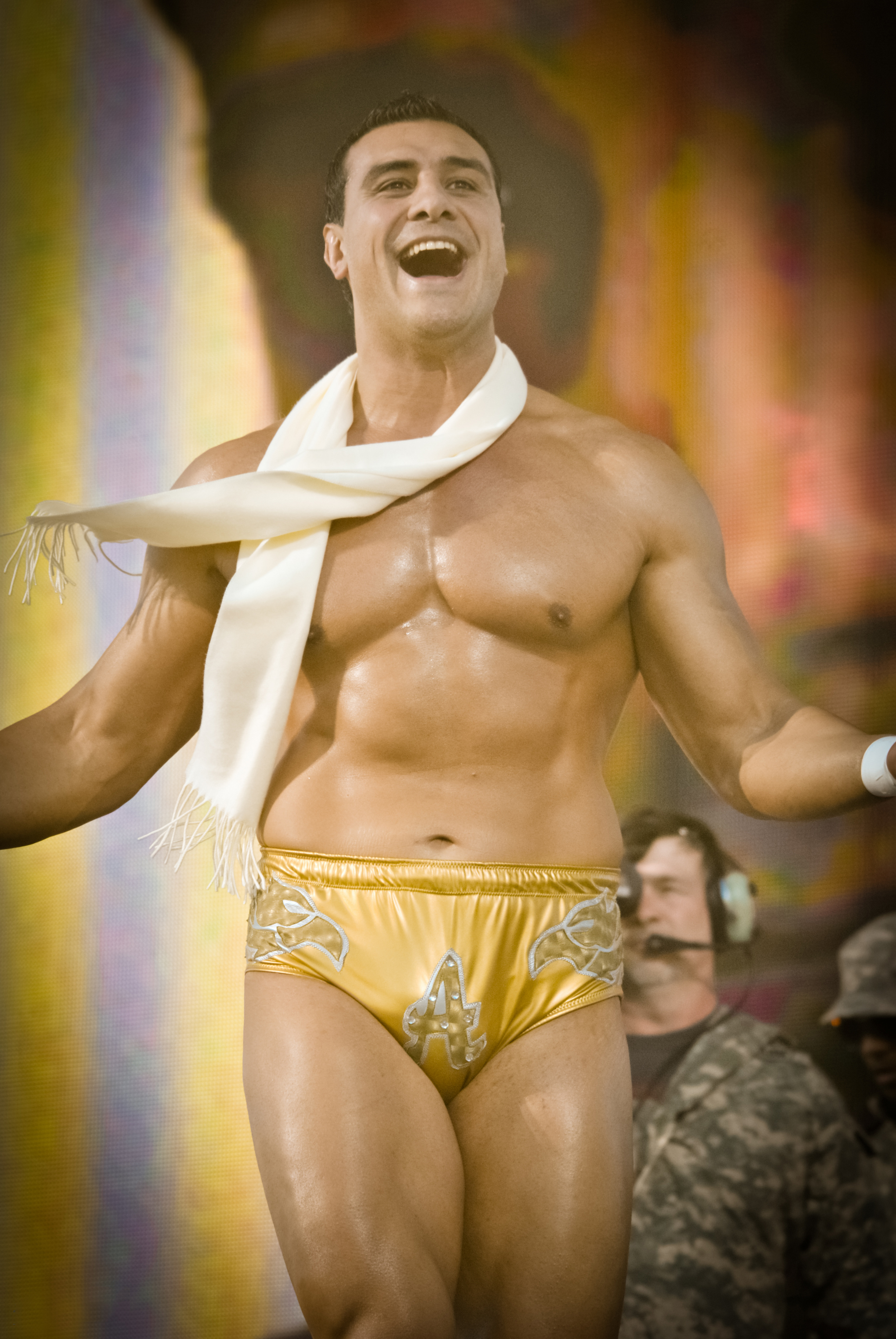
Alberto Del Rio, the Royal Rumble winner, at the 2010 Tribute to the Troops event.

The main event was the 40-man Royal Rumble match for a world championship match at WrestleMania XXVII. CM Punk entered at #1 and The Corre (Wade Barrett, Ezekiel Jackson, Justin Gabriel, and Heath Slater) then came out and attacked Punk. The New Nexus came out and fought with The Corre before the Anonymous Raw General Manager stopped the attack and threatened to disqualify both The Corre and The New Nexus from the Royal Rumble match. The members of both groups headed out backstage as Daniel Bryan entered at #2 to begin the match with Punk. Justin Gabriel entered at #3 but was quickly eliminated by Bryan. John Morrison (#7) was almost eliminated by William Regal (#5), but held onto the barricade, walked across it and jumped over to the steps to stay in the match. As the match progressed, members of The Nexus began to enter including Husky Harris (#9), Michael McGillicutty (#13) and David Otunga (#15). Punk, Harris, McGillicutty and Otunga cleared out all the other competitors in the ring (Bryan, Chris Masters (#14), Morrison and Mark Henry (#11)). Punk then went on a string of eliminations, eliminating all of the next three entries, Tyler Reks (#16), Vladimir Kozlov (#17), and R-Truth (#18). The Great Khali entered at #19 and eliminated Harris, but the final New Nexus member, Mason Ryan, came out afterwards at #20 and eliminated Khali. Booker T entered as a surprise entrant at #21, his first WWE appearance since late 2007, executing a Scissors Kick on Otunga and a Book End on McGillicutty and then performed his signature taunt, the Spinaroonie, but was eliminated by Ryan immediately afterwards. John Cena entered next at #22 and eliminated Ryan, Otunga and McGillicutty, leaving Punk on his own. After Hornswoggle entered at #23, Cena eliminated Punk (who lasted over 35 minutes and scored seven eliminations). A double-team by Cena and Hornswoggle led to Tyson Kidd (#24) and Heath Slater (#25) being quickly eliminated after Hornswoggle imitated Cena's signature moves on them.

As the ring filled up with superstars, Diesel entered at #32 as a surprise entrant, his first appearance in WWE since SummerSlam 2003, but was eliminated by Wade Barrett (#30). Alex Riley entered at #34, with The Miz coming out with him to sit on commentary. Riley was mistakenly eliminated early by Cena and Kofi Kingston (#26). Santino Marella entered at #37, but was hit with a Brogue Kick on entry by Sheamus (#28), and rolled under the bottom rope out of the ring. Alberto Del Rio entered at #38, but slowly approached the ring. This led to the next entrant, Randy Orton, coming out and attacking Del Rio before throwing him into the ring. Orton executed an RKO on Sheamus and another one on Kingston before eliminating both. Kane entered as the final competitor at #40 and eliminated Ezekiel Jackson (#36). Kane was eliminated by Rey Mysterio (#29), but Mysterio was then eliminated himself by Barrett.

Cena, Barrett, Del Rio, and Orton were left as the assumed final four. Riley, who was eliminated earlier, came back out and distracted Cena, which allowed The Miz, who had still been on commentary, to eliminate Cena from behind, and he rushed backstage with Riley. Orton fought with Barrett and Del Rio, gaining the upper hand and executing his signature moves. Orton eliminated Barrett, but Del Rio quickly eliminated Orton immediately afterwards and began celebrating. However, Marella, who had been laying outside the ring ever since he was struck by Sheamus' Brogue Kick, came back into the ring after the referees realised he was still in. Del Rio turned around confused and was hit by the Cobra and Marella began celebrating prematurely. Marella went for the elimination on Del Rio, but Del Rio managed to roll out of the way at the last moment, pulling Marella over the top rope and eliminating him to finally win the match. This Royal Rumble match was the longest in its history until the 50-man Royal Rumble match at Greatest Royal Rumble surpassed it in 2018.

== Reception ==
Royal Rumble received positive reviews, most notably from Arda Ocal and Jim Korderas of Right After Wrestling on SIRIUS Radio 98, who called it one of the best Royal Rumble matches in recent memory. SLAM! Wrestling writers Dale Plummer and Nick Tylwalk shared similar compliments to the event, praising the short, though crowd-pleasing appearances of Kevin Nash and Booker T. Overall, they also awarded the event a score of 8.5/10. The event received 476,000 buys, up from the previous year's 465,000.

== Aftermath ==
In April 2011, the promotion ceased using its full name with the "WWE" abbreviation becoming an orphaned initialism. In August, the brand split was dissolved, thus the 2011 Royal Rumble was the last Royal Rumble held during the first brand extension. However, the brand split would be reinstated in July 2016. Additionally, the 2011 Royal Rumble has thus far been the only Royal Rumble match at the annual event to have 40 participants. Only one other Royal Rumble match has had more participants, which was the 50-man Greatest Royal Rumble match held at the standalone Greatest Royal Rumble event in April 2018. Although similar and although the match had the same rules, it was not part of the Royal Rumble's PPV chronology.

== Results ==
No.	Results	Stipulations	Times
1^{D}	R-Truth defeated Curt Hawkins	Singles match	—
2	Edge (c) defeated Dolph Ziggler (with Vickie Guerrero) by pinfall	Singles match for the World Heavyweight Championship; Had Edge used the Spear, he would have lost the title.	20:45
3	The Miz (c) (with Alex Riley) defeated Randy Orton by pinfall	Singles match for the WWE Championship	19:50
4	Eve Torres defeated Natalya (c), Michelle McCool, and Layla by pinfall	Fatal four-way match for the WWE Divas Championship	5:05
5	Alberto Del Rio won by last eliminating Santino Marella	40-man Royal Rumble match for a world championship match at WrestleMania XXVII	1:09:53
(c) / – the champion(s) heading into the match; D / – this was a dark match

=== Royal Rumble entrances and eliminations ===
– Raw
– SmackDown
– Legend
– Winner

Draw	Entrant	Brand	Order	Eliminated by	Time	Eliminations
1	CM Punk	Raw	21	John Cena	35:21	7
2	Daniel Bryan	Raw	8	CM Punk	20:55	2
3	Justin Gabriel	SmackDown	1	Daniel Bryan	00:58	0
4	Zack Ryder	Raw	2	Daniel Bryan	00:43	0
5	William Regal	Raw	3	Ted DiBiase	04:10	0
6	Ted DiBiase	Raw	7	Michael McGillicutty, Husky Harris	12:16	1
7	John Morrison	Raw	10	CM Punk, David Otunga, Michael McGillicutty, Husky Harris	13:24	0
8	Yoshi Tatsu	Raw	5	Mark Henry	05:35	0
9	Husky Harris	Raw	15	The Great Khali	15:48	3
10	Chavo Guerrero	SmackDown	4	Mark Henry	02:01	0
11	Mark Henry	Raw	11	CM Punk, David Otunga, Michael McGillicutty, Husky Harris	07:04	2
12	JTG	SmackDown	6	Michael McGillicutty	01:48	0
13	Michael McGillicutty	Raw	20	John Cena	15:07	4
14	Chris Masters	SmackDown	9	CM Punk	01:58	0
15	David Otunga	Raw	19	John Cena	11:56	2
16	Tyler Reks	SmackDown	12	CM Punk	00:34	0
17	Vladimir Kozlov	Raw	13	CM Punk	00:40	0
18	R-Truth	Raw	14	CM Punk	01:02	0
19	The Great Khali	Raw	16	Mason Ryan	01:17	1
20	Mason Ryan	Raw	18	John Cena	04:32	2
21	Booker T	Legend	17	Mason Ryan	01:08	0
22	John Cena	Raw	36	The Miz^{1}	34:17	7
23	Hornswoggle	SmackDown	24	Sheamus	09:39	0
24	Tyson Kidd	Raw	22	John Cena	00:53	0
25	Heath Slater	SmackDown	23	John Cena	00:57	0
26	Kofi Kingston	SmackDown	31	Randy Orton	26:04	1
27	Jack Swagger	SmackDown	25	Rey Mysterio	04:41	0
28	Sheamus	Raw	32	Randy Orton	20:49	1
29	Rey Mysterio	SmackDown	35	Wade Barrett	22:34	2
30	Wade Barrett	SmackDown	37	Randy Orton	21:23	2
31	Dolph Ziggler	SmackDown	27	Big Show	07:12	0
32	Diesel	Legend	26	Wade Barrett	02:45	0
33	Drew McIntyre	SmackDown	29	Big Show	04:46	0
34	Alex Riley	Raw	28	John Cena, Kofi Kingston	02:50	0
35	Big Show	SmackDown	30	Ezekiel Jackson	01:30	2
36	Ezekiel Jackson	SmackDown	33	Kane	07:14	1
37	Santino Marella	Raw	39	Alberto Del Rio	12:54	0
38	Alberto Del Rio	SmackDown	-	Winner	09:33	2
39	Randy Orton	Raw	38	Alberto Del Rio	08:18	3
40	Kane	SmackDown	34	Rey Mysterio	01:36	1

^{1} The Miz was not a participant in the match.
