= Extreme Rules (2011) =

WWE pay-per-view event

- Promotional poster featuring John Cena
- Promotion: WWE
- Brand(s): Raw; SmackDown
- Date: May 1, 2011
- City: Tampa, Florida
- Venue: St. Pete Times Forum
- Attendance: 10,000
- Buy rate: 209,000

Pay-per-view chronology
← Previous; WrestleMania XXVII	Next → Over the Limit

Extreme Rules chronology
← Previous; 2010	Next → 2012

The 2011 Extreme Rules was a professional wrestling pay-per-view (PPV) event produced by WWE. It was the third annual Extreme Rules event and took place on May 1, 2011, at the St. Pete Times Forum in Tampa, Florida, held for wrestlers from the promotion's Raw and SmackDown brand divisions. The theme of the event was that it featured various hardcore-based matches.

The event's card consisted of eight matches, seven of which were contested under a hardcore stipulation, and there was also one dark match that occurred before the live broadcast. The main event saw John Cena defeat defending champion The Miz and John Morrison in a Triple Threat Steel Cage match to win Raw's WWE Championship. In the other main promoted matches, Christian defeated Alberto Del Rio in a ladder match to win SmackDown's vacant World Heavyweight Championship, Kofi Kingston defeated Sheamus in a tables match to win SmackDown's United States Championship, and in the opening bout, Randy Orton defeated CM Punk in a Last Man Standing match.

The event received 209,000 pay-per-view buys, up from last year's event of 182,000 buys. This was the second Extreme Rules event to not feature the titular Extreme Rules match after the inaugural 2009 event. It was also notable for the WWE debut of Kharma, formerly known as Awesome Kong in Total Nonstop Action Wrestling. This was WWE's first PPV event to be held in Tampa since Survivor Series in 2000. It was the last Extreme Rules held under the first brand extension, which ended in August but was reinstated in July 2016. It was also the company's first PPV event to be promoted under its shortened trade name of WWE, as following WrestleMania XXVII the previous month, the company ceased using its full name of World Wrestling Entertainment, although that remains the legal name of the company.

== Production ==
=== Background ===
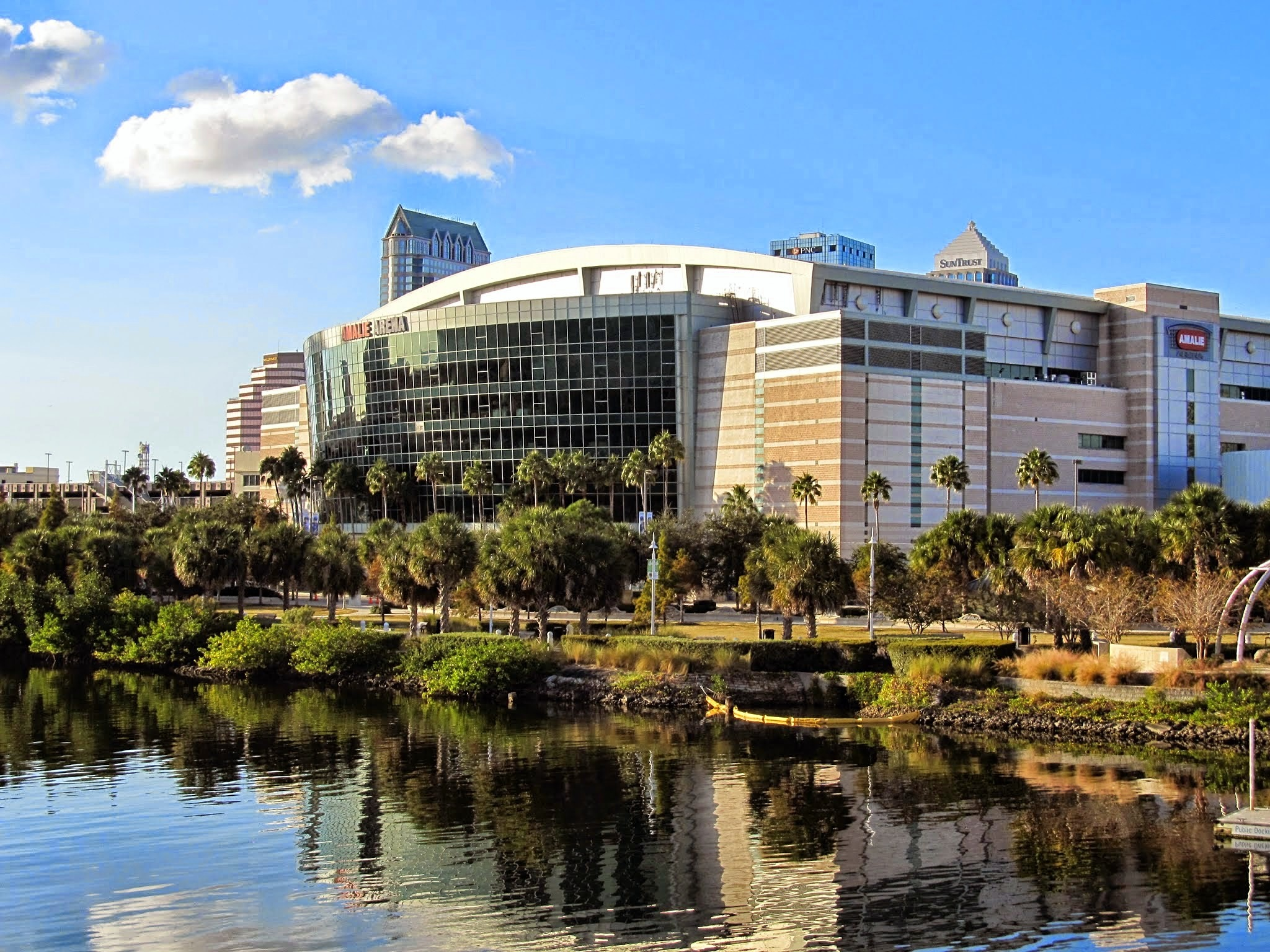
The third annual Extreme Rules event was held at the St. Pete Times Forum in Tampa, Florida.

Extreme Rules was an annual professional wrestling pay-per-view (PPV) event produced by WWE since 2009. The concept of the event was that it featured various matches that were contested under hardcore rules and generally featured one Extreme Rules match. The defunct Extreme Championship Wrestling promotion, which WWE acquired in 2003, originally used the "extreme rules" term to describe the regulations for all of its matches; WWE adopted the term, using it in place of "hardcore match" or "hardcore rules". The third Extreme Rules event was scheduled for May 1, 2011, at the St. Pete Times Forum in Tampa, Florida and featured wrestlers from the Raw and SmackDown brands. Tickets went on sale on December 18, 2010.

This was WWE's first PPV event held to be promoted under its shortened trade name of WWE, as following WrestleMania XXVII the previous month, the company ceased using its full name of World Wrestling Entertainment, although that remains the legal name of the company.

=== Storylines ===
The professional wrestling matches at Extreme Rules involved professional wrestlers performing as characters in scripted events pre-determined by the hosting promotion, WWE. Results were predetermined by WWE's writers on the Raw and SmackDown brands, while storylines were produced on WWE's weekly television shows, Raw and SmackDown.

Edge was originally scheduled to defend his World Heavyweight Championship against Alberto Del Rio in a ladder match. However, Edge retired on the April 11 episode of Raw due to a cervical spinal stenosis stemming from his neck injury. The match was scrapped and the title was vacated on the April 15 episode of SmackDown. Later, Edge's best friend, Christian, won a 20-man battle royal to face Del Rio in the ladder match for the title. In the interim, Del Rio was drafted to Raw in the 2011 WWE Draft.

On the April 11 episode of Raw, John Cena, Randy Orton, John Morrison, Dolph Ziggler, and R-Truth fought in a gauntlet match to determine the number one contender for The Miz's WWE Championship. Cena and Truth became the last two men remaining, but were attacked by The Miz and his protégé Alex Riley, resulting in a double disqualification. Afterwards, the anonymous Raw general manager announced that The Miz would defend his title against Cena and Truth at Extreme Rules, with the match later scheduled to be contested in a steel cage. The following week, Morrison (who had been eliminated by Truth in the gauntlet match) confronted Truth about his capability of competing in the match and challenged him to a match for his spot, which Truth accepted. Morrison won, thus replacing Truth at Extreme Rules. Truth then turned heel by viciously attacking Morrison afterwards, then lighting a cigarette and blowing smoke into Morrison's face.

An ongoing feud involved Raw commentators Michael Cole and Jerry Lawler. At WrestleMania XXVII, Lawler had made Cole submit to the ankle lock, but the anonymous Raw General Manager reversed the decision, thus making Cole the winner via disqualification. On the April 11 episode of Raw, Lawler defeated Cole's trainer, Jack Swagger, allowing him to team up with his former broadcast partner, Jim Ross, to face Cole and Swagger at Extreme Rules. Two weeks later, the Raw General Manager decided that the match would be a Country Whipping match.

Another feud pitted the members of LayCool against each other. Dissension between Layla and Michelle McCool started on the April 8 episode of SmackDown when Michelle refused to tag Layla in a tag team match against Beth Phoenix and Kelly Kelly. Also, tension grew since they failed to get back the WWE Divas Championship several times and lost a six-person tag-team match at WrestleMania XXVII against Trish Stratus, John Morrison, and Snooki from Jersey Shore. The following two weeks, the two attended couple's therapy sessions, but the latter session ended with McCool attacking Layla, solidifying their break up. During the 2011 WWE Draft, after Layla lost her match against Eve, she attacked McCool for distracting her. On the April 29 episode of SmackDown, after fighting to a double count-out in their match, Layla and McCool agreed to have a No Count-out, No Disqualification match at Extreme Rules with the loser leaving WWE.

Another feud involved Rey Mysterio and Cody Rhodes. At WrestleMania XXVII, Cody Rhodes had defeated Rey Mysterio by using his protective face mask, followed by Cross Rhodes. On the April 22 episode of SmackDown, Rhodes and Mysterio would have a rematch; however, Mysterio defeated Rhodes. After the match, Rhodes attacked Mysterio from behind, performed a Cross Rhodes on a concrete floor, and put a paper bag on Mysterio. A Falls Count Anywhere match between the two was scheduled for Extreme Rules.

Two matches were added to the card during the event. SmackDown General Manager Theodore Long added a match between Sheamus and Kofi Kingston for the WWE United States Championship. Also a lumberjack match pitting the WWE Tag Team Champions, Big Show and Kane, against Wade Barrett and Ezekiel Jackson was added.

== Event ==
Other on-screen personnel
Role:	Name:
English Commentators	Michael Cole (Matches 6 - 9)/Raw
English Commentators	Jerry Lawler (Orton vs. Punk)
English Commentators	Booker TSmackDown
English Commentators	Josh Mathews SmackDown/Raw
Spanish Commentators	Carlos Cabrera
Spanish Commentators	Marcelo Rodriguez
Backstage interviewer	Todd Grisham
Ring announcers	Justin Roberts
Ring announcers	Tony Chimel
Referees	Charles Robinson
Referees	Mike Chioda
Referees	John Cone
Referees	Scott Armstrong
Referees	Justin King

Before the event went on air, Sin Cara defeated Tyson Kidd in a non-televised dark match.

=== Preliminary matches ===
The first televised match saw CM Punk taking on Randy Orton in a Last Man Standing match. While Punk made his way to the ring with the members of The New Nexus, the Anonymous Raw General Manager declared that the members of The New Nexus were banned from ringside. After a back and forth match for quite some time, Punk brought in kendo sticks and the two proceeded to beat one another with them. After both men abandoned the use of the kendo sticks, Punk threw Orton into the exposed metal turnbuckle. The match then spilled to the matted area around the ring where Orton performed a snap scoop powerslam. At approximately ten minutes into the match, Punk executed a GTS on Orton, who barely managed to stand. The match was moved back into the ring where Punk performed a scoop slam to Orton on top of a chair. Orton executed the RKO on Punk, but Punk managed to stand. After going outside of the ring again, Punk put a chair around Orton's neck and drove him into the ring post. Orton then delivered an RKO on the broadcast table to Punk, with Punk again managing to stand. Punk then executed a variation of the GTS on Orton on the steel steps. Back in the ring, Punk ascended to the top rope only to be caught by Orton, who repeatedly hit him with a kendo stick. After abandoning the kendo stick, Orton managed to execute an RKO from the top rope on Punk. Punk could not answer the count and the referee declared Orton the winner.

Before the second match, in a backstage segment, SmackDown general manager Theodore Long informed Sheamus that he would be defending the WWE United States Championship against Kofi Kingston in a tables match. Sheamus executed the Brogue Kick and Kingston delivered the Trouble in Paradise but they both managed to not go through the tables. Kingston put Sheamus through a table with a Boom Drop off the top rope, winning his second United States Championship and returning the title back to Raw.

The following match was a tag team Country Whipping match pitting Michael Cole and Jack Swagger against WWE Hall of Famers, Jerry Lawler and Jim Ross. Swagger and Cole dominated the match early on until Lawler made the hot tag to Ross. After taking Cole down, Ross applied the AnCole lock, but Swagger entered the ring and pulled Ross off of Cole. Ross used a leather strap to deliver a low blow to Swagger, but was then pinned with a schoolboy by Cole for the win.

The next match pitted Cody Rhodes and Rey Mysterio against one another in a Falls Count Anywhere match. Mysterio ran off the entrance ramp and executed a seated senton on Rhodes. The brawl then headed backstage where Mysterio tackled Rhodes into a stand. The finish came when Mysterio spit mist into Rhodes' face, delivered the 619 and a springboard splash for the pin.

=== Main event matches ===
After that, Layla fought Michelle McCool in a no disqualification, no countout, Loser Leaves WWE match. The match started with McCool attacking Layla during her entrance routine. McCool was then able to deliver the Faith Breaker, but her pin was reversed by Layla into a crucifix for the win. After the match, the debuting Kharma attacked McCool with an Implant Buster.

The vacant World Heavyweight Championship was contested between Christian and Alberto Del Rio in a ladder match. During the match, Christian backdropped Del Rio onto a ladder. Del Rio was able to perform an enzuigiri on Christian, knocking him off the top rope. Del Rio then attempted to free the championship, but was unsuccessful. About sixteen minutes into the match, Christian used a spear on Del Rio as a tribute to Edge. After Christian was about to unhook the championship, Brodus Clay ran down to ringside, preventing Christian from winning the match. Clay began to bleed after taking a shot from a ladder and then thrown to the outside by Christian. After this, Del Rio applied the cross armbreaker on Christian and began scaling the ladder. However, Del Rio was distracted by a car horn coming from a jeep driven by Edge. Christian took advantage of this and knocked Del Rio off the ladder onto Brodus Clay and Ricardo Rodriguez at ringside. Christian went on to retrieve the World Heavyweight Championship. Edge then celebrated with Christian in the ring.

Next, Kane and Big Show defended the WWE Tag Team Championship against Wade Barrett and Ezekiel Jackson in a lumberjack match. In the end, Barrett tagged himself in once Jackson had Big Show down but was caught by Big Show and then suffered a chokeslam for the win.

In the last match of the pay-per-view, The Miz defended the WWE Championship against John Cena and John Morrison in a steel cage triple threat match. The match started with Morrison and Cena teaming up against The Miz. Cena executed a diving bulldog on the Miz from the top rope, while Morrison tried to escape the cage, only to be stopped by Cena. As Morrison made another attempt to escape, The Miz stopped him. Cena performed the Five Knuckle Shuffle on Morrison, but Miz delivered the Skull Crushing Finale to Cena. The Miz tried to climb the cage but was, again, teamed up on by Morrison and Cena as they performed a double suplex from the top of the cage on Miz. Morrison then tried a variation of the Flying Chuck using the cage wall instead of the ropes, aiming for Cena, but hit The Miz instead. Morrison executed a standing moonsault side slam on Cena, but was powerbombed into the steel cage wall by The Miz. Cena then applied the STF on The Miz as he tried exiting the ring by the door, but Morrison climbed the cage and shut the door, which hit The Miz. Cena then pushed Morrison who landed on the door on his groin. Back in the ring, The Miz executed a DDT on Cena, and executed a big boot. As Morrison tried to escape the cage, both Cena and The Miz tried to stop him, but Morrison performed the Starship Pain from the top of the cage. Later in the match, Morrison was about to escape the cage to win the WWE Championship, when R-Truth came to ringside and attacked Morrison. He then took Morrison back into the ring and began repeatedly attacking him, finally ending the assault with the What's Up. R-Truth went on to deliver a Truth Axe on Cena before climbing over the cage. The match ended as Cena executed an Attitude Adjustment on The Miz from the top rope for the pinfall victory, winning his eighth WWE Championship.

== Reception ==
Extreme Rules 2011 received extremely positive reviews. In his review for The Sun, Rob McNichol reported that the event was "a stunning return to form by WWE". CM Punk and Randy Orton's opening Last Man Standing Match was deemed a very strong opening bout. The Country Whipping match was described as "unsatisfying and slow" while Rey Mysterio vs Cody Rhodes was hailed as "a high quality wrestling match". Kharma's debut was heralded as a special moment sorely lacking from recent WWE PPVs. The SmackDown main event Ladder Match between Alberto Del Rio and Christian for the vacant World Heavyweight Championship was given praise, "The crowd's genuine elation and the celebration with his [Edge] former partner and best friend made it a very special moment. Both were great and Christian's title win was something that should have happened a long time ago". John Morrison's performance was praised as "stunning". "The high-risk moves and Starship Pain of the top of the cage proves why Morrison is a future star in WWE." The Sun gave praise in some matches calling them outstanding and "Extreme", McNichol said that the event lived up to its name, the Last Man Standing match was rated 9 out of 10, the World Championship Ladder match a 9.5 out of 10 and the WWE Championship Steel Cage was rated 9 out of 10, and rated the show 9.5 out of 10 overall.

== Aftermath ==
The president has just announced that we have caught, and compromised to a permanent end, Osama bin Laden.
–John Cena

Following the conclusion of Extreme Rules, news was breaking worldwide that Osama bin Laden had been killed by U.S. troops. WWE Champion John Cena addressed the live audience at the event with a speech about the events and American pride. Cena's announcement was replayed the next evening on Raw in Miami, where Lilian Garcia performed the national anthem in the beginning of the show. Dwayne Johnson also addressed the issue prior to his birthday celebration and led the crowd in a recitation of the Pledge of Allegiance.

After attacking Michelle McCool at the event, Kharma would attack female wrestlers on both the Raw and SmackDown brands with Layla fleeing. Meanwhile, Michelle McCool retired after this event.

The night after Extreme Rules, The Miz invoked his rematch clause the following night on Raw. He originally won the match by hitting Cena with the WWE Championship belt due to outside interference from Alex Riley, but after referee Mike Chioda saw The Miz drop the WWE Championship belt in the ring, Chioda told ring announcer Justin Roberts to reverse the decision that The Miz was disqualified and Cena retained the championship via disqualification. On the May 9 episode of Raw, The Miz defeated Rey Mysterio and Alberto Del Rio to earn another shot at the WWE Championship. After the match, Cena announced that their match would be an "I Quit" match. 13 days later at Over the Limit, Cena defended the WWE Championship against and defeated The Miz in an "I Quit" match after the match was restarted due to the referee noticing interference from Alex Riley.

This was the final Extreme Rules held under the first brand split, which ended in August, but was reinstated in July 2016.

== Results ==
No.	Results	Stipulations	Times
1^{D}	Sin Cara defeated Tyson Kidd by pinfall	Singles match	—
2	Randy Orton defeated CM Punk	Last Man Standing match The New Nexus were banned from ringside.	20:06
3	Kofi Kingston defeated Sheamus (c)	Tables match for the WWE United States Championship	9:09
4	Michael Cole and Jack Swagger defeated Jerry Lawler and Jim Ross by pinfall	Country Whipping match	7:04
5	Rey Mysterio defeated Cody Rhodes by pinfall	Falls Count Anywhere match	11:43
6	Layla defeated Michelle McCool by pinfall	No Disqualification, No Countout Loser Leaves WWE match	5:24
7	Christian defeated Alberto Del Rio	Ladder match for the vacant World Heavyweight Championship	21:05
8	Big Show and Kane (c) defeated The Corre (Wade Barrett and Ezekiel Jackson) by pinfall (Note: Lumberjacks included Byron Saxton, Conor O'Brian, Darren Young, David Hart Smith, Evan Bourne, Heath Slater, Jacob Novak, Johnny Curtis, Justin Gabriel, Lucky Cannon, Primo, Santino Marella, Titus O'Neil, Trent Beretta, Tyler Reks, Vladimir Kozlov, and Yoshi Tatsu.)	Lumberjack match for the WWE Tag Team Championship	4:15
9	John Cena defeated The Miz (c) and John Morrison by pinfall	Triple Threat Steel Cage match for the WWE Championship	19:50
(c) / – the champion(s) heading into the match; D / – this was a dark match
