= WrestleMania XXVII =

2011 World Wrestling Entertainment pay-per-view event

- Promotional poster featuring Rey Mysterio, John Cena, The Undertaker, The Miz, Triple H, Randy Orton, and host The Rock
- Promotion: World Wrestling Entertainment
- Brand(s): Raw; SmackDown
- Date: April 3, 2011
- City: Atlanta, Georgia
- Venue: Georgia Dome
- Attendance: 71,617
- Buy rate: 1,124,000
- Tagline: "The Biggest WrestleMania Ever"

Pay-per-view chronology
← Previous; Elimination Chamber	Next → Extreme Rules

WrestleMania chronology
← Previous; XXVI	Next → XXVIII

WrestleMania XXVII was a 2011 professional wrestling pay-per-view (PPV) event produced by World Wrestling Entertainment (WWE). It was the 27th annual WrestleMania and took place on April 3, 2011, at the Georgia Dome in Atlanta, Georgia, held for wrestlers from the promotion's Raw and SmackDown brand divisions. This was the first WrestleMania held in the U.S. state of Georgia and the second to be held in Southeastern United States, after WrestleMania XXIV in 2008 in Florida. Dwayne "The Rock" Johnson served as the host of the event.

The event's card consisted of eight matches, including three main matches. The final match of the event was the main match from Raw, where The Miz defeated John Cena to retain the WWE Championship thanks to help from The Rock, setting up the main event of WrestleMania XXVIII between Rock and Cena. SmackDown's main match saw Edge defeat Alberto Del Rio to retain the World Heavyweight Championship—this would be Edge's final match until 2020. In the other marquee match, The Undertaker defeated Triple H in a No Holds Barred match to extend his undefeated WrestleMania streak to 19–0. This was the first and so far only WrestleMania in which no championships changed hands.

Tickets for the event commenced sale to the public on November 13, 2010. According to WWE's second-quarter earnings report, WrestleMania XXVII generated 1,059,000 PPV buys, up roughly 30% domestically and 15% internationally from the previous year. The event grossed US$6.6 million in revenue with 71,617 in attendance, making it the third highest-grossing event in WWE behind WrestleMania 25 and the next year's event WrestleMania XXVIII. It generated $62.1 million in economic impact for Atlanta, a $17 million increase from the previous WrestleMania event, and also generated approximately $7.8 million in local, state, and county taxes.

Critically, the event received a mixed reception. Praise went towards the World Heavyweight Championship match, Mysterio vs. Rhodes, Punk vs. Orton, and Triple H vs. The Undertaker. Criticism went towards the tag matches, Cole vs. Lawler and the main event. This was the final WrestleMania held during the first brand extension, which ended in August, but was reinstated in July 2016. This was also the company's final event to be promoted under the full name of World Wrestling Entertainment, as immediately following this event, the company strictly began to refer to itself solely by the WWE abbreviation.

== Production ==
=== Background ===
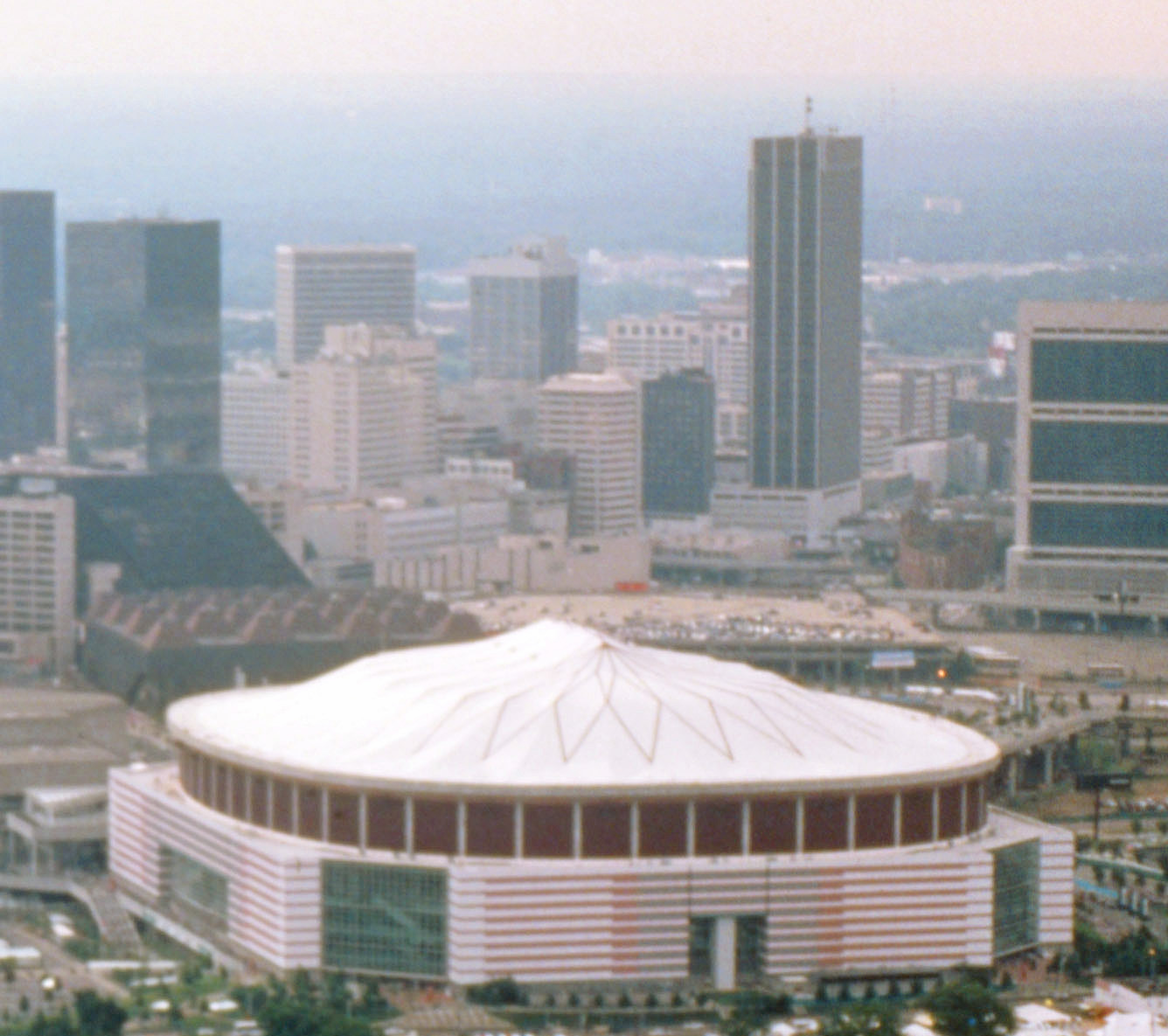
The 27th annual WrestleMania was held at the Georgia Dome in Atlanta, Georgia.

WrestleMania is considered World Wrestling Entertainment's (WWE) flagship professional wrestling pay-per-view (PPV) event, having first been held in 1985. It has become the longest-running professional wrestling event in history and is held annually between mid-March to mid-April. It was the first of WWE's original four pay-per-views, which includes Royal Rumble, SummerSlam, and Survivor Series, referred to as the "Big Four". WrestleMania XXVII was scheduled to be held on April 3, 2011, at the Georgia Dome in Atlanta, Georgia and featured wrestlers from the Raw and SmackDown brands.

In September 2009, it was reported that the city of Atlanta was seeking to host WrestleMania XXVII at the Georgia Dome. Atlanta's main rival bid came from the city of Miami, Florida, which proposed to host the event at Sun Life Stadium along with WrestleMania Axxess at the Miami Beach Convention Center and the WWE Hall of Fame ceremony at the American Airlines Arena. Miami would eventually become the host for WrestleMania XXVIII. Atlanta was formally announced as the site at a press conference on February 1, 2010. According to WWE's senior vice president of special events, John Saboor, Atlanta was ultimately chosen for, among other reasons, "their track record of success with large events, rich in its tradition with the WWE, and great infrastructure". The event marked the first time WrestleMania was held in the U.S. state of Georgia.

Along with WrestleMania XXVII, a series of events grouped as "WrestleMania Week" was held in the week preceding the event including WrestleMania's annual WrestleMania Axxess fan convention, the 2011 WWE Hall of Fame ceremony, the fourth annual WrestleMania Art exhibition and auction, and a Celebrity Pro-Am Golf tournament. WrestleMania Axxess was held at the Georgia World Congress Center, while the WWE Hall of Fame ceremony took place at the Philips Arena. It was the first pay-per-view event under WWE's promotional rights deal with Kmart. Under the deal, Kmart was the official sponsor for all of WWE's live events in the United States for the rest of 2011. As another part of the promotion for the event, WWE Magazine released a "Guide to WrestleMania XXVII" app for the iPhone, iPod Touch, and iPad, offering information about the upcoming event as well as trivia from past events.

"Written in the Stars" by Tinie Tempah was the theme song for the event. "Diamond Eyes (Boom-Lay Boom-Lay Boom)" by Shinedown served as the secondary theme song, while R&B singer Keri Hilson performed "America the Beautiful" at the start of the show. Celebrities and former wrestlers that appeared in WrestleMania XXVII segments include Snoop Dogg, Pee Wee Herman, Gene Okerlund, Mae Young, and Roddy Piper. In addition, the WWE Hall of Fame Class of 2011 inductees made an appearance, including the headliner Shawn Michaels, Jim Duggan, The Road Warriors, Sunny, Bob Armstrong, Abdullah the Butcher, and celebrity Drew Carey.

On August 13, 2011, a one-hour special including the opening segment, the Triple H vs. Undertaker match, and the post-WrestleMania confrontation between The Rock and John Cena was broadcast on NBC under the title WrestleMania XXVII: The World Television Premiere.

=== Storylines ===
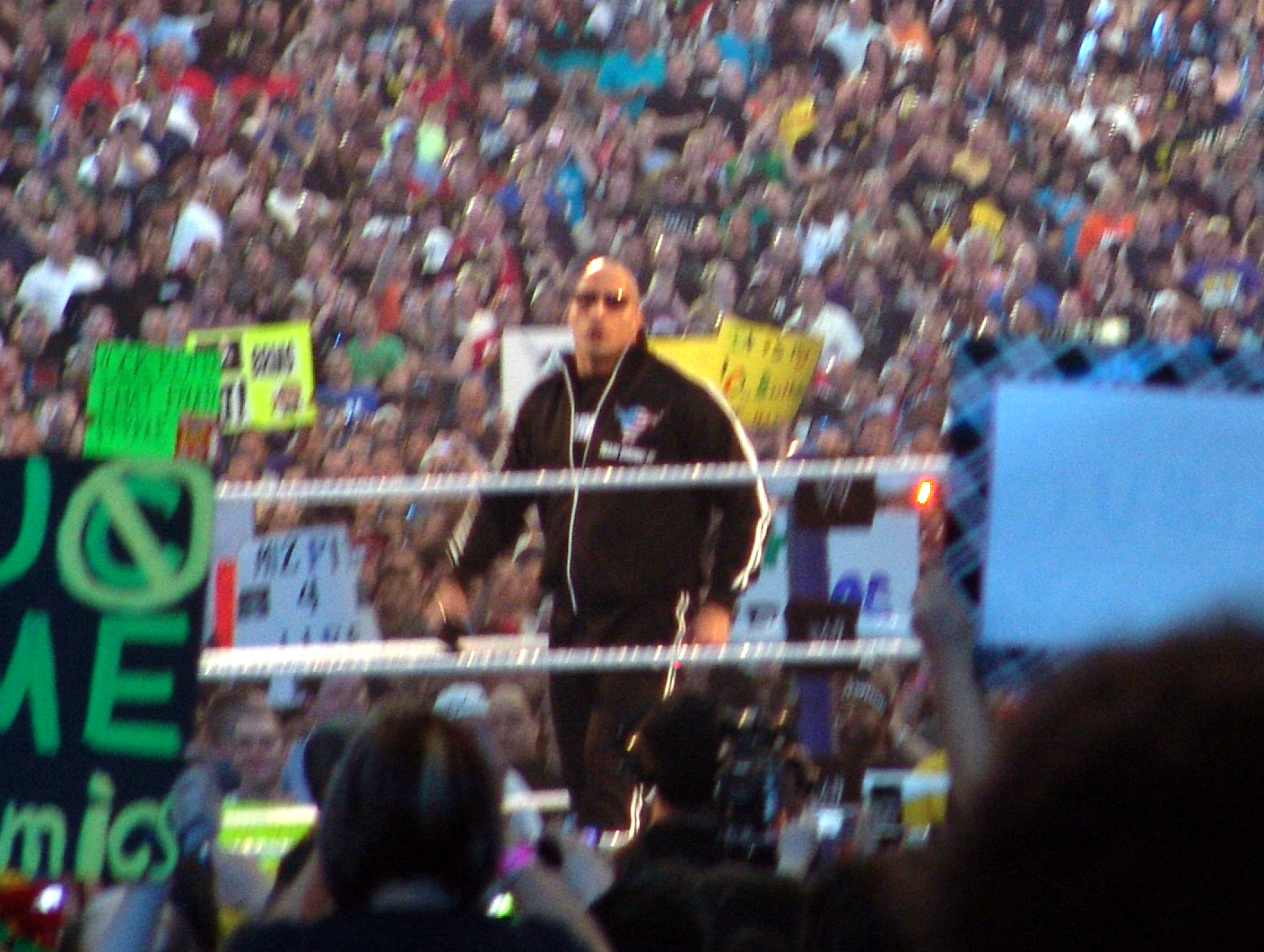
The Rock was the special guest host for WrestleMania XXVII.

The event included matches that resulted from scripted storylines. Results were predetermined by WWE's writers on the Raw and SmackDown brands, while storylines were produced on WWE's weekly television shows, Raw and SmackDown.

The predominant rivalry for the Raw brand involved Dwayne "The Rock" Johnson, John Cena, and the reigning WWE Champion, The Miz. On the February 14 episode of Raw, The Rock was announced as host for WrestleMania XXVII. In his first appearance in a WWE ring in seven years, The Rock publicly mocked both The Miz and Cena. At the following week's Elimination Chamber event, Cena won the Raw brand's annual Elimination Chamber match to earn himself a WWE Championship opportunity against The Miz. One night later on Raw, both Cena and The Miz derided The Rock's previous comments, with Cena producing a rap questioning The Rock's true commitment to WWE over his acting career. Via satellite, The Rock responded to Cena's rap on the February 28 episode of Raw, citing that he started a movie career to help open the door for other wrestlers to go to Hollywood, including The Miz and Cena himself. On the March 28 episode, The Rock and Cena confronted each other face to face before WrestleMania, until The Miz came out. The Miz and his protégé, Alex Riley, attacked The Rock, who managed to fight back both men. After the assault, Cena performed an Attitude Adjustment on The Rock to end the show.

Starting from the January 31 episode of Raw, mysterious vignettes began promoting the return of a mysterious wrestler on "2.21.11". On the February 21 episode, The Undertaker was revealed as the mysterious figure, who made his return after a four-month absence. However, The Undertaker's return was interrupted by a returning Triple H. The two men stared each other down and both peered at the WrestleMania sign, teasing a possible challenge at WrestleMania XXVII. The match was confirmed four days later on WWE's official website. This match marks the second time the two would face each other at a WrestleMania, the first being WrestleMania X-Seven ten years earlier. Before their WrestleMania match, both men had a face to face encounter on the March 28 episode of Raw, only to be interrupted by Shawn Michaels, who criticized Triple H for believing that he could defeat The Undertaker at WrestleMania, something that Michaels wasn't able to do at the previous years' event. After The Undertaker stated that Michaels was history, Michaels attempted to perform a Superkick on him, but The Undertaker retaliated with a Chokeslam that was stopped by Triple H, who then asked Michaels why he is going to defeat The Undertaker at WrestleMania. Michaels, however, left the ring, unable to give Triple H an answer, believing that Triple H couldn't defeat The Undertaker at the event.

Since 1993, the winner of the annual Royal Rumble match at the January event of the same name has won the opportunity to fight for a world championship at WrestleMania. Alberto Del Rio won the match in 2011 and challenged Edge for the World Heavyweight Championship. This led to a series of assaults from Del Rio to Edge in the following weeks. However, Edge was joined by the returning Christian, who aided Edge from Del Rio and his bodyguard Brodus Clay, and proceeded to be in Edge's corner at WrestleMania.

In December 2010, Raw color commentator Jerry Lawler began a feud with fellow announcer Michael Cole when the anonymous Raw General Manager gave Lawler a WWE Championship match in a Tables, Ladders, and Chairs match against defending champion The Miz. As Lawler started to climb the ladder to retrieve the belt, Cole interfered and prevented Lawler from winning the match. On the February 21 edition of Raw, Cole mocked Lawler for losing his rematch against The Miz at Elimination Chamber as well as his dreams of having a WrestleMania match, going as far as even mentioning Lawler's mother who died weeks earlier. Lawler responded by challenging Cole to a match at WrestleMania, which Cole denied before running through the crowd. A week later, Cole accepted Lawler's challenge under two conditions – that his trainer Jack Swagger would be in his corner, and that he could choose a special guest referee – which Lawler accepted. The following week, Cole revealed John "Bradshaw" Layfield (JBL) as the special guest referee. However, "Stone Cold" Steve Austin, who made his return that night, interfered in the contract signing by delivering a Stone Cold Stunner to JBL and signing the contract himself, thereby becoming the special guest referee of their match. Cole continued to insult Lawler on the following weeks, even bringing Lawler's son Brian Christopher, who insulted Lawler, and calling him a bad father, before slapping him in the face and leaving. After that, Jim Ross, Lawler's best friend, confronted Cole and called him a "rat bastard", for which Swagger attacked Ross, and later Lawler, who attempted to save Ross.

Another plot building up towards WrestleMania involved CM Punk and Randy Orton. At the beginning of the year, Punk became the leader of The New Nexus. At the Royal Rumble pay-per-view, Punk cost Orton his WWE Championship match against defending champion The Miz. The following night on Raw, Orton retaliated by assaulting Punk's fellow New Nexus members Michael McGillicutty and Husky Harris, resulting in Harris being punted in the head. On the February 7 episode of Raw, Punk revealed that his actions were his revenge on Orton for punting him in the head at Unforgiven in September 2008, where Punk was unable to defend his World Heavyweight Championship due to Orton's attack and subsequently forced to vacate his title. At Elimination Chamber, Orton eliminated Punk from the Raw Elimination Chamber match, however the anonymous Raw general manager reverted the fall as Punk's pod door malfunctioned; Punk then re-entered the match later on and eliminated Orton. On February 28, the anonymous Raw general manager scheduled a match between Punk and Orton at WrestleMania. In addition, the General Manager announced that Orton would face one of the members of the New Nexus throughout the following weeks. If Orton lost, his opponents would be allowed to be in Punk's corner at WrestleMania; if he won, his opponent would be banned from attending the event. Orton won all of his matches, so Michael McGillicutty, David Otunga, and Mason Ryan were all banned from ringside at the event. After each victory, Orton would punt each member in the head in order to send a message to Punk. On the March 21 episode of Raw, Punk distracted Orton during his "WrestleMania Rewind" match with Rey Mysterio and used Orton's wife as bait to lure him to the parking lot, where he attacked Orton's knee with a wrench. The following week, on the Raw before WrestleMania, both men brawled with each other, which ended after Punk performed a Go To Sleep on Orton after taking advantage of his injured knee.

Another feud heading into WrestleMania was between Rey Mysterio and Cody Rhodes. On the January 21 episode of SmackDown, Mysterio and Rhodes had a match in which Mysterio broke the nose of Rhodes with the 619. Rhodes, who underwent facial reconstruction surgery, later accused Mysterio of forcing him to miss the Royal Rumble match and the Elimination Chamber match for the World Heavyweight Championship, as well as ruining his 'dashing' gimmick. On the February 25 episode, Cody's father, Dusty Rhodes, came out to talk to Mysterio and asked Rhodes to apologize for his accusation, but it turned out to be a setup to allow Rhodes to attack and unmask Mysterio. The next week Rhodes challenged Mysterio to a match at WrestleMania, which was accepted by Mysterio. The following week, Rhodes attacked Mysterio again, during Mysterio's match against Drew McIntyre. However, Mysterio retailed the following week, attacking Rhodes, until Rhodes escaped the ring.

On the March 14 episode of Raw, Nicole "Snooki" Polizzi appeared as a guest star and exchanged insults with Vickie Guerrero backstage. Later that night, Vickie defeated Trish Stratus with the help of LayCool (Michelle McCool and Layla). After the match, Snooki, who observed the match at ringside, took down LayCool after being provoked by McCool. A brawl ensued between Snooki & Stratus and LayCool until LayCool retreated from the ring. Vickie then proposed a six-person mixed tag team match at WrestleMania between LayCool & her boyfriend, Dolph Ziggler, and Snooki, Stratus, and John Morrison which Snooki accepted. In the buildup to the match, a vignette aired, showing Snooki and Stratus in a bar, where Stratus said that they were training for their WrestleMania match. On the vignette, Snooki fought a man, and later Snooki and Stratus fought LayCool on the bar after LayCool started mocking Snooki and Stratus.

In an eight-man tag team match, The Corre (Wade Barrett, Ezekiel Jackson, Justin Gabriel and Heath Slater) were originally scheduled to wrestle Big Show, Kane, Santino Marella and Vladimir Kozlov at WrestleMania. The Corre had been going after Show on SmackDown, but Show and Kane joined forces to beat down The Corre on Raw two weeks before WrestleMania. Later, Kane and Show helped Kozlov & Marella fend off an attack by The Corre. On April 2, after a WrestleMania Axxess match between Kozlov and Tyler Reks, The Corre attacked Kozlov, leaving his shoulder injured. Kofi Kingston, who recently lost the Intercontinental Championship to Barrett, was chosen as Kozlov's replacement.

== Event ==
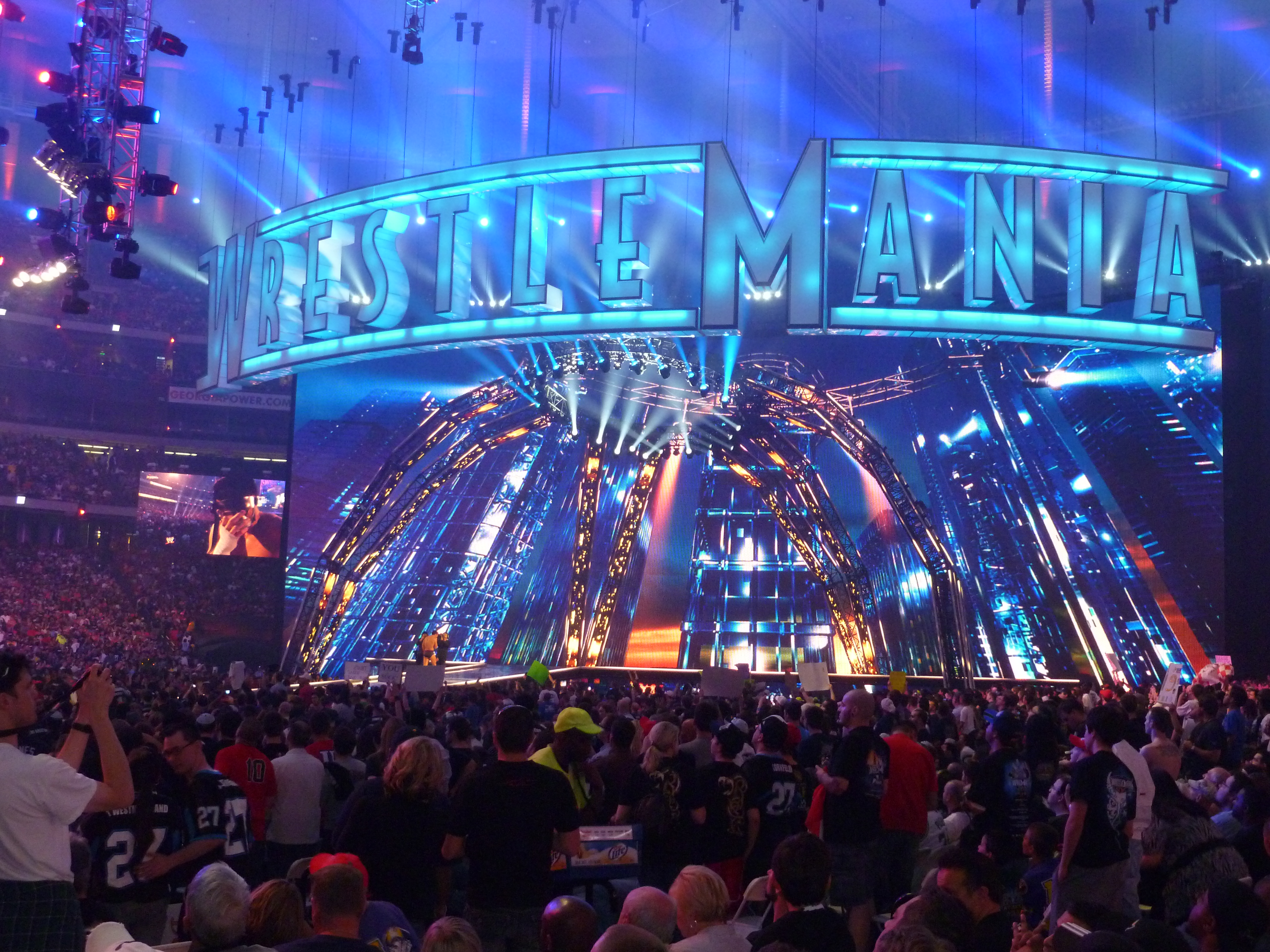
71,617 fans pack Georgia Dome for WrestleMania XXVII.

Other on-screen personnel
Role:	Name:
English commentators	Michael Cole
English commentators	Jerry Lawler
English commentators	Josh Mathews
English commentators	Jim Ross
English commentators	Booker T
Spanish commentators	Carlos Cabrera
Spanish commentators	Hugo Savinovich
Interviewers	Todd Grisham
Interviewers	Matt Striker
Host	The Rock
Ring announcers	Justin Roberts (Main Show)
Ring announcers	Howard Finkel (Hall of Fame)
Referees	Scott Armstrong
Referees	Steve Austin
Referees	Mike Chioda
Referees	John Cone
Referees	Jack Doan
Referees	Justin King
Referees	Chad Patton
Referees	Charles Robinson

=== Pre-show ===
Before the event aired, two dark matches took place. The first match pitted Sheamus against Daniel Bryan in a lumberjack match for the United States Championship. During the match, a brawl broke out between the lumberjacks outside the ring, resulting in the match ending in a no contest. SmackDown General Manager Theodore Long then called for a battle royal to take place. The Great Khali won the match after last eliminating Sheamus.

=== Preliminary matches ===
As the show went live on pay-per-view, R&B singer Keri Hilson performed "America the Beautiful". Soon after, The Rock, the guest host, walked to the ring and cut a promo, mocking John Cena as well as firing up the crowd for WrestleMania.

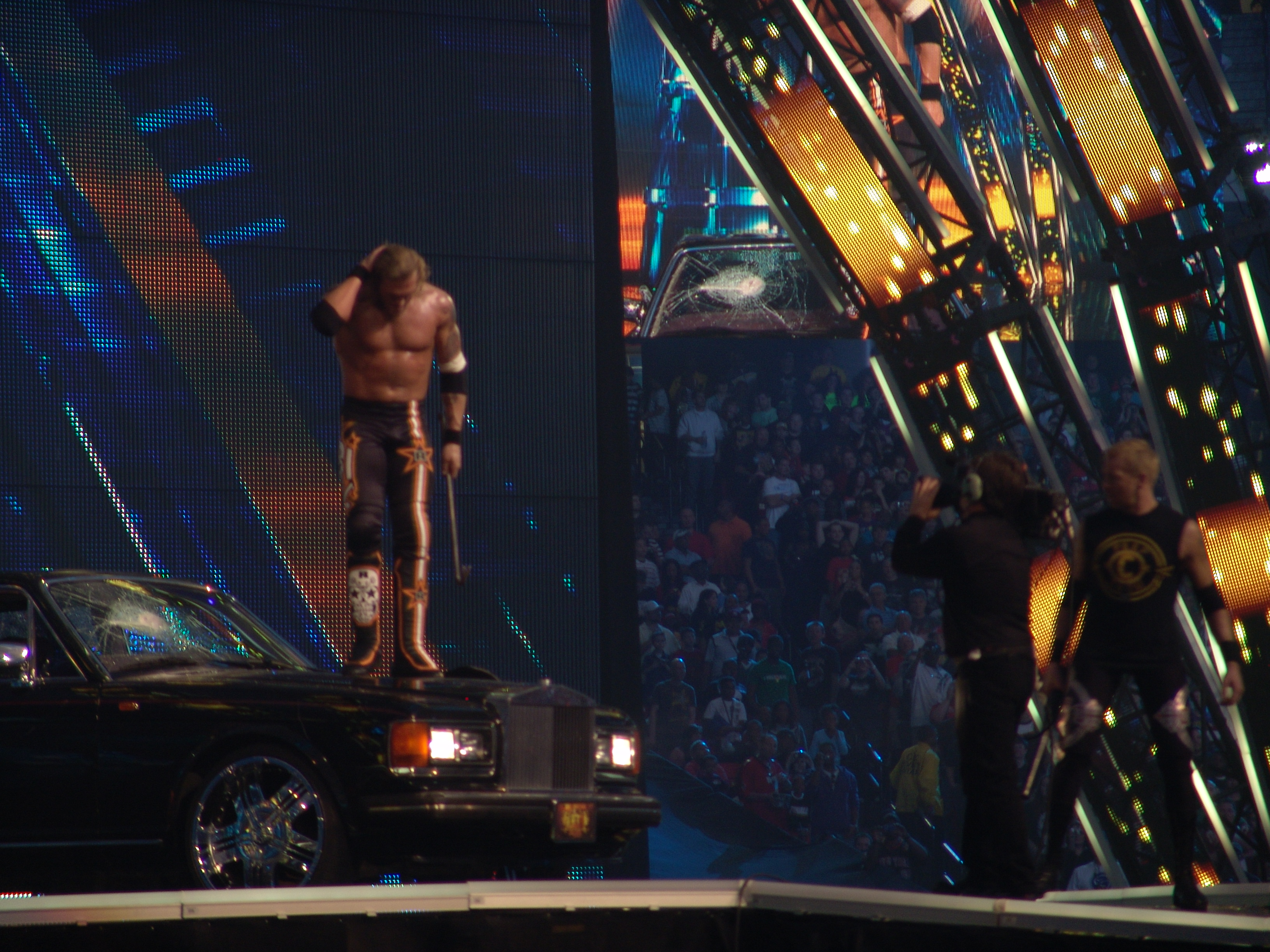
After SmackDown's World Heavyweight Championship match, Edge destroyed Alberto Del Rio's car at WrestleMania XXVII.

In the first match, Edge (with Christian) defended the World Heavyweight Championship against the 2011 Royal Rumble winner Alberto Del Rio (with Ricardo Rodriguez and Brodus Clay). Early in the match, Del Rio focused on Edge's injured arm and Christian fended off Clay and Rodriguez. After some back and forth action, the ending came when Edge applied the Edgecator while Del Rio applied the Cross Armbreaker. When both men got up, Edge delivered the Spear for the win. After the match, Edge and Christian destroyed Del Rio's car. This was Edge's last televised match, as he retired the next week on Raw due to a legitimate neck injury. Edge has since been medically cleared to wrestle again, returning to in-ring competition nearly 9 years later at the 2020 Royal Rumble.

The next match pitted Cody Rhodes against Rey Mysterio, who came out dressed as Captain America. Rhodes dominated most of the match, however, Mysterio managed to gain control later on. The ending saw Mysterio removed Rhodes' face mask and deliver headbutts but Rhodes countered by removing Mysterio's knee brace. When Mysterio went for a dive, Rhodes knocked out Mysterio with the knee brace and executed the Cross Rhodes for the win.

In the next match, Kane, Big Show, Santino Marella, and Kofi Kingston faced The Corre (Wade Barrett, Ezekiel Jackson, Heath Slater, and Justin Gabriel) in an eight-man tag team match. The match lasted ninety seconds, ending with Slater receiving a Cobra from Santino and a WMD from Big Show. Big Show then pinned Slater to win.

In the next match, Randy Orton faced CM Punk, with the New Nexus banned from ringside. Punk spent most of the match focusing on Orton's injured knee until Orton gained control later in the match. Orton then attempted a punt kick, but his injured knee stopped him. Punk attempted the GTS, but Orton went for an RKO. Punk dodged and went for a Springboard clothesline, but Orton delivered an RKO for the win.

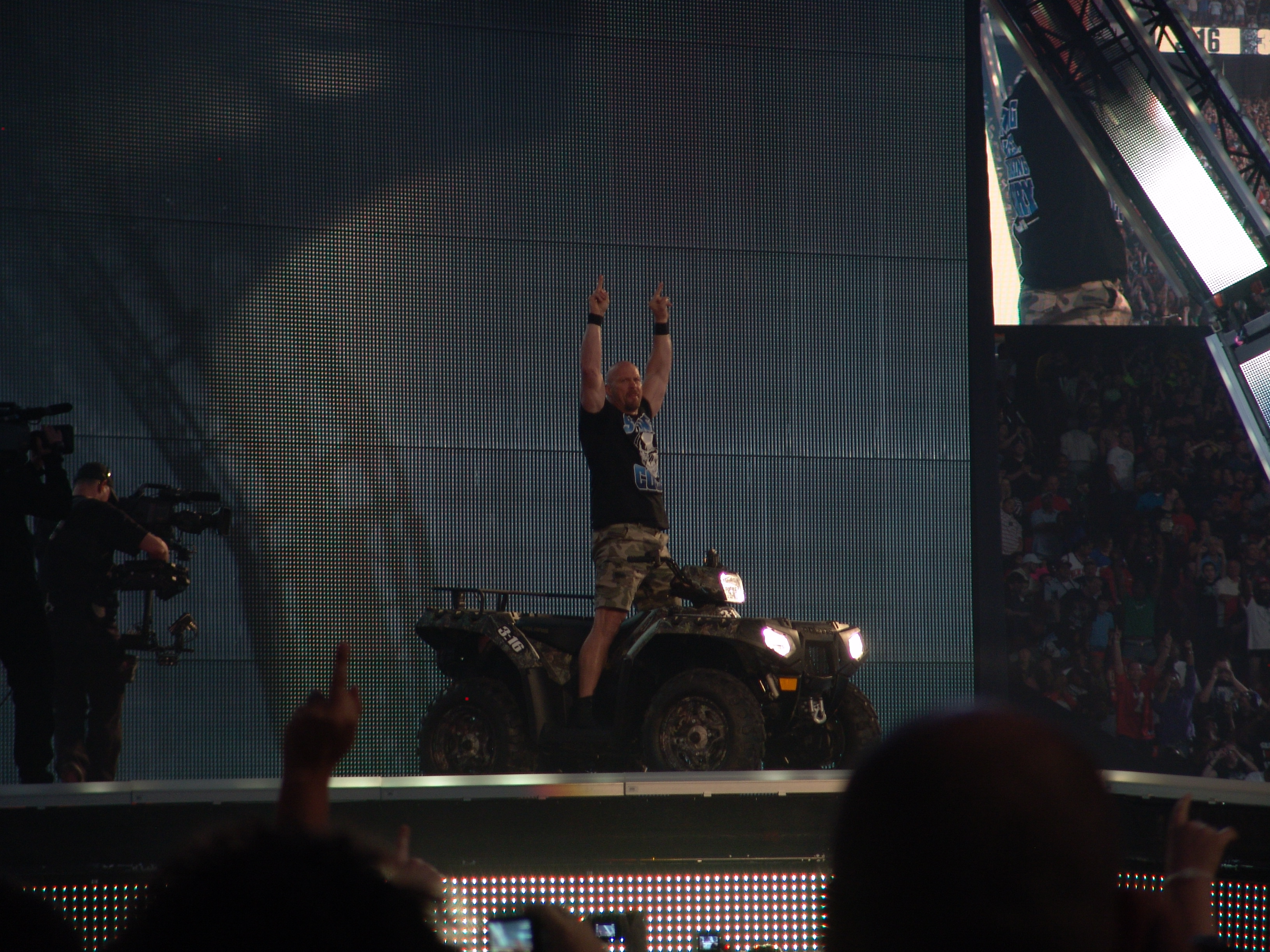
"Stone Cold" Steve Austin returned with his ATV at WrestleMania XXVII.

In the next match, Michael Cole (with Jack Swagger) faced Jerry Lawler, with "Stone Cold" Steve Austin as the special guest referee. For this match, Booker T and Jim Ross joined Josh Mathews on commentary. The match began with Lawler trying to get Cole out of his "Cole Mine", a small glass box that Cole would announce from. After some time, he did so and started attacking him. Cole managed to counter and had the upper hand on Lawler for most of the match. Swagger tried to help Cole by throwing in the towel when Lawler began to take control but was denied and received a Stone Cold Stunner. Lawler then forced Cole to submit with the ankle lock while Austin mocked him. After the match, Austin shared a beer with Lawler and stunned Booker T, who came out to celebrate with Lawler. After Lawler had seemingly won, the Anonymous Raw General Manager reversed the decision in an email read by Mathews because Austin was a biased referee, making Cole the winner by disqualification. Austin then proceeded to stun Mathews as well in retribution. Lawler then replaced Mathews and Booker T as the color commentator for the rest of the night, with Jim Ross doing the play-by-play.

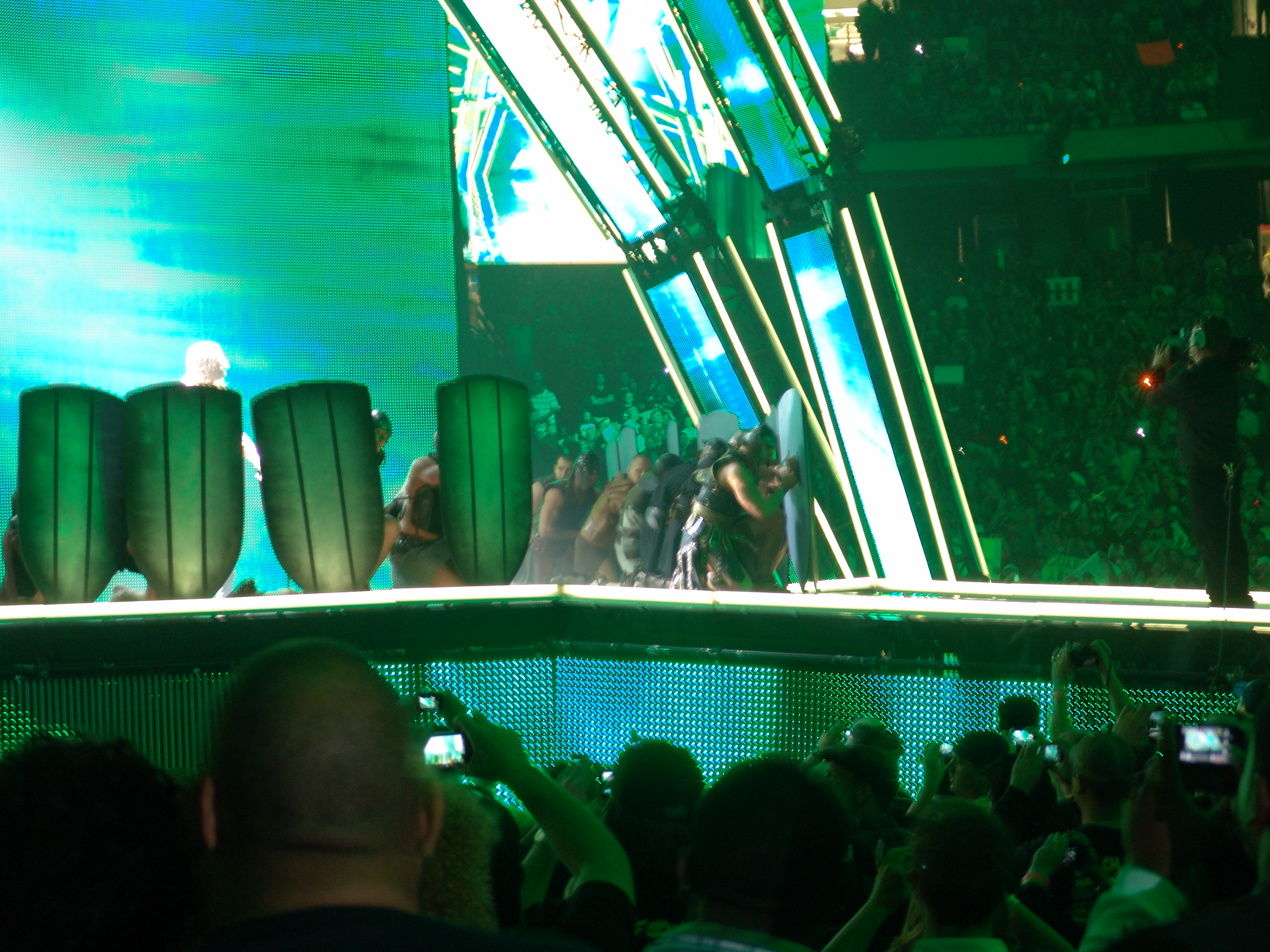
Triple H performing his entrance at WrestleMania XXVII, walking between shields

In the next match, The Undertaker faced Triple H in a No Holds Barred match. Triple H entered to "For Whom The Bell Tolls" by Metallica wearing a mask and suit, then removed it for his normal entrance theme. The Undertaker entered to "Ain't No Grave" by Johnny Cash wearing a hat and suit, although this is replaced with his original entrance music on the WWE Network. The match began with The Undertaker and Triple H brawling outside of the ring, destroying Michael Cole's "Cole Mine" in the process. Triple H delivered a spinebuster to The Undertaker through a broadcast table. The match went back and forth, as The Undertaker delivered a Chokeslam and a Last Ride, but Triple H kicked out of both. After, Triple H performed a Pedigree for a near-fall. The Undertaker then performed the Tombstone Piledriver for a near-fall. Triple H then hit The Undertaker with a chair to the head and delivered a DDT on the chair. After more back and forth action, Triple H executed a second Pedigree for another near-fall. Triple H immediately delivered the third Pedigree for a near-fall. After many steel chair shots, and telling Undertaker to stay down, Triple H executed The Undertaker's Tombstone Piledriver for a near-fall. Triple H then grabbed a sledgehammer, but The Undertaker applied Hell's Gate on Triple H. Eventually, Triple H submitted, meaning The Undertaker's WrestleMania streak continued to 19–0. The record was displayed on stadium screens. After the match, WWE Medical Staff had to help The Undertaker after he collapsed outside the ring and couldn't walk under his own power. The Undertaker later revealed in an interview in 2021 that the ending of the match was scripted and that Vince McMahon hated this ending.

The penultimate match was a six-person mixed tag team match, which saw John Morrison, Trish Stratus, and Nicole "Snooki" Polizzi competing against a team consisting of Dolph Ziggler and LayCool (Michelle McCool and Layla). The match lasted a few minutes, with the ending coming when Morrison delivered Starship Pain on the outside of the ring to Ziggler and Snooki performed a cartwheel splash on McCool to get the win for her team.

=== Main event ===
In the last match, The Miz (accompanied by Alex Riley) defended the WWE Championship against John Cena. During the match, Cena delivered the Five Knuckle Shuffle to The Miz. Cena attempted the Attitude Adjustment, but The Miz countered with a DDT. There was a lot of back and forth action until The Miz executed the Skull Crushing Finale and Cena executed an Attitude Adjustment on The Miz – both for near-falls. Both men fought outside of the ring, knocking each other out in the process, and were counted out. The Rock came out to intervene, when an email message from the Anonymous Raw General Manager arrived. The Rock went to read it, but then disregarded it and restarted the match under "no disqualifications, no count-outs, no time limits" stipulations. Cena dragged The Miz back inside the ring and attempted an Attitude Adjustment. The Rock stalked Cena from behind and performed a Rock Bottom on him, in vengeance for the Attitude Adjustment from the episode of Raw that aired six nights prior. Taking advantage, The Miz then pinned Cena for the win, retaining the WWE Championship, and became only the third heel to win in the main event of WrestleMania. After the match, The Rock had a staredown with The Miz until The Rock delivered a spinebuster and a People's Elbow. WrestleMania XXVII went off the air with The Rock posing on top of the turnbuckles for the fans.

== Reception ==
WrestleMania XXVII received mixed reviews from critics. Canadian Online Explorer's professional wrestling section gave the entire event 6.5 out of 10. The World Heavyweight Championship match received an 8 out of 10, the Undertaker–Triple H match received an 8.5 out of 10, the WWE Championship match received a 5 out of 10 and the CM Punk–Randy Orton match received a 7 out of 10.

The attendance record for WrestleMania XXVII was announced as 71,617. WWE's number was later confirmed by officials at the Georgia Dome.

The match between Michael Cole and Jerry Lawler is considered one of the worst WrestleMania matches of all time, as well as one of the worst in WWE. Dave Meltzer gave the match 1 star out of 5. Vince McMahon himself stated to Michael Cole after the match that it was "the worst thing [he'd] ever witnessed in 60 years." The match was criticized by fans for being too long, involving a non-wrestler in Cole and for the Anonymous Raw General Manager's reversing of Lawler's initial victory.

== Aftermath ==
=== Raw ===
The following night on Raw, John Cena and The Rock agreed to face each other in a match at WrestleMania XXVIII, marking the first time a match had been announced almost a year in advance for any WrestleMania. Later on Cena won the WWE Championship in a Triple Threat Steel Cage match against The Miz and John Morrison at Extreme Rules. The Raw after Extreme Rules, Cena defended the WWE Championship against The Miz in a singles match after being restarted due to the referee noticing interference from Alex Riley after Miz winning, and again later on in an "I Quit" match at Over the Limit against The Miz. Later in a backstage segment Cena "congratulated" The Rock on his birthday, telling him to bring it on for WrestleMania while showing off the WWE Championship, implying that their match at WrestleMania XXVIII would be for the WWE Championship, continuing on with their feud. However, Cena would go on to lose the WWE title three times that year, twice to CM Punk, and once to Alberto Del Rio. In November, at Survivor Series, Cena teamed with The Rock, which would be the latter's first match since WrestleMania XX in 2004 (which coincidentally was at Madison Square Garden in New York City), and defeated the Miz and R-Truth, only for Rock giving a Rock Bottom on Cena after the match. The Rock defeated Cena at WrestleMania XXVIII, and, in 2013, a rematch at WrestleMania 29 took place, with The Rock's WWE Championship on the line, which saw Cena emerging victorious.

The Miz suffered a legitimate concussion in the main event, being knocked out when Cena tackled him to the concrete for the double-countout, and largely doesn't remember the match. The concussion remains the worst of Miz's career, the only other time he was legitimately knocked out being by Kofi Kingston at Madison Square Garden in 2012.

Michael Cole and Jerry Lawler's feud continued as they appeared on that same night Edge had retired from WWE. Cole was locked in a glass box staying off contact with Lawler while Jim Ross made his return only for Jack Swagger to show up and made it as a singles match where Lawler defeated Swagger. Cole addresses Lawler that their rematch was the "Country Whipping match" in a form of Tag Team at Extreme Rules and Lawler accepted as he team up with Ross, but lost to Cole again. Finally, their last match to end their feud in Over The Limit was the "Kiss My Foot Match" as Lawler defeated Cole to end his heel turn and goes back to having friends with Lawler.

As a consequence of using a chair shot to the head, Triple H and The Undertaker were legitimately fined by WWE for violating the company's "concussion policy" at the event. After a ten-month hiatus, The Undertaker returned on January 30, 2012, episode of Raw to confront Triple H before challenging him to a rematch at WrestleMania XXVIII, having felt unsatisfied with having to leave victorious not under his own power. After Triple H refused despite insistence from Shawn Michaels, The Undertaker mocked him by calling him a coward and knowing that Michaels was better than him. This angered Triple H to the point that he finally accepted The Undertaker's challenge, but under the stipulation that their match be a Hell in a Cell match. Soon after the match was made, Michaels confirmed he would officiate the match as special guest referee. The Undertaker defeated Triple H at WrestleMania XXVIII with their match dubbed as an "End of an Era" and extended his Undefeated WrestleMania Streak to 19–0.

=== SmackDown ===
On the April 11 Raw, Edge retired due to a legitimate neck injury, marking his last match for the company against Del Rio at WrestleMania. Edge vacated the World Heavyweight Championship on the April 15 episode of SmackDown, therefore retiring as world champion and leaving WWE full-time to make part-time appearances for the company. At Extreme Rules, Christian won the title for the first time in a ladder match against Del Rio, only to lose the title to Randy Orton, on the May 6 episode of SmackDown. The next year Edge would be inducted into the WWE Hall of Fame. However after nine years and two neck surgeries, Edge returned as a surprise entrant in the men's Royal Rumble match at the 2020 Royal Rumble, and then entered into a feud with Randy Orton. Starting the match at WrestleMania 36 in a Last Man Standing Match, when Edge won. Then at Backlash in a Singles Match, which Orton win and result Edge out of action due tore his triceps. At the 2021 Royal Rumble, Edge return and won the men's Royal Rumble match by last eliminating Randy Orton. Orton challenged Edge to a rubber match on the following night's Raw, where Edge defeated Orton to end to their rivalry.

Following their loss at WrestleMania (not to mention failing to regain the Divas Championship), tension rose in LayCool. After two weeks of couples therapy, a bitter Michelle McCool turned on Layla, dissolving their team. Layla and McCool would face off in a match at the Extreme Rules pay-per-view with no count-outs, no disqualifications, and the loser has to leave WWE. Layla went on to win the match, resulting in McCool's subsequent – and legit – departure from WWE.

=== Future ===
WrestleMania XXVII was the last WWE pay-per-view to be promoted under the promotion's full name of World Wrestling Entertainment, as just after the event on April 7, the company began to refer to itself solely as "WWE", with the abbreviation becoming an orphaned initialism. It was also the last WrestleMania held under the first brand split, which ended in August, although the brand split was reintroduced in July 2016.

== Results ==
No.	Results	Stipulations	Times
1^{D}	Sheamus (c) vs. Daniel Bryan ended in a no contest	Lumberjack match for the WWE United States Championship	4:19
2^{D}	The Great Khali won by last eliminating Sheamus (Note: The other participants in elimination order: Tyler Reks, Curt Hawkins, Yoshi Tatsu, R-Truth, Jey Uso, Jimmy Uso, Mark Henry, Primo, Zack Ryder, Chavo Guerrero, David Hart Smith, JTG, Trent Barreta, Tyson Kidd, Johnny Curtis, Chris Masters, Evan Bourne, William Regal, Ted DiBiase, Drew McIntyre, and Daniel Bryan.)	23-man Battle Royal	8:29
3	Edge (c) (with Christian) defeated Alberto Del Rio (with Brodus Clay and Ricardo Rodriguez) by pinfall	Singles match for the World Heavyweight Championship	11:06
4	Cody Rhodes defeated Rey Mysterio by pinfall	Singles match	11:58
5	Big Show, Kane, Kofi Kingston, and Santino Marella defeated The Corre (Ezekiel Jackson, Heath Slater, Justin Gabriel, and Wade Barrett) by pinfall	Eight-man tag team match	1:32
6	Randy Orton defeated CM Punk by pinfall	Singles match The New Nexus were banned from ringside.	14:45
7	Michael Cole defeated Jerry Lawler by disqualification (Note: Lawler originally won the match by submission, but the Anonymous Raw General Manager reversed the decision and awarded the win to Cole by disqualification due to the interference of Austin.)	Singles match "Stone Cold" Steve Austin served as the special guest referee.	13:48
8	The Undertaker defeated Triple H by submission	No Holds Barred match	29:25
9	John Morrison, Nicole "Snooki" Polizzi, and Trish Stratus defeated Dolph Ziggler and LayCool (Layla and Michelle McCool) (with Vickie Guerrero) by pinfall	Six-person Mixed tag team match	3:16
10	The Miz (c) (with Alex Riley) defeated John Cena by pinfall (Note: This match originally ended in a double countout, but was restarted by The Rock under "no disqualifications, no count-outs, no time limits" rules.)	Singles match for the WWE Championship	15:21
(c) / – the champion(s) heading into the match; D / – this was a dark match
