= Michael Cole (wrestling) =

American professional wrestling commentator (born 1966)

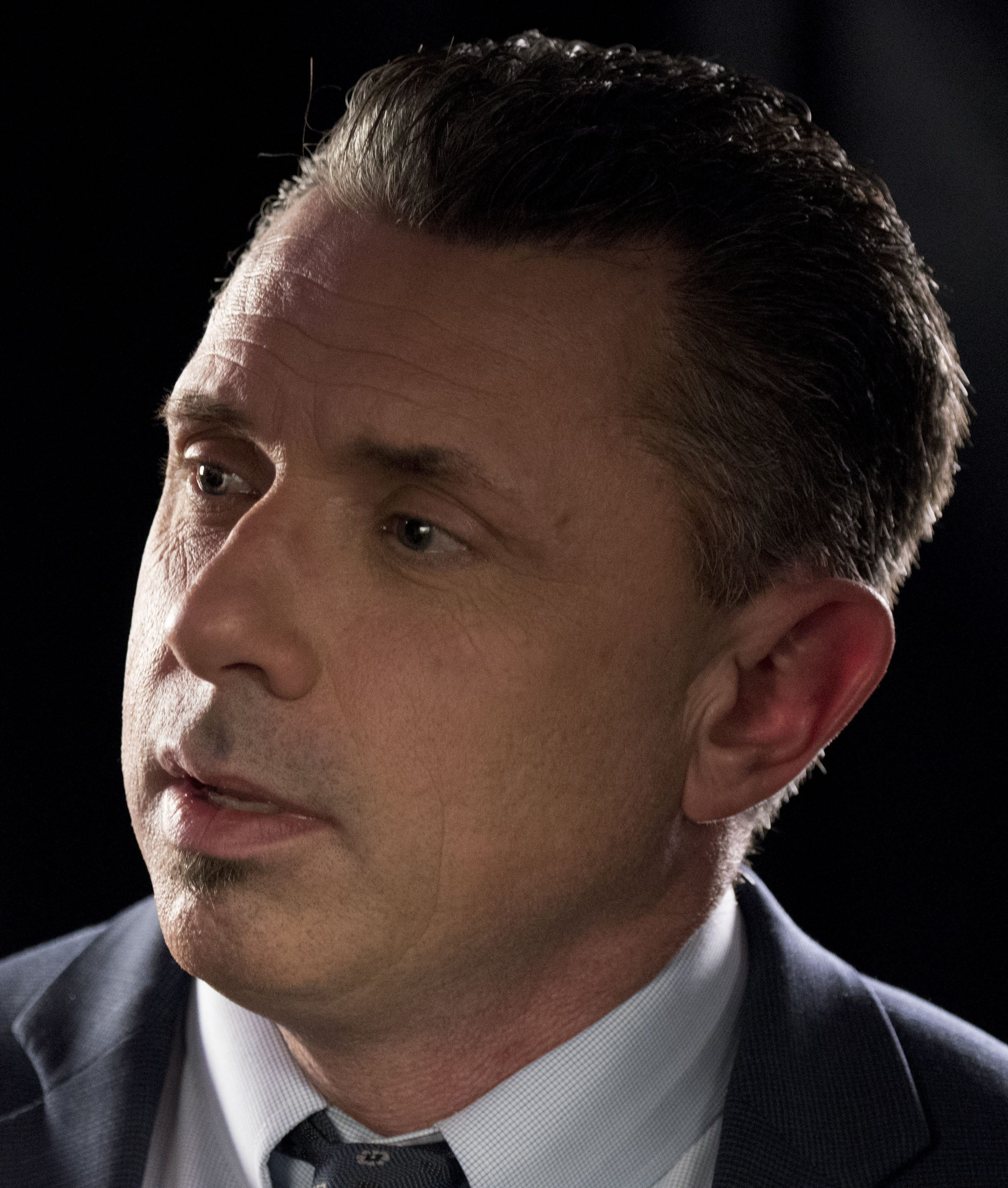
- Cole in 2016
- Born: Sean Michael Coulthard; December 8, 1966 (age 59); Syracuse, New York, U.S.
- Education: Syracuse University
- Occupation: Journalist
- Years active: 1988–present
- Employer(s): CBS Radio (1988–1997); Titan Sports/WWE (1997–present); TKO Group Holdings (2023–present)
- Spouse: Yolanda Coulthard (m. 1987)
- Children: 2
- Professional wrestling career
- Ring name: Michael Cole
- Billed height: 5 ft 9 in (1.75 m)
- Billed weight: 176 lb (80 kg)
- Billed from: Amenia, New York
- Debut: 1997

Sean Michael Coulthard (born December 8, 1966), better known by his on screen name Michael Cole, is an American professional wrestling commentator and journalist. Since 1997, he has been signed to WWE, where he serves as the play-by-play commentator for the SmackDown brand, and was the vice president of announcing between 2020 and 2024.

Coulthard began his career in journalism in 1988 for CBS Radio before being hired by the then-World Wrestling Federation (WWF) in 1997 (WWF was renamed WWE in 2002). He has performed multiple on-screen hosting and commentary roles across his two-decade-plus-long career.

== Early life and education ==
Sean Michael Coulthard was born on December 8, 1966, in Syracuse, New York. He attended the S.I. Newhouse School of Public Communications at Syracuse University, graduating in 1988 with a B.A. in broadcast journalism.

== Journalism career ==
Coulthard began his career in the media as a journalist, working for CBS Radio. His first high-profile assignment was to cover the 1988 US presidential campaign of Democratic Party nominee Michael Dukakis. In 1992, he reported on the presidential campaign of Bill Clinton. He also covered the 51-day siege at the Branch Davidian compound in Waco, Texas, in 1993, and the following year, spent nine months covering the Yugoslavian civil war. In 1995, he was also selected to cover the aftermath of the Oklahoma City bombing. He returned to the presidential campaign trail in 1996 to cover the campaigns of Republicans Steve Forbes (who lost in the primary election) and Sen. Bob Dole (who lost in the general election).

== Professional wrestling career ==
=== World Wrestling Federation/Entertainment/WWE (1997–present) ===
==== Backstage interviewer and Raw (1997–1999) ====
Coulthard came to the World Wrestling Federation in mid early-1997 after being recommended to company officials by Todd Pettengill, and started using the stage name "Michael Cole". He provided voice-overs for promotional videos and later became the host of the LiveWire show. Cole first appeared on screen at the June 30, 1997 episode of Raw is War, interviewing The Legion of Doom and replaced Todd Pettengill as a backstage interviewer after SummerSlam. In late 1997, Cole became one of the three announcers for the first hour of Monday Night Raw, alongside Jim Ross and Kevin Kelly. Eventually, Cole was permanently replaced by Jerry Lawler in mid-1998. In December 1998, Cole became the regular play-by-play announcer for Raw is War, subbing for Jim Ross when Ross was ill with Bell's palsy. He continued in this role until WrestleMania XV in March 1999.

==== SmackDown! (1999–2008) ====
When the WWF's new SmackDown! television program debuted later that year, Cole was chosen to be the show's play-by-play announcer. Lawler was his original broadcast partner, but when Lawler briefly left the WWF in 2001, he was replaced by Cole's WWF Sunday Night Heat broadcast partner Tazz shortly before the WWF vs. WCW/ECW invasion storyline. After the WWE Brand Extension, Cole worked exclusively for the SmackDown! brand, cutting down to doing play-by-play on SmackDown!-only pay-per-views, while Raw-only pay-per-views were announced by Raw's announce team.

Cole was rarely involved in storylines; however, he has had minor roles in storylines involving Heidenreich, Stephanie McMahon, Vito, and D-Generation X (Triple H, Shawn Michaels, Chyna, and Rick Rude). His 2004 angle with Heidenreich was infamous due to an implied scene where Heidenreich "Heidenraped" him in the arena restroom; in a 2008 interview, Heidenreich explained that the Cole rape angle was McMahon's idea and that Pulp Fiction came to mind when Stephanie McMahon approached him with the idea. He called play-by-play at the 2006 Royal Rumble match because Jim Ross, who had commentated the last two Royal Rumble matches with Tazz, had been (kayfabe) "fired" and replaced by former ECW play-by-play man Joey Styles, reuniting the original SmackDown! team of Cole and Jerry Lawler. On February 3, 2006, it was announced that Cole and Tazz were starting a radio show on Howard Stern's Howard 100 on Sirius Satellite Radio, but the show was a trial run that only lasted a couple of weeks.

On the June 9 episode of SmackDown!, Cole's broadcast partner Tazz left SmackDown! to ECW, leaving Cole at that moment without a broadcast partner. Two days later at ECW One Night Stand, John "Bradshaw" Layfield (JBL) announced he would replace Tazz as color commentator. After JBL left the broadcast booth and returned to wrestling on Raw, Jonathan Coachman became Cole's new partner on the January 4, 2008 episode of SmackDown!. Coachman was then replaced by Mick Foley, beginning at Backlash.

==== Return to Raw (2008–2009) ====
As part of the 2008 WWE Draft, Cole was drafted to the Raw brand as Jim Ross was drafted to the SmackDown brand, ending Cole's nearly 10-year run as a play-by-play commentator on SmackDown. On the July 7 episode of Raw, Cole was attacked by Kane, who repeatedly asked Cole "Is he alive or dead?" before Cole was saved by Jerry Lawler. Cole made his in-ring debut on the July 28 episode of Raw, teaming with Lawler against Cody Rhodes and Ted DiBiase for the World Tag Team Championship, but they lost after Cole inadvertently tagged himself in and was quickly pinned by Rhodes after a lariat.

==== Heel turn and feud with Jerry Lawler (2010–2012) ====
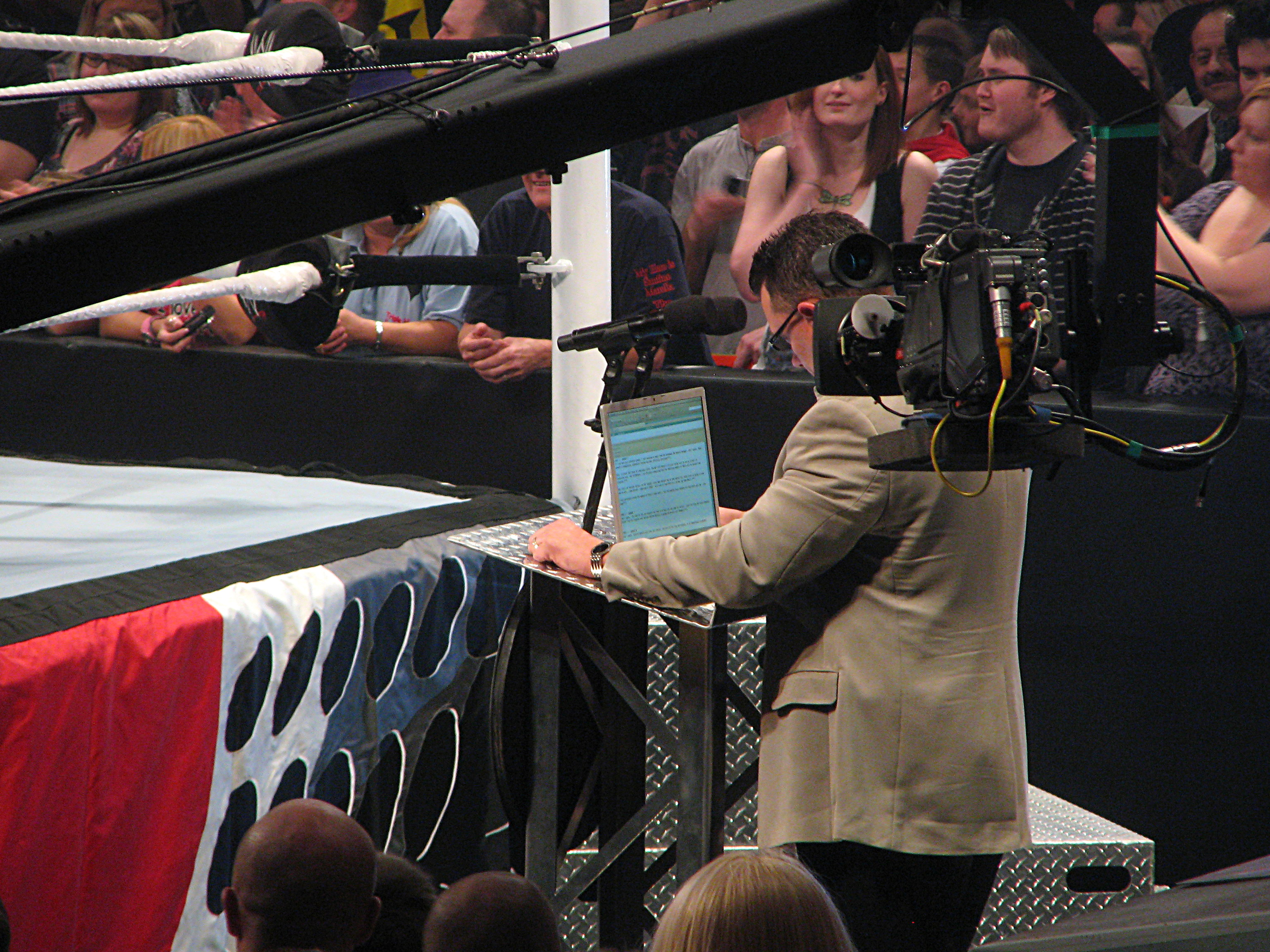
Cole reading an email from the Anonymous General Manager.

Cole was the lead commentator for WWE NXT for its first three seasons, and during the first season in 2010, Cole began showing signs of arrogance and cockiness towards face wrestlers and WWE fans alike, turning heel for the first time in his WWE career. He also began to belittle Daniel Bryan and took a liking to The Miz, leading to confrontations with Bryan throughout the season. Meanwhile, on the Raw brand, Cole was made the official spokesman for the Anonymous Raw General Manager on June 21. On October 1, Cole returned to SmackDown to join Matt Striker and Todd Grisham on commentary, and branded himself the "Voice of the WWE", stating that he should be on all WWE shows going forward.

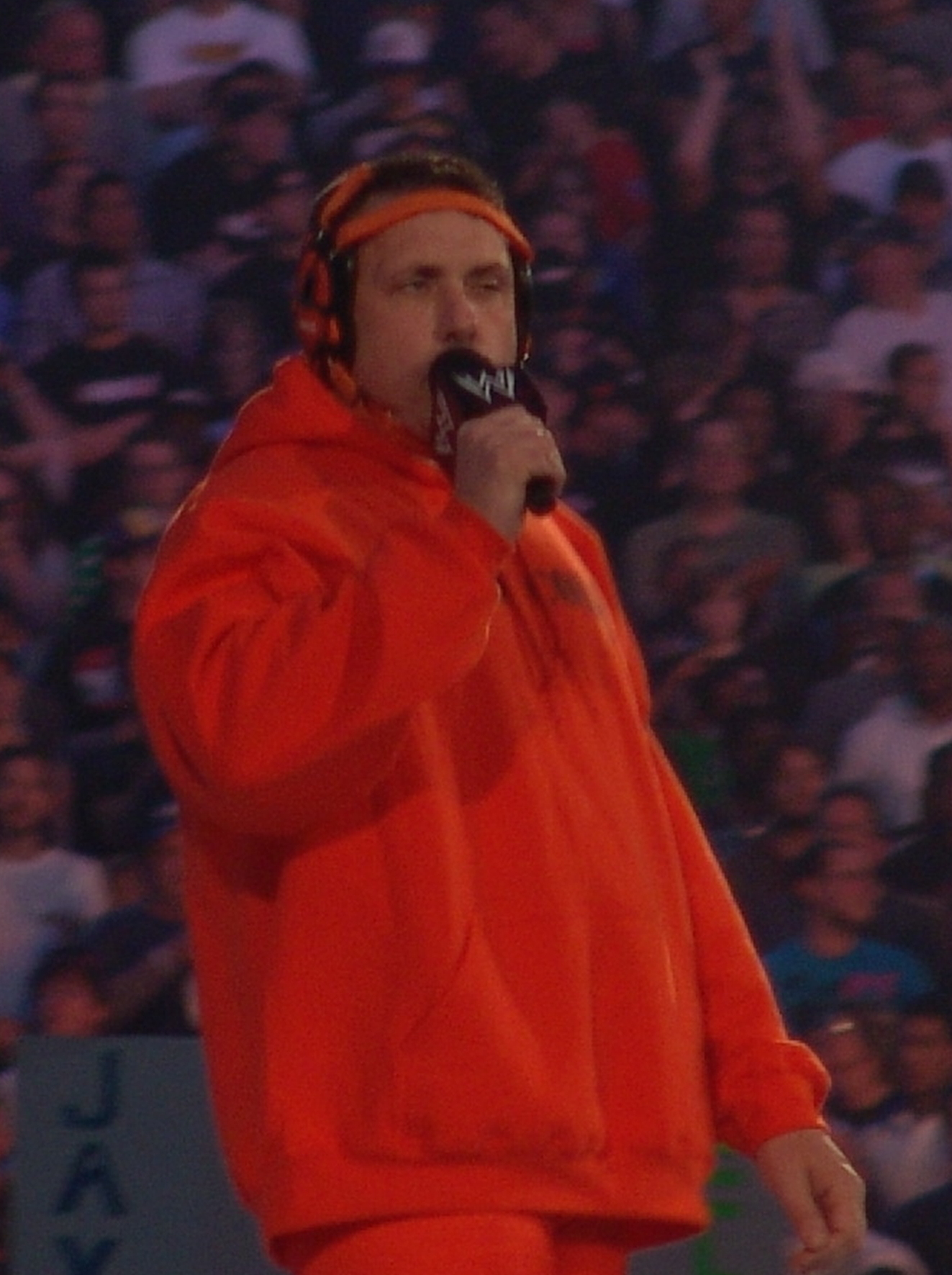
Cole at WrestleMania XXVII

On the November 29, 2010 episode of Raw, Cole interfered in a Tables, Ladders, and Chairs match for the WWE Championship between Jerry Lawler and The Miz, costing Lawler the match and helping The Miz retain his title. This began a feud with Lawler that built towards a match at WrestleMania XXVII. During this time, Cole revealed Jack Swagger as his trainer and antagonized Lawler with antics such as making light of his mother's death and inviting his son Brian Lawler to air family secrets. At WrestleMania on April 3, special referee Stone Cold Steve Austin announced Lawler won the match, but the Anonymous Raw General Manager reversed the decision and declared Cole the winner by disqualification, due to Austin being involved in the match. On May 1, at Extreme Rules, Cole teamed with Swagger to defeat Jim Ross and Lawler in a Country Whipping match. Lawler and Cole had a final "Kiss My Foot" match at Over the Limit on May 22, which Cole lost; after the match, Bret Hart returned and put Cole in his signature submission move, the Sharpshooter, to help Lawler make Cole kiss his foot. Cole apologized to Lawler the following night on Raw, ending their feud.

Cole continued to wrestle sporadically after this and still favored most heels while questioning the actions of the faces to regain control in matches. On the July 25 episode of Raw, Triple H placed Cole in a match against Zack Ryder, which Cole lost quickly. Cole and Alberto Del Rio lost a tag team match to John Cena and Jim Ross on the October 17 episode of Raw SuperShow, prompting Cole to challenge Ross to the "Michael Cole Challenge" (a series of three contests); Cole said that if Ross won each challenge, Cole would quit his job. During the challenge on the November 14 episode of Raw SuperShow, Ross won the first two challenges (arm wrestling and dancing), causing Cole to declare that the third contest was who weighed less, which Cole won. Ross was subsequently fired and CM Punk came out and attacked Cole; Cole vowed revenge and said he would sue Punk for injuring him. On January 29, Cole was a surprise entrant in the 2012 Royal Rumble match, but was quickly eliminated by Lawler, Booker T, and the returning Kharma. Cole was put in a match with John Cena on the June 4, 2012, episode of Raw SuperShow, but lost and was forced to make an apology for all of his wrongdoings.

On the July 9 episode of Raw SuperShow, Cole was booked against Jerry Lawler in a WrestleMania XXVII rematch, which he quickly lost. The Anonymous Raw General Manager reversed the decision, making Cole the winner by disqualification following interference by Booker T, but then Santino Marella came out and pulled out Hornswoggle from hiding underneath the ring, claiming that he was the Anonymous Raw General Manager.

==== Face turn (2012–present) ====
Cole was lauded for his handling of his fellow commentary partner Jerry Lawler's legitimate on-air heart attack on the September 10, 2012 episode of Raw. Despite being a heel commentator for two years, Cole provided updates to television viewers on Lawler's condition throughout the episode. He was praised for his handling of the emergency, turning face as he began favoring the face wrestlers and began receiving cheers. Cole also joined in commentary during Raw and pay-per-view events, including Night of Champions and Hell in a Cell by Jim Ross and John "Bradshaw" Layfield (JBL). On the November 12 episode of Raw, Cole cemented his face turn when he hugged the returning Lawler in the ring.

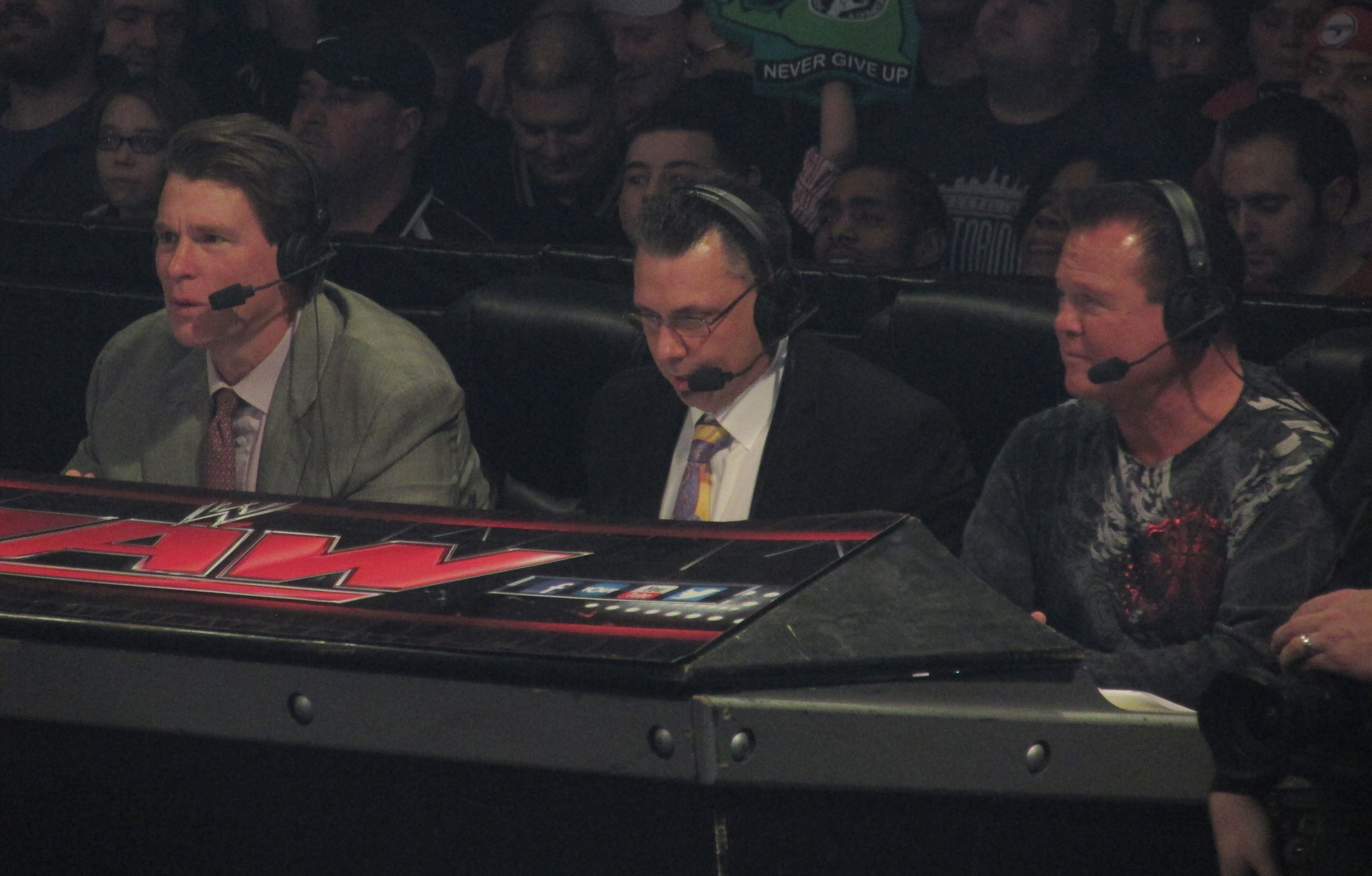
Cole (center) commentating on Raw with John "Bradshaw" Layfield (left) and Jerry Lawler (right) in January 2014.

On the March 30, 2015, episode of Raw, Cole, along with JBL and Booker T, was attacked by Brock Lesnar after Seth Rollins refused Lesnar his WWE World Heavyweight Championship rematch. Cole did not appear on commentary the following week as part of a storyline injury. On June 8, Cole welcomed Byron Saxton as the color commentator for Raw, replacing Booker T. On the January 15, 2018 episode of Raw, Cole was attacked by Braun Strowman due to Strowman's anger at being fired by General Manager Kurt Angle and was subsequently replaced by Tom Phillips for the remainder of the broadcast.

On September 26, 2019, WWE announced as a part of their "WWE Premiere Week" that a new commentary team would be on SmackDown. Cole returned to SmackDown as a full-time commentator for the first time in six years, appearing alongside former Raw commentators Corey Graves and Renee Young. He was joined on commentary with Pat McAfee on April 16, 2021. McAfee eventually took a break to work for ESPN's College Gameday, and Cole would be joined by Wade Barrett on commentary for SmackDown and for premium live events with Graves.

On August 5, 2023, WWE went with more on-air commentary changes as Cole returned to Raw on August 7, with Wade Barrett joining him on commentary. He remained on SmackDown as Corey Graves would be returning on commentary with Kevin Patrick joining in. On January 1, 2024, Cole left SmackDown again, leaving Patrick and Graves as the two-man commentary team and was rejoined by Pat McAfee on Raw later that month.

When SmackDown returned to USA Network on September 13, 2024, Cole was replaced by the debuting Joe Tessitore on Raw on September 2, while McAfee was on hiatus due to his involvement on ESPN College Gameday. However, Cole and McAfee returned to Raw upon its series premiere on Netflix, which acquired the rights to Raw in January 2024, starting January 6, 2025.

From 2020 onwards, Cole has engaged in longstanding feuds on commentary against Bayley, with whom he has had issues in storyline over the past few years, Top Dolla, whom Cole called out for a botched top rope spot on an episode of SmackDown, and Dominik Mysterio, whom Cole sides against in Dominik's feud with his father Rey Mysterio.

On the WWE Raw on Netflix Anniversary Show on January 5, 2026, Cole and Graves returned to Raw. Nine months later, he returned with Graves on SmackDown.

=== Reality of Wrestling (2013) ===
In December 2013, Cole served as a special guest announcer for fellow WWE employee Booker T's professional wrestling promotion Reality of Wrestling, along with Rich Brennan (formerly known as Anthony Pratt and Rich Bocchini).

== Legacy ==
Legendary professional wrestling commentator, WWE Hall of Famer and former broadcast partner colleague Jim Ross has praised Cole: "Michael works his ass off. He's a good family man, he's a company man, he works diligently to do his job. I respect him for all those things. I've always liked him, he's a good dude, and folks won't understand that. They only judge him for his television persona, rightly or wrongly. It's kind of frustrating". PWInsider's Dave Scherer called Cole "The GOAT (Greatest of All Time)", praising his work under Vince McMahon's pressure. Nigel McGuinness also praised Cole, pointing how many things he learned from him.

== Other media ==
Cole has appeared as a commentator in numerous WWE video games, providing his voice. He has also appeared as a non-playable character in several and is a playable character in WWF SmackDown! 2: Know Your Role, WWF No Mercy as an unlockable character and WWE '12 as a downloadable character.

Cole has also appeared in Activision's Call of Duty Modern Warfare III and Call of Duty Warzone as Himself. He announced finish moves for the featured wrestler operator skins of Rhea Ripley, Rey Mysterio and Cody Rhodes, as well as other various voice lines in the game, including a variation of Team Deathmatch called "Slam Deathmatch".

Cole appeared on the September 12, 2012, episode of Fox & Friends to address fellow WWE commentator Jerry Lawler's heart attack that occurred during the September 10 live broadcast of Raw.

== Filmography ==
=== Film ===
Year	Title	Role	Notes
2014	Scooby-Doo! WrestleMania Mystery	Himself	Voice performance; direct-to-video
2016	Scooby-Doo! and WWE: Curse of the Speed Demon	Himself	Voice performance; direct-to-video
2017	Surf's Up 2: WaveMania	Seagull, himself	Voice performance; direct-to-video
2017	The Jetsons & WWE: Robo-WrestleMania!	Himself	Voice performance; direct-to-video

=== Web series ===
Year	Title	Role	Notes
2012–2015	The JBL & Cole Show	Himself	Series regular (2012–2014), recurring (2014–2015)
2013–2016	Michael Cole's Weekly Sit-Down Interviews	Himself	Host

=== WWE Network ===
Year	Title	Role	Notes
2016	WWE 24: Thank You Daniel	Himself	Guest
2016	WWE 24: WrestleMania Monday	Himself	Guest

== Awards and accomplishments ==
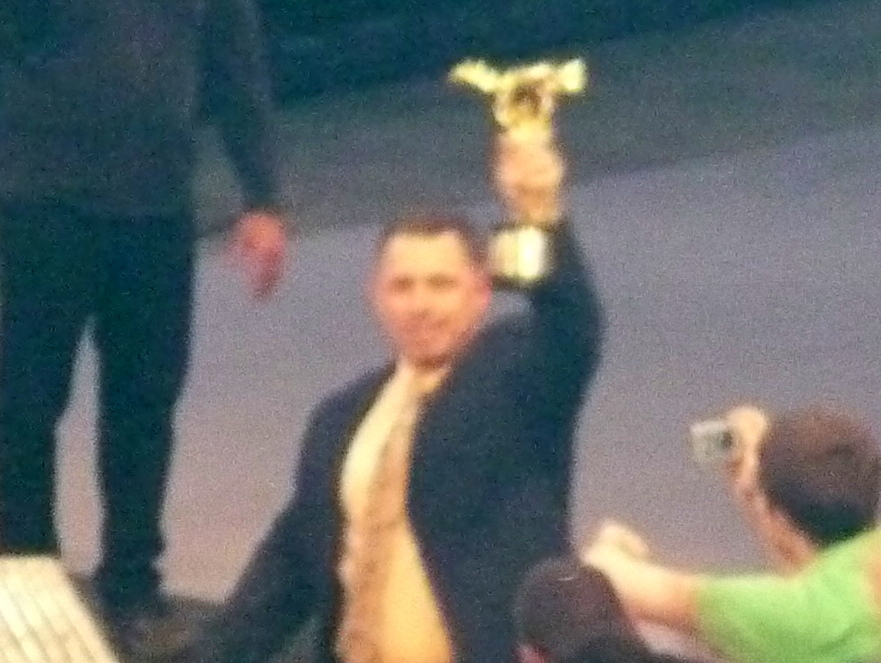
Cole is a four-time Slammy Award winner.

- The Baltimore Sun
  - Non-Wrestling Performer of the Year (2010)
- World Wrestling Entertainment / WWE
  - Slammy Award (4 times)
    - "Oh My" Moment of the Year (2009) vomiting on Chris Jericho – SmackDown's 10th anniversary
    - "And I Quote..." Line of the Year (2010)
    - Most Regrettable Attire of the Year (2011) Dressing as Triple H
    - Favorite Web Show of the Year (2013) – with John "Bradshaw" Layfield and Renee Young for The JBL & Cole Show
- Wrestling Observer Newsletter
  - Worst Gimmick (2011)
  - Worst Television Announcer (2001, 2009–2012, 2020)
- WrestleCrap
  - Gooker Award (2011) Antics throughout the years

Preceded by Jim Ross	Raw Lead Announcer; 1998–1999	Succeeded by Jim Ross
Preceded by Inaugural	SmackDown Lead Announcer; 1999–2008	Succeeded by Jim Ross
Preceded by Todd Grisham	SmackDown Lead Announcer; 2010–2012	Succeeded by Josh Mathews
Preceded by Josh Mathews	SmackDown Lead Announcer; 2013–2014	Succeeded by Tom Phillips
Preceded by Jim Ross	Raw Lead Announcer; 2008–2019	Succeeded by Vic Joseph
Preceded by Tom Phillips	SmackDown Lead Announcer; 2015	Succeeded by Tom Phillips
Preceded by Tom Phillips	SmackDown Lead Announcer; 2019–2023	Succeeded by Kevin Patrick
Preceded by Kevin Patrick	Raw Lead Announcer; 2023–2024	Succeeded by Joe Tessitore
Preceded by Corey Graves	SmackDown Lead Announcer; 2024–2025	Succeeded by Joe Tessitore
Preceded by Joe Tessitore	Raw Lead Announcer; 2025–present	Succeeded by current
