= Anonymous Raw General Manager =

Professional wrestling authority figure in WWE

The Anonymous Raw General Manager was a professional wrestling authority figure in WWE, who anonymously controlled the Raw brand from June 21, 2010 to July 18, 2011. The Anonymous General Manager controlled the show by sending emails to a laptop, the emails were usually read on-screen by its spokesperson, Michael Cole. Hornswoggle was revealed to be the Anonymous Raw General Manager after the character returned for one night on July 9, 2012. In November 2014, the Anonymous General Manager made a brief return to television, but was, for a second time, removed from power.

== First run ==
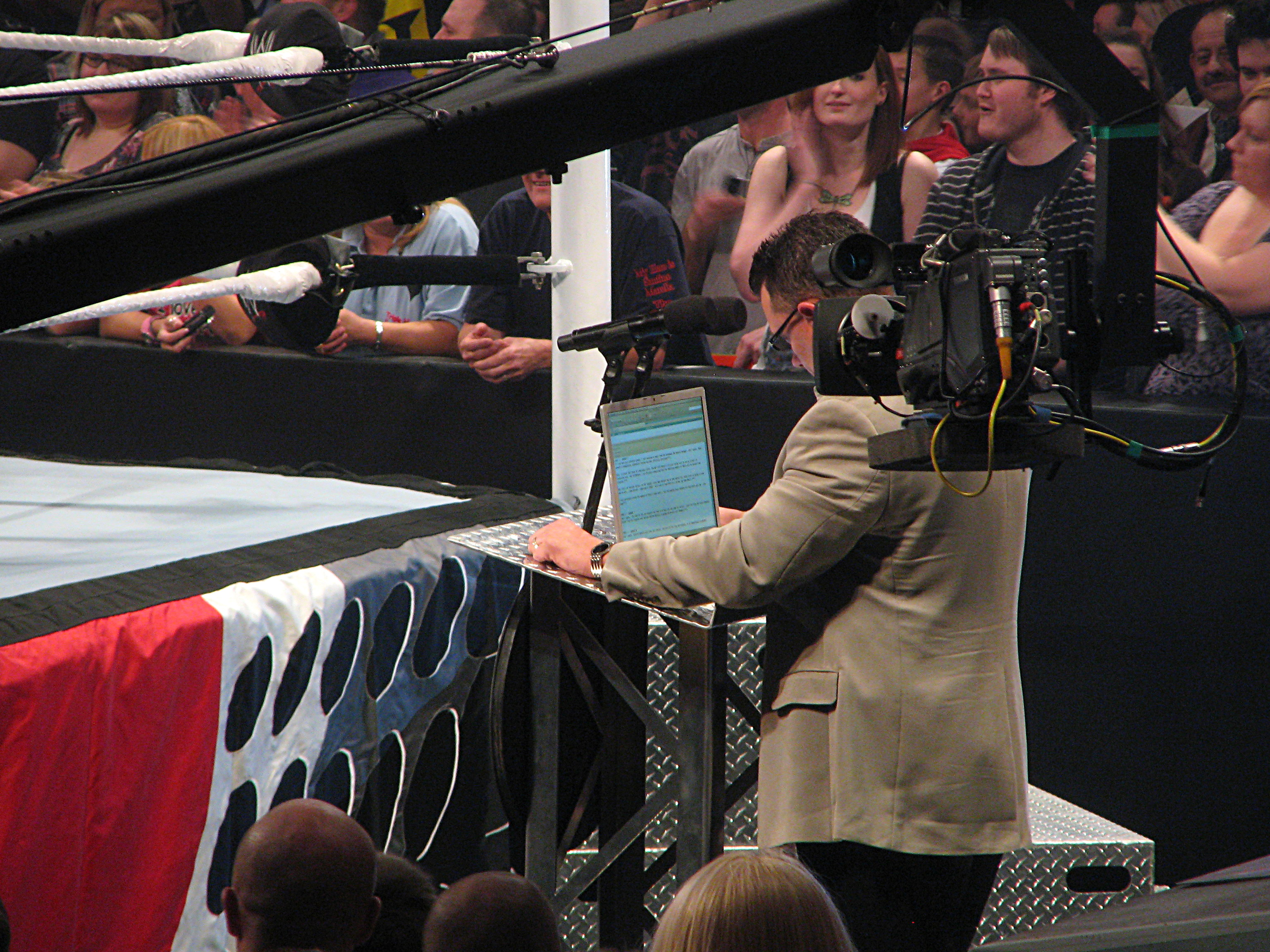
Michael Cole reads an email from the Anonymous General Manager.

Mr. McMahon first unveiled the Anonymous Raw General Manager on the June 21, 2010 episode of Raw, after firing the previous general manager, Bret Hart. While Michael Cole often acted as the spokesperson, the Anonymous Raw General Manager once used a computerized voice when it was interviewed by Edge on The Cutting Edge. The interview ended with Edge destroying the General Manager's laptop. Occasionally the Anonymous General Manager left hints at its true identity, such as dropping catchphrases from popular superstars, however these were red herrings. The Anonymous General Manager controlled Raw until July 2011, when it was phased out in favor of COO Triple H and Vice President of Talent Relations John Laurinaitis without its identity ever being revealed.

As buildup towards Raw 1000, previous Raw general managers returned for one night only to control the show. The Anonymous Raw General Manager returned on July 9, 2012. There, it was revealed that Hornswoggle had been the Anonymous General Manager throughout its first run. According to former WWE writer Kevin Eck, WWE had no plans regarding an identity for the Anonymous Raw General Manager before it was initially fizzled out. Hornswoggle was suggested by a writer during a creative team meeting as a joke which played off the poor reception to an earlier storyline where Hornswoggle had been revealed to be Mr. McMahon's illegitimate child. Hornswoggle has stated that the original plan for his general manager character was "[a] mob-boss style character with this Napoleon complex, throwing his power around", but these plans never came to fruition.

== 2014 return ==
At Survivor Series, The Authority, who had previously held power in WWE, were deposed. The following night, Raw closed with the Anonymous General Manager's familiar e-mail noise, followed by Michael Cole's reading of an e-mail in which the Anonymous General Manager promised to bring "order" back to WWE. The identity of this general manager remains unknown; an article on WWE.com questioned its gender and the possibility of it being Hornswoggle again. Heading into 2015, the laptop disappeared again with The Authority taking over once more.
