= WrestleMania XXVI =

2010 World Wrestling Entertainment pay-per-view event

- Promotional poster featuring Shawn Michaels, Triple H, John Cena, The Undertaker, and Batista
- Promotion: World Wrestling Entertainment
- Brand(s): Raw; SmackDown
- Date: March 28, 2010
- City: Glendale, Arizona
- Venue: University of Phoenix Stadium
- Attendance: 72,219
- Buy rate: 885,000
- Tagline: Get All Fired Up

Pay-per-view chronology
← Previous; Elimination Chamber	Next → Extreme Rules

WrestleMania chronology
← Previous; 25	Next → XXVII

WrestleMania XXVI was a 2010 professional wrestling pay-per-view (PPV) event produced by World Wrestling Entertainment (WWE). It was the 26th annual WrestleMania and took place on March 28, 2010, at the University of Phoenix Stadium in the Phoenix suburb of Glendale, Arizona, held for wrestlers from the promotion's Raw and SmackDown brand divisions. This was the first WrestleMania since WrestleMania XI in 1995 with a non-title match as a main event, the first WrestleMania held in the U.S. state of Arizona, and the fifth held in an open-air or retractable roof venue, after WrestleMania VI in 1990, WrestleMania IX in 1993, WrestleMania X8 in 2002, and WrestleMania XXIV in 2008.

The card consisted of eight matches, including three main matches. The final match on the card was a no disqualification, no countout match where The Undertaker defeated Shawn Michaels to improve his undefeated WrestleMania streak to 18–0; per the pre-match stipulation, Michaels was forced to retire (though he would wrestle one more match at Crown Jewel 2018). In the main match from the SmackDown brand, World Heavyweight Champion Chris Jericho defeated the 2010 Royal Rumble winner Edge to retain the title. In Raw's main match, John Cena defeated Batista to win the WWE Championship. The undercard also included a No Holds Barred match where Bret Hart defeated Mr. McMahon and the sixth annual Money in the Bank ladder match where Jack Swagger defeated Christian, Dolph Ziggler, Drew McIntyre, Evan Bourne, Kane, Kofi Kingston, Matt Hardy, Montel Vontavious Porter, and Shelton Benjamin—this was the last Money in the Bank ladder match contested at a WrestleMania before the advent of the annual Money in the Bank PPV event in July.

Tickets for the event commenced sale to the public on November 7, 2009. WrestleMania XXVI generated approximately 885,000 PPV buys, grossing US$49 million in revenue. With an attendance of 72,219, the event grossed $5.8 million in ticket sales, making the event the highest-grossing and attended entertainment event held at the University of Phoenix Stadium.

== Production ==
=== Background ===
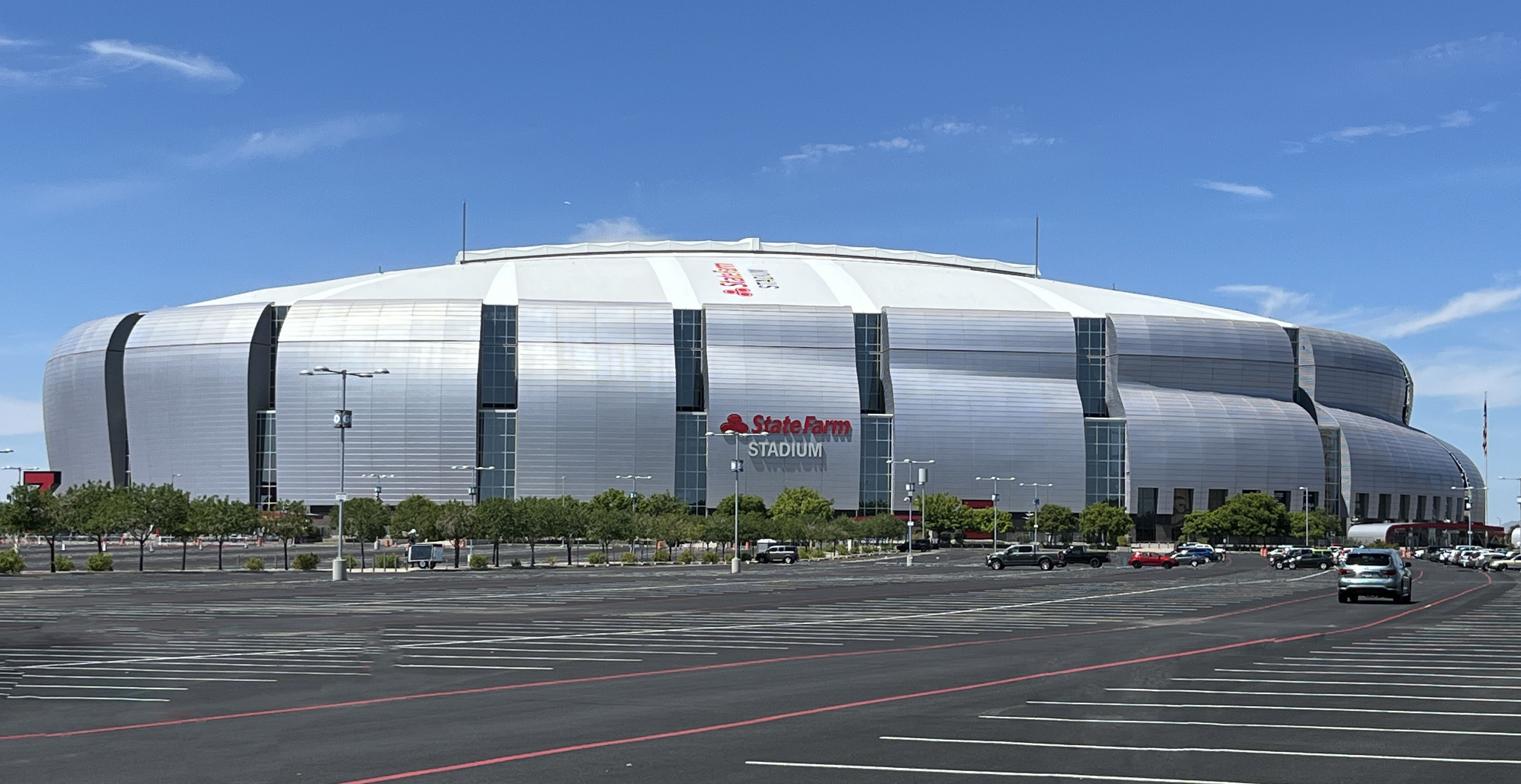
The 26th annual WrestleMania was held at the University of Phoenix Stadium in the Phoenix suburb of Glendale, Arizona.

WrestleMania is considered World Wrestling Entertainment's (WWE) flagship professional wrestling pay-per-view (PPV) event, having first been held in 1985. It has become the longest-running professional wrestling event in history and is held annually between mid-March to mid-April. It was the first of WWE's original four pay-per-views, which includes Royal Rumble, SummerSlam, and Survivor Series, referred to as the "Big Four".

Global Spectrum, the University of Phoenix Stadium's operator, had worked in previous years with WWE to recruit the event to its venue in the Phoenix suburb of Glendale, Arizona. On January 18, 2008, Global Spectrum publicly announced its intention to host WrestleMania in 2010. The event gained media attention in the weeks prior when a photo of Wayne Gretzky, then head coach of the Phoenix Coyotes, wearing a shirt promoting the event surfaced in the Swedish newspaper Expressen. At a press conference on February 24, 2009, at the University of Phoenix Stadium, WrestleMania XXVI was formally announced to be held at the venue on March 28, 2010, featuring wrestlers from the Raw and SmackDown brand divisions. This marked the first time for a WrestleMania to take place in the U.S. state of Arizona. Tickets for the event went on sale November 7, 2009, at 10:00am MST.

The roof of the University of Phoenix Stadium was opened several times during the event, marking the third time in WrestleMania history after WrestleMania IX in 1993 and WrestleMania XXIV in 2008 that the event had been held in an open-air venue. As in the previous open-air events, a steel tarpaulin structure was placed over the ring, which was placed at the 50-yard line. Custom-built from Belgium, the tarpaulin held 30 tons of light and camera equipment, with much of the equipment shipped from the 2010 Winter Olympics in Vancouver, British Columbia, Canada. Over 1,000 lights were used, adapting to the decrease in sunlight as the show continued into the night. The entrance stage stood 8 feet (2.4 m) off the stadium floor and measured 120 feet (37 m) wide. In an interview with The Arizona Republic, production manager Brian Petree described the stage design as a "completely new design that hasn't been done anywhere and won't be done again", while production designer Jason Robinson discussed basing his stage design themes often on local flavors, or in simple terms, the stage design of WrestleMania XXVI simply resembled that of a ziggurat. The entrance ramp linking to the stage was lined with cauldrons of fire, each at a temperature of 1,000 °F (538 °C). In addition, 400,000 individual pieces of pyrotechnic product were launched 200 feet (61 m) into the open air after Robinson promised to introduce new types of pyrotechnics never used in a WWE show before. Pre-planning for the set-up began six months before the event, while the construction structures and equipment inside the stadium began two weeks before the event. An estimated 100 trucks were used to deliver equipment, in comparison to the 12 semi-trucks used for a regular WWE show.

The official theme songs for the event were "I Made It" by Kevin Rudolf, "Be Yourself" by Audioslave, "Thunderstruck" by AC/DC, and "The Show" by Since October. "Ain't No Grave (Gonna Hold My Body Down)" by Johnny Cash was also used to promote the Undertaker–Michaels match. Fantasia Barrino performed the annual rendition of "America the Beautiful" at the start of the show. The commentators were Michael Cole, Jerry Lawler, and Matt Striker.

=== Marketing ===
Along with WrestleMania XXVI, a series of events grouped as "WrestleMania Week" were held in the week preceding the event. To begin promotion for the event in Glendale, a "Kick-off Party" was held at the Westgate City Center on March 19, which included appearances from WWE wrestlers, autograph signings and live entertainment, along with a giant LED screen viewing of that night's episode of SmackDown. The third annual WrestleMania Art (formerly WrestleManiArt), an art exhibition and auction featuring work by WWE superstars, was held on March 24 at the Make-A-Wish Foundation National Headquarters. WrestleMania's annual fan convention, WrestleMania Axxess, was held from March 25 through March 28 at the Phoenix Convention Center. On March 27, WWE hosted its annual WWE Hall of Fame ceremony at the Dodge Theater, where the Class of 2010 was inducted.

=== Storylines ===
The professional wrestling matches at WrestleMania XXVI featured professional wrestlers performing as characters in scripted events pre-determined by the hosting promotion, WWE. Storylines between the characters were produced on WWE's weekly television shows, Raw and SmackDown with the Raw and SmackDown brands—storyline divisions in which WWE assigned its employees to different programs.

At The Bash in 2009, Edge and Chris Jericho established a tag team partnership when they won the Unified WWE Tag Team Championship that night. Their partnership was short lived as Edge suffered a torn achilles tendon and had to vacate his half of the championship. Jericho distanced himself from Edge, crediting himself for all of the team's success. Edge made his return from injury at the Royal Rumble during the namesake match. Edge would eliminate Jericho en route to winning the Royal Rumble match, earning himself an opportunity to fight for either the WWE Championship or the World Heavyweight Championship at WrestleMania. In the main event of the Elimination Chamber event three weeks later, Jericho won the World Heavyweight Championship in an Elimination Chamber match. The following night on Raw, Edge challenged Jericho for the World Heavyweight Championship at WrestleMania after spearing him.

One of the predominant rivalries heading into WrestleMania XXVI was between John Cena and Batista for the WWE Championship. The conflict started when Cena sided with Bret Hart over Hart's hostility with WWE Chairman Mr. McMahon. When Hart and McMahon confronted each other on the February 1 episode of Raw, Batista saved McMahon from an attack and ambushed Hart from behind. After the show ended, Cena tried to help Hart but was too attacked by Batista. In the opening match of the Elimination Chamber event, Cena won the WWE Championship from Sheamus in an Elimination Chamber match but was shortly interrupted by McMahon, who ordered a title match between Cena and Batista to take place on the spot. With Cena too tired to compete, Batista defeated him and won the title. On the February 22 episode of Raw, Cena asked for a rematch for the title at WrestleMania, which McMahon gave him the opportunity to as long as he defeated Batista that night. Later that night, Batista intentionally got himself disqualified by kicking Cena in the groin to set up their match at WrestleMania.

At WrestleMania 25, Shawn Michaels was unsuccessful in defeating The Undertaker and ending Undertaker's undefeated streak at the event. When the match won the 2009 Slammy Award for Match of the Year, Michaels stated in his acceptance speech that he could still defeat The Undertaker at WrestleMania and challenged him to a rematch. A month later, The Undertaker, then the World Heavyweight Champion, made his reply and denied a rematch, stating that he had nothing to prove to Michaels. The refusal saw Michaels obsess about facing the Undertaker at the event, attacking referee Charles Robinson and SmackDown general manager Theodore Long respectively after failing his title match opportunities in the Royal Rumble match and Elimination Chamber qualifiers. At the Elimination Chamber event, Michaels snuck into Undertaker's Elimination Chamber match for the World Heavyweight Championship and performed a Sweet Chin Music on The Undertaker, enabling Chris Jericho to defeat The Undertaker and win the World Heavyweight Championship. On the following night, The Undertaker changed his mind and accepted the rematch but with the stipulation that if Michaels loses, he would have to retire. Michaels accepted, noting that if he could not end the streak, there was no reason why his career should continue. Two weeks later, Michaels and The Undertaker agreed on another additional stipulation; that the match would have no disqualifications and no count-outs.

On the February 22 episode of Raw, the sixth annual Money in the Bank ladder match was set for WrestleMania XXVI. In this match, numerous participants compete to retrieve a briefcase that is suspended above the ring with a cable by climbing a ladder. The briefcase holds a symbolic contract which the holder would be able to exchange for a WWE or World Heavyweight match at any time or location of his choosing up until WrestleMania XXVII. The first qualifying match was held later that night, in which Christian defeated Carlito to qualify. Three more qualifying matches were held on the February 26 episode of SmackDown, which saw Dolph Ziggler defeat John Morrison and R-Truth in a triple threat match, Kane defeat Drew McIntyre, and Shelton Benjamin defeat CM Punk to qualify. The March 1 episode of Raw saw both Jack Swagger and Montel Vontavious Porter qualify by defeating Santino Marella and Zack Ryder respectively. Matt Hardy was the next to qualify for the match when he defeated Drew McIntyre on the March 5 episode of SmackDown. In what was initially declared as the final qualifying match, Evan Bourne defeated William Regal on the March 8 episode of Raw to become the eighth competitor. Due to his favorable association with Vince McMahon, McIntyre was given a third chance on the March 12 episode of SmackDown to qualify for the match, increasing the number of participants to nine. In what would also be made an Intercontinental Championship defense by Theodore Long, McIntyre defeated local competitor Aaron Bolo to qualify. On the March 22 episode of Raw, the number of participants was once again increased to a record ten, when Kofi Kingston defeated Vladimir Kozlov to qualify.

As the guest host of the January 4 episode of Raw, Bret Hart made his return to the show; the first time Hart had appeared since the Montreal Screwjob incident at the 1997 Survivor Series where Vince McMahon was involved in legitimately double-crossing Hart out of the WWF Championship. On Raw, Hart tried to put all hostilities aside and make peace with McMahon, but McMahon again betrayed Hart and kicked him in the groin. The rivalry was further fuelled during Hart's second appearance a month later, where McMahon refused to induct Hart's father, Stu Hart, into the WWE Hall of Fame. On the February 8 episode of Raw, John Cena called out McMahon and told him that Hart wanted to face him at WrestleMania, which McMahon accepted. Hart, who had been banned from the arena, showed up and attacked McMahon. Hiding behind security guards, McMahon changed his mind and canceled the bout. Unable to get his match, Hart addressed the fans a week later and decided to make his goodbye, thanking them. Later on that night, Hart was involved in a car accident when a reversing car smashed the open door from Hart's limousine onto his leg, sending Hart immediately to hospital. McMahon agreed to a "proper farewell" from Hart on the March 1 episode of Raw, but the segment ended up as a challenge from McMahon for a WrestleMania match. Despite initial reluctance from Hart due to his leg, Hart was convinced to accept after McMahon said he had no more heart, called him a coward and kicked his crutches from underneath him. A contract signing was held two weeks later, moderated by guest host "Stone Cold" Steve Austin, who reversed McMahon's decision on Stu Hart's induction into the Hall of Fame. Before the contract was signed, Hart asked for the match to be a No Holds Barred match, which McMahon agreed to. Afterward, Hart revealed that his leg was perfectly fine and that his car accident was a setup created by Cena and himself to force a match out of McMahon.

On the March 5 episode of SmackDown, ShoMiz (Big Show and The Miz) were scheduled to defend their Unified WWE Tag Team Championship at the event against a team who won a triple threat match between Cryme Tyme (Shad Gaspard and JTG), The Hart Dynasty (Davey Boy Smith Jr. and Tyson Kidd), and the pairing of The Miz's former partner John Morrison and R-Truth. Morrison and Truth would go on to win the qualifying match.

At the previous month's Elimination Chamber event, then-WWE Champion, Sheamus, was eliminated from Raw's Elimination Chamber match by Triple H. Two weeks later, Sheamus ambushed Triple H following his match teaming with Shawn Michaels against The Big Show and The Miz, and beat him down. The following week on Raw, Sheamus issued a challenge to Triple H at WrestleMania, which saw him accept.

In early 2009, Randy Orton had formed a contingency known as The Legacy, also featuring Ted DiBiase and Cody Rhodes. Later in that year, Orton had grown frustrated with his group, leading to a number of verbal confrontations and an assault on DiBiase, leading to the three of them having their membership being tested in matches under the threat of expulsion and a beat-down. The tension was staved off until the Royal Rumble which Rhodes accidentally prevented Orton from winning the WWE Championship. A similar result occurred the next month at the Elimination Chamber event with Rhodes trying to aide his partners in their Elimination Chamber match for the title as Orton was caught in the crossfire, leading to DiBiase eliminating Orton. And on the following night of Raw, Orton turned on his associates, leading to a triple threat match between the three men at WrestleMania.

Since the beginning of 2010, CM Punk and his storyline disciples Luke Gallows and Serena had been on a crusade of sorts in order to promote the message of straight edge, a lifestyle that abstains from alcohol, tobacco, and recreational drug use; he did so by preaching his gospel to the crowd and sometimes by "converting" members of the crowd by shaving their heads. The three of them would call themselves the Straight Edge Society. On the February 12 episode of SmackDown, Punk faced Rey Mysterio in a losing effort. Following the match, he and his group assaulted Mysterio, leading to a series of interference between the two. The animosity would escalate between the two on the March 12 episode of SmackDown, when Mysterio brought his family into the ring to commemorate his daughter, Aaliyah's, 9th birthday. Punk interrupted the celebration by threatening Mysterio and taunting his children as they left the ring. The events came to a boiling point to Mysterio and Punk preparing to face each other at WrestleMania. Following Mysterio's loss to Gallows, the pre-match stipulation for their match would be that if the former would lose, he would join the Straight Edge Society.

== Event ==
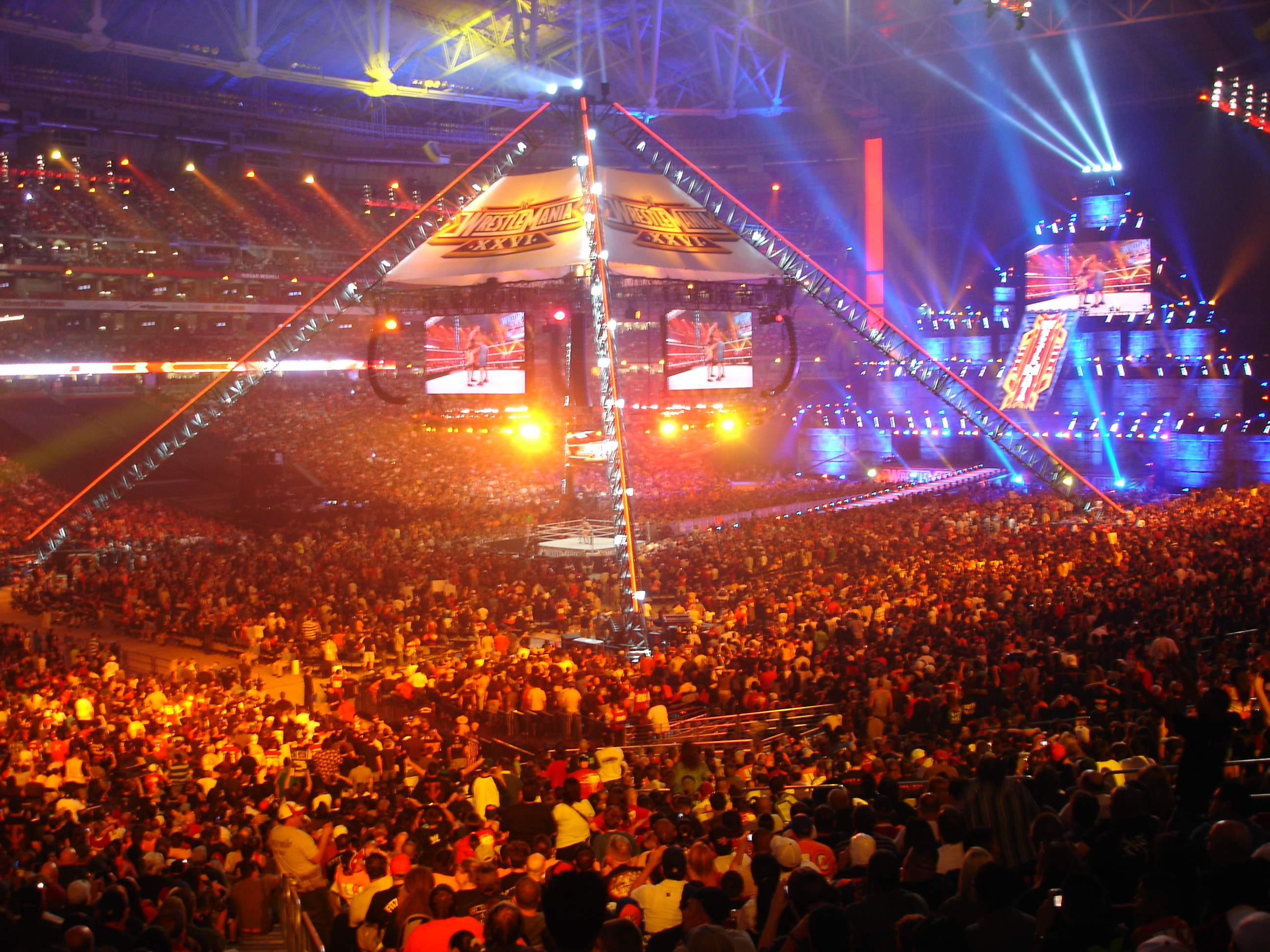
An attendance record-setting 72,219 fans at the University of Phoenix Stadium for WrestleMania XXVI

Other on-screen personnel
Role:	Name:
English commentators	Michael Cole
English commentators	Jerry Lawler
English commentators	Matt Striker
Spanish commentators	Carlos Cabrera
Spanish commentators	Hugo Savinovich
Ring announcers	Tony Chimel
Ring announcers	Justin Roberts
Ring announcers	Savannah (Money in the Bank/Battle Royal)
Ring announcers	Howard Finkel (WWE Hall of Fame)
Backstage interviewer	Josh Mathews
Referees	Mike Chioda
Referees	John Cone
Referees	Jack Doan
Referees	Bruce Hart
Referees	Chad Patton
Referees	Charles Robinson
Referees	Rod Zapata

=== Pre-show ===
A dark match was scheduled before the actual event, the superstars not involved in the event competed in a 26-man battle royal. Eventually Yoshi Tatsu, Zack Ryder, Finlay and Mike Knox were left. Finlay and Knox were eliminated by Ryder who himself was then kicked and eliminated by Tatsu to win the Battle Royal.

As the show went live, singer Fantasia performed the annual rendition of "America the Beautiful".

=== Preliminary matches ===
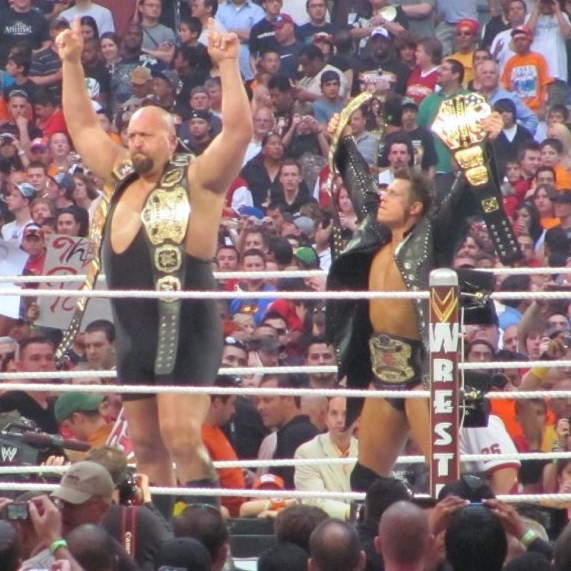
ShoMiz's (Big Show and The Miz) WrestleMania XXVI entrance.

The first match for the evening was a tag team match for the Unified WWE Tag Team Championship featuring champions ShoMiz (The Miz and Big Show) versus John Morrison and R-Truth. The Miz and Morrison started off the encounter, at one point Morrison attempted to hit Miz with the Starship Pain only for Big Show to come in for the save. Later, R-Truth tried to springboard onto the Big Show but was caught and hit against the ring post. The match ended when Big Show blind tagged himself in and knocked out Morrison, pinning him to win the match and retain the titles.

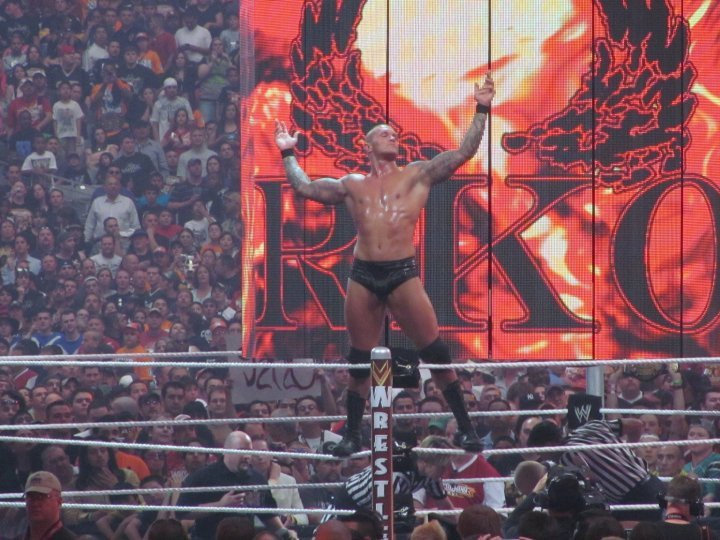
Randy Orton at WrestleMania XXVI

The second bout was a triple threat match between Randy Orton, Ted DiBiase, and Cody Rhodes, all formerly of the stable known as Legacy. Rhodes and DiBiase spent most of the match double teaming Orton, however when DiBiase attempted to pin Orton, he was stopped by Rhodes. This turned into a brawl between the two which led to Orton taking the advantage. The match ended when Orton punted Rhodes and executed the RKO on DiBiase to win the fall.

The annual Money in the Bank ladder match took place next, with Jack Swagger, Christian, Dolph Ziggler, Drew McIntyre, Evan Bourne, Kane, Kofi Kingston, Montel Vontavious Porter, Shelton Benjamin, and Matt Hardy as the participants. It started off with every superstar trying to incapacitate each other long enough to climb and retrieve the briefcase. In between Swagger was stuck in between a ladder with Christian and Hardy hitting him with two ladders of their own. Another instance was when Bourne performed a shooting star press, known as Air Bourne, on Christian from a vertically placed ladder wedged between another and the middle rope. The match came to an end when Swagger hit Christian with the Money in the Bank briefcase and unhooked it to become the new Mr. Money in the Bank.

After that match, the WWE Hall of Fame Class of 2010 was introduced.

The fourth match was contested between Triple H and Sheamus. The match started with Sheamus taunting Triple H and calling himself the future of the business. He then spent most of the time dominating Triple H with his backbreaker and submission moves. Triple H then took back control of the match by performing a Facebreaker knee smash and spinebuster on Sheamus. Sheamus then executed a Brogue Kick on Triple H for a near-fall, and then tried to execute a powerbomb only for Triple H to reverse and execute a Pedigree to win the match.

In the fifth match, CM Punk faced Rey Mysterio. A malfunction in Mysterio's opening delayed the match. The bout went evenly matched throughout with neither superstars managing to get the advantage for long. CM Punk's disciples Luke Gallows and Serena attempted to interfere throughout the match. The end came when Serena distracted the referee and Gallows tried to distract Rey Mysterio. Punk lifted Mysterio from behind and attempted to execute the G.T.S but was reversed into the 619. Mysterio then executed a diving splash and pinned him for the win.

Mr. McMahon took on Bret Hart next, with Bruce Hart as the special guest referee. McMahon entered and informed Hart that he wanted to give him a "WrestleMania sized" screwing and called out Hart's family, asserting he had paid them to turn on Hart. Hart then informed McMahon that his family had informed him about this before and that they would screw Vince instead. The match included members of the Hart family including The Hart Dynasty beating on McMahon. Hart then placed McMahon in the Sharpshooter, with McMahon tapping out to end the match.

=== Main event matches ===
The seventh match was for the World Heavyweight Championship between Edge and reigning champion Chris Jericho. Each man tried to get the better of each other only to be countered every time. Edge tried for a Spear but Jericho countered with a Codebreaker for a near-fall. He applied the Walls of Jericho, but Edge was able to break the hold. The match ended when Jericho hit Edge with the championship belt and executed a second Codebreaker to win and retain his title. After the match, Jericho attempted to attack Edge but was fought off and speared by Edge through the barricade.

Next, a ten-diva tag team match pitted Michelle McCool, Maryse, Layla, Alicia Fox, and Vickie Guerrero against Mickie James, Beth Phoenix, Eve, Kelly Kelly, and Gail Kim. Guerrero pinned Kelly to win the match for her team.

The penultimate match was Batista defending the WWE Championship against John Cena. Cena entered the ring after a performance from the U.S. Air Force Honor Guard Drill Team. Batista dominated the first half of the match. Cena made a return after hitting a suplex. The match started to go evenly after that. An instance included Cena executing the Five Knuckle Shuffle off the top turnbuckle. Then Batista delivered a Batista Bomb for a two-count and Cena delivered an Attitude Adjustment for a two-count. The match came to an end after Cena reversed a Batista Bomb into an STF. Batista eventually submitted. Cena won the match and the WWE Championship, making him a nine-time WWE world champion.

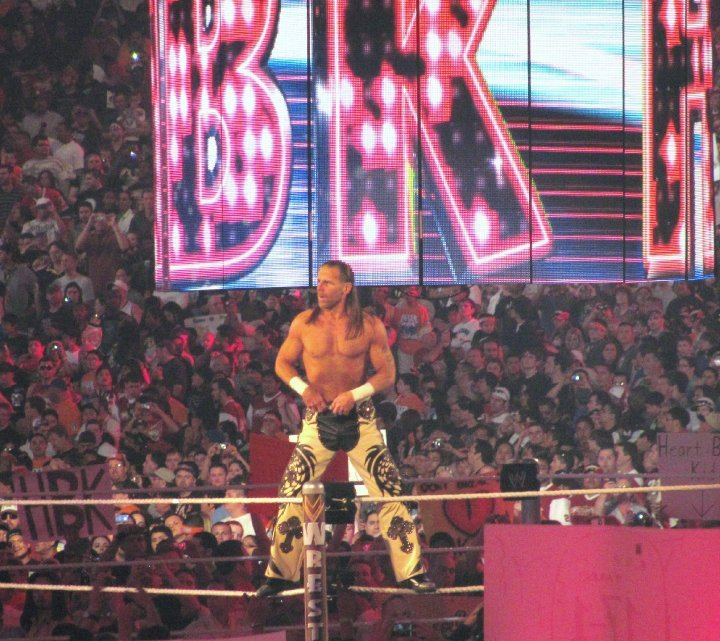
Shawn Michaels' WrestleMania XXVI entrance

The 10th and final match of the event was billed as "Streak vs Career" and pitted The Undertaker's streak against Shawn Michaels' career. The match started out with both men executing their signature moves early on. The Undertaker injured his leg while performing Old School and Michaels focused on his leg. The action then went outside the ring. An instance included The Undertaker executing a Tombstone Piledriver on the stadium floor, but Michaels kicked out when The Undertaker tried to pin him in the ring. Later in the match, Michaels executed a Sweet Chin Music for a near-fall. Soon after, The Undertaker also executed a Chokeslam and a Last Ride successfully, but Michaels kicked out of each. Michaels also applied numerous submission maneuvers on The Undertaker's injured ankle, such as the Ankle Lock, Figure Four Leglock, and Crossface, but The Undertaker was successful in countering all of them. The Undertaker also applied the Hell's Gate, but Michaels reversed it into a pin attempt, with The Undertaker kicking out at two. When the action spilled outside again, The Undertaker attempted a Last Ride on the announce table, but Michaels countered it and executed a second Sweet Chin Music, which placed The Undertaker on top of the announce table. Michaels performed a moonsault aiming at The Undertaker's injured ankle through the announce table. After taking The Undertaker back in the ring again, Michaels then executed his third Sweet Chin Music for a dramatic near-fall. Michaels then attempted Sweet Chin Music again but The Undertaker countered into a Chokeslam, and quickly followed up by executing a second Tombstone Piledriver for a near fall. The Undertaker began to signal the end for Michaels, but stopped his cut-throat action and told Michaels to stay down. Michaels, however, taunted The Undertaker by completing the action on his own and slapping him in the face. Then The Undertaker responded with a third jumping Tombstone Piledriver and pinned the fallen Michaels for the win, and extended his undefeated streak at WrestleMania to 18–0, ending Michaels' career. After the match, the two shook hands and embraced. The Undertaker soon left and Michaels interacted with the fans for the final time as the event came to a close.

== Reception ==
The event has received mixed to positive reviews from critics. Canadian Online Explorer's professional wrestling section gave the entire event 6.5 out of 10, down from its WrestleMania 25 rating of 9 out of 10. The Money in the Bank ladder match received 7 out of 10, the World Heavyweight Championship match received 8 out of 10 and the WWE Championship received 6.5 out of 10. The main event received a 9.5 out of 10 rating. WrestleMania XXVI was also ranked 1st by YouTube wrestling channel Cultaholic in their 2020 ranking of every 2010 PPV from Worst to Best.

The main event was ranked as the best WrestleMania main event of all time by Cultaholic in 2019. Drew McIntyre, who was originally supposed to face The Undertaker at the event, called the bout "a phenomenal match".

== Aftermath ==
=== Raw ===
The next night on Raw, Shawn Michaels gave his farewell address to the fans. The episode was a tribute to Michaels, with many vignettes airing periodically before commercials, highlighting his accomplishments and his greatest matches. In his address, Michaels thanked all the fans and specifically Vince McMahon, Bret Hart and Triple H on supporting him throughout his career. The Undertaker also made an appearance when he tipped his hat to Shawn as a sign of respect.

Before Michaels' farewell speech, Triple H came out and stated how much he would miss him and remembered all the good times they had. Before he could continue any more, however, he was attacked by his WrestleMania opponent Sheamus. This set up a rematch between the two in a Street Fight at Extreme Rules. Not only would Sheamus win that match, but he would also put Triple H out of action indefinitely following a round of Brogue Kicks to Triple H's skull.

The feud between Batista and John Cena continued as Batista came out and demanded he be awarded the WWE Championship back and that he never lost the match at WrestleMania in the first place. Later on, after a tag team match, Batista attacked Cena and said that he wouldn't be making anyone tap out anymore as he invoked his rematch clause at Extreme Rules and that it would be a Last Man Standing match. Cena emerged victorious after duct-taping Batista's legs to the ring post. The two would face off one final time at Over the Limit in an "I Quit" match, and after making him scream "I Quit!", Cena would then slam Batista through the stage set off the top of an automobile. The next night on Raw, an injured Batista quit the company out of frustration over the losses and new Raw general manager Bret Hart denying him a future rematch against Cena.

=== SmackDown ===
On the episode of SmackDown after WrestleMania, Chris Jericho came out to flaunt the fact that he had defeated Edge at the event. In the middle of his speech, Edge attacked him again and hit him with another spear after stripping Jericho, revealing his injured ribs as a result of Edge's spear at WrestleMania. Jack Swagger then came from behind and hit Edge with the Money in the Bank briefcase he had won at WrestleMania. He then cashed in his title opportunity and performed a Gutwrench Powerbomb on Jericho, thus winning the World Heavyweight Championship.

=== Future ===
This was WWE's only PPV event hosted at the University of Phoenix Stadium, renamed as State Farm Stadium in 2018, until the Royal Rumble in February 2027.

It was also the final WrestleMania held before the original World Tag Team Championship was deactivated in August in favor of the WWE Tag Team Championship, which became available to both brands; since WrestleMania 25 in April 2009, both titles were held and defended together across all brands as the Unified WWE Tag Team Championship. It would also be the final WrestleMania held before the original WWE Women's Championship was deactivated in September in favor of the WWE Divas Championship, which also became available to both brands.

== Results ==
No.	Results	Stipulations	Times
1^{P}	Yoshi Tatsu won by last eliminating Zack Ryder (Note: The other participants in elimination order: Primo, Slam Master J, Caylen Croft, Trent Barreta, Chavo Guerrero, Mark Henry, The Great Khali, Luke Gallows, JTG, Chris Masters, Tyson Kidd, David Hart Smith, Vladimir Kozlov, Kung Fu Naki, Goldust, Shad Gaspard, William Regal, Tyler Reks, Santino Marella, Jimmy Wang Yang, Vance Archer, Carlito, Finlay, Mike Knox, and Zack Ryder.)	26-man battle royal	8:31
2	ShoMiz (Big Show and The Miz) (c) defeated John Morrison and R-Truth by pinfall	Tag team match for the Unified WWE Tag Team Championship (Note: The name "Unified WWE Tag Team Championship" referred to both the World Tag Team Championship and WWE Tag Team Championship being held and defended together, although both titles remained independently active.)	3:20
3	Randy Orton defeated Cody Rhodes and Ted DiBiase Jr. by pinfall	Triple threat match	9:01
4	Jack Swagger defeated Christian, Dolph Ziggler, Drew McIntyre, Evan Bourne, Kane, Kofi Kingston, Matt Hardy, Montel Vontavious Porter, and Shelton Benjamin	Money in the Bank ladder match	13:40
5	Triple H defeated Sheamus by pinfall	Singles match	12:06
6	Rey Mysterio defeated CM Punk (with Luke Gallows and Serena)	Singles match Had Mysterio lost, he would have had to join the Straight Edge Society	6:30
7	Bret Hart defeated Mr. McMahon by submission	No Holds Barred Lumberjack match with Bruce Hart as special guest referee	11:09
8	Chris Jericho (c) defeated Edge by pinfall	Singles match for the World Heavyweight Championship	15:45
9	Alicia Fox, LayCool (Layla and Michelle McCool), Maryse, and Vickie Guerrero defeated Beth Phoenix, Eve Torres, Gail Kim, Kelly Kelly, and Mickie James by pinfall	10-Diva tag team match	3:26
10	John Cena defeated Batista (c) by submission	Singles match for the WWE Championship	13:30
11	The Undertaker defeated Shawn Michaels by pinfall	No Disqualification Streak vs. Career match	24:00
(c) / – the champion(s) heading into the match; P / – the match was broadcast on the pre-show
