= ShoMiz =

Professional wrestling tag team

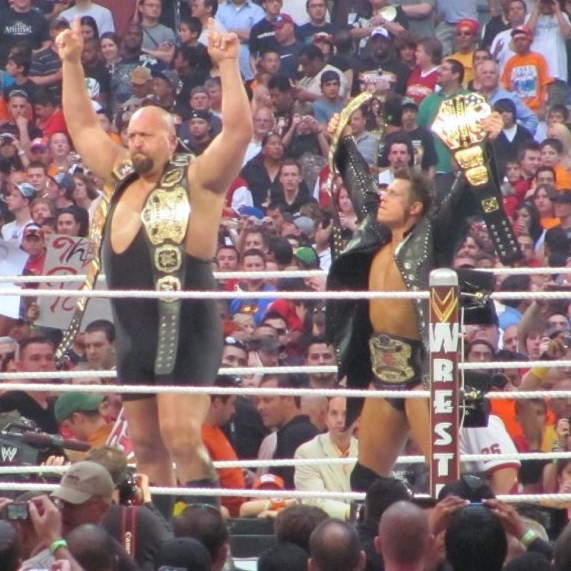
- ShoMiz as the Unified WWE Tag Team Champions at WrestleMania XXVI

Statistics
- Members: Big Show; The Miz
- Name(s): ShoMiz; The Big Show and The Miz
- Billed heights: Big Show: 7 ft 2 in (2.18 m); The Miz: 6 ft 2 in (1.88 m)
- Combined billed weight: 661 lb (300 kg)
- Debut: January 18, 2010
- Disbanded: April 26, 2010
- Years active: 2010

ShoMiz was a villainous professional wrestling tag team consisting of Big Show and The Miz, which competed in the World Wrestling Entertainment (WWE) promotion.

They were active in 2010 and won the Unified WWE Tag Team Championship, which was made by the unification of the World Tag Team Championship and WWE Tag Team Championship, while Miz also held the United States Championship. They were also featured as a team in two WWE's pay-per-view events, WrestleMania XXVI and Extreme Rules.

The team's name is a reference to showbiz.

== History ==
=== Formation (2010) ===
On the January 18, 2010 episode of Raw, after Big Show helped United States Champion The Miz by attacking Miz's rival, Montel Vontavious Porter (MVP), guest host Jon Heder arranged for Big Show and Miz to form a tag team to take on Shawn Michaels and Triple H of D-Generation X (DX).

=== Unified Tag Team Champions (2010) ===
On the February 8 episode of Raw, Big Show and The Miz, both villains, competed in a triple threat elimination match for the Unified WWE Tag Team Championship against The Straight Edge Society (CM Punk and Luke Gallows) and the defending champions DX, which Miz and Big Show won to capture the titles. At Elimination Chamber on February 21, Big Show interfered in Miz's United States Championship match against MVP, helping Miz retain the title. The next night on Raw, ShoMiz successfully retained their championships against MVP and Mark Henry. ShoMiz also retained the Unified WWE Tag Team Championship in a rematch against DX on the March 1 episode of Raw after Michaels was distracted by The Undertaker, and Triple H was then attacked by Sheamus.

On the March 5 episode of SmackDown, John Morrison and R-Truth defeated Cryme Tyme (Shad Gaspard and JTG) and The Hart Dynasty (David Hart Smith and Tyson Kidd) to earn a shot at ShoMiz's Unified WWE Tag Team Championship at WrestleMania XXVI. On the next episode of Raw, The Miz mocked the new challengers, claiming that no one in the locker room was worthy enough to face ShoMiz, but Morrison and Truth laid out ShoMiz during a "WrestleMania preview" which went to a no contest. In the following weeks, both Morrison and Truth would pin The Miz during singles matches, and ShoMiz was once again laid out by Morrison and Truth on the March 26 episode of SmackDown. However, ShoMiz would successfully defend the Unified WWE Tag Team Championship against Morrison and Truth at WrestleMania on March 28.

ShoMiz then started a feud with The Hart Dynasty on the March 29 episode of Raw, when ShoMiz interrupted Bret Hart's speech, prompting The Hart Dynasty to come out to back up Bret, who challenged ShoMiz on The Hart Dynasty's behalf, which Miz accepted despite Big Show's protests to walk away, but that match ended in a no contest. At Extreme Rules on April 25, after ShoMiz came out and bragged about themselves, challenging anyone to face them, SmackDown General Manager Theodore Long ruled that ShoMiz had to face three tag teams in succession in a gauntlet match, and that the team who defeated ShoMiz would get a title match the next night on Raw. ShoMiz managed to beat the first two teams in the gauntlet match (John Morrison and R-Truth by disqualification, and then Mark Henry and MVP), but The Hart Dynasty managed to beat ShoMiz to earn their title shot.

=== Split (2010) ===
On the following episode of Raw, ShoMiz lost the Unified WWE Tag Team Championship to The Hart Dynasty after The Miz submitted to the sharpshooter, after which Big Show knocked out Miz with a right-handed knockout hook, turning into a fan favorite and symbolizing their break-up. The pair reunited for a match on the November 2, 2012, episode of Smackdown, which included The Miz reminiscing about the team's dominance. They were placed in an impromptu match against Kofi Kingston and Sheamus; although animosity was teased between the former ShoMiz members, they were victorious by pinfall.

== Championships and accomplishments ==
- World Wrestling Entertainment
  - World Tag Team Championship (1 time)
  - Unified WWE Tag Team Championship (1 time)
  - WWE United States Championship (1 time) – The Miz
