= R-Truth =

American professional wrestler (born 1972)

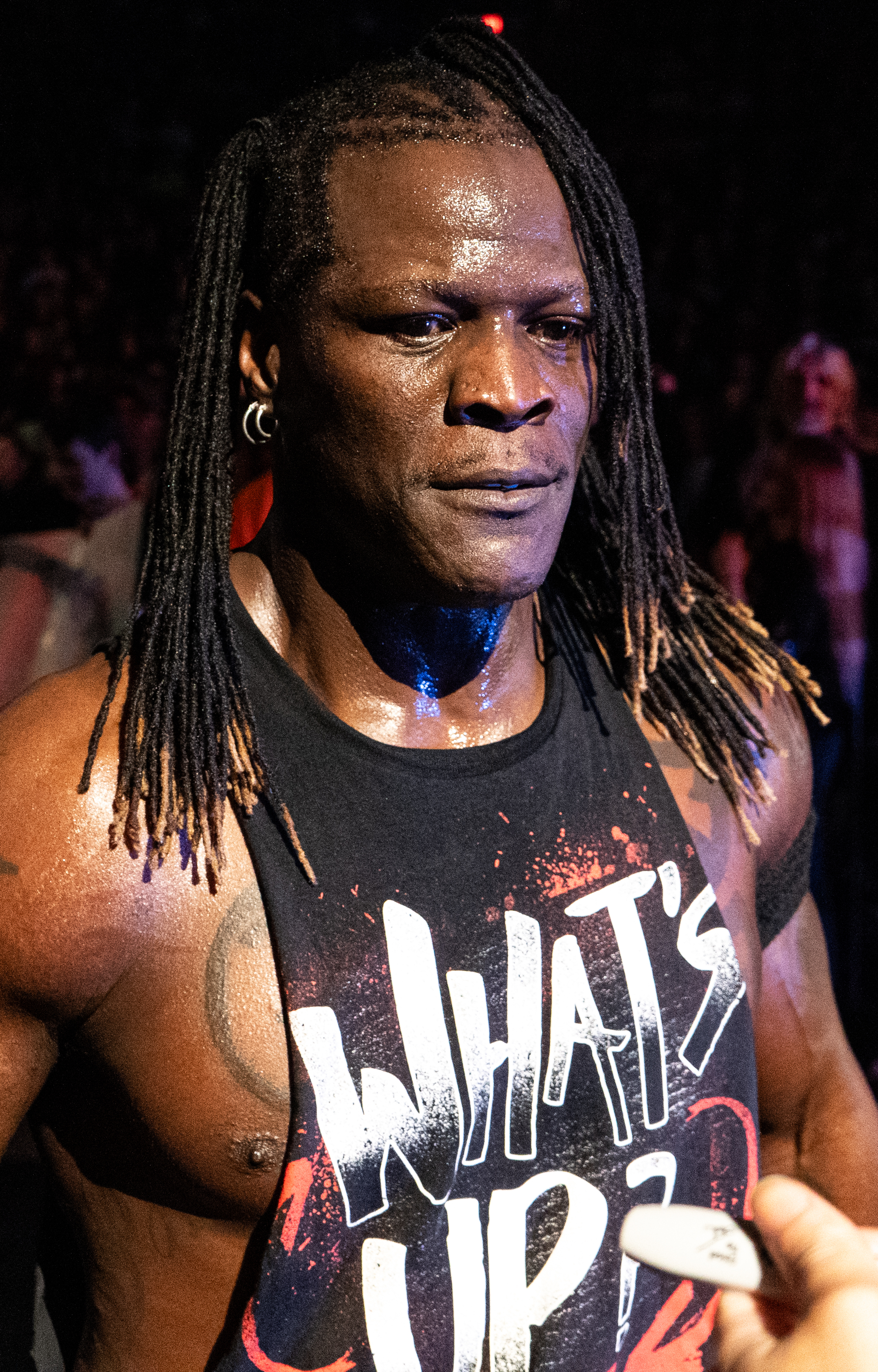
- R-Truth in 2024

Personal information
- Born: Ronnie Aaron Killings; January 19, 1972 (age 54) Charlotte, North Carolina, U.S.
- Spouse: Pamela Killings (m. 2011)
- Children: 5
- Website: theofficialronkillings.com

Professional wrestling career
- Ring name(s): K. Malik Shabaz; K-Kwik; K-Krush; Ron Killings; R-Truth; R–Ziggler; Ron Cena
- Billed height: 6 ft 2 in (188 cm)
- Billed weight: 220 lb (100 kg)
- Billed from: Charlotte, North Carolina
- Trained by: Chris Hamrick; George South; Italian Stallion; Manny Fernandez
- Debut: October 30, 1999
- Musical career
- Genre: Hip hop
- Instrument: Vocals
- Years active: 2001–present
- Labels: K-Krush Enterprises; WWE Music Group

Ronnie Aaron Killings (born January 19, 1972) is an American professional wrestler. He is signed to WWE, where he performs on the SmackDown brand under the ring name R-Truth.

Killings worked for World Wrestling Federation (WWF, now WWE) as K-Kwik from 2000 to 2001, forming a team with "Road Dogg" Jesse James, and winning the WWF Hardcore Championship twice. After his release in 2002, he joined Jeff Jarrett's new promotion Total Nonstop Action Wrestling (TNA). As Ron "The Truth" Killings, he headlined numerous pay-per-view (PPV) events and won the NWA World Heavyweight Championship twice, being the first African-American titleholder. He also formed 3 Live Kru with BG James (formerly Road Dogg) and Konnan and the trio held the NWA World Tag Team Championship twice. Killings established Team Pacman with football player Adam Jones and won the TNA World Tag Team Championship before leaving TNA in late 2007.

Killings returned to WWE in 2008 and was renamed R-Truth, winning the WWE United States Championship, and the WWE Tag Team Championship (with Kofi Kingston) over the next several years. He headlined multiple WWE pay-per-view events during the early 2010s, including matches for the WWE Championship and World Heavyweight Championship. He was thereafter used in comedic roles and primarily wrestled on the undercard until 2018, when he teamed with Carmella to win the second edition of Mixed Match Challenge. He then captured the United States Championship for a second time in 2019. Later that year, he won the newly instated WWE 24/7 Championship, and holds the record for the most reigns at 54. At WrestleMania XL, in the six-pack ladder match he ultimately won the Raw Tag Team Championship with The Miz.

== Early life ==
Ronnie Aaron Killings was born on January 19, 1972, in Charlotte, North Carolina. To make extra money in his early 20s, Killings would sell cocaine on the streets for extra income. From a young age, Killings had developed a love for hip hop and breakdancing and attended Harry P. Harding High School where he competed in football alongside future MLB second baseman Ray Durham. Killings also competed in track and field, and was talented at both sports, receiving various college scholarships, but turned them down to further pursue a career in music. Killings graduated high school in 1991, but he also continued dealing drugs in order to help his music career financially and was arrested four different times, spending small amounts of time in jail before eventually spending 13 months incarcerated. Killings spoke in an interview with Lilian Garcia that after this incident, he was finished with that lifestyle.

== Professional wrestling career ==
=== Early career (1997–1999) ===
Jackie Crockett of the National Wrestling Alliance met Killings at a halfway house after Killings' release from prison, and tried to convince Killings to become a professional wrestler, but he was determined to focus on his music career. Killings spent two years working on his music career and then contacted Crockett once more and expressed an interest in becoming a wrestler. Crockett, by now the senior cameraman for World Championship Wrestling, took Killings to several WCW and Pro Wrestling Federation events, introducing him to wrestling personalities.

Killings debuted in the Pro Wrestling Federation (PWF) in 1997 as a manager, then spent two years traveling and training with Manny Fernandez. In 1999, he debuted in NWA Wildside as K-Krush, where he won the NWA Wildside Television Championship on November 6, 1999, after defeating AJ Styles.

=== World Wrestling Federation (1999–2001) ===
At the urging of Rick Michaels, Killings sent a promotional videotape to the World Wrestling Federation (WWF). He was signed to a two-year developmental contract in 1999 and under the ring name K-Kwik was assigned to Memphis Championship Wrestling, a WWF developmental territory. On April 12, 2000, in Robinsonville, Mississippi, he won a battle royal to claim the vacant Southern Heavyweight Championship. He lost the title to a masked Jerry Lawler on May 24 in Tunica, Mississippi, but reclaimed it from Joey Abs several months later in Memphis, Tennessee on August 19. His second reign ended on November 3, when he lost to Steve Bradley in Manila, Arkansas.

K-Kwik was then promoted to the main roster and put in a tag team with Road Dogg. He debuted on the November 13, 2000 episode of Raw is War, attacking William Regal during a match against Road Dogg. K-Kwik and Road Dogg began rapping together, performing a song called "Gettin' Rowdy" as they approached the ring. Upon the return of Road Dogg's former partner Billy Gunn later that month, K-Kwik was involved in a D-Generation X (DX) quasi-reunion. At Survivor Series, K-Kwik teamed with former DX members Road Dogg, Billy Gunn, and Chyna to face The Radicalz in a Survivor Series match. K-Kwik was eliminated and the Radicalz went on to win the match. At Armageddon, K-Kwik and Road Dogg took part in a four-way tag team match for the Tag Team Championship, which was won by Edge and Christian.

After Road Dogg was suspended in December and eventually released on January 26, 2001, K-Kwik became a singles competitor and a successful mainstay on Jakked. He took part in the 2001 Royal Rumble, but was eliminated by Big Show. K-Kwik then began competing in the hardcore division. He defeated Raven for the Hardcore Championship on February 3, but lost the title to Crash Holly that same evening under the title's 24/7 rules. He defeated Raven for the title a second time on the following night, but once again he lost the title to Holly within the space of several hours. K-Kwik became somewhat of a background figure of "The Invasion" angle during the summer months, often seen in dressing rooms and watching television with other superstars during inter-promotional matches. He was released from the WWF in August 2001.

=== Xtreme Pro Wrestling (2002) ===
In 2002, he wrestled for Xtreme Pro Wrestling (XPW) as K. Malik Shabaz.

=== NWA: Total Nonstop Action / Total Nonstop Action Wrestling (2002-2007) ===
==== NWA World Heavyweight Champion (2002–2003) ====
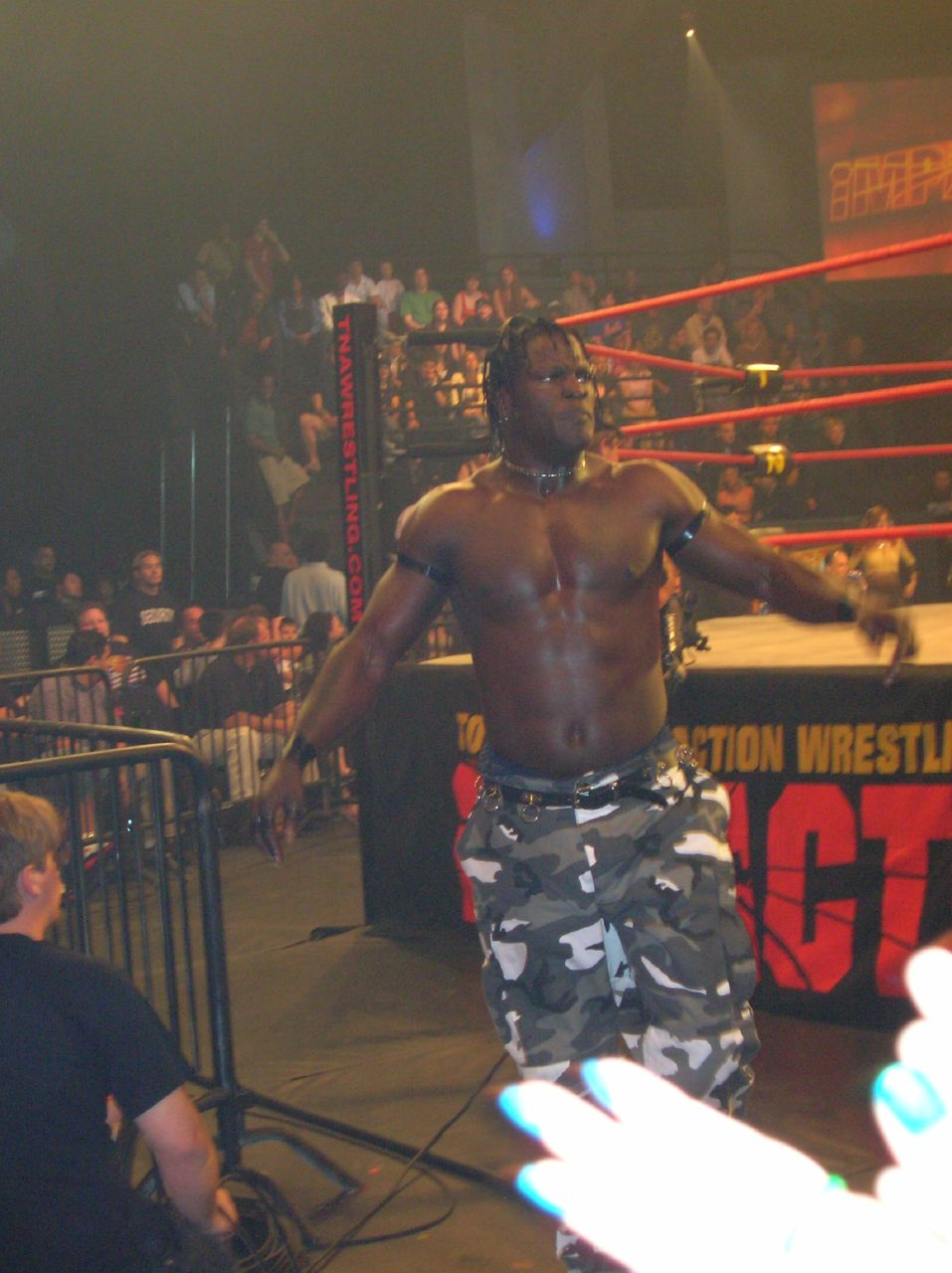
Killings at a TNA event in January 2006

Killings signed with the Nashville, Tennessee-based NWA: Total Nonstop Action (NWA:TNA) promotion in June 2002, and appeared on the first weekly TNA pay-per-view on June 19 as K-Krush. Killings immediately established himself as a heel by harassing NASCAR drivers Sterling Marlin and Hermie Sadler until he was attacked by Brian Lawler. Later that same evening, he participated in the Gauntlet for the Gold match, but was eliminated by Malice. The following week, Killings lost to Christopher after Marlin and Sadler interfered in their match. On July 3, Killings and Jeff Jarrett defeated Christopher and Scott Hall after Christopher turned on Hall during the match, aligning himself with Killings and Jarrett. On July 10, Killings defeated Hermie Sadler in a squash match. The decision, however, was overturned after Killings continued to attack Sadler after he had been awarded the match.

On the July 17 TNA pay-per-view, Killings delivered a promo where, in storyline, he implied that he had been held back as a result of his race. He then stated that he was to be referred to as "The Truth". Killings eventually began using his own name, referring to himself as Ron "The Truth" Killings. Killings defeated Ken Shamrock for the NWA World Heavyweight Championship at NWA-TNA 8 on August 7, thus becoming the first-ever, and to date only, recognized African-American NWA World Heavyweight Champion in history, and the fourth African American in professional wrestling history to win a World Heavyweight title. He successfully defended the title in matches with Monty Brown, Jerry Lynn, Low Ki, Curt Hennig, and Scott Hall before losing on November 20 to Jeff Jarrett who had the help of Vince Russo. As a result of Russo's involvement, Killings turned into a face. In subsequent months, Killings feuded with Sports Entertainment Xtreme before turning into a heel once again by attacking Jarrett on March 19. He later introduced Nelson Knight as his bodyguard.

==== 3 Live Kru (2003–2005) ====
Between May and June, Killings began teaming with Konnan and former WWE ally B.G. James. In July the trio formed a faction known as the 3 Live Kru. The Kru first wrestled as a unit on August 13, 2003, defeating The Disciples of the New Church (Sinn, Vampire Warrior, and Devon Storm). The Kru soon went after the NWA World Tag Team Championship. On November 26, the Kru defeated Simon Diamond, Johnny Swinger, and Glenn Gilberti in a six-man tag team match with the vacant NWA World Tag Team Championship on the line. The NWA World Tag Team Championship was held by all three members of the Kru as part of the Freebird Rule until January 28, 2004, when they were defeated by Redshirt Security (Kevin Northcutt and Legend).

After several abortive attempts to regain the tag title, the Kru began supporting Killings' bid to become NWA World Heavyweight Champion. On June 9, NWA World Heavyweight Champion Jeff Jarrett took part in a "3 Live Kru Challenge" which saw him face Konnan, James and Killings in three subsequent matches. Jarrett defeated Konnan in a strap match and James in a "trailer park trash match" (hardcore match), but lost to Killings in a "Ghetto Justice match". On May 19, Killings faced NWA World Heavyweight Champion A.J. Styles, Raven, and Chris Harris in a four-way title match. He won the bout, becoming a two-time NWA World Heavyweight Champion, after Jarrett hit Styles with a guitar. His reign lasted until June 2, when Jarrett defeated him in a King of the Mountain match which also included Harris, Styles, and Raven. The Kru went on to feud with Jarrett's mercenaries, the Elite Guard (Chad Collyer, Hotstuff Hernandez, and Onyx). On July 14, the 3 Live Kru, Dusty Rhodes, and Larry Zbyszko defeated Jarrett, Ken Shamrock, and the Elite Guard in a ten-man tag team match. The Kru began feuding with Team Canada in August. At Victory Road on November 7, Konnan and James defeated Team Canada members Bobby Roode and Eric Young for the NWA World Tag Team Championship. After Konnan suffered an injury, Killings and James lost the title to Team Canada at Turning Point on December 5. Throughout early-2005, the Kru feuded with Michael Shane and Kazarian, Team Canada, and The Naturals.

Dissension arose after James' former tag team partner from the WWE, Billy Gunn, joined TNA as "The New Age Outlaw" and began trying to convince James to reform their former tag team, the New Age Outlaws. Killings and Konnan feuded with The Outlaw and Monty Brown, with James's loyalties divided. Brown and The Outlaw, who had by now renamed himself "Kip James" as a psychological ploy, defeated Killings and Konnan at No Surrender on July 17, with James declining to help either team. Killings and Konnan became increasingly frustrated, at one point referring to themselves as the "2Live Kru", although Killings repeatedly attempted to act as a mediator between James and Konnan. The two teams faced one another in a No Surrender rematch on August 14 at Sacrifice, with James appointed special guest referee by Director of Authority, Larry Zbyszko. James reaffirmed his loyalty to the Kru by attacking Kip, enabling Konnan to pin him and win the match. The 3 Live Kru won a six-man tag team match against The Diamonds in the Rough at Unbreakable on September 11. After Impact! premiered on Spike TV on October 1, Kip James entered the picture once more, but appeared to be helping 3LK this time. He refereed a Hockey Stick Fight at Genesis on November 13, which 3LK won. Kip James later joined the stable, which became known as the 4 Live Kru. On December 11 at Turning Point, the 4 Live Kru faced Team Canada in an eight-man tag match. In the course of the match, Konnan hit Kip and B.G. James with chair shots, enabling Bobby Roode to pin Kip. He then attempted to celebrate with Killings, who appeared shocked by Konnan's actions. Killings later told Konnan he was done with the Kru.

==== Various tag teams (2005–2007) ====
Following the breakup of the 3 Live Kru, Killings began competing as a singles wrestler once more. He briefly aligned himself with Sting in March, teaming with Sting, A.J. Styles, and Rhino as "Sting's Warriors". At Lockdown on April 23, Sting's Warriors defeated Jarrett's Army in a Lethal Lockdown match. On the May 25 episode of Impact!, Killings defeated Monty Brown to qualify for a King of the Mountain match for the NWA World Heavyweight Championship at Slammiversary on June 18. At Slammiversary, however, Killings failed to win the championship. Killings then teamed with Lance Hoyt in the following months, even participating, but losing, in a Battle Royal at No Surrender. On November 19 at Genesis, Killings and his tag team partner Lance Hoyt defeated Austin Starr and Alex Shelley with Kevin Nash at ringside. He then took time off the active roster due to injury. Killings returned to action at Slammiversary, teaming with James Storm in a losing effort against Frank Wycheck and Jerry Lynn.

On June 19, Killings tried to resign from TNA, intending to work for the Mexican AAA. Amidst more dissension backstage, however, TNA refused to release Killings. He returned to TNA on August 12 at Hard Justice, confronting football player Adam Jones. At No Surrender, Adam "Pacman" Jones and Ron Killings defeated Sting and Kurt Angle to win the TNA World Tag Team Championship. At Bound for Glory, A.J. Styles and Tomko defeated him and Jones' replacement, Rasheed Lucius "Consequences" Creed, for the TNA World Tag Team Championship. In December, he worked out a deal for his release from the company.

=== Return to WWE (2008–present) ===
==== Early feuds (2008–2010) ====
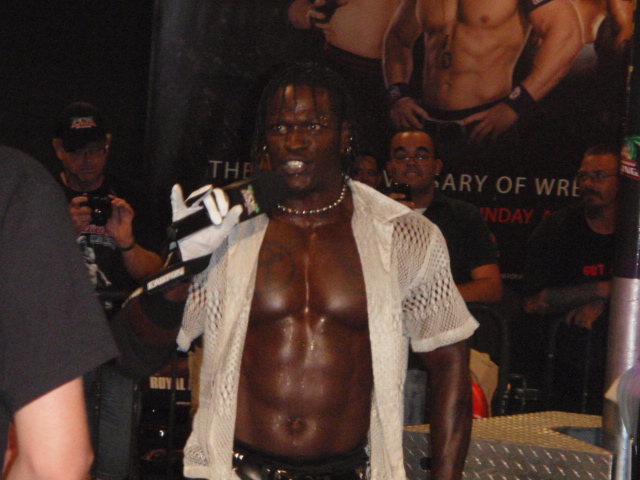
R-Truth in 2009

In 2008, Killings re-signed with World Wrestling Entertainment (WWE), formerly the World Wrestling Federation (WWF), and re-debuted on the SmackDown brand under the ring name R-Truth on August 29, as a face, defeating Kenny Dykstra. WWE completely ignored his past with the company and his Hardcore Championship reigns until January 2009 when WWE.com briefly acknowledged his appearance in the 2001 Royal Rumble. The K-Kwik character was acknowledged again at SummerSlam 2010, when commentator Matt Striker made a passing reference to his past. At Cyber Sunday, he, along with Festus and Montel Vontavious Porter (MVP), was a voting option to challenge United States Champion Shelton Benjamin for the title. He received 59% of the vote to get the match, but lost. On December 8, he won the Slammy Award for the Best Musical Performance.

On the July 10, 2009 episode of SmackDown, R-Truth debuted a new prankster character known as Ricky, in a sleeveless T-shirt and a set of fake teeth trying to get into the Rabobank Arena. The character was soon scrapped and R-Truth began a feud with the debuting Drew McIntyre on the August 28 episode of SmackDown. This feud set up a match at Hell in a Cell, which he lost. On the October 23 episode of SmackDown, R-Truth, Finlay, Matt Hardy and The Hart Dynasty defeated JTG, Eric Escobar, Dolph Ziggler and Drew McIntyre in a five-on-four handicap match to qualify as the representatives of Team SmackDown at Bragging Rights. At the event, Team SmackDown defeated Team Raw. On the February 5, 2010 episode of SmackDown, after defeating Mike Knox, R-Truth qualified for an Elimination Chamber match for the World Heavyweight Championship at Elimination Chamber, which he was eliminated by CM Punk. At WrestleMania XXVI, R-Truth teamed with John Morrison to face ShoMiz (Big Show and The Miz) for the Unified WWE Tag Team Championship in a losing effort.

==== United States Champion (2010–2011) ====
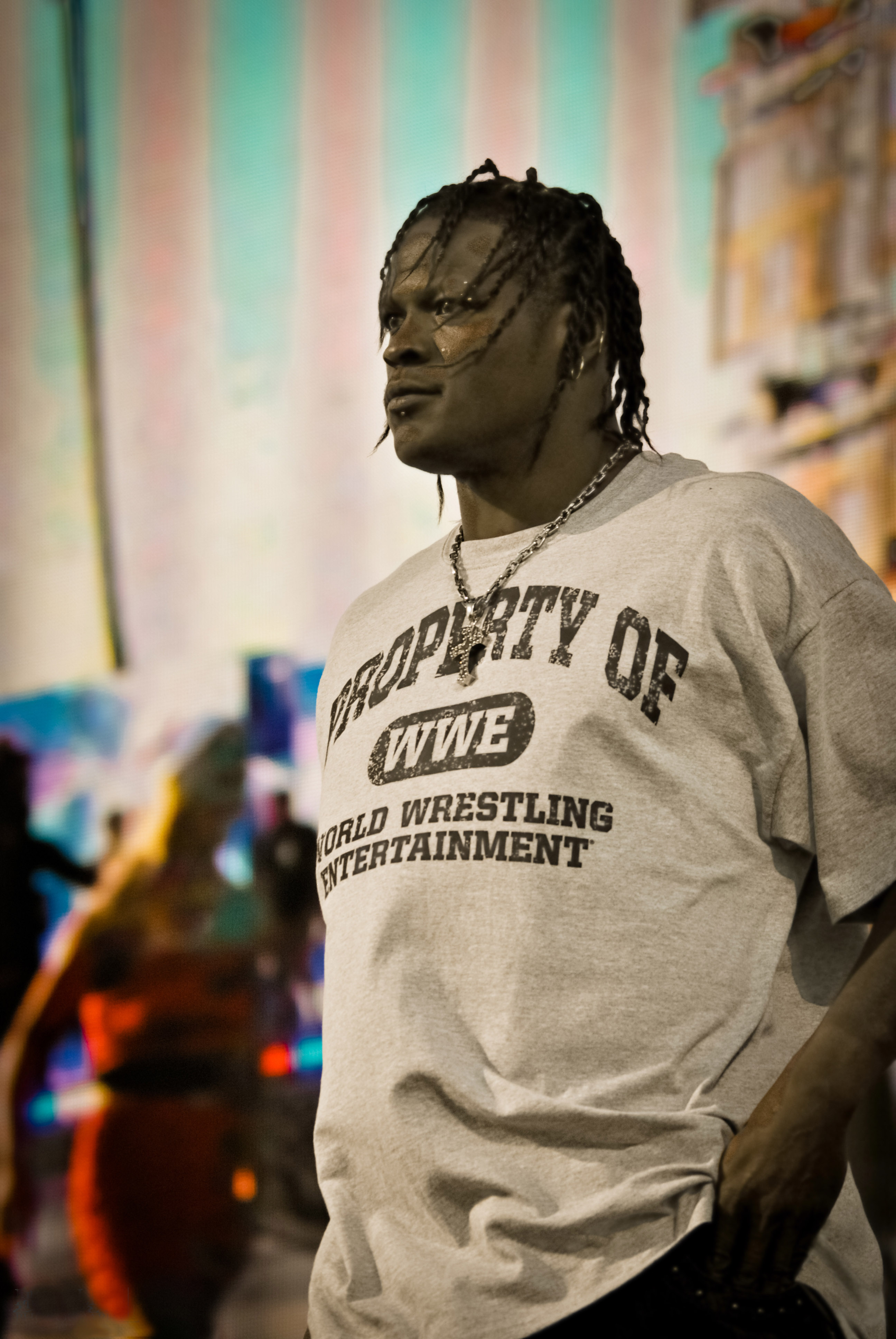
R-Truth at the WWE Tribute to the Troops event in December 2010

On April 26, R-Truth was drafted to Raw as part of the 2010 WWE draft. He began a feud with Ted DiBiase after DiBiase offered him a job as his personal assistant, which R-Truth declined with a slap. Two weeks later, during a match with William Regal, R-Truth was attacked by Carlito and Primo, who were paid off by DiBiase after the assault. R-Truth went on to wrestle and defeat DiBiase at Over the Limit on May 23. The next night on Raw, R-Truth defeated The Miz to win the vacant United States Championship, giving him his first singles championship since returning to WWE. On the June 14 episode of Raw, R-Truth lost the United States Championship to The Miz in a fatal four-way match also featuring John Morrison and Zack Ryder. He invoked his rematch clause at Fatal 4-Way, but was unsuccessful.

At SummerSlam, R-Truth was part of Team WWE, defeating The Nexus. On the October 11 episode of Raw, he defeated Ted DiBiase to qualify for Team Raw at Bragging Rights to face Team SmackDown. Team Raw lost the match for the second consecutive time. In December, R-Truth mentored Johnny Curtis in the NXT's fourth season. In January 2011, R-Truth competed in the 2011 Royal Rumble match, but was eliminated by CM Punk. On March 1, Curtis won the fourth season of NXT. As winners, R-Truth and Curtis won the right to challenge for the Tag Team Championship.

==== Little Jimmy and Awesome Truth (2011–2012) ====
On the April 11 episode of Raw, R-Truth became the number one contender for the WWE Championship along with John Cena via double disqualification after The Miz and Alex Riley attacked both of them during a number one contender's gauntlet match. R-Truth had previously defeated Dolph Ziggler and John Morrison prior to facing Cena at the end of the gauntlet. The anonymous Raw General Manager stated that, due to interference from The Miz and Riley, R-Truth and Cena would both compete for the WWE Championship at Extreme Rules in a steel cage match. On the April 18 episode of Raw, Morrison questioned R-Truth about his capability to compete in a match like this and challenged R-Truth to a match for his spot. Later that night, after Morrison won the match, R-Truth attacked Morrison, turning heel in the process. The following week on Raw, R-Truth stated that he was done entertaining the fans as popularity did not get him any titles. At Extreme Rules on May 1, R-Truth prevented Morrison from escaping the cage during the main event for the WWE Championship, ultimately costing him the title. On the May 9 episode of Raw, R-Truth revealed that his attack on Morrison had led to him being hospitalized before then attacking Rey Mysterio at the end of the show. On the May 16 episode of Raw, R-Truth accused Mysterio of being a "thief" and stealing his chance at the WWE Championship. R-Truth then attacked a weakened Mysterio, who had just finished a match with Alberto Del Rio. R-Truth faced Mysterio at Over the Limit, where he was victorious. After subsequent episodes of ranting and raving over John Cena's popularity, he harassed a young fan and his father on the May 30 episode of Raw, throwing a cup of soda in the father's face after a countout win over Cena. After Raw went off the air, the anonymous Raw General Manager scheduled a WWE Championship match between the two, on the condition that R-Truth apologize for his behavior the next week. On the June 6 episode of Raw, R-Truth made his way out to the ring, singing a song about "Little Jimmy" (referring to the children in attendance) and wearing a Confederate soldier's uniform, before apologizing for his actions. In the ensuing title match at Capitol Punishment, R-Truth was unsuccessful in winning the WWE Championship.

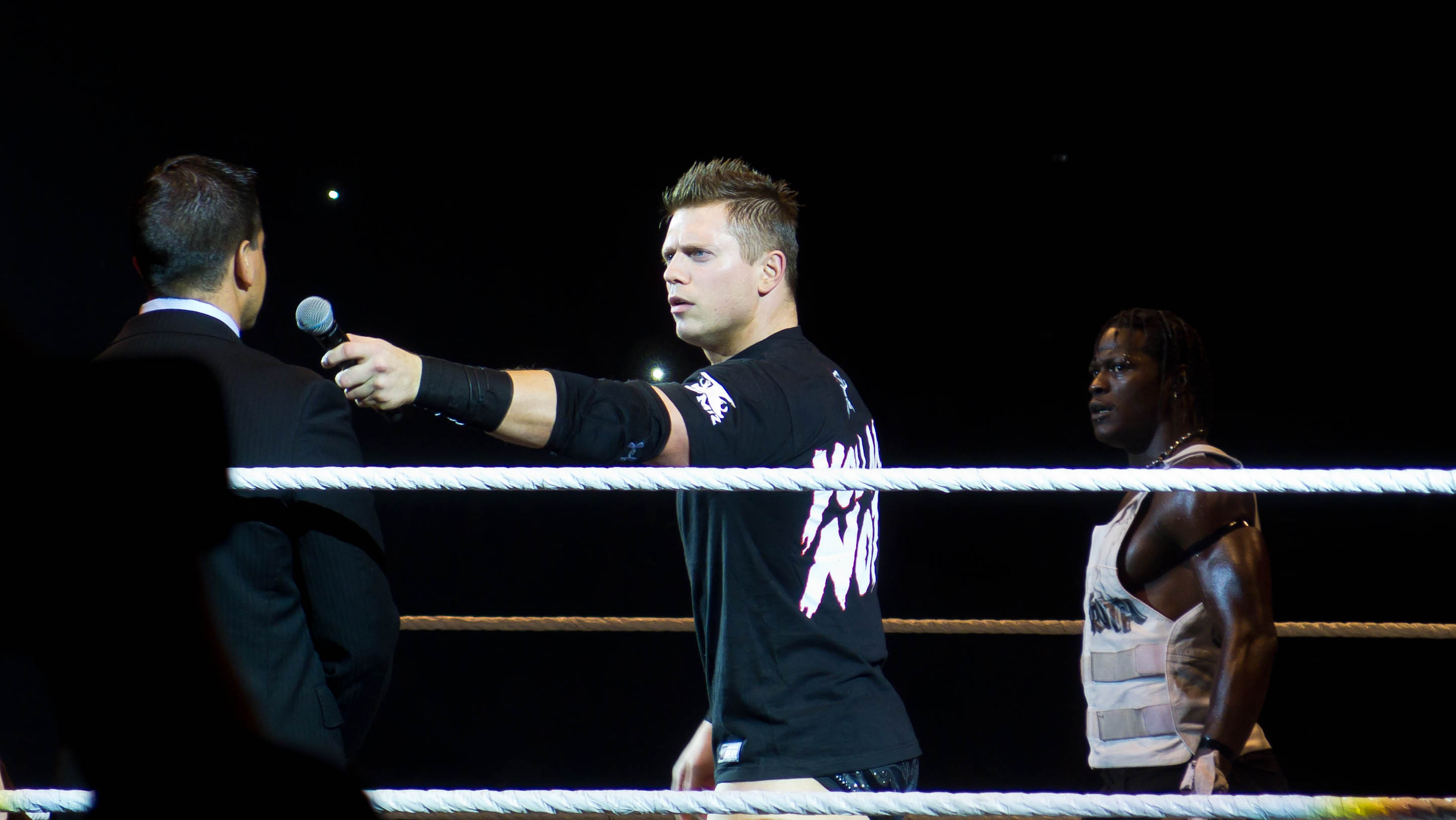
Awesome Truth in November 2011

On the August 22 episode of Raw, R-Truth and The Miz attacked Santino Marella before his match and then proceeded to cut a promo bashing Triple H about not using them properly. On the August 29 episode of Raw SuperShow, R-Truth interfered in The Miz's match and both of them attacked CM Punk. On the September 5 episode of Raw SuperShow, R-Truth and The Miz challenged Air Boom (Evan Bourne and Kofi Kingston) to a match for the WWE Tag Team Championship at Night of Champions, but were disqualified after Miz assaulted a referee during the match. R-Truth and The Miz were subsequently fired by Triple H the following night on Raw SuperShow. At Hell in a Cell, R-Truth and The Miz attacked Alberto Del Rio, CM Punk, John Cena and referees after the WWE Championship match ended. After this, the entire WWE roster came out to find a way into the Hell in a Cell structure before police officers were able to get the door open and arrest them. On the October 10 episode of Raw SuperShow, R-Truth and The Miz were reinstated by John Laurinaitis. At Vengeance, R-Truth and The Miz defeated CM Punk and Triple H in a tag team match, due to interference from Kevin Nash. Later that same night they attacked John Cena during his WWE Championship match with Alberto Del Rio, costing him the match. On November 20 at Survivor Series, R-Truth and The Miz were defeated by Cena and The Rock. The following night on Raw SuperShow, Cena instigated an argument between R-Truth and The Miz, which ultimately led to the team's dissolution as The Miz attacked R-Truth with a Skull Crushing Finale onto the stage. Following the event, Killings was suspended for 30 days for violating the Wellness Policy.

On the December 26 episode of Raw SuperShow, R-Truth returned to attack The Miz after The Miz lost to John Cena via countout, turning face once again in the process. This was followed by back-and-forth assaults on the two throughout January. At the Royal Rumble, R-Truth entered the Royal Rumble Match at entry #3, but was eliminated by The Miz. R-Truth wrestled for the WWE Championship against CM Punk, Chris Jericho, Dolph Ziggler, Kofi Kingston and The Miz at Elimination Chamber. He was eliminated by defending champion CM Punk.

==== Teaming with Kofi Kingston (2012–2013) ====
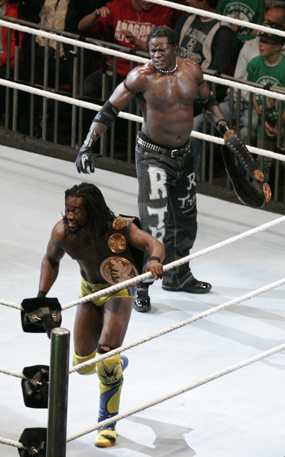
R-Truth (back) and Kofi Kingston as WWE Tag Team Champions

R-Truth then began to contend for the WWE Tag Team Championship with Kofi Kingston and competing against Primo and Epico and Dolph Ziggler and Jack Swagger, which they both won and lost respectively. On the February 27 episode of Raw SuperShow, R-Truth and Kingston failed to capture the WWE Tag Team Championship from Primo and Epico in a Triple Threat Tag Team Match, also involving Ziggler and Swagger. At WrestleMania XXVIII, R-Truth and Kingston were members of Team Teddy to face Team Johnny in a twelve-man tag team match to determine the general manager of both brands, which was eventually won by Team Johnny. On the April 30 episode of Raw SuperShow, R-Truth and Kofi Kingston defeated Primo and Epico to win the WWE Tag Team Championship. At Over the Limit, R-Truth and Kingston successfully defended the title against Dolph Ziggler and Jack Swagger and then again in a rematch on the May 28 episode of Raw SuperShow. In the pre-show of Money in the Bank, R-Truth and Kingston defeated Hunico and Camacho in a non-title match. The following night on Raw SuperShow, they successfully defended the Tag Team Championship against The Prime Time Players (Darren Young and Titus O'Neil), and again at SummerSlam. At Night of Champions, R-Truth and Kingston lost the Tag Team Championship to the team of Kane and Daniel Bryan and failed to regain the titles from the new champions the following night on Raw. After the show, R-Truth and Kingston dissolved their tag team.

R-Truth began feuding with United States Champion Antonio Cesaro on the October 29 episode of Raw, after saving former tag partner Kofi Kingston from a post-match assault from Cesaro and The Miz. The following week, R-Truth teamed with Rey Mysterio and Sin Cara to defeat Cesaro and The Prime Time Players, with R-Truth pinning Cesaro for the win. R-Truth faced Cesaro for the United States Championship on November 18 at Survivor Series, but was unsuccessful in winning the title. On the following episode of SmackDown, R-Truth defeated Cesaro in a non-title match. On the December 3 episode of Raw, R-Truth was again unsuccessful in capturing the United States Championship from Cesaro in fatal-four-way match, also involving Kofi Kingston and Wade Barrett. On December 16 at TLC: Tables, Ladders & Chairs, R-Truth failed again to capture the United States Championship from Cesaro and sustained an injury. He returned on the February 18, 2013 episode of Raw, saving Kofi Kingston from Damien Sandow. At Battleground, R-Truth unsuccessfully challenged Curtis Axel for the Intercontinental Championship.

==== Various alliances and feuds (2013–2016) ====
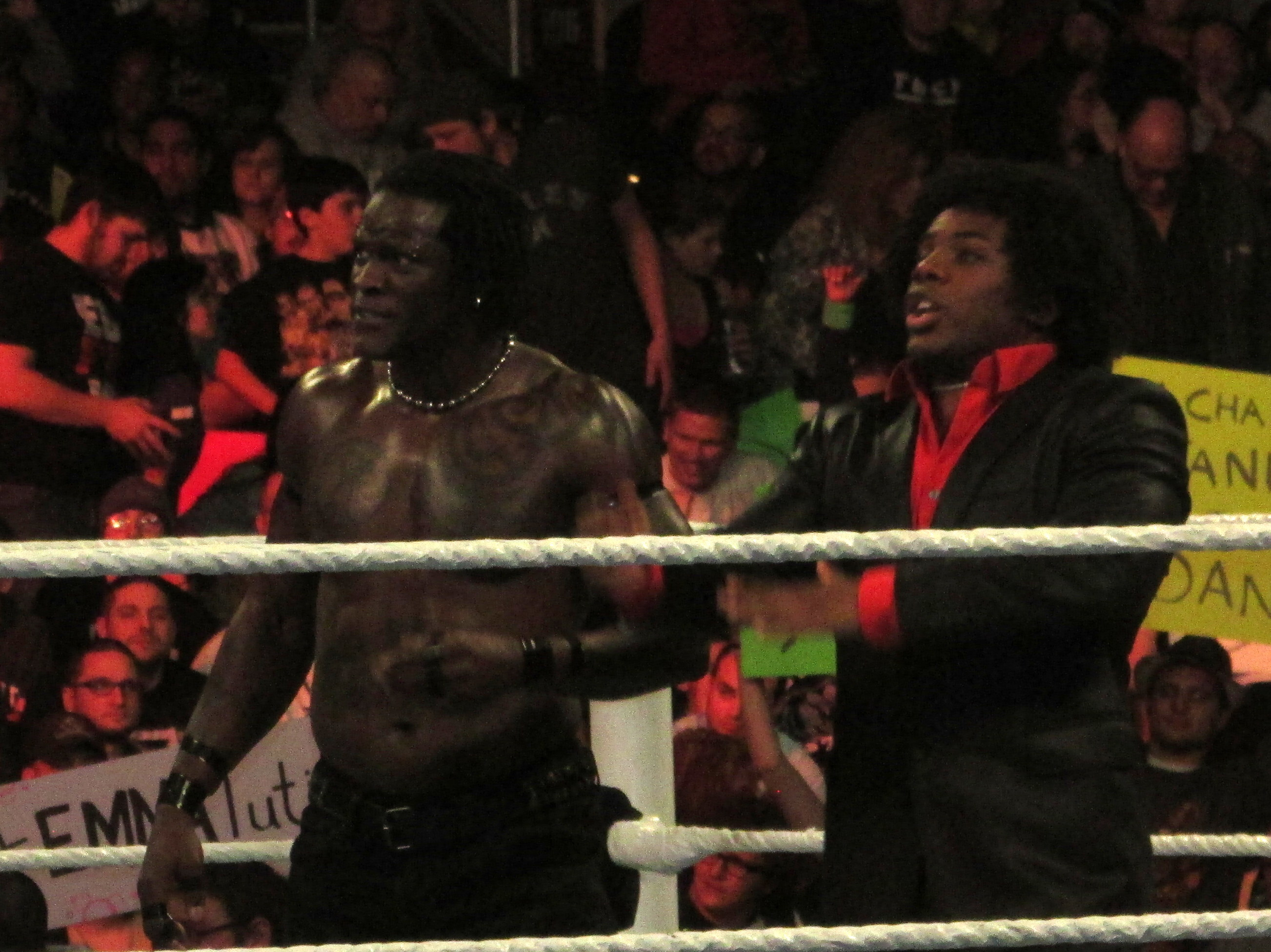
R-Truth (left) and Xavier Woods in January 2014

On the November 18 episode of Raw, R-Truth teamed with Xavier Woods, who he had teamed previously with in TNA, to defeat 3MB (Drew McIntyre and Jinder Mahal), who were for that night called The Rhinestone Cowboys. On the November 29 episode of SmackDown, R-Truth and Woods began a feud with Brodus Clay after Clay took offense to Woods using his entrance music and The Funkadactyls as his managers earlier in the week on Raw. On the December 2 episode of Raw, R-Truth and Woods defeated Tons of Funk (Clay and Tensai) in a rematch after Woods pinned Clay. At TLC: Tables, Ladders & Chairs, R-Truth defeated Clay after Clay was distracted by Tensai leaving after having enough of Clay's behavior. At Extreme Rules on May 4, 2014, R-Truth and Woods were defeated by Alexander Rusev in a 2-on-1 handicap match. After that loss, R-Truth and Woods' team quietly disbanded.

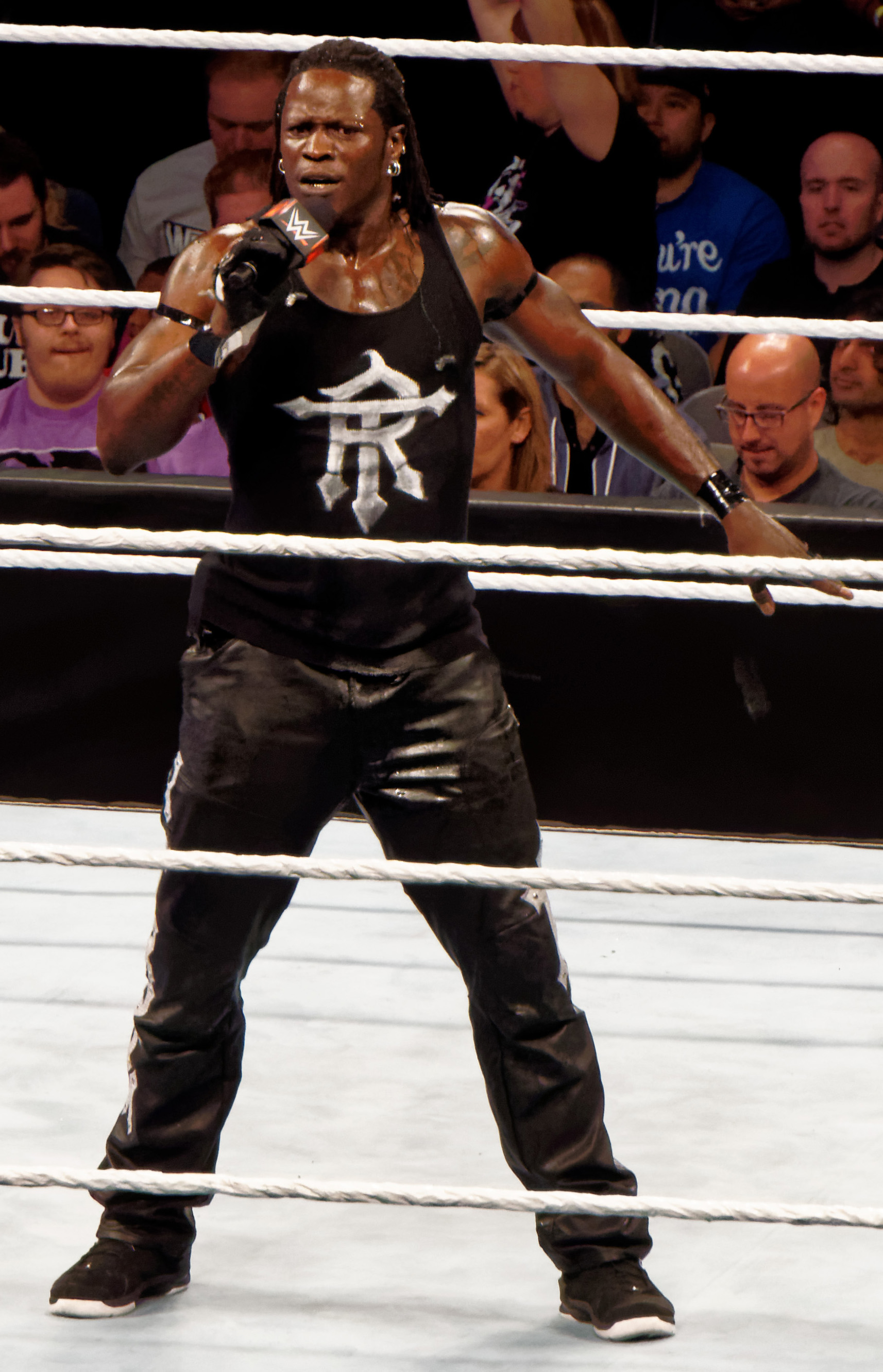
R-Truth in March 2015

At Royal Rumble on January 25, 2015, R-Truth entered the Royal Rumble match at number 2, but was eliminated by Bubba Ray Dudley. At Fastlane, Dean Ambrose stole Bad News Barrett's Intercontinental Championship belt. Over the next few weeks, various wrestlers gained possession of the belt including R-Truth, Dolph Ziggler, Daniel Bryan, Luke Harper and Stardust. Subsequently, a multiple-man ladder match for the title involving these wrestlers was scheduled for WrestleMania 31. At the event, R-Truth was unsuccessful in winning the championship. On the April 27 episode of Raw, R-Truth took part in the 2015 King of the Ring tournament, defeating Stardust in the first round. The following night on the WWE Network, R-Truth lost to Bad News Barrett in the semi-finals. R-Truth defeated Stardust at Payback pre-show. R-Truth participated in the Elimination Chamber match for the vacant Intercontinental Championship, but was eliminated by Ryback, who later won the match. During the match, R-Truth eliminated King Barrett, starting a feud between the two. In the following weeks, R-Truth mocked Barrett, wearing his royal crown and cape while referring to himself as "King What's Up". At the Money in the Bank pre-show, R-Truth defeated Barrett. At the Battleground pre-show, R-Truth faced Barrett in a "Battle for the Crown" match, where if Barrett lost, R-Truth would receive Barrett's crown, R-Truth failed to win the match, which ended their feud.

==== The Golden Truth (2016–2017) ====
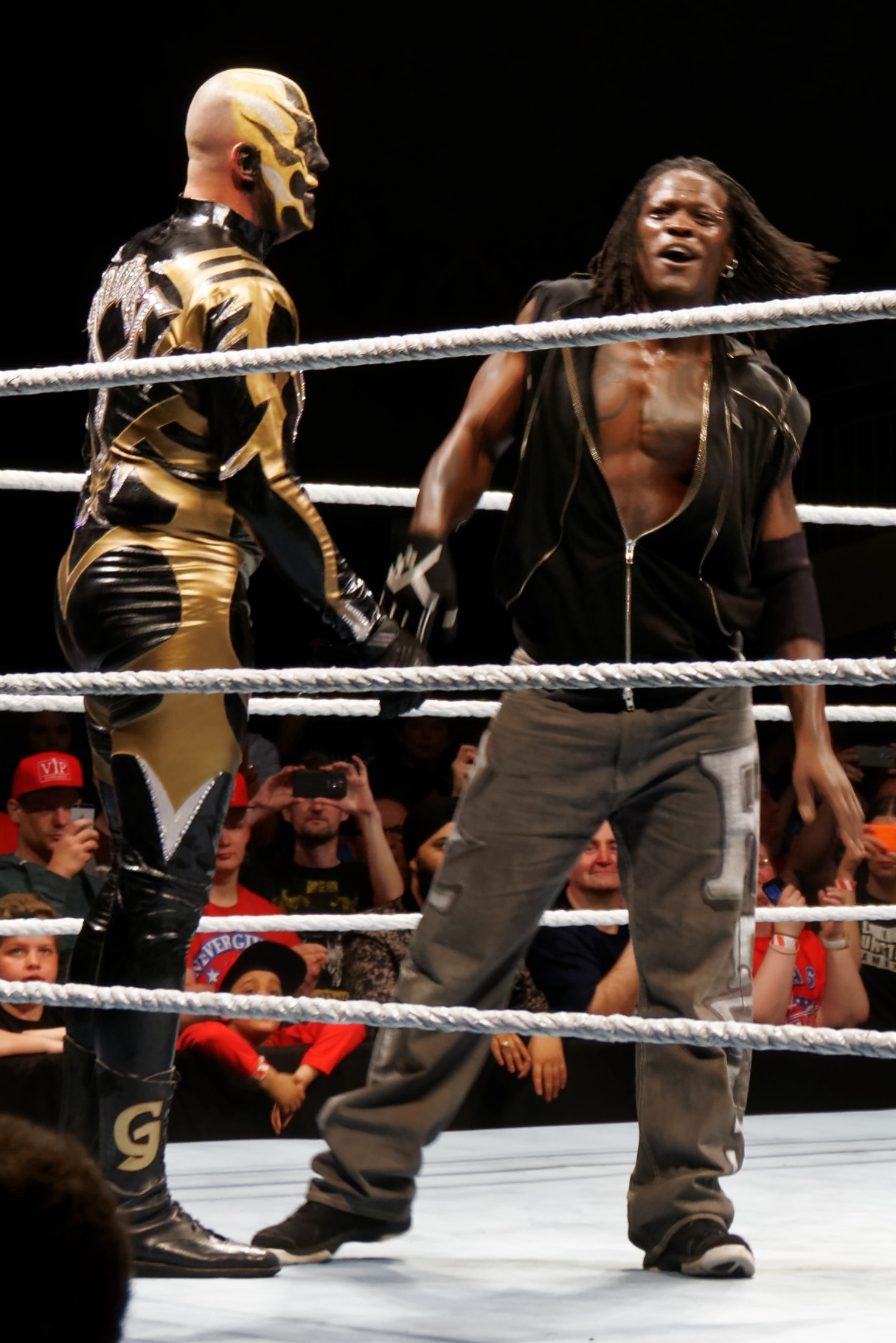
The Golden Truth in April 2016

At the 2016 Royal Rumble match, R-Truth brought a ladder into the ring and climbing it, incorrectly believing the match to be the Money in the Bank ladder match. (This was part of a character trend where he was at least one PPV behind on everything.) Upon realizing his error, R-Truth was eliminated by Kane. In the following weeks on Raw and SmackDown, Goldust approached R-Truth and proposed they form a tag team to no avail. At the Fastlane pay-per-view, Goldust came down to aid R-Truth at ringside in his match against Curtis Axel, inadvertently distracting R-Truth before Axel rolled him up for the win. After multiple attempts from Goldust, ending with R-Truth denying his request, R-Truth began to apologize and attempt to form a tag team with Goldust, with Goldust denying R-Truth. At WrestleMania 32, R-Truth entered André the Giant Memorial Battle Royal but was eliminated by Adam Rose and Heath Slater. For a number one contender's tag team title tournament, on the April 13 episode of SmackDown, he was scheduled to team with Goldust for the match but was replaced by Fandango due to a refusal to team with R-Truth by Goldust. A week later, R-Truth aligned himself with Tyler Breeze due to Goldust's alliance with Fandango. On the May 2 episode of Raw, Breeze defeated Goldust after interference by R-Truth. A week later on Raw, R-Truth defeated Fandango, with Breeze in R-Truth's corner. On the May 12 episode of SmackDown R-Truth and Breeze faced Goldust and Fandango. During the match, R-Truth and Goldust refused to fight each other. As a result, Breeze and Fandango attacked Goldust as Fandango allowed Breeze to pin Goldust for the win. R-Truth attempted to rescue Goldust from the attack, only to get beaten down by the two along with him. The next week on Raw, R-Truth and Goldust debuted as The Golden Truth against Breezango (Tyler Breeze and Fandango) in a losing effort after R-Truth unintentionally kicked Goldust. Afterwards, Golden Truth started a losing streak, losing to the likes of Breezango and The Dudley Boyz. Golden Truth earned their first victory after defeating Breezango at the Money in the Bank event on June 19. On July 19, as part of the 2016 WWE draft, R-Truth, along with Goldust, was drafted to Raw brand. In November, The Golden Truth joined team Raw, but lost their spots a week later when R-Truth sold their spot to The Shining Stars for tickets to Puerto Rico. On the November 7 episode of Raw, The Shining Stars defeated The Golden Truth to join Team Raw. On April 2, 2017, R-Truth and Goldust competed in the André the Giant Memorial Battle Royal, but failed to win.

On the May 15 episode of Raw, during a promo, Goldust attacked R-Truth, ending The Golden Truth. On the June 26 episode of Raw, R-Truth and Goldust had a brawl before their match even started. R-Truth was defeated by Goldust in a singles match on the July 10 episode of Raw. On the August 28 episode of Raw, R-Truth competed in an Intercontinental Championship number one contender's Battle Royal, which was won by Jeff Hardy. In October, reports suggested R-Truth suffered an arm injury during a match against Elias at a live event. R-Truth reportedly underwent surgery on October 26.

==== Alliance with Carmella (2018–2019) ====
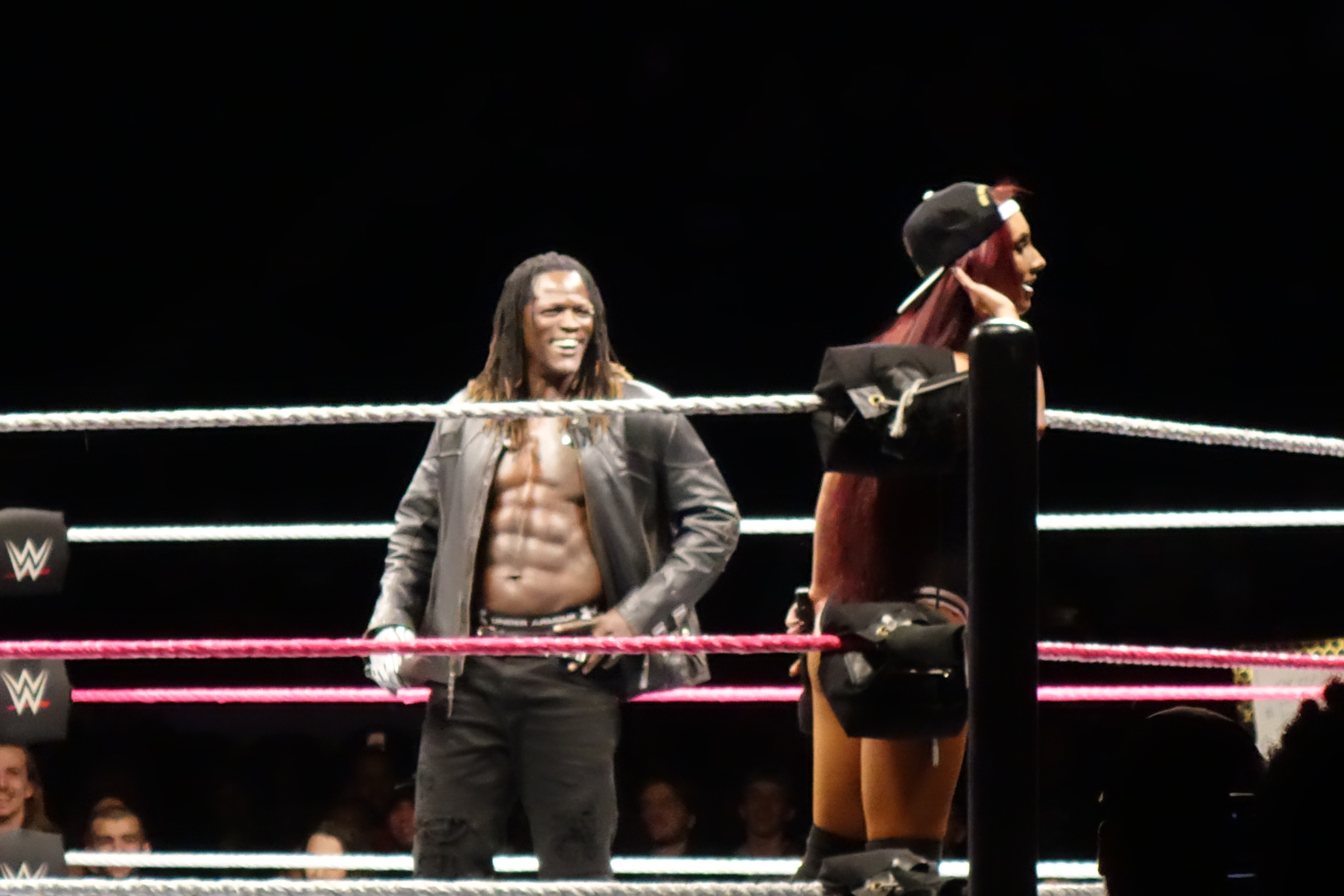
In September 2018, R-Truth (back) established a partnership with Carmella (front).

On April 17, 2018, R-Truth was moved to SmackDown brand as part of the Superstar Shake-up. During the summer, R-Truth involved himself in angles with then SmackDown Women's Champion Carmella, claiming that he would have got a chance against United States Champion Shinsuke Nakamura by pinning Carmella (since Becky Lynch and Charlotte Flair had both got a chance against Carmella's title by defeating her in non–title matches); R-Truth was eventually granted a match against Nakamura, but lost. On the September 4 episode of SmackDown Live, Carmella finally agreed to manage R-Truth in his match against The Miz to avoid his wife Maryse's interference. R-Truth eventually won the match thanks to a distraction from Miz and Maryse's enemies Daniel Bryan and Brie Bella, which was also his first televised singles win since May 2016. Shortly after, Carmella started managing R-Truth and the two participated in season two of Mixed Match Challenge. Despite losing three matches before defeating Rusev and Lana to qualify into the playoffs, R-Truth and Carmella went on to defeat Jeff Hardy and Charlotte Flair in the quarter–finals and The Miz and Asuka in the semi–finals. In the finals of the Mixed Match Challenge, that took place on December 16 at TLC: Tables, Ladders & Chairs, R-Truth and Carmella defeated Jinder Mahal and Alicia Fox, earning both the number 30 spots for their respective Royal Rumble matches at the Royal Rumble. On the January 8, 2019 episode of SmackDown, R-Truth faced WWE Champion Daniel Bryan in a non-title match in a losing effort.

At the Royal Rumble pay-per-view, R-Truth was attacked by Nia Jax during his entrance, who subsequently took his spot in the Men's Royal Rumble. As compensation for being attacked at the Royal Rumble, R-Truth received a United States Championship match on SmackDown, in which he defeated champion Shinsuke Nakamura with a surprise roll-up to capture his second United States Championship, in his first championship win since April 2012. Immediately after the match, R-Truth was challenged by previous champion Rusev but retained the title with another roll-up. After the match, R-Truth was attacked by Nakamura and Rusev. On the February 26 episode of SmackDown, R-Truth issued an open challenge for his United States Championship, which was answered by Andrade and Rey Mysterio. He retained the title in a triple threat match. The following week, another open challenge was answered by Mysterio, Andrade, and Samoa Joe. In the ensuing fatal-four-way match, R-Truth lost the title to Joe, ending his reign at 35 days. In a rematch between the same four men at Fastlane, Joe retained the title.

==== Multi-time 24/7 Champion (2019–2022) ====
On the May 20 episode of Raw, WWE Hall of Famer Mick Foley unveiled the new WWE 24/7 Championship, a title similar to the Hardcore Championship, which also uses the "24/7 rule". Later that night, Truth pinned previous champion Robert Roode in the arena's parking lot to win the title and become the first superstar to win both the Hardcore Championship and 24/7 Championship. The following weeks led to both Truth and Carmella regularly appearing on both Raw and SmackDown Live as part of the 24/7 rule and at more unconventional times and locations (filmed and published on WWE social media), where they would try to flee from other wrestlers wanting to win the title. This led R-Truth to lose the title to multiple superstars such as Heath Slater, Cedric Alexander, Mike Kanellis, Shelton Benjamin, The Revival (Dash Wilder and Scott Dawson), twice to Jinder Mahal, three times each to Akira Tozawa, Drake Maverick, EC3, Elias, seven times to Mojo Rawley, and usually regain it hours or even minutes later.

Truth went on to become a 53-time 24/7 Champion, and became the first of only twelve people to stay as champion for over 24 hours. Within the first month of its existence, the 24/7 Championship segments would become the highest viewed videos of both Raw and SmackDown online, garnering millions of views each. Also, R-Truth was voted by WWE fans as their favorite champion in June 2019. Over the course of the next year, he won the title 52 times, also including to sports presenter Rob Stone, NBA player Enes Kanter, and race car driver Kyle Busch. As part of the 2019 draft, Truth was drafted to Raw, splitting him from Carmella, who remained on SmackDown. On February 27, 2020, at Super ShowDown, Truth competed in the gauntlet match for the Tuwaiq Trophy, where he defeated Bobby Lashley, Andrade, and Erick Rowan, but lost to AJ Styles following an assault from Rowan. At Money in the Bank, he was quickly defeated by Lashley. Throughout 2021 and 2022, R-Truth continued to be present in segments for the 24/7 Championship until November 7, 2022, when the 24/7 Championship title was retired. As WWE 24/7 Champion, Truth had the most reigns at 53 and the longest combined reign at 425 days.

In the later part of 2022, R-Truth made several guest appearances on episodes of NXT. On the November 1 episode of NXT, he suffered an injury in a match against Grayson Waller, which was expected to leave him out of action for "a long time".

==== Various storylines (2023–present) ====
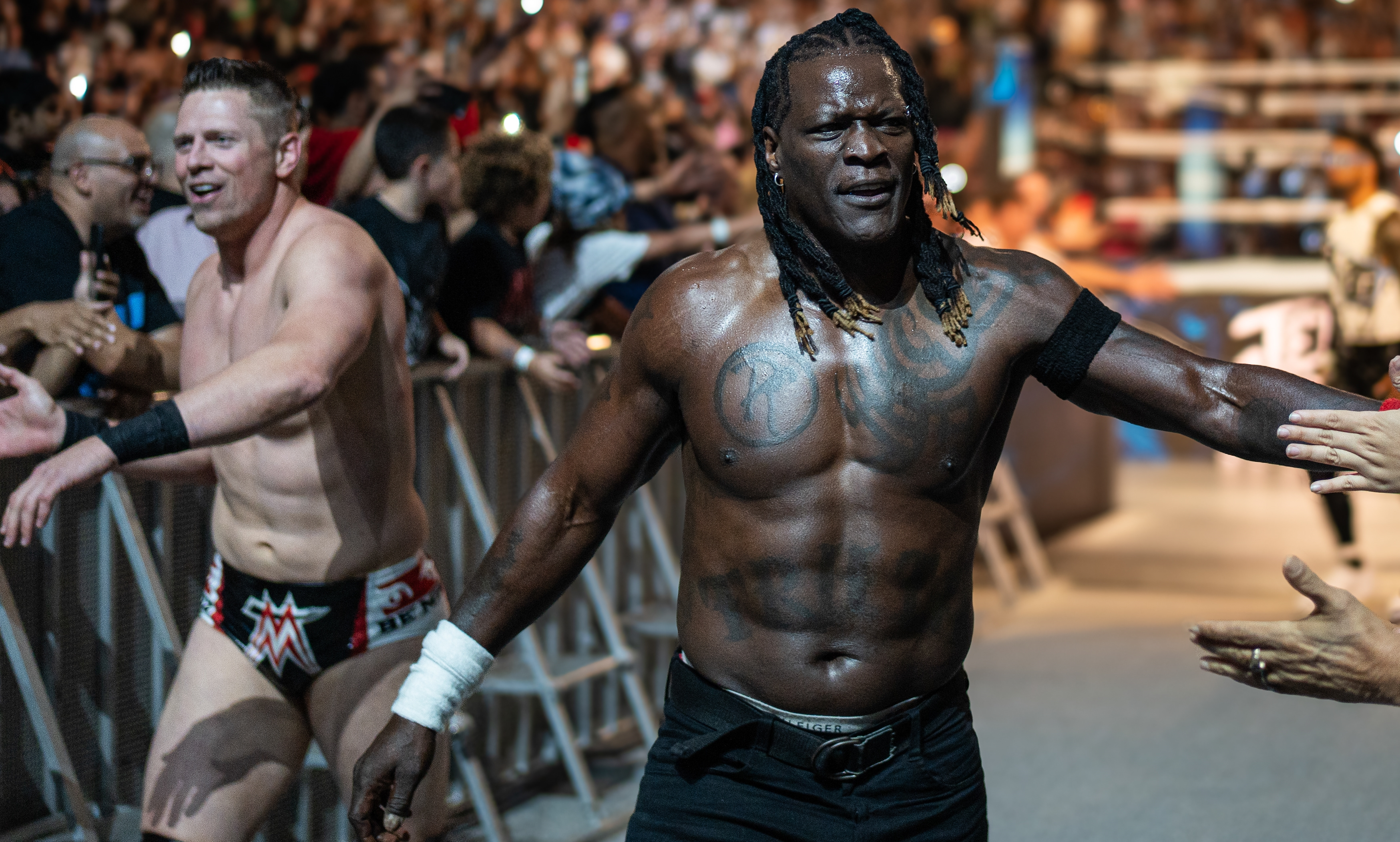
Awesome Truth reunited in 2024.

After a year of absence due to injury, Truth returned at Survivor Series: WarGames on November 25, 2023, in a backstage segment with Alpha Academy and Pretty Deadly. Truth started a storyline with The Judgment Day (Damian Priest, Rhea Ripley, Finn Bálor, "Dirty" Dominik Mysterio, and JD McDonagh) in which Truth thought himself to be a member of the stable, but this ended when the group attacked Truth in the ring on the December 11 episode of Raw. On the December 18 episode of Raw, Truth defeated McDonagh in a Loser Leaves Judgment Day Miracle on 34th Street Fight, but McDonagh was still considered a member of The Judgment Day. During the storyline, Truth joined Miz, reviving the Awesome Truth tag team.

On Night 1 of WrestleMania XL on April 6, Truth climbed the ladder and retrieved the Raw Tag Team Championship to win the titles, giving Truth his first WrestleMania win. On the April 15 episode of Raw, the Raw Tag Team Championship was renamed to the World Tag Team Championship and the team were presented new championship belts from chief content officer Triple H and Raw General Manager Adam Pearce. They held the titles for 79 days until they lost them against The Judgment Day (Bálor and McDonagh), and the team disbanded on the September 30 episode of Raw, after Miz attacked Truth.

On February 14, 2025, episode of SmackDown, Truth was drafted to the SmackDown brand and had his first singles match on the brand since 2019, losing to Carmelo Hayes. As part of his comedy gimmick, Truth referred to John Cena as his "childhood hero" (despite being 5 years older than Cena). After Cena's heel turn, Truth feuded with him, at the Backlash press conference, when Cena attacked Truth with an Attitude Adjustment through a table. This later led to a match between the two at Saturday Night's Main Event XXXIX, where Truth was defeated by Cena. On June 1, Truth announced that he had been released by WWE but it was later revealed that Truth's contract would not be renewed upon its expiration rather than him being released. On June 7 at Money in the Bank, Truth assisted Cody Rhodes and Jey Uso — helping them defeat Cena and Logan Paul. After the event, Truth adopted a more serious attitude and referred to himself by his real name "Ron Killings", but still retained his former ring name. On the June 20 episode of SmackDown, Truth faced Cena which ended in a disqualification after Cena struck him with the WWE Championship. After the match, his serious character was dropped and he returned to his comedy gimmick.

On the March 20, 2026 episode of SmackDown, Truth and Damian Priest defeated The MFTs to win the WWE Tag Team Championship. On the August 14 episode of SmackDown, Truth and Priest lost the titles back to The MFTs also involving The War Raiders ending their reign at 147 days. After failing to win the AAA World Tag Team Championship from the War Raiders on the September 11 episode of SmackDown, Truth was attacked by Priest, ending their partnership.

== Personal life ==
Killings has been married to his wife, Pamela, since April 7, 2011. Their daughter was born on November 15, 2014. From a previous relationship, he also has four children. His son Christopher plays college basketball in the Penn State Athletic Conference for Wilkes-Barre and had previously played for Greater Allegheny.

Killings is a supporter of the Carolina Panthers. His father, Aaron, died on November 8, 2026.

== Music career ==
Before becoming a wrestler, Killings began his music career in the 1990s as a hip-hop artist, pursuing a big break in the industry before his wrestling career took off. During this time, he attended Jack the Rapper conventions—gatherings of record executives and musical artists where performers could audition for record deals. At one of these events, Killings met and was photographed with Tupac Shakur and Eazy E, a moment that inspired him to continue pursuing music. However, he went on hiatus from making music when he began his wrestling career in 1997. Some of his other musical influences include Eminem, T.I., Lil Wayne, and he also takes inspiration from rock groups like Pearl Jam.

In 2003 while working for TNA Killings made a comeback to music releasing his first studio album Invinceable. He has since released 3 more albums Killingit in 2016 and Legacy in 2021.

Killings switched from his usual hip-hop sound, when he released his first country album The White Album on August 7, 2025, the record blends rap, soul and pop elements. When asked about the album's name Killings stated in an interview “As dark as I am, I called it the White Album.” The album debuted at #10 on the Billboard Country Chart marking his first ever chart placement.

Killings also plays sporadic concerts throughout the year.

== Filmography ==
Year	Title	Role	Notes
2003	Head of State	Ron "The Truth" Killings	
2008	The Wrestler	Ron "The Truth" Killings	
2016	Break Dance Revolution	DJ R. Killings	
2018	Blood Brother	Blaine	

=== Video game appearances ===
Year	Title	Note
2002	WWF Raw	
2010	WWE Smackdown vs Raw 2011	
2011	WWE All Stars	
2011	WWE 12	
2012	WWE Wrestlefest	Mobile game
2012	WWE 13	
2013	WWE 2K14	
2014	WWE SuperCard	Mobile game
2014	WWE 2K15	
2015	WWE 2K16	
2016	WWE 2K17	
2017	WWE 2K18	
2018	WWE 2K19	
2019	WWE 2K20	
2020	WWE 2K Battlegrounds	
2022	WWE 2K22	
2023	WWE 2K23	
2024	WWE 2K24	
2025	WWE 2K25	
2026	WWE 2K26	

== Discography ==
=== Studio albums ===
List of studio albums, with selected details
Title	Album details	US Country
Invinceable	Released: 2003; Label: K-Krush Enterprises; Formats: CD	
Killingit	Released: April 1, 2016; Label: Independent; Formats: Digital download	
Legacy	Released: December 10, 2021; Label: Independent; Formats: Digital Download	
The White Album	Released: August 12, 2025; Label: Independent; Formats: Digital Download	10

=== Singles ===
List of singles, showing year released and album name
Title	Year	Album
"What' Cha Do to Get It" (featuring Black Pearl, JA and Big D)	2015	Killingit
"Pump It Up" (featuring Black Pearl and Iya Champs)	2015	Killingit
"Rep My City" (featuring Chop Blade)	2015	Killingit
"Me Myself and I"	2015	Killingit
"I Be Like"	2016	Non-album singles
"Back Against the Wall" (featuring Laroo RTK)	2017	Non-album singles
"That'z Endurance" (featuring Mannish Mania)	2018	Non-album singles
"Dance Break" (featuring J-Trx)	2019	Non-album singles
"Run It" (featuring Leah Van Dale and J-Trx)	2019	Non-album singles
"Set It Off"	2020	Non-album singles
"Hit Em Up"	2020	Non-album singles
"We Got All the Power"	2020	Non-album singles
"Legacy"	2021	Legacy
"Out the Window"	2021	Legacy
"Betta Ask Somebody" (featuring Naomi Nicole)	2022	Non-album singles
"Barnyard Flexin"	2022	Non-album singles
"What It Is"	2022	Non-album singles
"Better Play"	2023	Non-album singles
"Be Right Back"	2023	Non-album singles
"Making the Cut"	2023	Non-album singles
"Thank You"	2024	Non-album singles
"You Know It" (featuring Fabo)	2024	Non-album singles
"Holiday Feel"	2024	Non-album singles
"For Real"	2025	Non-album singles
"When It All Adds Up"	2025	The White Album
"Count My Sins"	2025	The White Album
"Moments Made 4 U"	2025	The White Album

== Championships and accomplishments ==
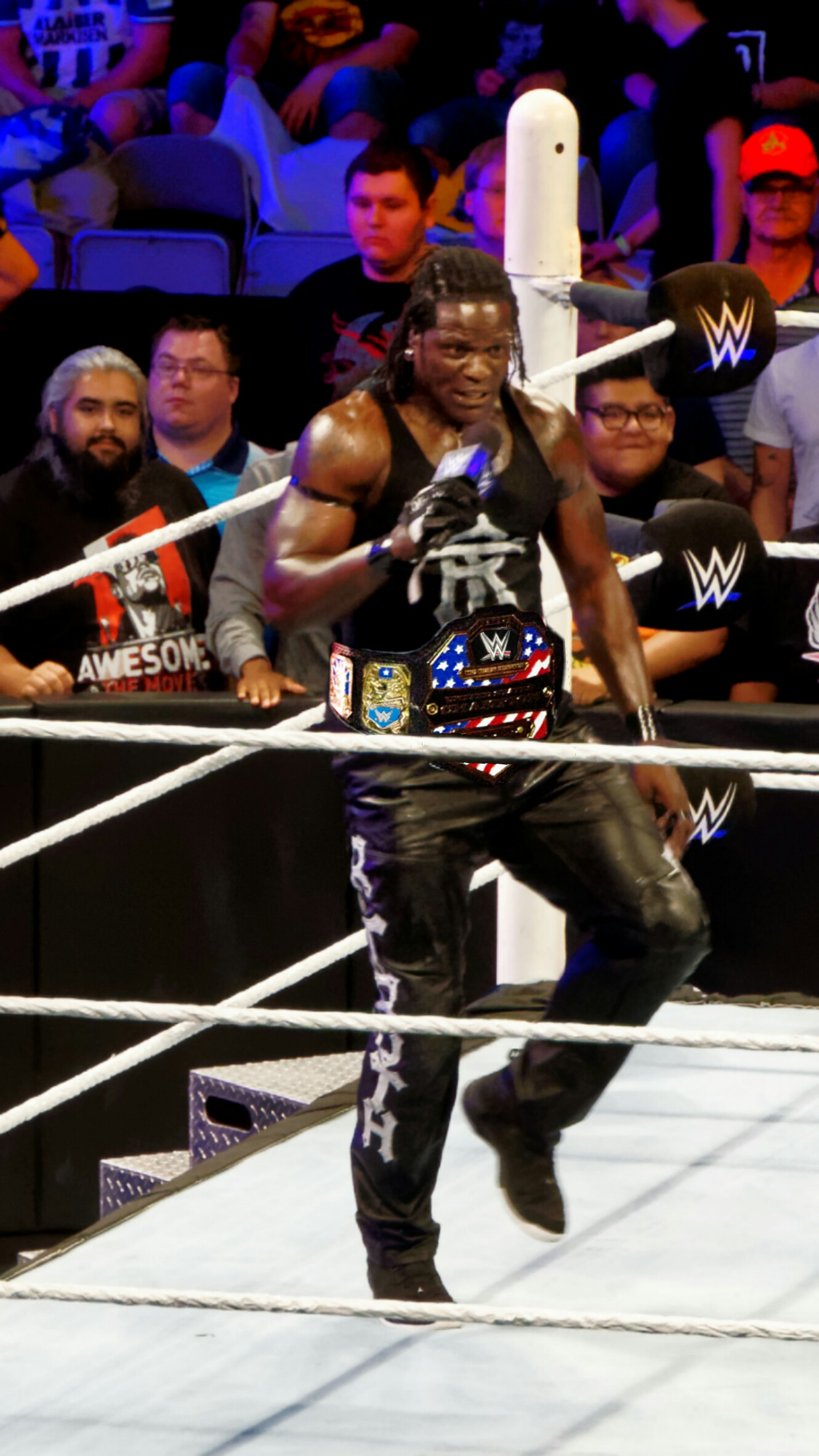
R-Truth is a two-time United States Champion

- CyberSpace Wrestling Federation
  - CSWF Heavyweight Championship (1 time)
- Memphis Championship Wrestling
  - MCW Southern Heavyweight Championship (2 times)
- National Championship Wrestling
  - NCW Television Championship (1 time)
- NWA: Total Nonstop Action / Total Nonstop Action Wrestling
  - NWA World Heavyweight Championship (2 times)
  - NWA World Tag Team Championship (2 times) – with B. G. James and Konnan (Note: Killings defended the championship with either James or Konnan under the Freebird Rule.)
  - TNA World Tag Team Championship (1 time) – with Adam Jones
  - Gauntlet for the Gold (2003 – Tag Team) – B.G. James
- NWA Wildside
  - NWA Wildside Television Championship (1 time)
- Pro Wrestling Illustrated
  - Tag Team of the Year (2012) with Kofi Kingston
  - Ranked No. 18 of the top 500 wrestlers in the PWI 500 in 2004
- World Wrestling Federation / Entertainment / WWE
  - WWE United States Championship (2 times)
  - World Tag Team Championship (Note: The title was known as the WWE Tag Team Championship during his first reign. He won it a second time when it was called the Raw Tag Team Championship. It was renamed to the World Tag Team Championship during this second reign.) (2 times) – with Kofi Kingston (1), and The Miz (1)
  - WWE Tag Team Championship (1 time) – with Damian Priest
  - WWF Hardcore Championship (2 times)
  - WWE 24/7 Championship (54 times)
  - Bragging Rights Trophy (2009) – with Team SmackDown (Chris Jericho, Kane, Matt Hardy, Finlay, David Hart Smith and Tyson Kidd)
  - Mixed Match Challenge (Season 2) – with Carmella
  - Slammy Award (2 times)
    - Best Musical Performance (2008)
    - LOL Moment of the Year (2015)
- Wrestling Observer Newsletter
  - Worst Worked Match of the Year (2006) Reverse Battle Royal on Impact!
