= Elimination Chamber (2011) =

World Wrestling Entertainment pay-per-view event

- Promotional poster featuring Edge and the Elimination Chamber structure at No Way Out 2009, holding the World Heavyweight Championship
- Promotion: World Wrestling Entertainment
- Brand(s): Raw; SmackDown
- Date: February 20, 2011
- City: Oakland, California
- Venue: Oracle Arena
- Attendance: 11,500
- Buy rate: 212,000

Pay-per-view chronology
← Previous; Royal Rumble	Next → WrestleMania XXVII

Elimination Chamber chronology
← Previous; 2010	Next → 2012

The 2011 Elimination Chamber (known as No Escape in Germany) was a professional wrestling pay-per-view (PPV) event produced by World Wrestling Entertainment (WWE). It was the second annual Elimination Chamber event and took place on February 20, 2011, at the Oracle Arena in Oakland, California, held for wrestlers from the promotion's Raw and SmackDown brand divisions. The event centered on the men's Elimination Chamber match, a type of roofed steel cage that surrounds the ring and ringside area with no disqualifications; the objective is to eliminate all other opponents either by pinfall or submission with championship implications at stake.

Two Elimination Chamber matches were contested at the event, one for each brand. In the main event, which was Raw's Elimination Chamber match, John Cena defeated CM Punk, John Morrison, R-Truth, Randy Orton, and Sheamus to become the number one contender for the WWE Championship at WrestleMania XXVII. In SmackDown's Elimination Chamber match, Edge retained the World Heavyweight Championship against Big Show, Drew McIntyre, Kane, Rey Mysterio, and Wade Barrett. On the undercard, The Corre (Justin Gabriel and Heath Slater) defeated Santino Marella and Vladimir Kozlov to win the WWE Tag Team Championship, and The Miz retained the WWE Championship against Jerry Lawler.

The event received 212,000 pay-per-view buys, lower than the 287,000 buys that the previous year's event received. This was the last Elimination Chamber event held under the first brand extension, which ended in August, but was reinstated in July 2016.

== Production ==
=== Background ===
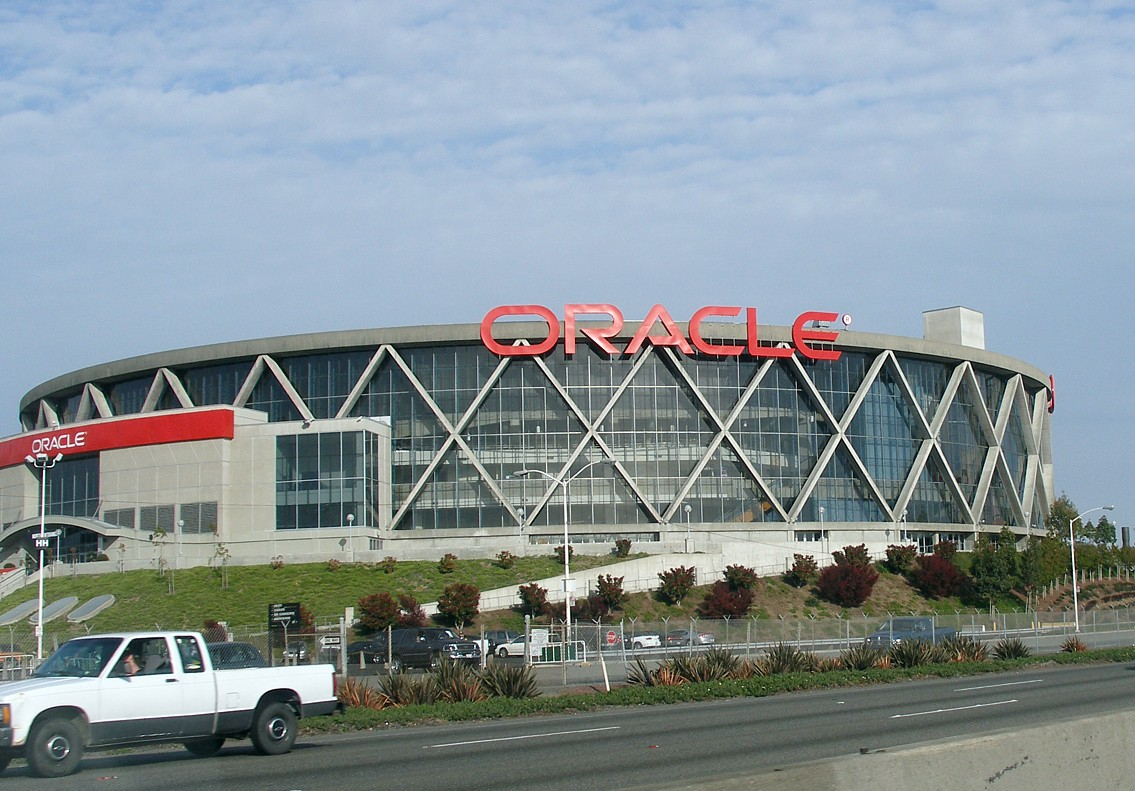
The second annual Elimination Chamber event was held at the Oracle Arena in Oakland, California.

In 2010, World Wrestling Entertainment (WWE) held a professional wrestling pay-per-view (PPV) event titled Elimination Chamber, which replaced the previously annual February PPV, No Way Out. The concept of the event was that the two main event matches were contested inside the Elimination Chamber, with Raw's WWE Championship and SmackDown's World Heavyweight Championship, respectively, at stake in each. The following year, WWE scheduled a second event to be held on February 20, 2011, at the Oracle Arena in Oakland, California, thus establishing Elimination Chamber as the new annual February PPV. It featured wrestlers from the Raw and SmackDown brand divisions.

The Elimination Chamber match is an elimination-based match contested in a type of large roofed steel cage that surrounds the wrestling ring with an elevated platform around the ring. Within the Chamber are four inner pods, one behind each ring post. The match is contested by six participants. Two wrestlers start the match, while the other four are held within each inner pod with one selected randomly to enter the match at regular intervals, which continues until all four have been released. The objective is to eliminate all other opponents by pinfall or submission, and there are no disqualifications or count-outs.

The Elimination Chamber name was chosen by a fan poll to replace the established No Way Out event, however, the inaugural show was still promoted as "No Way Out" in Germany as it was feared that the name "Elimination Chamber" may remind people of the gas chambers used during the Holocaust. For 2011, it was renamed to "No Escape" for the German broadcast.

=== Storylines ===
The professional wrestling matches at Elimination Chamber featured professional wrestlers performing as characters in scripted events pre-determined by the hosting promotion, WWE. Storylines between the characters were produced on WWE's weekly television shows Raw and SmackDown of the Raw and SmackDown brands—storyline divisions in which WWE assigned its employees to different programs.

After The Miz won the WWE Championship in November 2010, Raw commentator Jerry Lawler was given what was billed as his first WWE Championship match, after criticizing Miz's win by using his Money in the Bank briefcase while former champion Randy Orton was injured. He lost to Miz in a TLC match after his fellow commentator Michael Cole stopped Lawler from climbing the ladder. On the January 31 episode of Raw, the Raw general manager announced a Raw Rumble match, to determine the WWE Championship contender at Elimination Chamber, while the losing participants would be entered into an Elimination Chamber match to determine who will face the WWE Champion at WrestleMania XXVII. The participants were CM Punk, Randy Orton, King Sheamus, John Morrison, John Cena, Jerry Lawler, and R-Truth. Lawler last eliminated Sheamus to win the battle royal to earn himself the title match, while the other six contestants went on to participate in the Raw Elimination Chamber match.

At the Royal Rumble, Alberto Del Rio won the eponymous match to earn himself a World Championship match at WrestleMania. He subsequently announced he would wrestle for the World Heavyweight Championship, held at the time by Edge. Edge was then embroiled in a feud with Dolph Ziggler and his on-screen ex-wife Vickie Guerrero, who was also scripted to be dating Ziggler. The week before the Elimination Chamber, Edge and Kelly Kelly defeated Ziggler and LayCool, causing Guerrero to fire Kelly Kelly. At the pay-per-view, Kelly Kelly was rehired by Teddy Long and attacked Vickie, but was stopped by Laycool, who in turn was stopped by Trish Stratus. On the final episode of SmackDown before the pay-per-view, acting general manager Guerrero stripped Edge of the championship and awarded it to Ziggler, only for Theodore Long, the real general manager, to give Edge a return match which he won. After this, Long fictitiously Kayfabe fired Ziggler leaving an open spot in the Elimination Chamber match (which was subsequently filled by Big Show). The other participants were Kane, Rey Mysterio, Wade Barrett and Drew McIntyre. After that event, Edge and Kelly Kelly defeated Drew McIntyre and Vickie Guerrero thus making Theodore Long fire Vickie Guerrero as the official consultant of SmackDown.

== Event ==
Other on-screen personnel
Role:	Name:
English commentators	Michael Cole
English commentators	Josh Mathews
English commentators	Booker T
Spanish commentators	Carlos Cabrera
Spanish commentators	Hugo Savinovich
Interviewers	Matt Striker
Interviewers	Todd Grisham
Ring announcers	Justin Roberts
Ring announcers	Tony Chimel
Referees	Mike Chioda
Referees	John Cone
Referees	Scott Armstrong
Referees	Justin King
Referees	Chad Patton

=== Preliminary matches ===
The event opened with Alberto Del Rio facing Kofi Kingston. Del Rio forced Kingston to submit to the Cross Armbreaker to win the match.

Next was the Elimination Chamber match for the World Heavyweight Championship involving Edge, Rey Mysterio, Kane, Drew McIntyre, Wade Barrett, and Big Show (who replaced Dolph Ziggler). Edge and Mysterio started the match. Barrett entered at #3, Kane entered at #4, McIntyre entered at #5 and Big Show entered at #6. Barrett was eliminated by Big Show after a KO Punch. Big Show and McIntyre were both eliminated by Kane after a Chokeslam each to both men. Kane was eliminated by Edge after a double Spear to him and Mysterio, which made Kane angry, thus kicking Edge to the floor and executed two Chokeslams: one to Mysterio and one to Edge. Edge executed a Spear on Mysterio for a near-fall. Mysterio executed a 619 and a Slingshot Splash on Edge for a near-fall. Mysterio executed another 619 and leapt off the top rope but Edge performed a Spear on Mysterio in mid-air to eliminate him and retain the title. After the match, Alberto Del Rio attacked Edge but Christian returned and rescued Edge from Del Rio, ending the attack with a Killswitch.

Next, Booker T came to the ring and introduced a returning Trish Stratus who was going to be joining him and "Stone Cold" Steve Austin as a trainer for the new season of Tough Enough.

After that, Santino Marella and Vladimir Kozlov defended the WWE Tag Team Championship against The Corre (Heath Slater and Justin Gabriel). Gabriel performed a 450 Splash on Kozlov to win the titles.

Next Vickie Guerrero came out to beg Theodore Long to rehire Dolph Ziggler, Long announced he had rehired someone and brought out a returning Kelly Kelly who had recently been fired by Guerrero. As she attacked Guerrero she was attacked by LayCool before Trish Stratus came out to make the save.

In the fourth match, The Miz faced Jerry Lawler for the WWE Championship. During the match, Lawler performed a Diving Fist Drop on The Miz but The Miz placed his foot on the bottom rope to void the pinfall. The Miz performed a Skull Crushing Finale on Lawler to retain the title.

=== Main event ===
The main event was an Elimination Chamber match for a WWE Championship match at WrestleMania XXVII between CM Punk, Randy Orton, King Sheamus, John Morrison, John Cena, and R-Truth. King Sheamus and Morrison started the match while the other four men were locked inside pods. Orton entered at #3 and Punk entered at #4 but Punk's pod would not open, allowing Orton to attack Punk. Punk was eliminated by Orton after an RKO but the Anonymous Raw General Manager announced that Punk would re-enter the match. Cena entered at #4 and R-Truth entered at #5. R-Truth was eliminated by King Sheamus after a Brogue Kick. Punk entered at #6 and eliminated Orton after a GTS. King Sheamus was eliminated by Morrison after a Crossbody from the top of the chamber. Morrison was eliminated by Punk after a GTS. Cena eliminated Punk after an Attitude Adjustment onto the chamber floor to win a WWE Championship match at WrestleMania XXVII.

== Aftermath ==
=== Raw ===
After becoming #1 Contender to the WWE Championship, John Cena faced The Miz for the title at WrestleMania XXVII. The match ended in a double countout but The Rock used his power as WrestleMania host to restart the match under no disqualifications and no count-outs. The Miz defeated Cena to retain the WWE Championship after The Rock hit Cena with a Rock Bottom. This would lead both Cena and The Rock to challenge each other to a match at WrestleMania XXVIII, which The Rock won.

=== SmackDown ===
After Elimination Chamber, Edge and Kelly Kelly teamed up to take on Drew McIntyre and Vickie Guerrero for her job as Smackdown Consultant on the line. They defeated Drew McIntyre and Vickie Guerrero thus per stipulation, Theodore Long fired Vickie Guerrero as the Official Consultant of Smackdown. Then, it led to Alberto Del Rio attacking Edge after Edge taunting Vickie being fired. Later, Edge defeated Drew McIntyre the next night. Then, Edge defended the World Heavyweight Championship against Alberto Del Rio at WrestleMania XXVII where Edge retained. On the April 11 episode of Raw, Edge retired from professional wrestling due to a legit neck injury and relinquished the World Heavyweight Championship on the April 15 episode of SmackDown, thus retiring as World Heavyweight Champion. Edge's best friend Christian would go on to win the vacant title against Del Rio in a ladder match at Extreme Rules. That reign would only last two days, as on May 3, during the taping for the May 6 episode of SmackDown, Christian lost the title to Randy Orton.

=== Future ===
The 2011 event would be the final Elimination Chamber held during the first brand split, which ended in August. However, the brand split was reinstated in July 2016, and the 2017 event was held exclusively for SmackDown. Additionally, in April, the promotion ceased using its full name with the "WWE" abbreviation becoming an orphaned initialism.

== Results ==
No.	Results	Stipulations	Times
1^{D}	Daniel Bryan (c) defeated Ted DiBiase by submission	Singles match for the WWE United States Championship	5:42
2	Alberto Del Rio (with Ricardo Rodriguez) defeated Kofi Kingston by submission	Singles match	10:30
3	Edge (c) defeated Rey Mysterio, Kane, Drew McIntyre, Big Show, and Wade Barrett	Elimination Chamber match for the World Heavyweight Championship	31:30
4	The Corre (Heath Slater and Justin Gabriel) (with Ezekiel Jackson) defeated Santino Marella and Vladimir Kozlov (c) (with Tamina Snuka) by pinfall	Tag team match for the WWE Tag Team Championship	5:08
5	The Miz (c) (with Alex Riley) defeated Jerry Lawler by pinfall	Singles match for the WWE Championship	12:10
6	John Cena defeated CM Punk, John Morrison, King Sheamus, Randy Orton, and R-Truth	Elimination Chamber match for a WWE Championship match at WrestleMania XXVII	33:12
(c) / – the champion(s) heading into the match; D / – this was a dark match

=== Elimination Chamber entrances and eliminations (SmackDown) ===
Eliminated	Wrestler	Entered	Eliminated by	Method	Time
1	Wade Barrett	3	Big Show	Pinfall	18:48
2	Big Show	6	Kane	Pinfall	20:54
3	Drew McIntyre	5	Kane	Pinfall	21:09
4	Kane	4	Edge	Pinfall	22:50
5	Rey Mysterio	2	Edge	Pinfall	31:30
Winner	Edge (c)	1			31:30

=== Elimination Chamber entrances and eliminations (Raw) ===
Eliminated	Wrestler	Entered	Eliminated by	Method	Time
1	R-Truth	5	King Sheamus	Pinfall	17:31
2	Randy Orton	3	CM Punk	Pinfall	21:33
3	King Sheamus	2	John Morrison	Pinfall	25:16
4	John Morrison	1	CM Punk	Pinfall	32:50
5	CM Punk	6	John Cena	Pinfall	33:12
Winner	John Cena	4			33:12
