= Elimination Chamber (2018) =

WWE pay-per-view and livestreaming event

- Promotional poster featuring the participants of each Elimination Chamber match.
- Promotion: WWE
- Brand: Raw
- Date: February 25, 2018
- City: Paradise, Nevada
- Venue: T-Mobile Arena
- Attendance: 15,126

WWE event chronology
← Previous; Royal Rumble	Next → Fastlane

Elimination Chamber chronology
← Previous; 2017	Next → 2019

The 2018 Elimination Chamber (known as No Escape in Germany) was a professional wrestling pay-per-view (PPV) and livestreaming event produced by WWE, held exclusively for wrestlers from the promotion's main roster brand, Raw. It was the eighth Elimination Chamber event and took place on February 25, 2018, at the T-Mobile Arena in the Las Vegas suburb of Paradise, Nevada. The event centered on the Elimination Chamber match, a type of roofed steel cage that surrounds the ring and ringside area with no disqualifications; the objective is to eliminate all other opponents either by pinfall or submission with championship implications at stake.

Six matches were contested at the event, including one on the Kickoff pre-show. There were two Elimination Chamber matches on the card, both of which were firsts, as one was the first-ever seven-man variant, which started with three wrestlers instead of two, while the other was the first-ever women's version. In the main event, Roman Reigns won the seven-man Elimination Chamber match to become the number one contender against Brock Lesnar for the Universal Championship at WrestleMania 34, while on the undercard, Alexa Bliss won the women's Elimination Chamber match to retain the Raw Women's Championship. Also on the card, Asuka defeated Nia Jax to extend her undefeated streak and prevent Jax from being added to her WrestleMania championship match. The event was also notable for Ronda Rousey signing her Raw contract, where she had a confrontation with WWE Chief Operating Officer Triple H and Raw Commissioner Stephanie McMahon, which was the former's first appearance since the night after Survivor Series in November 2017.

This was the final brand-exclusive Elimination Chamber event as brand-exclusive PPV and livestreaming events for the main roster were discontinued following WrestleMania 34 in April. This in turn made it the final Raw-exclusive PPV and livestreaming event as well as the first to not feature any cruiserweight division matches.

== Production ==
=== Background ===
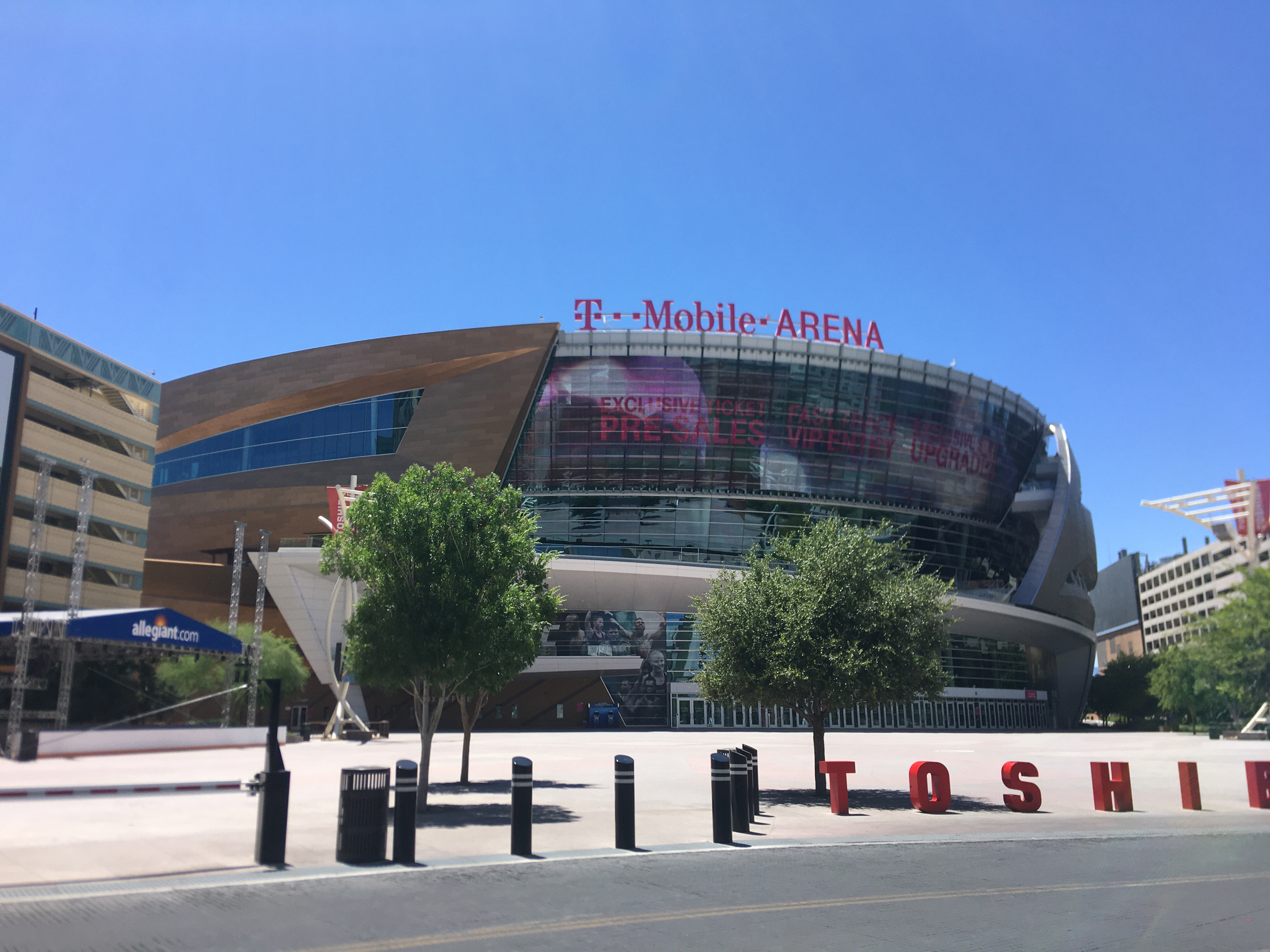
The eighth Elimination Chamber event was held at the T-Mobile Arena in the Las Vegas suburb of Paradise, Nevada.

Elimination Chamber is a professional wrestling event first produced by WWE in 2010. It has been held every year since, except in 2016, generally in February. It was originally broadcast exclusively via pay-per-view (PPV) before it began simultaneously livestreaming on the WWE Network in 2015. The concept of the event is that one or two main event matches are contested inside the Elimination Chamber, either with championships or future opportunities at championships at stake. Announced on December 6, 2017, the eighth Elimination Chamber event was scheduled to take place on February 25, 2018, at the T-Mobile Arena in the Las Vegas suburb of Paradise, Nevada. While the 2017 event was SmackDown-exclusive, the 2018 event was held exclusively for the Raw brand division. Tickets went on sale on December 15, 2017.

The Elimination Chamber match is an elimination-based match contested in a type of large roofed steel cage that surrounds the wrestling ring with an elevated platform around the ring. Within the Chamber are four inner pods, one behind each ring post. The match is contested by six participants. Two wrestlers start the match, while the other four are held within each inner pod with one selected randomly to enter the match at regular intervals, which continues until all four have been released. The objective is to eliminate all other opponents by pinfall or submission, and there are no disqualifications or count-outs. The first-ever seven-man match was scheduled for the 2018 event with the only difference in the rules being that three wrestlers start the match instead of two.

In 2011 and since 2013, the show has been promoted as "No Escape" in Germany as it was feared that the name "Elimination Chamber" may remind people of the gas chambers used during the Holocaust; it was promoted as "No Way Out" in 2010 and 2012.

=== Storylines ===
The event comprised six matches, including one on the Kickoff pre-show, that resulted from scripted storylines. Results were predetermined by WWE's writers on the Raw brand, while storylines were produced on WWE's weekly television show, Monday Night Raw.

At the Royal Rumble, Shinsuke Nakamura won the men's Royal Rumble match and decided to stay on SmackDown to challenge for the WWE Championship at WrestleMania 34. This left Brock Lesnar, who retained his Universal Championship in a triple threat match against Braun Strowman and Kane at the same event, without an opponent at WrestleMania. In response, Raw General Manager Kurt Angle scheduled an Elimination Chamber match to determine the number one contender for the Universal Championship at WrestleMania. Six qualification matches were scheduled. The first three were contested on the January 29 episode of Raw. In the first, Strowman defeated Kane in a Last Man Standing match to qualify. Elias then qualified by defeating "Woken" Matt Hardy after a distraction from Bray Wyatt, and free agent John Cena defeated Finn Bálor to qualify. The following week, Elias defeated Cena and Strowman in a triple threat match to determine who would enter the chamber last. That same episode, Roman Reigns and Intercontinental Champion The Miz qualified by defeating Wyatt and Apollo Crews (whose ring name was later shortened to Apollo), respectively. On the next episode, Cena defeated The Miz in a match where the loser would be one of the starting participants in the chamber match. Later, the final qualification match took place in what was originally a second chance fatal four-way match between Bálor, Wyatt, Hardy, and Apollo. However, Angle added Seth Rollins, thus making it a fatal five-way. Rollins and Bálor both simultaneously pinned Wyatt, and it was decided that both would be a part of the Elimination Chamber match, marking the first seven-man chamber match. The following week, all seven men participated in a gauntlet match that began with Reigns and Rollins. Reigns was eliminated followed by Cena. Elias then eliminated Rollins, but was in turn eliminated by Bálor, who was eliminated by The Miz. Strowman won the gauntlet match by pinning The Miz in what was the longest match in WWE history, lasting nearly two hours.

On the January 29 episode of Raw, Commissioner Stephanie McMahon convinced Asuka, who won the inaugural women's Royal Rumble match the previous night at the Royal Rumble, to wait until after Elimination Chamber to pick which championship to challenge for at WrestleMania 34, as Raw Women's Champion Alexa Bliss was scheduled to defend her title in the first-ever women's Elimination Chamber match. The following week, General Manager Kurt Angle announced that Bayley, Mandy Rose, Mickie James, Sasha Banks, and Sonya Deville would be the other competitors in the match. Bliss came out and questioned Angle as to why she had to defend her title in the Elimination Chamber match while Universal Champion Brock Lesnar did not and accused Angle of sexism. Angle retorted that Lesnar retained his title at the Royal Rumble, but Bliss had not defended her title since TLC: Tables, Ladders & Chairs in October. Bliss made the point that she was not the one who schedules matches. Angle then took an audience vote if Bliss should defend the title, and the audience agreed that she should.

On the January 15 episode of Raw, Asuka defeated Nia Jax after the referee stopped the match, who deemed Jax unable to continue. Both then competed in the inaugural women's Royal Rumble match at the Royal Rumble, which Asuka won for the right to challenge for either the Raw Women's Championship or SmackDown Women's Championship at WrestleMania 34. On the February 5 episode of Raw, General Manager Kurt Angle announced that Jax would face Asuka at Elimination Chamber and if she were to defeat Asuka, Jax would be added to Asuka's championship match at WrestleMania to make it a triple threat match.

Following Asuka's Royal Rumble match victory at the Royal Rumble, former Ultimate Fighting Championship (UFC) star Ronda Rousey made an appearance and interrupted Asuka, Raw Women's Champion Alexa Bliss, and SmackDown Women's Champion Charlotte Flair. Rousey's appearance confirmed that she had signed full-time with WWE. On the February 12 episode of Raw, it was announced that Rousey would sign her Raw contract at Elimination Chamber.

After losing a feud to Elias, Matt Hardy was defeated by Bray Wyatt on the November 27, 2017, episode of Raw. Following the match, Hardy had a mental breakdown where he sat in the corner and repeatedly shouted "delete" with an arm gesture. This would be the genesis of Hardy's transition into "Woken" Matt Hardy (WWE's version of his "Broken" gimmick from Total Nonstop Action Wrestling) where he debuted as the character the following week, interrupting a promo by Wyatt. Over the following month, the two went back and forth in promos as well as a couple of in-ring confrontations until they finally had a match on Raw 25 on January 22, 2018, in which Wyatt defeated Hardy once again. The two then faced off in the Royal Rumble match, where they eliminated each other. On the February 19 episode of Raw, another match between the two was scheduled for Elimination Chamber.

Prior to the Royal Rumble, Titus Worldwide (Apollo and Titus O'Neil) gained two consecutive wins over number one contenders Cesaro and Sheamus. At the Royal Rumble, Cesaro and Sheamus eventually won the Raw Tag Team Championship to become record four-time champions as a team, and a record fifth reign for Cesaro individually. Titus Worldwide received a title opportunity on Raw immediately following the Royal Rumble, but were unsuccessful, and Cesaro and Sheamus also retained their title that same episode. On the February 19 episode of Raw, Titus Worldwide defeated Cesaro and Sheamus in a non-title match. Afterwards, they challenged Cesaro and Sheamus for the Raw Tag Team Championship at Elimination Chamber for being 3–1 over the champions, which was made official on February 23.

On February 23, Bálor Club members Luke Gallows and Karl Anderson were scheduled to face The Miztourage (Bo Dallas and Curtis Axel) on the Elimination Chamber Kickoff pre-show.

== Event ==
Other on-screen personnel
Role:	Name:
English commentators	Michael Cole
English commentators	Corey Graves
English commentators	Jonathan Coachman
Spanish commentators	Carlos Cabrera
Spanish commentators	Marcelo Rodríguez
German commentators	Carsten Schaefer
German commentators	Tim Haber
German commentators	Calvin Knie
Chinese commentators	Meng Ai
Chinese commentators	Sean Deng
Japanese commentators	Shun Yamaguchi
Japanese commentators	Funaki
Ring announcer	JoJo
Referees	Jason Ayers
Referees	Shawn Bennett
Referees	John Cone
Referees	Dan Engler
Referees	Chad Patton
Interviewers	Renee Young
Interviewers	Charly Caruso
Interviewers	Mike Rome
Pre-show panel	Renee Young
Pre-show panel	Booker T
Pre-show panel	Peter Rosenberg
Pre-show panel	David Otunga
Raw Talk panel	Renee Young
Raw Talk panel	Peter Rosenberg

=== Pre-show ===
During the Elimination Chamber Kickoff pre-show, Luke Gallows and Karl Anderson of the Bálor Club faced The Miztourage (Bo Dallas and Curtis Axel). In the climax, Gallows and Anderson performed the "Magic Killer" on Axel to win the match.

=== Preliminary matches ===
The actual pay-per-view opened with the first-ever women's Elimination Chamber match in which Alexa Bliss defended the Raw Women's Championship against Bayley, Sonya Deville, Sasha Banks, Mandy Rose, and Mickie James. Bayley and Deville were the first two contestants. Rose entered next, assisting Deville in attacking Bayley. Banks entered third and immediately attacked both Deville and Rose. Rose was eliminated by Banks after submitting to the "Bank Statement". James then entered and eliminated Deville after a diving seated senton off a pod. Following this, Bayley performed a "Bayley-to-Belly" on James to eliminate her. Defending champion Bliss entered last and was hesitant to enter so Bliss climbed the pod instead; Banks was able to knock her down on top of a pod. Banks then turned her attention to Bayley and Bayley subsequently gave Banks a "Bayley to Belly". Bliss eliminated Bayley with a roll-up. Bliss then performed "Twisted Bliss" off a pod on Banks, who applied the Banks Statement on Bliss and got her inside the ring while still applying the hold, but Bliss escaped and sent Banks into the turnbuckles. However, Banks booted Bliss to the ground. In the climax, as Banks was heading to the top of a pod, Bliss shoved her into it and followed up with a spike DDT on Banks to retain the title. After the match, an elated Bliss said that nobody thought that she would remain champion and that she proved why she is the ultimate goddess of the Women's Division.

Next, Cesaro and Sheamus defended the Raw Tag Team Championship against Titus Worldwide (Apollo and Titus O'Neil). In the end, Cesaro and Sheamus performed a "White Noise"/diving neckbreaker combination on Apollo to retain the titles.

After that, Asuka faced Nia Jax where if Jax won, she would be added to Asuka's championship match at WrestleMania 34. After dominating most of the match, Jax attempted a powerbomb, but Asuka countered into a roll up for the win, keeping Jax out of her WrestleMania championship match. After the match, Jax tackled Asuka through the barricade. Bliss was later interviewed and looked pleased with what transpired between Asuka and Jax. Bliss then mocked Asuka by declaring that no one is ready for her.

In the fourth match, "Woken" Matt Hardy fought Bray Wyatt. Hardy performed a "Twist of Fate" on Wyatt to win the match.

Next was the Raw contract signing of Ronda Rousey. General Manager Kurt Angle, Commissioner Stephanie McMahon, and WWE's Chief Operating Officer Triple H bragged about Rousey before introducing her. However, before Rousey signed her contract, Triple H confirmed that there were no special stipulations in Rousey's contract, but she would compete in a match at WrestleMania 34. Angle then brought up the incident from WrestleMania 31 where Rousey and The Rock embarrassed Stephanie and Triple H, and said that Triple H and Stephanie were now glad that they owned Rousey so they could manipulate her. Triple H and Stephanie tried to calm the situation, however, Angle instigated the tension more, which resulted in Rousey throwing Triple H through a table. Stephanie then slapped Rousey, but retreated before Rousey could attack her. Rousey then signed her contract.

=== Main event ===
The main event was the first-ever seven-man Elimination Chamber match with the winner becoming the number one contender against Brock Lesnar for the Universal Championship at WrestleMania 34. Due to the extra participant, three men began the match instead of two, which were The Miz, Seth Rollins, and Finn Bálor. John Cena entered the match as the fourth entrant, followed by Roman Reigns and Braun Strowman. Strowman dominated the field and sent The Miz off the top of the pod onto the other wrestlers. Strowman performed a running powerslam on The Miz to eliminate him. The last man to enter the match was Elias. Cena performed an Attitude Adjustment and Reigns performed a Spear on Strowman for a nearfall. Elias attempted to lift Strowman up on his shoulders, but Strowman blocked and performed a running powerslam on Elias to eliminate him. Cena attempted a top-rope crossbody on Strowman, who caught him and performed a running powerslam on Cena to eliminate him. Strowman then eliminated Bálor and Rollins by performing the same finisher on each of them. The final two were Strowman and Reigns. In the climax, Reigns performed three superman punches and two spears on Strowman to win the match and earn the right to challenge Brock Lesnar for the Universal Championship at WrestleMania 34. After the match, Strowman attacked Reigns with two running powerslams and sent Reigns through a pod.

== Aftermath ==
Universal Champion Brock Lesnar and his advocate Paul Heyman were advertised to be on the following night's episode of Raw to confront the winner of the Elimination Chamber match, but no-showed. Roman Reigns cut a promo on his WrestleMania 34 opponent, calling Lesnar entitled and that he hid behind his contract, which allowed him to show up whenever he wanted. He said Lesnar did not respect WWE and that he had no respect for Lesnar, but he would defeat Lesnar at WrestleMania and become the Universal Champion.

Raw Women's Champion Alexa Bliss, along with Mickie James, gloated about retaining her title in the first-ever women's Elimination Chamber match. She said at WrestleMania 34, if Asuka chose her, she would end her undefeated streak. Asuka then came out, but Nia Jax was close behind and the three women teamed up on Asuka until Bayley and Sasha Banks came out for the save, with James turning heel in the process. Asuka, Banks, and Bayley then teamed up to face Bliss, James, and Jax in a six-woman tag team match. During the match, Banks went to tag Bayley, but Bayley refused the tag. Asuka won the match for her team by making James submit. Asuka and Jax had a rematch the following week where Asuka was again victorious. Asuka then decided that she would challenge Charlotte Flair for the SmackDown Women's Championship at WrestleMania. Jax would then be granted a Raw Women's Championship match at WrestleMania after Bliss revealed her true feelings about Jax.

Ronda Rousey, General Manager Kurt Angle, Commissioner Stephanie McMahon, and Chief Operating Officer Triple H had a segment to apologize for what happened at Elimination Chamber. During the segment, Angle, in an attempt to keep his job, said that he lied about Triple H and Stephanie's supposed plan against Rousey. Stephanie thanked Angle for clearing the air, however, Rousey said everything was addressed except for Stephanie slapping her in the face. Rousey wanted an apology from Stephanie, who complied and said she only did it because Rousey put her husband through a table. As Stephanie and Triple H were leaving, Triple H punched Angle. The following week, Stephanie confirmed that Rousey could choose any member of the active Raw roster as her WrestleMania 34 opponent except the champion; Rousey chose Stephanie. Angle reminded Stephanie that although she was an executive, she had a contract to compete as a wrestler. Angle also reminded Triple H of his warning from Survivor Series where if Triple H were to attack him again, he would retaliate. He also reminded Triple H that he too had a contract to compete as a wrestler and then scheduled Triple H and Stephanie to face himself and Rousey at WrestleMania.

Intercontinental Champion The Miz said that he should be in the main event of WrestleMania 34 and said that he had made the Intercontinental Championship more important than the Universal Championship. He was told by General Manager Kurt Angle that his opponent that night might determine his WrestleMania opponent. Seth Rollins then came out and defeated The Miz in a match. Finn Bálor then came out to also have a match with Miz, which confused Rollins. The Miztourage attacked Bálor right after the match started, causing a disqualification, and Luke Gallows and Karl Anderson came to Bálor's aid. Angle appeared on the TitanTron and banned The Miztourage and Gallows and Anderson from ringside and restarted the match, stating that there would be a winner or else Miz would not have a match at WrestleMania. Bálor then defeated Miz. The following week, Angle scheduled Miz to defend the title in a triple threat match against Rollins and Bálor at WrestleMania.

Bray Wyatt was scheduled to have a match with Heath Slater, but the match did not happen as he attacked Slater and his tag team partner Rhyno before the match could begin. Afterwards, he said his war with "Woken" Matt Hardy was not over. The following week, after defeating Rhyno, Wyatt called out Hardy, who appeared on the TitanTron and challenged Wyatt to an "Ultimate Deletion" match at the Hardy Compound (WWE's version of Total Nonstop Action Wrestling's "Final Deletion" match, a Falls-Count-Anywhere Hardcore match fought at Hardy's house). Wyatt accepted the challenge. The "Ultimate Deletion" match aired on the March 19 episode where Hardy defeated Wyatt by pinfall, then Wyatt disappeared after being thrown into the "Lake of Reincarnation".

Titus Worldwide (Apollo and Titus O'Neil) had a rematch against Cesaro and Sheamus for the Raw Tag Team Championship in a two out of three falls match where Cesaro and Sheamus again retained.

Despite being the third competitor on the receiving end of a pinfall loss to Braun Strowman in the Elimination Chamber match, John Cena still wanted a match at WrestleMania 34 and challenged The Undertaker. However, he revealed that he was told that the match was impossible. He then said that he would use his free agent status to go to SmackDown the following night to earn a match at WrestleMania. On SmackDown, Cena was given the opportunity to be added to the WWE Championship match at SmackDown's pay-per-view Fastlane if he could defeat WWE Champion AJ Styles in a non-title match. Cena defeated Styles, making the WWE Championship match at Fastlane a six-pack challenge (the other participants were Baron Corbin, Kevin Owens, Dolph Ziggler, and Sami Zayn).

The 2018 Elimination Chamber was the final to be brand-exclusive, and subsequently the final Raw-exclusive PPV and livestreaming event of the second brand split, as following WrestleMania 34 in April, WWE discontinued these types of brand-exclusive events for the main roster.

== Results ==
No.	Results	Stipulations	Times
1^{P}	Luke Gallows and Karl Anderson defeated The Miztourage (Bo Dallas and Curtis Axel) by pinfall	Tag team match	8:50
2	Alexa Bliss (c) defeated Sasha Banks, Bayley, Mickie James, Sonya Deville, and Mandy Rose	Elimination Chamber match for the WWE Raw Women's Championship	29:35
3	Cesaro and Sheamus (c) defeated Titus Worldwide (Apollo and Titus O'Neil) (with Dana Brooke) by pinfall	Tag team match for the WWE Raw Tag Team Championship	10:05
4	Asuka defeated Nia Jax by pinfall	Singles match Had Jax won, she would have been added to Asuka's championship match at WrestleMania 34, regardless of which title Asuka chose.	8:15
5	Matt Hardy defeated Bray Wyatt by pinfall	Singles match	9:55
6	Roman Reigns defeated Braun Strowman, Seth Rollins, Finn Bálor, John Cena, Elias, and The Miz	Elimination Chamber match for a WWE Universal Championship match at WrestleMania 34	40:15
(c) / – the champion(s) heading into the match; P / – the match was broadcast on the pre-show

=== Women's Elimination Chamber match ===
Eliminated	Wrestler	Entered	Eliminated by	Method	Times
1	Mandy Rose	3	Sasha Banks	Submission	13:50
2	Sonya Deville	2	Mickie James	Pinfall	17:35
3	Mickie James	5	Bayley	Pinfall	18:00
4	Bayley	1	Alexa Bliss	Pinfall	25:30
5	Sasha Banks	4	Alexa Bliss	Pinfall	29:35
Winner	Alexa Bliss (c)	6			29:35

=== Men's Elimination Chamber match ===
Eliminated	Wrestler	Entered	Eliminated by	Method	Times
1	The Miz	3	Braun Strowman	Running Powerslam	20:20
2	Elias	7	Braun Strowman	Running Powerslam	25:55
3	John Cena	4	Braun Strowman	Running Powerslam	26:25
4	Finn Bálor	1	Braun Strowman	Running Powerslam	30:45
5	Seth Rollins	2	Braun Strowman	Running Powerslam	36:40
6	Braun Strowman	6	Roman Reigns	Spear	40:15
Winner	Roman Reigns	5			40:15
