= Elimination Chamber (2012) =

WWE pay-per-view event

- Promotional poster featuring Sheamus with the Elimination Chamber Structure in the background
- Promotion: WWE
- Date: February 19, 2012
- City: Milwaukee, Wisconsin
- Venue: Bradley Center
- Attendance: 15,306
- Buy rate: 178,000

Pay-per-view chronology
← Previous; Royal Rumble	Next → WrestleMania XXVIII

Elimination Chamber chronology
← Previous; 2011	Next → 2013

The 2012 Elimination Chamber (known as No Way Out in Germany) was a professional wrestling pay-per-view (PPV) event produced by WWE. It was the third annual Elimination Chamber and took place on February 19, 2012, at the Bradley Center in Milwaukee, Wisconsin. The event centered on the men's Elimination Chamber match, a type of roofed steel cage that surrounds the ring and ringside area with no disqualifications; the objective is to eliminate all other opponents either by pinfall or submission with championship implications at stake.

Six matches were contested at the event, five of which were broadcast on the pay-per-view while the other was a dark match. In the main event, John Cena defeated Kane in an Ambulance match. There were two Elimination Chamber matches. In the first, which opened the show, CM Punk defeated The Miz, Chris Jericho, Kofi Kingston, Dolph Ziggler, and R-Truth to retain the WWE Championship, while in the second, Daniel Bryan defeated Santino Marella, Wade Barrett, Cody Rhodes, Big Show, and The Great Khali to retain the World Heavyweight Championship.

The event garnered 178,000 pay-per-view buys, down from 199,000 buys the previous year's event received.

== Production ==
=== Background ===
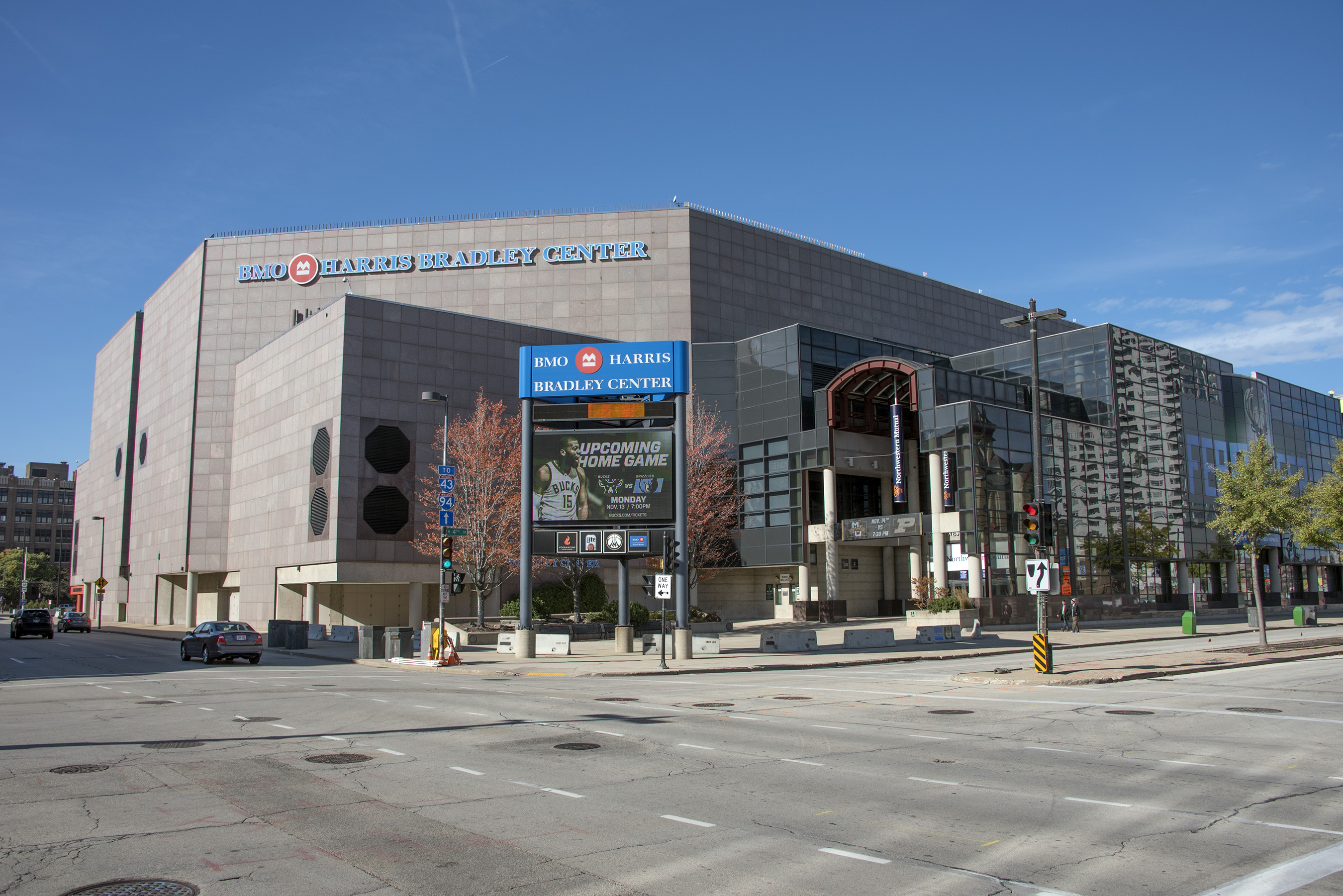
The third annual Elimination Chamber event was held at the Bradley Center in Milwaukee, Wisconsin.

Elimination Chamber is a professional wrestling pay-per-view (PPV) event produced every February by WWE since 2010. The concept of the event is that one or two main event matches are contested inside the Elimination Chamber, either with championships or future opportunities at championships at stake. The third Elimination Chamber event was scheduled to be held on February 19, 2012, at the Bradley Center in Milwaukee, Wisconsin. Tickets went on sale on December 17, 2011.

The Elimination Chamber match is an elimination-based match contested in a type of large roofed steel cage that surrounds the wrestling ring with an elevated platform around the ring. Within the Chamber are four inner pods, one behind each ring post. The match is contested by six participants. Two wrestlers start the match, while the other four are held within each inner pod with one selected randomly to enter the match at regular intervals, which continues until all four have been released. The objective is to eliminate all other opponents by pinfall or submission, and there are no disqualifications or count-outs.

This was the first Elimination Chamber event to be held following the end of the first brand extension in August 2011. It was also the first Elimination Chamber held to be promoted under the company's shortened trade name of WWE, as following WrestleMania XXVII in April 2011, the company ceased using its full name of World Wrestling Entertainment, although that remains the legal name of the company.

The previous year, the show was promoted as "No Escape" in Germany as it was feared that the name "Elimination Chamber" may remind people of the gas chambers used during the Holocaust. For the 2012 event, the show was promoted as "No Way Out" just as it was in 2010.

=== Storylines ===
Elimination Chamber featured professional wrestling matches that involved different wrestlers from pre-existing scripted feuds, plots, and storylines that were played out on Raw, SmackDown, and WWE Superstars—WWE's television programs.

The first match was announced by Interim Raw General Manager John Laurinaitis on January 30 on WWE's website featuring WWE Champion CM Punk defending his title against Dolph Ziggler, Chris Jericho, The Miz, R-Truth, and Kofi Kingston. The following week on Raw, Jericho won a Six-Pack Challenge featuring all six Elimination Chamber participants to earn the right to enter the match last.

On the February 3 episode of SmackDown, it was announced by SmackDown General Manager Theodore Long that there would also be an Elimination Chamber match for the World Heavyweight Championship originally featuring Daniel Bryan defending his title against Cody Rhodes, Wade Barrett, Big Show, Mark Henry and Randy Orton. The same night as the announcement, Henry would be removed from the match and suspended indefinitely by Long after he threatened him. In reality, Henry had hyperextended his knee the previous week. Later in the night, The Great Khali was announced as Henry's replacement. On the February 13 episode of Raw, Orton suffered a legitimate concussion during a match, which was blamed in storyline by Bryan hitting him in the head with the title. On the February 17 episode of SmackDown, a battle royal was held to determine Orton's replacement, which was won by Santino Marella, enabling him to enter the match.

John Cena and Kane began feuding in December 2011, with Kane targeting Cena due to his T-shirt slogan, "Rise Above Hate". To play psychological games with Cena, Kane began targeting Cena's friend Zack Ryder and his on-screen girlfriend, Eve Torres, attacking Ryder and cornering Eve in a variety of situations, all in an effort to make Cena "embrace the hate". On the February 6 episode of Raw, an ambulance match was announced for Elimination Chamber between Kane and Cena.

== Event ==
Other on-screen personnel
Role:	Name:
English Commentators	Michael Cole
English Commentators	Booker T
English Commentators	Jerry Lawler
Spanish Commentators	Carlos Cabrera
Spanish Commentators	Marcelo Rodriguez
Backstage interviewer	Josh Mathews
Ring announcer	Justin Roberts
Referees	Mike Chioda
Referees	John Cone
Referees	Scott Armstrong
Referees	Jack Doan

Before the event aired live on pay-per-view, Hunico defeated Alex Riley in a dark match.

=== Preliminary matches ===
The first match to air on pay-per-view was the Elimination Chamber match between reigning champion CM Punk, Dolph Ziggler, Chris Jericho, Kofi Kingston, R-Truth, and The Miz for the WWE Championship. Punk started off the match with Kingston. Punk sent Kingston into a pod and performed a Suplex on Kingston onto the chamber floor. Ziggler entered at #3, targeting Punk. R-Truth entered at #4, being eliminated by Punk after a diving elbow drop. Next was Miz followed by Jericho, who won the right to enter last after winning a Six-Pack Challenge on Raw. Jericho eliminated Ziggler after a Codebreaker and eliminated Kingston after forcing Kingston to submit to the Liontamer. Jericho was then knocked out after a roundhouse kick by Punk, leading to him falling out of the chamber (which had been opened to let Kingston out after he was eliminated) and accidentally landing on a camera man, knocking him out in the process and causing Jericho to be deemed unable to continue by the ringside trainers. Punk and Miz were the final two, after Punk kicked out of the Skull Crushing Finale, Punk performed a G.T.S. on Miz to score the final fall and retain his championship.

Next was the Divas Championship match between reigning champion Beth Phoenix and Tamina Snuka. After a back-and forth-contest, Snuka would performed a Samoan drop to set up the Superfly Splash. Phoenix countered by superplexing Snuka from the top rope. Snuka then scored a superkick-Superfly Splash combination to Phoenix, leading to a close near-fall. Phoenix performed a Glam Slam on Snuka to score the pinfall and retain her title.

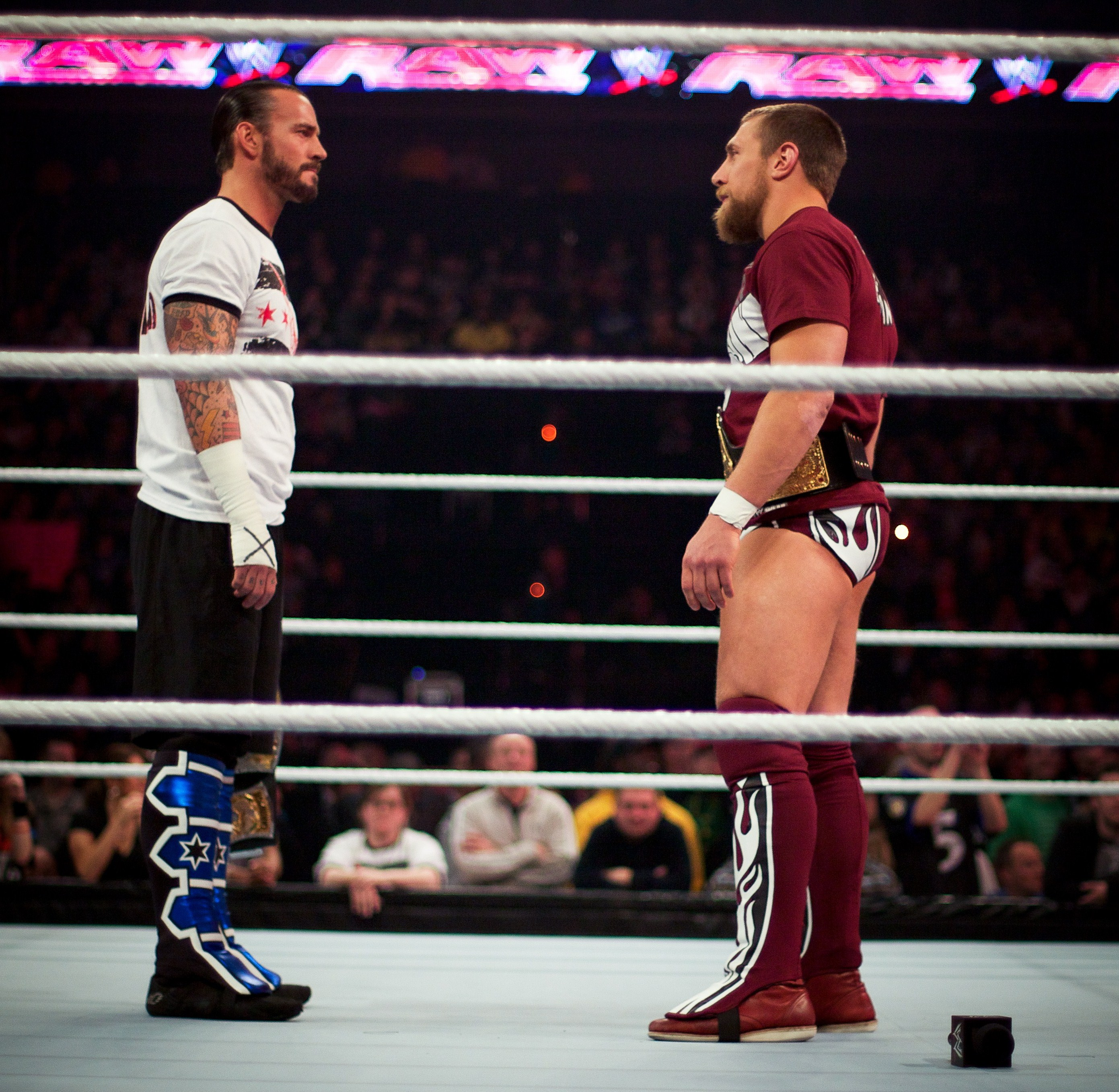
CM Punk and Daniel Bryan defended their respective WWE Championship and World Heavyweight Championship in separate Elimination Chamber matches.

Next was the Elimination Chamber match between reigning champion Daniel Bryan, Big Show, The Great Khali, Cody Rhodes, Wade Barrett, and Santino Marella for the World Heavyweight Championship. Barrett and Big Show were the first two in the ring, attacking one another. Rhodes entered at #3, who worked with Barrett for much of the match, attempting to slow down Big Show. Marella entered at #4, who immediately got attacked by Big Show. Khali entered at #5 and managed to dominate for a while but soon got speared by Show straight away and pinned. Show climbed Bryan's pod, ripping off the chains and attacking him. When Bryan got out, Rhodes and Barrett immediately attacked Show. After a DDT by Rhodes and a driving elbow drop from Barrett, Rhodes pinned and eliminated Big Show. Rhodes was eliminated by Marella after a roll-up, which led to Rhodes assaulting Marella with a Cross Rhodes. Barrett was eliminated by Marella, following a diving headbutt by Bryan. The final two were Bryan and Marella, who scored a close near-fall after performing The Cobra. Marella was shocked that Bryan had kicked out and while he was in shock, Bryan forced Marella to submit to the LeBell Lock, retaining his championship. After the match, Sheamus ran in and attacked Bryan in retaliation for Bryan spitting on him on the previous episode of SmackDown. This indicated that Sheamus had selected to challenge Bryan for the World Heavyweight Championship at WrestleMania XXVIII, which Sheamus won the right to do after his victory in the Royal Rumble match.

Next was an impromptu United States Championship match between Justin Gabriel (with Hornswoggle) and champion Jack Swagger (with Vickie Guerrero). Gabriel gave Swagger an intense challenge but Swagger eventually applied the Ankle lock and made Gabriel submit to retain the championship.

=== Main event ===
The main event was the Ambulance match between John Cena and Kane. They fought out of the ring for most of the match where Cena attacked Kane repeatedly with the steel ring steps. As he attempted to give Kane an Attitude Adjustment off the ring steps through the announce table, Kane countered and chokeslammed Cena through the table instead. With Cena down, Kane placed him onto a gurney and loaded him into the ambulance. Before Kane could shut the door, though, Cena fought his way out of the ambulance and took the fight to the top of the vehicle, where he finally finished off Kane with an Attitude Adjustment off the ambulance onto the equipment area. Cena then loaded Kane into the ambulance to score the victory.

== Reception ==
The Canadian Online Explorer gave the event a mixed review with an overall rating of 5 out of 10. The Elimination Chamber matches were particularly praised, with the WWE Championship match given an 8 out of 10 rating and the World Heavyweight Championship match a 9 out of 10. In contrast, the United States Championship match was criticized as it "seemed to be shoehorned into the card" and was given a 2 out of 10. The Divas Championship match and the Ambulance match were given a 4 out of 10.

== Results ==
No.	Results	Stipulations	Times
1^{D}	Hunico (with Camacho) defeated Alex Riley by pinfall	Singles match	—
2	CM Punk (c) defeated The Miz, Chris Jericho, Kofi Kingston, Dolph Ziggler (with Vickie Guerrero), and R-Truth	Elimination Chamber match for the WWE Championship	32:39
3	Beth Phoenix (c) defeated Tamina Snuka by pinfall	Singles match for the WWE Divas Championship	7:19
4	Daniel Bryan (c) defeated Santino Marella, Wade Barrett, Cody Rhodes, Big Show, and The Great Khali	Elimination Chamber match for the World Heavyweight Championship	34:04
5	Jack Swagger (c) (with Vickie Guerrero) defeated Justin Gabriel (with Hornswoggle) by submission	Singles match for the WWE United States Championship	3:05
6	John Cena defeated Kane	Ambulance match	21:20
(c) / – the champion(s) heading into the match; D / – this was a dark match

=== Elimination Chamber entrances and eliminations (WWE Championship) ===
Eliminated	Wrestler	Entered	Eliminated by	Method	Time
1	R-Truth	4	CM Punk	Pinfall	11:38
2	Dolph Ziggler	3	Chris Jericho	Pinfall	21:15
3	Kofi Kingston	2	Chris Jericho	Submission	26:58
4	Chris Jericho	6	N/A	Technical Knockout (Deemed Unable to continue)	28:09
5	The Miz	5	CM Punk	Pinfall	32:39
Winner	CM Punk (c)	1			

=== Elimination Chamber entrances and eliminations (World Heavyweight Championship) ===
Eliminated	Wrestler	Entered	Eliminated by	Method	Time
1	The Great Khali	5	Big Show	Pinfall	19:25
2	Big Show	1	Cody Rhodes	Pinfall	24:37
3	Cody Rhodes	3	Santino Marella	Pinfall	25:00
4	Wade Barrett	2	Santino Marella	Pinfall	30:37
5	Santino Marella	4	Daniel Bryan	Submission	34:04
Winner	Daniel Bryan (c)	6			
