= Elimination Chamber (2014) =

WWE pay-per-view event

- Promotional poster featuring Stephanie McMahon above the Elimination Chamber structure
- Promotion: WWE
- Date: February 23, 2014
- City: Minneapolis, Minnesota
- Venue: Target Center
- Attendance: 14,101
- Buy rate: 183,000

Pay-per-view chronology
| ← Previous; Royal Rumble | Next → NXT Arrival |

Elimination Chamber chronology
| ← Previous; 2013 | Next → 2015 |

The 2014 Elimination Chamber (known as No Escape in Germany) was a professional wrestling pay-per-view (PPV) event produced by WWE. It was the fifth annual Elimination Chamber event and took place on February 23, 2014, at the Target Center in Minneapolis, Minnesota. The event centered on the men's Elimination Chamber match, a type of roofed steel cage that surrounds the ring and ringside area with no disqualifications; the objective is to eliminate all other opponents either by pinfall or submission with championship implications at stake.

Eight matches took place at the event, including one on the Kickoff pre-show. One Elimination Chamber match was held which was the main event and saw Randy Orton retain the WWE World Heavyweight Championship against John Cena, Daniel Bryan, Christian, Cesaro, and Sheamus. In other prominent matches, Batista defeated Alberto Del Rio while The Wyatt Family (Bray Wyatt, Luke Harper, and Erick Rowan) defeated The Shield (Roman Reigns, Seth Rollins, and Dean Ambrose) in a six-man tag team match.

The event had 183,000 pay-per-view buys, down from previous year's 213,000 buys. This was WWE's final PPV event to air exclusively via traditional PPV outlets before the launch of their online streaming service, the WWE Network, the next day on February 24. Following its launch, all PPV events were simulcast on the WWE Network.

== Production ==
=== Background ===
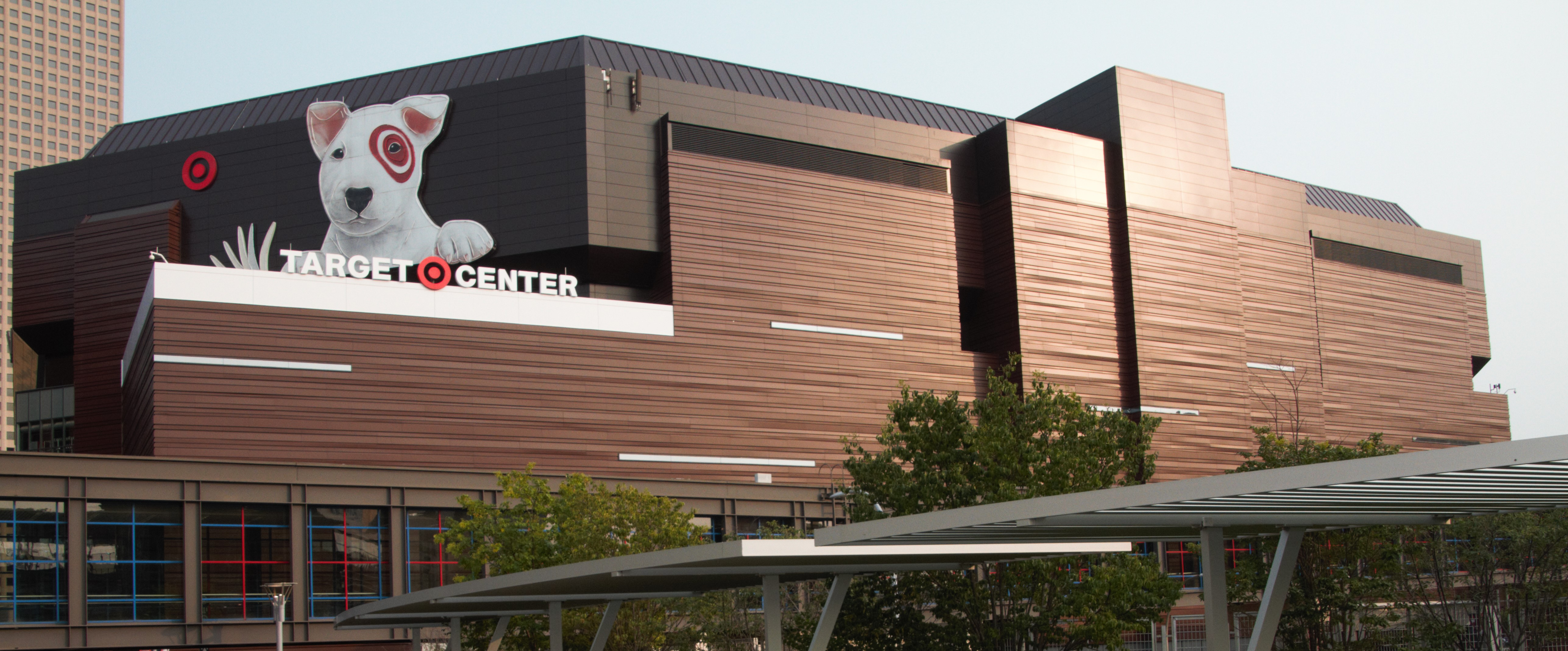
The fifth annual Elimination Chamber event was held at the Target Center in Minneapolis, Minnesota.

Elimination Chamber is a professional wrestling pay-per-view (PPV) event produced every February by WWE since 2010. The concept of the event is that one or two main event matches are contested inside the Elimination Chamber, either with championships or future opportunities at championships at stake. Announced on December 9, 2013, the fifth Elimination Chamber event was scheduled to be held on February 23, 2014, at the Target Center in Minneapolis, Minnesota. Tickets went on sale on December 14, 2013.

The Elimination Chamber match is an elimination-based match contested in a type of large roofed steel cage that surrounds the wrestling ring with an elevated platform around the ring. Within the Chamber are four inner pods, one behind each ring post. The match is contested by six participants. Two wrestlers start the match, while the other four are held within each inner pod with one selected randomly to enter the match at regular intervals, which continues until all four have been released. The objective is to eliminate all other opponents by pinfall or submission, and there are no disqualifications or count-outs.

In 2011 and since 2013, the show has been promoted as "No Escape" in Germany as it was feared that the name "Elimination Chamber" may remind people of the gas chambers used during the Holocaust; it was promoted as "No Way Out" in 2010 and 2012.

=== Storylines ===
The event comprised eight matches, including one on the Kickoff pre-show, that resulted from scripted storylines. Results were predetermined by WWE's writers, while storylines were produced on WWE's weekly television programs, Raw and SmackDown.

The main event was the Elimination Chamber match, where Randy Orton defended the WWE World Heavyweight Championship against five wrestlers after retaining it at the Royal Rumble from John Cena. The night after the Rumble on Raw, Daniel Bryan confronted The Authority for keeping him out of the Rumble match. Stephanie McMahon claimed they didn't want to overwork him with two matches in a night, but Bryan concluded they disliked him due to his popularity. He demanded Triple H put him in the Elimination Chamber title match. Triple H sent in The Shield (Roman Reigns, Seth Rollins, and United States Champion Dean Ambrose) to attack Bryan, but Cena and Sheamus saved him. This set up an Elimination Chamber qualifying match between those three and The Shield. During the match, The Wyatt Family (Bray Wyatt, Luke Harper, and Erick Rowan) attacked Cena, giving his team a disqualification win, meaning Cena, Sheamus, and Bryan all qualified for the Chamber match. On the January 31 episode of SmackDown, Cesaro defeated Dolph Ziggler to qualify, and his partner Jack Swagger lost his qualifier to a returning Christian. On the February 3 episode of Raw, Stephanie McMahon would mandate Randy Orton to compete in an Elimination Chamber Gauntlet where he must face each of his Chamber opponents in single matches. He was defeated by Daniel Bryan that same night, but secured a win by defeating Christian on the February 7 episode of SmackDown. He then was defeated by Cena on the February 10 episode of Raw and by Cesaro on the February 14 episode of SmackDown. His last opponent, Sheamus, won by disqualification, as The Shield and The Wyatt Family got involved on the February 17 episode of Raw.

On the January 31 episode of SmackDown, The Shield (Roman Reigns, Seth Rollins, and Dean Ambrose) refused Triple H's request for the group to drop the matter of The Wyatt Family (Bray Wyatt, Luke Harper, and Erick Rowan) disqualifying them from the Chamber match, so a six-man tag team match between the two teams was scheduled for Elimination Chamber.

After Batista's WWE return was announced in December, Alberto Del Rio began saying fans should talk about him instead and vowed to eliminate Batista from the Royal Rumble match. On the January 20 episode of Raw, following a victory over Rey Mysterio, Del Rio was attacked by Batista and hit with his finishing move the Batista Bomb. Del Rio entered the Rumble at number 27 and lasted just under three minutes before Batista, who was the next entrant, eliminated him. On the February 3 episode of Raw, Batista was interrupted and briefly assaulted by Del Rio, however the latter quickly escaped the ring. On the next Raw, after Del Rio defeated Dolph Ziggler, Batista came out and delivered a Batista Bomb to Del Rio through the announce table. Triple H then announced the two would wrestle at Elimination Chamber.

On the February 14 episode of SmackDown, Jack Swagger defeated Mark Henry, Rey Mysterio, and Kofi Kingston in a fatal four-way match to become the number one contender for the Intercontinental Championship, and would wrestle champion Big E for the title at the pay-per-view.

On WWE.com, it was announced The Usos (Jey Uso and Jimmy Uso) would face WWE Tag Team Champions The New Age Outlaws (Road Dogg and Billy Gunn) for the titles at the pay-per-view. This was made when The Usos asked the Outlaws to fight for the championship for the following weeks. Then, they accepted the challenge.

Former Prime Time Players tag team members Titus O'Neil and Darren Young were scheduled for a match at Elimination Chamber. The feud began on the January 31 episode of SmackDown, when O'Neil attacked Young after a tag team loss by the Prime Time Players, with O'Neil claiming that Young was "dead weight" and "holding him back".

The Elimination Chamber Kickoff Show saw Cody Rhodes and Goldust squaring off against RybAxel (Ryback and Curtis Axel).

== Event ==
Other on-screen personnel
| Role: | Name: |
|---|---|
| English commentators | Michael Cole |
| English commentators | Jerry Lawler |
| English commentators | John "Bradshaw" Layfield |
| Spanish commentators | Carlos Cabrera |
| Spanish commentators | Marcelo Rodriguez |
| Spanish commentators | Ricardo Rodriguez |
| Interviewers | Byron Saxton |
| Interviewers | Renee Young |
| Ring announcer | Lilian Garcia (SmackDown) |
| Ring announcer | Justin Roberts (Raw) |
| Referees | Charles Robinson |
| Referees | John Cone |
| Referees | Rod Zapata |
| Referees | Jason Ayers |
| Referees | Darrick Moore |
| Pre-show panel | Josh Mathews |
| Pre-show panel | Mark Henry |
| Pre-show panel | The Miz |
| Pre-show panel | Rey Mysterio |

=== Pre-show ===
During the Elimination Chamber Kickoff pre-show, Cody Rhodes and Goldust faced RybAxel (Ryback and Curtis Axel). Rhodes executed Cross Rhodes on Axel to win the match.

=== Preliminary matches ===
The actual pay-per-view opened with Big E defending the Intercontinental Championship against Jack Swagger. In the end, Swagger applied a Patriot Lock on Big E, but Big E performed an Enziguiri on Swagger to break the hold and executed a Big Ending on Swagger to retain the title.

Next, The New Age Outlaws (Road Dogg and Billy Gunn) defended the WWE Tag Team Championship against The Usos (Jey Uso and Jimmy Uso). The ending saw Jimmy perform a Superkick on Road Dogg, causing him to fall off the apron. Gunn pinned Jimmy with a roll-up to retain the titles.

After that, Titus O'Neil faced Darren Young. O'Neil executed a Clash of the Titus on Young to win the match.

In the fourth match, The Shield (United States Champion Dean Ambrose, Seth Rollins, and Roman Reigns) faced The Wyatt Family (Bray Wyatt, Luke Harper, and Erick Rowan). During the match, Ambrose fought with Wyatt into the arena stands, taking Ambrose out of the match. Harper and Rowan executed a double Chokeslam through a broadcast table on Rollins. In the climax, Reigns attempted a Spear on Wyatt, but Harper stood in the way and received a Spear from Reigns. Wyatt executed Sister Abigail on Reigns to win the match.

Next, AJ Lee defended the WWE Divas Championship against Cameron. Cameron won by disqualification after Tamina Snuka attacked her with a Clothesline, meaning AJ retained the title.

In the penultimate match, Batista faced Alberto Del Rio. During the match Batista was heavily booed, with "Bootista" chants breaking out. In the closing moments, Del Rio attempted to apply the Cross Armbreaker on Batista, but Batista pushed Del Rio into an exposed turnbuckle and executed a Batista Bomb on Del Rio to win the match.

=== Main event ===
The main event was the Elimination Chamber match for the WWE World Heavyweight Championship. Sheamus and Cesaro started the match and Daniel Bryan was the first to be released from his pod. Christian was next to be released from his pod. Next to be released was John Cena. Orton was the last to be released and making all 6 men still in the match. After making a few moves on the other 5 men, they all got up and backed Orton into a corner. Orton then locked himself in his pod, but Sheamus executed a Brogue Kick into the pod breaking open the plexi-glass and attacking Orton. Sheamus was eliminated by Christian after a Frog Splash off the top of a pod. Christian was eliminated by Bryan after a Running Knee. Cesaro was eliminated by Cena after submitting to the STF. Moments after the three eliminations, the Wyatt Family (Bray Wyatt, Luke Harper, and Erick Rowan) interfered in the match, attacking Cena after Orton pummels Cena from behind. After Wyatt performed Sister Abigail on Cena, Orton pinned Cena to eliminate him. Bryan climbed to the top rope and jumped Kane (DoO, wrestler) who came and assisted with removing The Wyatt Family and Cena from the chamber. Orton took advantage of Bryan being distracted to try and eliminate him. Bryan got Orton with a running knee, only for Kane to pull the referee out of the ring in the middle of the 3 count. Bryan kicked Kane in the head, and Orton executed an RKO to eliminate Bryan but he kicked out at 2. In the end, Kane hit Bryan before Orton executed another RKO to eliminate him and retain the WWE World Heavyweight Championship, leading Michael Cole to argue about the dominance the Authority had endured since its foundation at SummerSlam 2013.

== Aftermath ==
Batista and Alberto Del Rio faced each other in a rematch with Del Rio prevailing due to Randy Orton distracting Batista. Orton then mentioned the boisterous negative reaction since Batista's return. Batista responded by saying that WWE fans have their own voice. Later on Smackdown, however, Batista addressed the crowd, telling them he did not return to the company to be liked, only to win the championship; he then criticized and mocked the audience for supporting "195 lb wannabes" over him and vowed to destroy each and everyone of the fans' "heroes" on the road to WrestleMania, thus turning into a villain in the process.

Daniel Bryan confronted Triple H arguing about constantly getting screwed in his title matches ever since SummerSlam and challenged him to a match at WrestleMania XXX, but the latter declined. Later that night, Bryan defeated Kane, and after the match, Bryan voiced his opinion to Triple H by stating he should give what the fans want. Bryan challenged Triple H on the March 3 episode of Raw, but Triple H still declined. Frustrated, Bryan conjured up the Yes! Movement on the March 10 episode of Raw, involving WWE fans which gathered around the ring, and forced Triple H to accepting his match with the stipulation that if Bryan defeated Triple H, he would get inserted into the WWE World Heavyweight Championship match. On the March 17 episode of Raw, the stipulation was changed where instead the winner would advance to the main event for the title, thus assuring a triple threat match.

John Cena would call out The Wyatt Family (Bray Wyatt, Luke Harper, and Erick Rowan), only to be attacked by Wyatt. On the March 10 episode of Raw, when Hulk Hogan announced the André the Giant Memorial Battle Royal at WrestleMania XXX with Cena at first entering himself as the first entrant, only for the Wyatt Family to interrupt, insinuating that Hogan and Cena's heroic persona's are facades and that Bray is the "truth". Cena would then instead challenge Bray to a one-on-one match at WrestleMania with his legacy on the line, which Wyatt accepted.

The Usos (Jey Uso and Jimmy Uso) defeated The New Age Outlaws (Road Dogg and Billy Gunn) in a non-title match to ensure their spot again for the tag team titles. On the March 3 episode of Raw, The Usos finally defeated them to capture their first WWE Tag Team Championship.

Darren Young defeated Titus O'Neil in a rematch on the February 26 episode of Main Event.

Cameron got a rematch for the WWE Divas Championship on the following SmackDown against AJ Lee, but she failed to win the championship cleanly this time.

Elimination Chamber would mark as the final PPV in-ring competition event for Christian until the 2021 Royal Rumble where he made a surprise return as the number 24 entrant. On the March 24 episode of Raw, Christian won a fatal four-way match which included Alberto Del Rio, Dolph Ziggler, and Sheamus to challenge Big E for the WWE Intercontinental Championship but never happened due to Christian suffering a mild concussion. This led to Christian making part-time non-wrestling appearances on pre-shows and podcasts without any news regarding his career in wrestling. On October 27, 2015, Christian's profile was moved from the superstar section to the alumni section on WWE.com, noting Christian's retirement from professional wrestling with the company.

The following year's Elimination Chamber was originally scheduled to be a house show, a wrestling show that is not televised, but it was announced during the May 11, 2015, episode of Raw that Elimination Chamber would return on May 31. The event was initially replaced in February by Fastlane because many arenas were not able to physically support the Elimination Chamber structure, thus making it easier to book the February pay-per-view event without the structure. This was also WWE's last event to broadcast exclusively via traditional PPV outlets due to the launch of WWE's online streaming service, the WWE Network, the day after the 2014 event. Following its launch, these events began to be simulcast on PPV and the Network.

== Results ==
| No. | Results | Stipulations | Times |
|---|---|---|---|
| 1^{P} | Cody Rhodes and Goldust defeated RybAxel (Ryback and Curtis Axel) (with Larry Hennig) by pinfall | Tag team match | 10:25 |
| 2 | Big E (c) defeated Jack Swagger (with Zeb Colter) by pinfall | Singles match for the WWE Intercontinental Championship | 11:50 |
| 3 | The New Age Outlaws (Road Dogg and Billy Gunn) (c) defeated The Usos (Jey Uso and Jimmy Uso) by pinfall | Tag team match for the WWE Tag Team Championship | 8:34 |
| 4 | Titus O'Neil defeated Darren Young by pinfall | Singles match | 8:17 |
| 5 | The Wyatt Family (Bray Wyatt, Luke Harper, and Erick Rowan) defeated The Shield (Dean Ambrose, Seth Rollins, and Roman Reigns) by pinfall | Six-man tag team match | 22:42 |
| 6 | Cameron defeated AJ Lee (c) (with Tamina Snuka) by disqualification | Singles match for the WWE Divas Championship | 4:30 |
| 7 | Batista defeated Alberto Del Rio by pinfall | Singles match | 7:11 |
| 8 | Randy Orton (c) defeated Daniel Bryan, John Cena, Cesaro (with Zeb Colter), Christian, and Sheamus | Elimination Chamber match for the WWE World Heavyweight Championship | 37:30 |
(c) / – the champion(s) heading into the match; P / – the match was broadcast on the pre-show

=== Elimination Chamber entrances and eliminations ===
| Eliminated | Wrestler | Entered | Eliminated by | Method | Times |
|---|---|---|---|---|---|
| 1 | Sheamus | 1 | Christian | Pinfall | 26:03 |
| 2 | Christian | 4 | Daniel Bryan | Pinfall | 27:12 |
| 3 | Cesaro | 2 | John Cena | Submission | 30:10 |
| 4 | John Cena | 5 | Randy Orton | Pinfall | 32:38 |
| 5 | Daniel Bryan | 3 | Randy Orton | Pinfall | 37:30 |
| Winner | Randy Orton (c) | 6 | | | 37:30 |
