= WWE Elimination Chamber =

Professional wrestling event series

- WWE Elimination Chamber logo used since 2023 (minus 2024)
- Created by: Triple H Eric Bischoff
- Promotion: WWE
- Brands: Raw (2010–2011, 2018–present); SmackDown (2010–2011, 2017, 2019–present); 205 Live (2019)
- Other name(s): Elimination Chamber: Perth (2024); Elimination Chamber: Toronto (2025); Elimination Chamber: Chicago (2026)
- First event: 2010
- Signature match: Elimination Chamber match

WWE Elimination Chamber is a professional wrestling event produced by WWE, a Connecticut-based professional wrestling promotion. It is available only through pay-per-view (PPV) since 2010 and WWE's livestreaming services since 2015. The event was established in 2010, replacing No Way Out as the annual February PPV. The concept of the event is that one or two main event matches are contested inside the Elimination Chamber, either with championships or future opportunities at championships at stake. The Elimination Chamber match itself had been created in 2002 and held at various other WWE pay-per-views before the establishment of the namesake event in 2010.

The 2014 event was notable as it was WWE's final event to air exclusively via traditional PPV outlets due to the launch of the WWE Network the next day, as all PPV events since have aired on both PPV and livestreamed on the WWE Network. The following year, the event's February slot was replaced by Fastlane, with the 2015 Elimination Chamber instead being held in May. That year's event also saw the first tag team Elimination Chamber match. Although the event did not occur in 2016, it returned in 2017 with a revamped Chamber design. The event also returned to the February PPV slot.

While the eponymous match was originally only for male wrestlers, the 2018 event featured the first-ever women's version, as well as the first seven-man Elimination Chamber match. The 2019 event determined the inaugural holders of the WWE Women's Tag Team Championship. The 2020 event was notable as it was WWE's final PPV event held before the onset of the COVID-19 pandemic, which caused all of WWE's shows to be held behind closed doors until mid-2021. The 2020 event was also moved to March as Super ShowDown was held in February, but the event returned to its February slot for the 2021 event, which was WWE's final PPV held before the American version of the WWE Network merged under Peacock that March. The 2022 event was held in Jeddah, Saudi Arabia, thus making it the first Elimination Chamber event to take place outside of the United States and on a Saturday. Subsequent events would continue to be held outside of the US, with the 2023 event and the 2025 event in Canada and the 2024 event in Perth, Australia. The 2025 event was the first to livestream on Netflix outside the United States as most other countries merged under the service in January 2025. Since 2022, there has been one men's Elimination Chamber match and one women's Elimination Chamber match.

To coincide with the brand extension, the events in 2010 and 2011 featured wrestlers from the Raw and SmackDown brands before the first brand split ended in August 2011. Following the reintroduction of the brand split in mid-2016, the 2017 event was held exclusively for wrestlers from SmackDown. The 2018 event was then Raw-exclusive and was the final Raw-branded PPV of the second brand split, as following that year's WrestleMania 34, WWE discontinued brand-exclusive pay-per-views. The 2019 event in turn featured wrestlers from both the Raw and SmackDown brands, as well as 205 Live, while the events afterwards have just featured Raw and SmackDown.

In Germany, Elimination Chamber is known by a different name to avoid connotations of the gas chambers used during the Holocaust in World War II. In 2010, it retained the "No Way Out" (German: Kein Ausweg) name, which was also used for the event in 2012, but in 2011, it was called No Escape (German: Kein Entkommen), which became its permanent German name in 2013.

== History ==
The Elimination Chamber match was established by World Wrestling Entertainment (WWE) in 2002 with Triple H and Eric Bischoff noted as the creators of the match. It was first held at that year's Survivor Series pay-per-view (PPV). Over the years, the match was held at other PPV events, including No Way Out. After Elimination Chamber matches were featured at the 2008 and 2009 No Way Out events, WWE conducted a survey in September 2009 indicating a possible renaming for No Way Out. Voted by fans via the promotion's website, Elimination Chamber became the name of the February 2010 pay-per-view event, winning against Heavy Metal, Battle Chamber, Chamber of Conflict, and the original No Way Out name. Despite the poll, it was later announced that Elimination Chamber would not be considered as part of the No Way Out chronology and would instead be a new chronology, which in turn became the annual February PPV. The inaugural Elimination Chamber event was held on February 21, 2010, at the Scottrade Center in St. Louis, Missouri. To coincide with the brand extension where the promotion divided its roster into brands where wrestlers exclusively perform, the 2010 and 2011 events featured wrestlers from both the Raw and SmackDown brands. In April 2011, the company ceased using its full name, with "WWE" becoming an orphaned initialism, and in August, the brand extension ended.

The 2014 event, which was held on February 23, was WWE's final event to air exclusively via PPV, as the following day, WWE launched their online streaming service, the WWE Network, and events were broadcast on both PPV and livestreamed on the Network. In 2015, the event was initially replaced in February by Fastlane because many arenas were not able to physically support the Elimination Chamber structure, thus making it easier to book the February pay-per-view event without the structure. However, the 2015 Elimination Chamber event was later announced to be streamed exclusively on the WWE Network in the United States on May 31 and was available on PPV internationally. Although the event did not occur in 2016, it returned in 2017 and featured wrestlers exclusively from the SmackDown brand, following the reintroduction of the brand split in mid-2016. The 2017 event also moved Elimination Chamber back to its regular February slot with Fastlane instead being held in March, and it also introduced a redesign to the Chamber structure itself. The 2018 event was then a Raw-branded show. It was also WWE's final Raw-exclusive PPV of the second brand split, as following that year's WrestleMania 34, WWE discontinued brand-exclusive pay-per-views, thus the 2019 event featured wrestlers from both the Raw and SmackDown brands, as well as 205 Live, although it was the only to include 205 Live. The 2020 event was moved to March as Super ShowDown was held in February, but Elimination Chamber returned to its February slot in 2021.

The 2020 event, held on March 8, would be the final WWE PPV and livestreaming to be held in-person with spectators before the COVID-19 pandemic took effect. Beginning March 13, Raw and SmackDown's events were moved to the WWE Performance Center in Orlando, Florida and held behind closed doors. In August, the company relocated Raw and SmackDown's shows to a bio-secure bubble called the WWE ThunderDome, which was first hosted at Orlando's Amway Center. The ThunderDome was then relocated to Tropicana Field in St. Petersburg, Florida in December, which was also the location of the 2021 Elimination Chamber. In mid-July 2021, WWE resumed a live touring schedule.

In March 2021, the American version of the WWE Network became a premium channel under NBCUniversal's streaming service, Peacock. As a result, the 2021 Elimination Chamber was the final PPV and livestreaming event to air on the American version of the WWE Network before the launch of Peacock's WWE Network channel. After a brief transitional period, the standalone version of the WWE Network in the U.S. shut down on April 4, with future events only available via Peacock's WWE Network channel and traditional PPV. This did not affect other countries at the time, which had maintained the separate WWE Network service distributed by WWE (a couple of other countries have since had the Network merged under a different streaming service, such as Binge in Australia in 2023).

In early 2018, WWE began a 10-year strategic multiplatform partnership with the General Sports Authority in support of Saudi Vision 2030, Saudi Arabia's social and economic reform program. The seventh event under this partnership was announced as the 2022 Elimination Chamber, scheduled for Saturday, February 19, 2022, at the Jeddah Super Dome in Jeddah. It was in turn the first Elimination Chamber event to take place in Saudi Arabia, the first to take place outside of the United States, the first to be held on a Saturday, and the first Elimination Chamber to air on Peacock. It was also WWE's first previously established annual event to take place in the country.

The 2023 Elimination Chamber was scheduled to take place on Saturday, February 18, 2023, at the Bell Centre in Montreal, Quebec, Canada. This marked the first Elimination Chamber event to be held in Canada, and the second to be held outside of the United States, after the previous year's event. This also marked the first major WWE event to be held in Montreal since Breaking Point in 2009. WWE would continue its run of holding Elimination Chamber outside of the United States, with the 2024 event, held on February 24 at the Perth Stadium in Perth, Australia, marking WWE's first event to be held in Australia since Super Show-Down in October 2018. The 2025 event returned to Canada but in Toronto, Ontario, and was the first Elimination Chamber to livestream on Netflix in most international markets following the WWE Network's merger under the service in January 2025 in those areas.

== Concept ==
The Elimination Chamber event centers around the Elimination Chamber match, and the event typically includes one or two main event matches that are contested inside the structure, either with championships or future opportunities at championships at stake. The match is generally contested by six participants (or six tag teams for a tag team Chamber match), with two beginning the bout in the ring, while the other four are held within a smaller chamber within the structure. In the case of a seven-person match, which occurred at the 2018 event, three wrestlers begin the match instead of two. Every five minutes, one of the four participants (or teams) within an inner chamber is released into the ongoing match. This continues until all four have been released, with the match typically lasting over twenty minutes. The objective of the match is to eliminate all opponents via pinfall or submission, which originally could occur in the ring or on the chamber's elevated floor outside the ring, although in 2012, this was changed so that all pinfalls and submissions must take place in the ring. Disqualifications do not apply in the process of elimination. The winner of the match is the last remaining participant (or team) after all others have been eliminated (for tag team Chamber matches, only one person of a team must be eliminated to eliminate the team itself).

=== Elimination Chamber matches ===
From 2010 to 2012, the event featured two Elimination Chamber matches, usually one for each brand until August 2011 when the brand extension ended. In 2010, Raw's Chamber match was for the WWE Championship while SmackDown's Chamber match was for the World Heavyweight Championship (2002–2013 version). In 2011, the Raw Chamber match determined the number one contender for the WWE Championship at WrestleMania XXVII, while the SmackDown Chamber match was again for the World Heavyweight Championship. In 2012, although the brand extension had ended, there were still two Chamber matches with one each for the WWE Championship and World Heavyweight Championship, respectively. In 2013, only one Chamber match took place with the winner receiving a World Heavyweight Championship match at WrestleMania 29. Following the unification of the WWE Championship and World Heavyweight Championship as the WWE World Heavyweight Championship in December 2013, the 2014 event had only one Chamber match, which was for the unified championship. In 2015, there were two Chamber matches. The first featured the first-ever tag team Chamber match, which was for the WWE Tag Team Championship (renamed Raw Tag Team Championship in 2016 and then World Tag Team Championship in 2024), while the second Chamber match was for the vacant WWE Intercontinental Championship.

After the brand extension was reinstated in mid-2016, the WWE World Heavyweight Championship reverted to being called the WWE Championship and became exclusive to SmackDown. The 2017 event was in turn SmackDown-exclusive and the main event was a Chamber match for the brand's WWE Championship. The 2018 event was then Raw-exclusive and featured two Chamber matches. One was the first-ever women's Chamber match and it was for the Raw Women's Championship. The other was a men's Chamber match which was the first-ever seven-man Chamber match to determine the number one contender for the Universal Championship at WrestleMania 34.

After brand-exclusive PPVs were discontinued following WrestleMania 34, the 2019 event featured both brands. There were two Chamber matches. One was a women's tag team Chamber match to determine the inaugural holders of the WWE Women's Tag Team Championship and featured three teams from each brand, while the other was a SmackDown-exclusive Chamber match for the WWE Championship. Later that year, the Universal Championship and WWE Championship switched brands. The 2020 event featured one Chamber match for each brand. SmackDown's was a tag team Chamber match for the SmackDown Tag Team Championship, while Raw's was a women's Chamber match for a Raw Women's Championship match at WrestleMania 36. At the 2021 event, the Raw Chamber match was for the WWE Championship, while SmackDown's Chamber match was for an immediate Universal Championship match that same night. The 2022 event had two Chamber matches, but both were Raw-exclusive. One was a men's Chamber match for the WWE Championship while the other was a women's Chamber match for a Raw Women's Championship match at WrestleMania 38.

The 2023 event had two Chamber matches, one each for the men and women. The men's match was Raw-exclusive and was for the United States Championship, which was the first time for the title to be contended in the match. The women's Chamber match was for a Raw Women's Championship match at WrestleMania 39, and it featured three wrestlers from each brand (the Raw Women's Championship later moved to SmackDown and was renamed as the WWE Women's Championship).

As the WWE Championship and Universal Championship had been held and defended together as the Undisputed WWE Universal Championship since April 2022, a new World Heavyweight Championship was created in April 2023 and subsequently designated to Raw after the Undisputed WWE Universal Championship became exclusive to SmackDown as a result of the 2023 WWE Draft. The Raw and SmackDown women's championships also switched brands and were renamed as the WWE Women's Championship and Women's World Championship, respectively. The 2024 event would then also have two Chamber matches with one each for the men and women and both matches featured wrestlers from both Raw and SmackDown. The women's match had three wrestlers from each brand, while the men's had three from SmackDown, two from Raw, and one free agent. Each match determined the respective challengers for the World Heavyweight Championship and Women's World Championship at WrestleMania XL. Also at WrestleMania XL, the Universal Championship was retired, with the Undisputed WWE Universal Championship truncated to Undisputed WWE Championship, following the lineage of the WWE Championship. The 2025 event would also have a men's and women's chamber match, with the respective winners earning matches for the Undisputed WWE Championship and Women's World Championship at WrestleMania 41.

== Locations ==
Locations for Elimination Chamber in the United States and Canada.
Location for Elimination Chamber in Saudi Arabia.
Location for Elimination Chamber in Australia.

== Events ==
Raw-branded event	SmackDown-branded event

#	Event	Date	City	Venue	Main event	Ref.
1	Elimination Chamber (2010)	February 21, 2010	St. Louis, Missouri	Scottrade Center	The Undertaker (c) vs. Chris Jericho vs. CM Punk vs. John Morrison vs. Rey Mysterio vs. R-Truth in an Elimination Chamber match for the World Heavyweight Championship	
2	Elimination Chamber (2011)	February 20, 2011	Oakland, California	Oracle Arena	CM Punk vs. John Cena vs. John Morrison vs. Randy Orton vs. R-Truth vs. Sheamus in an Elimination Chamber match for a WWE Championship match at WrestleMania XXVII	
3	Elimination Chamber (2012)	February 19, 2012	Milwaukee, Wisconsin	Bradley Center	John Cena vs. Kane in an Ambulance match	
4	Elimination Chamber (2013)	February 17, 2013	New Orleans, Louisiana	New Orleans Arena	The Rock (c) vs. CM Punk for the WWE Championship	
5	Elimination Chamber (2014)	February 23, 2014	Minneapolis, Minnesota	Target Center	Randy Orton (c) vs. Cesaro vs. Christian vs. Daniel Bryan vs. John Cena vs. Sheamus in an Elimination Chamber match for the WWE World Heavyweight Championship	
6	Elimination Chamber (2015)	May 31, 2015	Corpus Christi, Texas	American Bank Center	Seth Rollins (c) vs. Dean Ambrose for the WWE World Heavyweight Championship	
7	Elimination Chamber (2017)	February 12, 2017	Phoenix, Arizona	Talking Stick Resort Arena	John Cena (c) vs. AJ Styles vs. Baron Corbin vs. Bray Wyatt vs. Dean Ambrose vs. The Miz in an Elimination Chamber match for the WWE Championship	
8	Elimination Chamber (2018)	February 25, 2018	Paradise, Nevada	T-Mobile Arena	Braun Strowman vs. Elias vs. Finn Bálor vs. John Cena vs. Roman Reigns vs. Seth Rollins vs. The Miz in an Elimination Chamber match for a WWE Universal Championship match at WrestleMania 34	
9	Elimination Chamber (2019)	February 17, 2019	Houston, Texas	Toyota Center	Daniel Bryan (c) vs. AJ Styles vs. Jeff Hardy vs. Kofi Kingston vs. Randy Orton vs. Samoa Joe in an Elimination Chamber match for the WWE Championship	
10	Elimination Chamber (2020)	March 8, 2020	Philadelphia, Pennsylvania	Wells Fargo Center	Asuka vs. Liv Morgan vs. Natalya vs. Ruby Riott vs. Sarah Logan vs. Shayna Baszler in an Elimination Chamber match for a WWE Raw Women's Championship match at WrestleMania 36	
11	Elimination Chamber (2021)	February 21, 2021	St. Petersburg, Florida	WWE ThunderDome at Tropicana Field	Drew McIntyre (c) vs. AJ Styles vs. Jeff Hardy vs. Kofi Kingston vs. Randy Orton vs. Sheamus in an Elimination Chamber match for the WWE Championship then Drew McIntyre (c) vs. The Miz for the WWE Championship in Miz's Money in the Bank cash-in match	
12	Elimination Chamber (2022)	February 19, 2022	Jeddah, Mecca Province, Saudi Arabia	Jeddah Super Dome	Bobby Lashley (c) vs. AJ Styles vs. Austin Theory vs. Brock Lesnar vs. Riddle vs. Seth "Freakin" Rollins in an Elimination Chamber match for the WWE Championship	
13	Elimination Chamber (2023)	February 18, 2023	Montreal, Quebec, Canada	Bell Centre	Roman Reigns (c) vs. Sami Zayn for the Undisputed WWE Universal Championship	
14	Elimination Chamber (2024)	February 24, 2024	Perth, Western Australia, Australia	Perth Stadium	Rhea Ripley (c) vs. Nia Jax for the Women's World Championship	
15	Elimination Chamber (2025)	March 1, 2025	Toronto, Ontario, Canada	Rogers Centre	CM Punk vs. Damian Priest vs. Drew McIntyre vs. John Cena vs. Logan Paul vs. Seth "Freakin" Rollins in an Elimination Chamber match for an Undisputed WWE Championship match at WrestleMania 41	
16	Elimination Chamber (2026)	February 28, 2026	Chicago, Illinois	United Center	Cody Rhodes vs. Je'Von Evans vs. LA Knight vs. Logan Paul vs. Randy Orton vs. Trick Williams in an Elimination Chamber match for an Undisputed WWE Championship match at WrestleMania 42	
(c) – refers to the champion(s) heading into the match

== See also ==
- WWE in Saudi Arabia
- WWE in Canada
- WWE in Australia
