= Elimination Chamber (2013) =

WWE pay-per-view event

- Promotional poster featuring CM Punk, The Rock, John Cena, Sheamus, Ryback, Big Show, and the roof of the Elimination Chamber structure
- Promotion: WWE
- Date: February 17, 2013
- City: New Orleans, Louisiana
- Venue: New Orleans Arena
- Attendance: 15,669
- Buy rate: 213,000

Pay-per-view chronology
← Previous; Royal Rumble	Next → WrestleMania 29

Elimination Chamber chronology
← Previous; 2012	Next → 2014

The 2013 Elimination Chamber (known as No Escape in Germany) was a professional wrestling pay-per-view (PPV) event produced by WWE. It was the fourth annual Elimination Chamber event and took place on February 17, 2013, at the New Orleans Arena in New Orleans, Louisiana. The event centered on the men's Elimination Chamber match, a type of roofed steel cage that surrounds the ring and ringside area with no disqualifications; the objective is to eliminate all other opponents either by pinfall or submission with championship implications at stake.

Eight matches, including one on the Pre-Show, were contested at the event. In the main event, The Rock retained the WWE Championship against CM Punk. Only one Elimination Chamber match occurred, which saw Jack Swagger defeat Chris Jericho, Randy Orton, Daniel Bryan, Kane, and Mark Henry to determine the number one contender for the World Heavyweight Championship at WrestleMania 29. Also on the show, Kaitlyn retained the WWE Divas Championship against Tamina Snuka, and The Shield (Dean Ambrose, Roman Reigns, and Seth Rollins) defeated John Cena, Ryback, and Sheamus.

The event received 223,000 pay-per-view buys, up from 178,000 buys the previous year's event received. This was the last Elimination Chamber event to feature the previous version of the World Heavyweight Championship, which was unified with the WWE Championship in December.

== Production ==
=== Background ===
The fourth annual Elimination Chamber event was held at the New Orleans Arena in New Orleans, Louisiana.

Elimination Chamber is a professional wrestling pay-per-view (PPV) event produced every February by WWE since 2010. The concept of the event is that one or two main event matches are contested inside the Elimination Chamber, either with championships or future opportunities at championships at stake. The fourth Elimination Chamber event was scheduled to be held on February 17, 2013, at the New Orleans Arena in New Orleans, Louisiana.

The Elimination Chamber match is an elimination-based match contested in a type of large roofed steel cage that surrounds the wrestling ring with an elevated platform around the ring. Within the Chamber are four inner pods, one behind each ring post. The match is contested by six participants. Two wrestlers start the match, while the other four are held within each inner pod with one selected randomly to enter the match at regular intervals, which continues until all four have been released. The objective is to eliminate all other opponents by pinfall or submission, and there are no disqualifications or count-outs.

In 2011, the show was promoted as "No Escape" in Germany as it was feared that the name "Elimination Chamber" may remind people of the gas chambers used during the Holocaust. It was then promoted as "No Way Out" in 2012, just as it was in 2010, but it returned to the "No Escape" title for 2013.

=== Storylines ===
The professional wrestling matches at Elimination Chamber featured professional wrestlers performing as characters in scripted events pre-determined by the hosting promotion, WWE. Storylines were produced on WWE's weekly television shows, Raw and SmackDown.

CM Punk began to feud with The Rock after Punk defeated Ryback in a Tables, Ladders, and Chairs match for the WWE Championship with the interference of The Shield (Roman Reigns, Seth Rollins, and Dean Ambrose). Rock defeated Punk for the title at the Royal Rumble, after The Rock requested a restart of the match when Mr. McMahon was about strip the title from Punk when the lights went out and Rock was laid out on the announce table. The following night, Punk invoked his rematch clause for the title, and on the February 11 episode of Raw, his manager Paul Heyman successfully negotiated whereby if Rock loses by countout or disqualification, Punk would be awarded the title.

Big Show would begin to feud with Alberto Del Rio after humiliating Del Rio's personal ring announcer, Ricardo Rodriguez, sarcastically picking him to fight Big Show for the World Heavyweight Championship during "Champion's Choice Night" on the New Year's Eve 2012 episode of Raw, leading to a disqualification win for Big Show after Del Rio interfered. On the January 11, 2013, episode of SmackDown, Del Rio defeated Big Show in a Last Man Standing match for the championship. Three days later on Raw, Big Show announced that he would invoke his rematch clause at the Royal Rumble. The week after, he made the match a Last Man Standing match. Del Rio retained the title after Royal Rumble when Rodriguez duct taped Big Show's legs to the bottom rope, preventing him from standing up. After continuing attacks against each other, both agreed to another title match at Elimination Chamber.

After John Cena announced that he would face the WWE Champion at WrestleMania 29, SmackDown general manager Booker T made an Elimination Chamber match to determine the number one contender for the World Heavyweight Championship with only six entrants allowed to participate by winning qualifying matches issued by Booker T and Theodore Long. Randy Orton defeated Wade Barrett to qualify and Daniel Bryan defeated Rey Mysterio to qualify also. Kane and Jack Swagger defeated Dolph Ziggler and Zack Ryder respectively to earn qualification. With Mark Henry and Chris Jericho making recent returns to WWE, both demanded a spot in the Chamber. Both defeated men who had already qualified for the Elimination Chamber match; Henry defeated Orton and Jericho defeated Bryan.

== Event ==
Other on-screen personnel
Role:	Name:
English commentators	Michael Cole
English commentators	Jerry Lawler
English commentators	John Bradshaw Layfield
Pre-show commentators	Tony Dawson
Pre-show commentators	Matt Striker
Spanish commentators	Carlos Cabrera
Spanish commentators	Marcelo Rodríguez
Interviewers	Josh Mathews
Ring announcers	Lilian Garcia
Ring announcers	Justin Roberts
Referees	Charles Robinson
Referees	John Cone
Referees	Mike Chioda
Referees	Ryan Tran
Referees	Scott Armstrong
Referees	Chad Patton
Referees	Rod Zapata

=== Pre-show ===
The Elimination Chamber Pre-Show saw Tensai and Brodus Clay take on Team Rhodes Scholars (Cody Rhodes and Damien Sandow). Clay and Tensai won with a Double Splash, extending their unbeaten streak.

=== Preliminary matches ===
The first match that aired on the pay-per-view was the World Heavyweight Championship match, between The Big Show and the defending World Heavyweight Champion Alberto Del Rio. For the finish, Del Rio enzuigiri kicked Ricardo Rodriguez's bucket that Show was holding into his head which eventually led to his signature cross arm breaker for the submission victory.

The second match featured United States Champion Antonio Cesaro defending his title against The Miz, who came into the match with an injured shoulder via an attack by Cesaro on Raw. Cesaro eventually won by disqualification after he knocked The Miz's leg, causing him to fall knee-first into his groin therefore forcing the referee to call for a low blow. Afterwards, a frustrated Miz intentionally gave Cesaro a low blow.

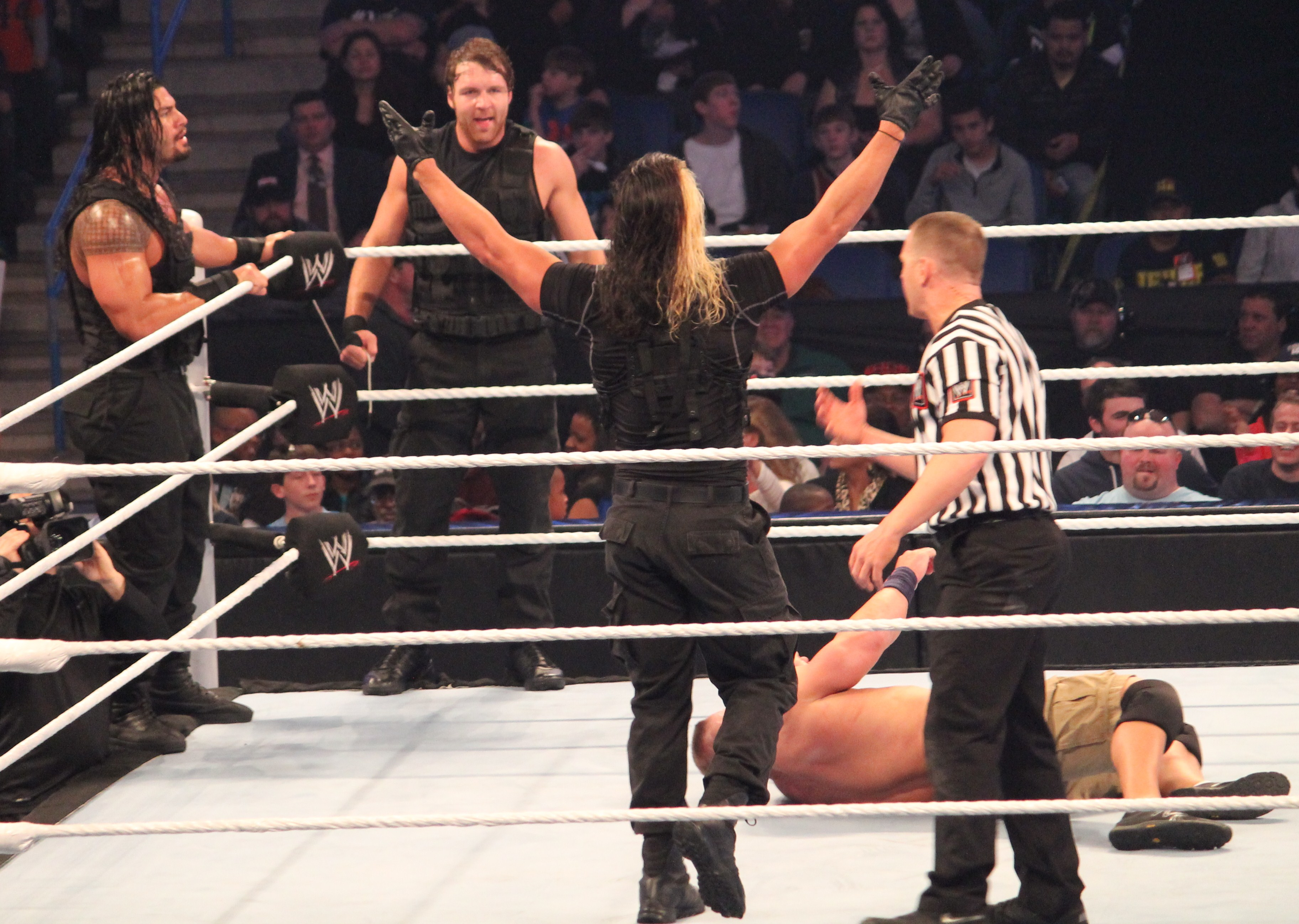
The Shield (Roman Reigns, Dean Ambrose, and Seth Rollins) at the event, with John Cena lying on the mat

The third match was the Elimination Chamber match, which involved Mark Henry, Daniel Bryan, Randy Orton, Kane, Chris Jericho, and Jack Swagger. Jericho and Bryan started the match, while the other four competitors were locked inside 'pods'. One pod at a time opened during the match at intervals of four minutes, releasing a wrestler into the match. Swagger was the first wrestler released, followed by Kane, Orton, and finally Henry. All of Henry's opponents had stayed down before the World's Strongest Man entered the match. Henry used the World's Strongest Slam to eliminate Bryan first and then Kane by pinfall. Swagger, Jericho and Orton teamed up to eliminate Henry, after a Big Boot by Swagger, Codebreaker by Jericho and an RKO by Orton in order for the Viper to pin Henry after 23 minutes. After Henry was eliminated, he re-entered the chamber and executed three World's Strongest Slams: one on Orton, one on Jericho and one on Swagger, but everything got broken up at last. Jericho was the next man to be eliminated, after an RKO from Orton. Immediately after the pin, Swagger rolled Orton up to win and become the Number 1 contender for the World Heavyweight Championship at WrestleMania 29.

The following match was the six-man tag team match between the hero team of John Cena, Sheamus, and Ryback against The Shield (Dean Ambrose, Roman Reigns, and Seth Rollins). The face team took control of the early goings of the match with Cena, Ryback and Sheamus tagging each other and beating down Seth Rollins. The match became imbalanced when Reigns and Ambrose interfered. Reigns then speared Sheamus through the barricade. After what appeared to be a comeback from Cena's unit, Reigns also then speared Ryback as he was going for a Shell Shock on Rollins, who pinned him as Cena was preoccupied.

The fifth match of the evening was an unannounced match between Dolph Ziggler and Kofi Kingston. Ziggler was caught by Kingston's Trouble in Paradise but only managed a two count when Big E Langston pulled Ziggler to safety. After throwing Kingston into the ring post, Ziggler connected with a Zig Zag for the win. After the match, Langston, who headed up the entrance with Ziggler and AJ Lee, came back to the ring to attack Kingston, eventually laying him out with the Big Ending.

The sixth match was the WWE Divas Championship match between Tamina Snuka and the reigning champion Kaitlyn. Tamina went for the Superfly Splash but missed, receiving a spear from the champ for the winning pin.

=== Main event ===
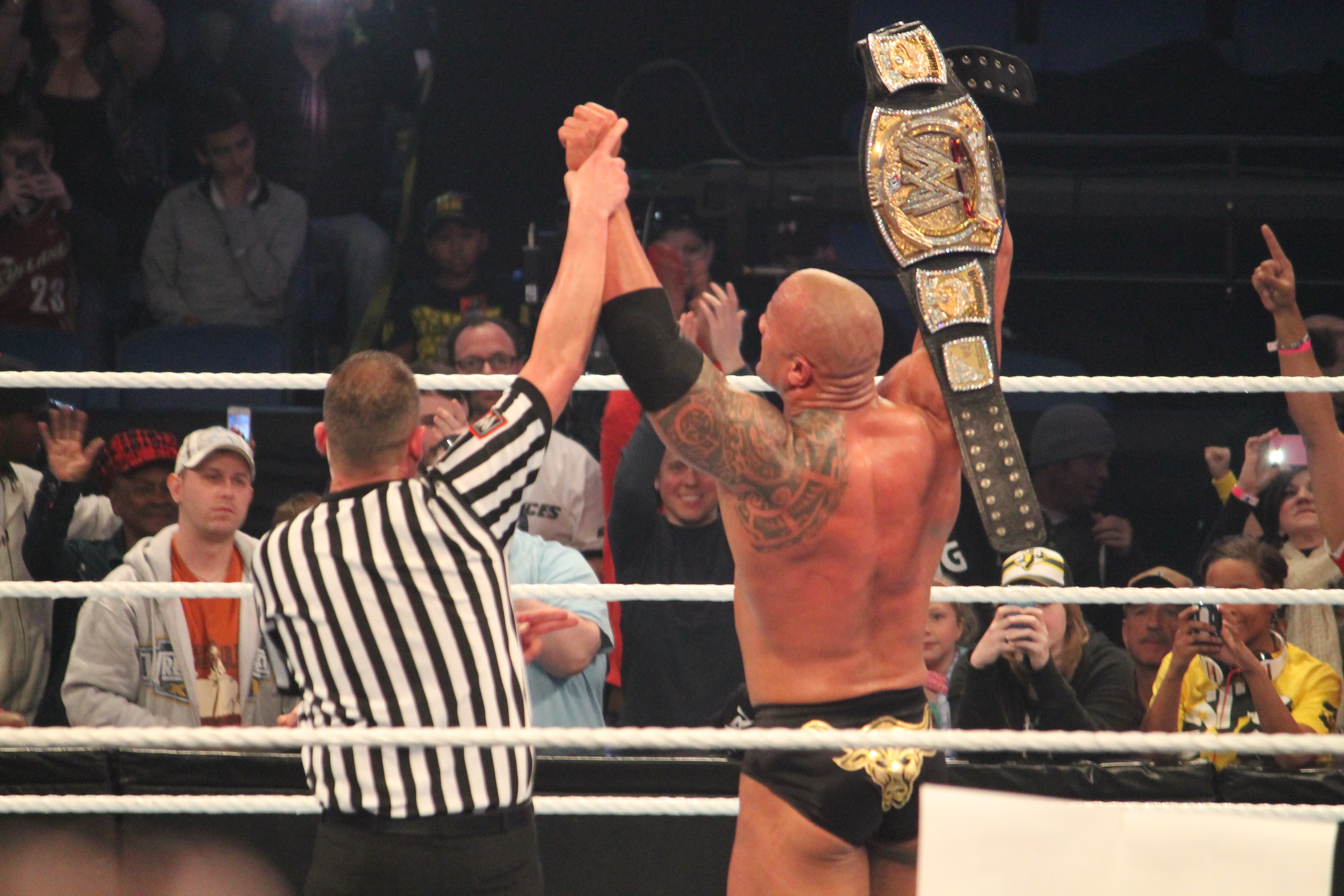
The Rock after retaining the WWE Championship at the event.

In the main event, The Rock faced CM Punk for the WWE Championship. Near the end, Punk performed an Irish Whip on Rock, then Rock executed a Rock Bottom on Punk for a near-fall. This caused Rock to bump referee Mike Chioda, who was distracted by Paul Heyman, to the floor. Punk executed the GTS on Rock, and would get an 18 count on Rock but since the referee was knocked out, the pin was not counted. After The Rock countered a second GTS attempt with a People's Elbow on Punk for a near-fall, Punk accidentally rolled on the replacement referee's ankle, making him unavailable for the rest of the match. Moments later, Rock ducked as Punk tried to hit him with his title belt, instead hitting Heyman. This allowed Rock to execute a second Rock Bottom on Punk to win the match. This meant that The Rock would head to WrestleMania 29 to defend his championship against Royal Rumble winner John Cena in a rematch from WrestleMania XXVIII.

== Aftermath ==
The next night on Raw, The Rock revealed a new design for the WWE Championship title. Cena, as the winner of the Royal Rumble, became the number one contender for the title and was about to make his way down to the ring to confront Rock until he was attacked by CM Punk who felt he was still the number one contender. Cena and Punk had a match to determine the number one contender in which Cena came out victorious. Cena defeated Rock to capture the WWE Championship at WrestleMania 29.

After failing his chances of winning back the WWE Championship, CM Punk set his sights on The Undertaker with the sole intention at wanting to end his undefeated WrestleMania Streak. Punk defeated Randy Orton, Big Show and Sheamus on the Old School Raw special on March 4 to earn his right to face The Undertaker at WrestleMania 29, however, he failed to end The Streak at the event after Undertaker defeated him to extend his undefeated Streak to 21-0. Punk would later become the final victim of The Streak as it would end after Undertaker was defeated by Brock Lesnar at WrestleMania XXX.

At WrestleMania 29, Alberto Del Rio defeated Jack Swagger to retain the World Heavyweight Championship. The next day on Raw, Dolph Ziggler cashed in his Money In the Bank briefcase on an injured Del Rio, and defeated Del Rio to capture the World Heavyweight Championship.

On the March 8 episode of SmackDown, Layla began turning heel when she cost Kaitlyn a non-title match against Tamina. The angle was rumored to lead to Kaitlyn defending the Divas Championship against the evil Layla at WrestleMania 29, but it was dropped a week later.

The following night on Raw, The Miz defeated Antonio Cesaro in a non-title No Disqualification match via submission to earn another shot at the United States Championship. The title rematch took place the following week on SmackDown in a Two-out-of-Three Falls match, where Miz failed again to capture the title from Cesaro.

This was the last Elimination Chamber event to feature the previous version of the World Heavyweight Championship, which was unified with the WWE Championship in December at TLC: Tables, Ladders & Chairs; the World Heavyweight Championship was immediately retired while the WWE Championship became known as the WWE World Heavyweight Championship.

== Results ==
No.	Results	Stipulations	Times
1^{P}	Tons of Funk (Brodus Clay and Tensai) defeated Team Rhodes Scholars (Cody Rhodes and Damien Sandow) by pinfall	Tag team match	04:07
2	Alberto Del Rio (c) (with Ricardo Rodriguez) defeated Big Show by submission	Singles match for the World Heavyweight Championship	13:05
3	Antonio Cesaro (c) defeated The Miz by disqualification	Singles match for the WWE United States Championship	08:21
4	Jack Swagger (with Zeb Colter) defeated Randy Orton, Chris Jericho, Mark Henry, Kane, and Daniel Bryan	Elimination Chamber match for a World Heavyweight Championship match at WrestleMania 29	31:18
5	The Shield (Dean Ambrose, Roman Reigns, and Seth Rollins) defeated John Cena, Ryback, and Sheamus by pinfall	Six-man tag team match	14:49
6	Dolph Ziggler (with AJ Lee and Big E Langston) defeated Kofi Kingston by pinfall	Singles match	03:55
7	Kaitlyn (c) defeated Tamina Snuka by pinfall	Singles match for the WWE Divas Championship	03:15
8	The Rock (c) defeated CM Punk (with Paul Heyman) by pinfall	Singles match for the WWE Championship; Had The Rock been counted out or disqualified, he would have lost the title.	20:55
(c) / – the champion(s) heading into the match; P / – the match was broadcast on the pre-show

=== Elimination Chamber entrances and eliminations ===
Eliminated	Wrestler	Entered	Eliminated by	Method	Time
1	Daniel Bryan	2	Mark Henry	Pinfall	16:35
2	Kane	4	Mark Henry	Pinfall	18:21
3	Mark Henry	6	Randy Orton	Pinfall	23:20
4	Chris Jericho	1	Randy Orton	Pinfall	31:11
5	Randy Orton	5	Jack Swagger	Pinfall	31:18
Winner	Jack Swagger	3			31:18
