= Elimination Chamber (2017) =

WWE pay-per-view and livestreaming event

- Promotional poster featuring John Cena inside of the Elimination Chamber structure
- Promotion: WWE
- Brand: SmackDown
- Date: February 12, 2017
- City: Phoenix, Arizona
- Venue: Talking Stick Resort Arena
- Attendance: 11,000

WWE event chronology
← Previous; Royal Rumble	Next → Fastlane

Elimination Chamber chronology
← Previous; 2015	Next → 2018

The 2017 Elimination Chamber (known as No Escape in Germany) was a professional wrestling pay-per-view (PPV) and livestreaming event produced by WWE, held exclusively for wrestlers from the promotion's main roster brand, SmackDown. It was the seventh Elimination Chamber event and took place on February 12, 2017, at the Talking Stick Resort Arena in Phoenix, Arizona. The event centered on the men's Elimination Chamber match, a type of roofed steel cage that surrounds the ring and ringside area with no disqualifications; the objective is to eliminate all other opponents either by pinfall or submission with championship implications at stake.

Eight matches were contested at the event, including one on the Kickoff pre-show. Only one Elimination Chamber match was held, which was the main event that saw Bray Wyatt win the WWE Championship, the first singles championship of his career; he eliminated defending champion John Cena before lastly eliminating AJ Styles. In other prominent matches, Naomi defeated Alexa Bliss to win the SmackDown Women's Championship, marking her first championship in WWE, Randy Orton defeated Luke Harper, American Alpha (Chad Gable and Jason Jordan) retained the SmackDown Tag Team Championship in a tag team turmoil match, and in the opening bout, Becky Lynch defeated Mickie James.

This was the first Elimination Chamber event to be held since 2015, which returned the event to its regular February slot after that 2015 event was held in May. This was also WWE's first PPV and livestreaming event to feature three women's matches on the main card. The event also saw the debut of a new Elimination Chamber structure that became its standard design. This was also the first Elimination Chamber event held since the reintroduction of the brand extension in July 2016, as well as the first to be brand-exclusive for either brand split period. The first two events in 2010 and 2011 had featured wrestlers from both Raw and SmackDown as brand-exclusive PPV events during the first brand split were discontinued in April 2007, and then the first brand split ended in August 2011. This was also the last Elimination Chamber event held before a women's version of the Elimination Chamber match was introduced the following year.

== Production ==
=== Background ===
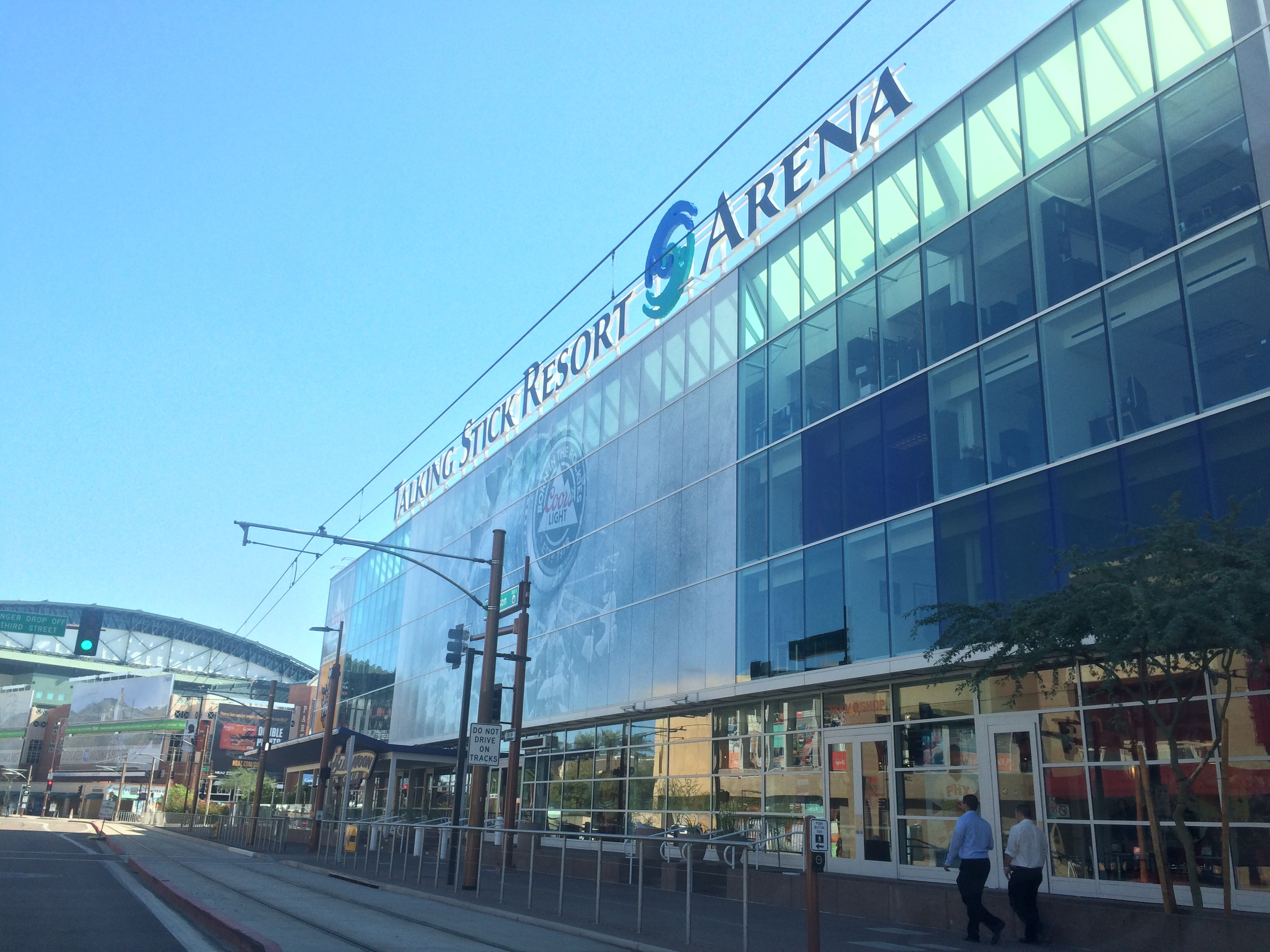
The seventh Elimination Chamber event was held at the Talking Stick Resort Arena in Phoenix, Arizona.

Elimination Chamber is a professional wrestling event first produced by WWE in 2010. It was originally broadcast exclusively via pay-per-view (PPV) before it began simultaneously livestreaming on the WWE Network in 2015. The concept of the event is that one or two main event matches are contested inside the Elimination Chamber, either with championships or future opportunities at championships at stake. The event had been held annually until 2016. That year, an event was not scheduled, however, on November 29, 2016, WWE reinstated the event for 2017, and announced that it would take place at the Talking Stick Resort Arena in Phoenix, Arizona. After the 2015 event was held in May, on December 5, it was announced that the seventh Elimination Chamber event would return to its regular February slot, taking place on February 12. Tickets went on sale on December 16, 2016, through Ticketmaster.

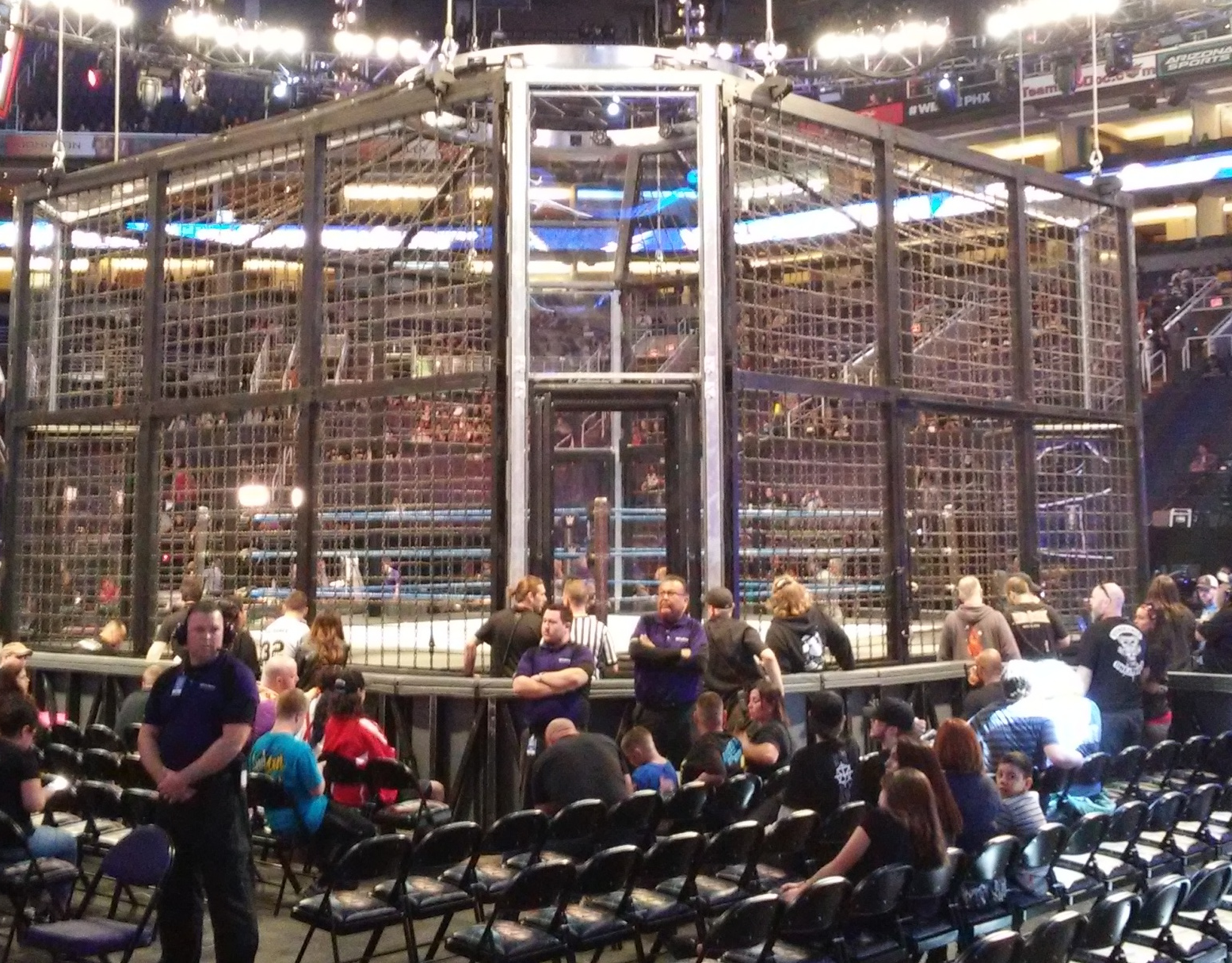
The redesigned Elimination Chamber structure introduced at the event.

The Elimination Chamber match is an elimination-based match contested in a type of large roofed steel cage that surrounds the wrestling ring with an elevated platform around the ring. Within the Chamber are four inner pods, one behind each ring post. The match is contested by six participants. Two wrestlers start the match, while the other four are held within each inner pod with one selected randomly to enter the match at regular intervals, which continues until all four have been released. The objective is to eliminate all other opponents by pinfall or submission, and there are no disqualifications or count-outs. The 2017 event also saw a redesign of the chamber structure, becoming slightly smaller and square in design, instead of circular.

Following the reintroduction of the brand extension in July, where WWE again split its main roster into two brands, Raw and SmackDown, where wrestlers were exclusively assigned to perform, brand-exclusive PPV events were also reinstated, which had been discontinued during the first brand split after WrestleMania 23 in April 2007. As a result, the 2017 Elimination Chamber event was held exclusively for SmackDown, which made it the first brand-exclusive Elimination Chamber event, as the first two events in 2010 and 2011 featured wrestlers from both brands before the original brand extension ended in August 2011.

In 2011 and since 2013, the show has been promoted as "No Escape" in Germany as it was feared that the name "Elimination Chamber" may remind people of the gas chambers used during the Holocaust; it was promoted as "No Way Out" in 2010 and 2012.

=== Storylines ===
The event comprised eight matches, including one on the Kickoff pre-show, that resulted from scripted storylines. Results were predetermined by WWE's writers on the SmackDown brand, while storylines were produced on WWE's weekly television show, SmackDown Live.

On the January 17, 2017, episode of SmackDown, commissioner Shane McMahon scheduled an Elimination Chamber match for the WWE Championship as the main event of Elimination Chamber. At the Royal Rumble on January 29, John Cena defeated AJ Styles to win the WWE Championship for a record thirteenth time, as well as tying Ric Flair's record of sixteen recognized world titles. The following day, Styles was added to the Elimination Chamber match. On the January 31 episode of SmackDown, McMahon and General Manager Daniel Bryan assured Styles that he would eventually get a one-on-one rematch, before revealing the other participants in the Elimination Chamber match: Intercontinental Champion Dean Ambrose, The Miz, Baron Corbin, and Bray Wyatt. Royal Rumble winner Randy Orton warned Cena that if he is still champion after Elimination Chamber, he will take the title from him at WrestleMania 33. Orton and Wyatt then faced Cena and Luke Harper, who had been at odds with Orton ever since they lost the tag team titles; Orton and Wyatt won the match when Orton pinned Cena. Later that night, Styles faced Ambrose with The Miz on commentary. Corbin came out during the match and joined on commentary, but eventually attacked Miz. Ambrose attacked both Corbin and Miz before re-entering the ring, allowing Styles to defeat him. The following week, Ambrose, Corbin, Miz, and Styles had a fatal four-way match that Corbin won by pinning Styles. Later, Orton faced Cena. During the match, Harper came out and attacked Wyatt. Orton attempted an RKO on Harper but was surprised by Cena with an Attitude Adjustment and a win for Cena; Orton was scheduled to face Harper at Elimination Chamber.

At Survivor Series on November 20, 2016, Nikki Bella was originally the captain of Team SmackDown's women's team, but before the match, she was attacked backstage and was unable to compete; Natalya, who was the team's coach, replaced Nikki in the match. On the following SmackDown, Nikki accused Carmella of being the attacker, since the two had been feuding for the few months prior, and the two faced each other at TLC: Tables, Ladders & Chairs on December 4 in a no disqualification match that Nikki won. After the match, Carmella claimed that Natalya was the attacker. For the next couple of weeks, Natalya denied the accusation until the December 20 episode of SmackDown, where she admitted to being the attacker due to pent up jealousy of the Bella Twins, believing they had everything handed to them. The two went back and forth at each other over the next few weeks and were involved in the six-woman tag team match at the Royal Rumble, where Nikki's team defeated Natalya's. On the January 31 episode of SmackDown, Daniel Bryan scheduled a match between Nikki and Natalya at Elimination Chamber to settle their differences. The following week, the two traded barbs with one another, and afterwards on Talking Smack, Natalya attacked Nikki.

On the December 20, 2016, episode of SmackDown, Becky Lynch, disguised as newcomer La Luchadora, defeated SmackDown Women's Champion Alexa Bliss in a non-title match when she made the champion submit to the Dis-arm-her; after the match, Lynch unmasked herself. Over the next few weeks, a villainous La Luchadora began to aid Bliss in matches against Lynch, including Bliss's successful title defense in a Steel Cage match in the main event of the January 17 episode, where La Luchadora was unmasked as the returning Mickie James. The following week, James explained that she became forgotten due to the Women's Revolution; Lynch then came out, but was ambushed by Bliss and James. Also, on the January 24 episode of SmackDown, Naomi was set to face Natalya, but the match was canceled after Nikki Bella attacked Natalya backstage. Naomi then made an open challenge. Bliss came out, not to accept the challenge, but to belittle Naomi. All four women then competed in the six-woman tag team match at the Royal Rumble, where Lynch and Naomi's team defeated Bliss and James' team after Naomi pinned Bliss. The four were then involved in a regular tag team match on the following episode of SmackDown, where Naomi again pinned Bliss. Afterwards on Talking Smack, Bliss was scheduled to defend the SmackDown Women's Championship against Naomi at Elimination Chamber. On February 7, a match between Lynch and James was scheduled for Elimination Chamber. On that night's episode of SmackDown, the four women had a contract signing for their respective matches that ended in a brawl with Naomi and Lynch getting the upper hand.

On the December 13, 2016, episode of SmackDown, a battle royal to determine the number one contenders for the SmackDown Tag Team Championship was won by The Hype Bros (Zack Ryder and Mojo Rawley). After the match, however, it was discovered that Ryder had injured his knee and required surgery. In response, a championship fatal four-way tag team elimination match occurred on the December 27 episode between American Alpha (Chad Gable and Jason Jordan), Heath Slater and Rhyno, The Usos (Jey Uso and Jimmy Uso), and defending champions The Wyatt Family (represented by Luke Harper and Randy Orton), where American Alpha won by last eliminating Orton to become the new champions. The Wyatt Family invoked their rematch clause for the January 10 episode, but American Alpha retained. On the January 31 episode, American Alpha made an open challenge to any tag team on the SmackDown roster. The Usos came out, followed by The Ascension (Konnor and Viktor), The Vaudevillains (Aiden English and Simon Gotch), Breezango (Tyler Breeze and Fandango), and Slater and Rhyno. A brawl ensued where American Alpha and Slater and Rhyno were the last standing. Afterwards on Talking Smack, a championship tag team turmoil match between the six teams was scheduled for Elimination Chamber.

On the December 27, 2016, episode of SmackDown, Dolph Ziggler was unsuccessful in winning the WWE Championship in a triple threat match against Baron Corbin and then-champion AJ Styles. The following week, Ziggler lost to Corbin in a singles match. After the match, Corbin attempted to beat Ziggler with a chair, but Kalisto came to Ziggler's aid and Corbin backed down. Out of anger, Ziggler superkicked Kalisto, stating that he did not need Kalisto's or anyone's help. Backstage, Ziggler trashed the locker room. Apollo Crews tried talking to Ziggler, but Ziggler attacked Crews, turning heel. On the January 10 episode, Kalisto defeated Ziggler. After the match, Ziggler took out his anger on Kalisto, beating him with a chair. Crews came to Kalisto's aid, but was also hit with the chair. The following week, Ziggler appeared in the King's Court with Jerry Lawler to discuss his actions, which ended with Ziggler superkicking Lawler. On the January 24 episode, Ziggler defeated Kalisto. After the match, he again tried to beat Kalisto with a chair, but was instead attacked by Crews. Ziggler defeated Kalisto again the following week, and after the match, he tried removing Kalisto's mask, but Crews made the save. Ziggler then faced Crews on the next episode, where Crews quickly won with a roll up pin. Ziggler then attacked Crews with a chair, but was saved by Kalisto. Backstage, Ziggler claimed that he could beat both Crews and Kalisto at the same time. Daniel Bryan then scheduled Ziggler to face the two in a handicap match at Elimination Chamber.

After some run-ins and the two trading barbs at one another on social media, on February 10, a match between Mojo Rawley and Curt Hawkins was scheduled for the Elimination Chamber Kickoff pre-show.

== Event ==
Other on-screen personnel
Role:	Name:
English commentators	Mauro Ranallo
English commentators	John "Bradshaw" Layfield
English commentators	David Otunga
English commentators	Tom Phillips
Spanish commentators	Carlos Cabrera
Spanish commentators	Marcelo Rodríguez
German commentators	Tim Haber
German commentators	Calvin Knie
Ring announcer	Greg Hamilton
Referees	Danilo Anfibio
Referees	Jason Ayers
Referees	John Cone
Referees	Dan Engler
Referees	Ryan Tran
Referees	Rod Zapata
Backstage interviewers	Renee Young
Backstage interviewers	Dasha Fuentes
Pre-show panel	Renee Young
Pre-show panel	Booker T
Pre-show panel	Sam Roberts
Pre-show panel	Carmella
Talking Smack panel	Renee Young
Talking Smack panel	Daniel Bryan

=== Pre-show ===
During the Elimination Chamber Kickoff pre-show, Mojo Rawley faced Curt Hawkins. Rawley performed a Tilt-A-Whirl Powerslam on Hawkins for the win.

=== Preliminary matches ===
The actual pay-per-view opened with Becky Lynch facing Mickie James. James executed the Mick Kick on Lynch for a delayed near-fall. In the climax, James attempted a Mickie DDT but Lynch countered into a Schoolboy for the win.

Next, Dolph Ziggler faced Apollo Crews and Kalisto in a Handicap match. Before the match, Ziggler attacked Kalisto. Mid-match, Kalisto recovered and returned to the ring. In the end, Kalisto performed a Spin Kick on Ziggler, which was followed by a Delayed Spin Out Powerbomb by Crews to win the match. After the match, Ziggler attacked both men and injured Crews' ankle with a chair.

After that, American Alpha defended the SmackDown Tag Team Championship in a tag team turmoil match. Heath Slater and Rhyno and Breezango began the match. Breezango were eliminated after Rhyno performed a Gore on Fandango. The Vaudevillians entered the match next, but were quickly eliminated when Slater pinned Aiden English after a Smash Hit. The Usos came in next and eliminated Slater and Rhyno when Jimmy performed a Superkick on Slater. American Alpha, the reigning champions, entered next and eliminated The Usos when Gable pinned Jey with a Schoolboy. The Usos then attacked American Alpha before being escorted out by officials. The Ascension, the final team to enter the match, executed the Fall of Man on Jordan, but Gable broke up the pinfall. Gable and Jordan performed the Grand Amplitude on Viktor to retain the titles.

In the fourth match, Nikki Bella fought Natalya. Natalya applied the Sharpshooter, but Nikki countered into The Fearless Lock, with Natalya touching the ring ropes. Natalya and Nikki fought outside of the ring, leading to a double countout. As Natalya was leaving the ring, Nikki attacked her once again until referees separated them. Later, during a backstage segment, Natalya attacked Nikki from behind. During the brawl, Nikki tipped over a make-up table, spilling the powder over herself and Maryse.

In the fifth match, Randy Orton faced Luke Harper. In the climax, as Harper attempted a Discus Clothesline, Orton countered into an RKO to win the match.

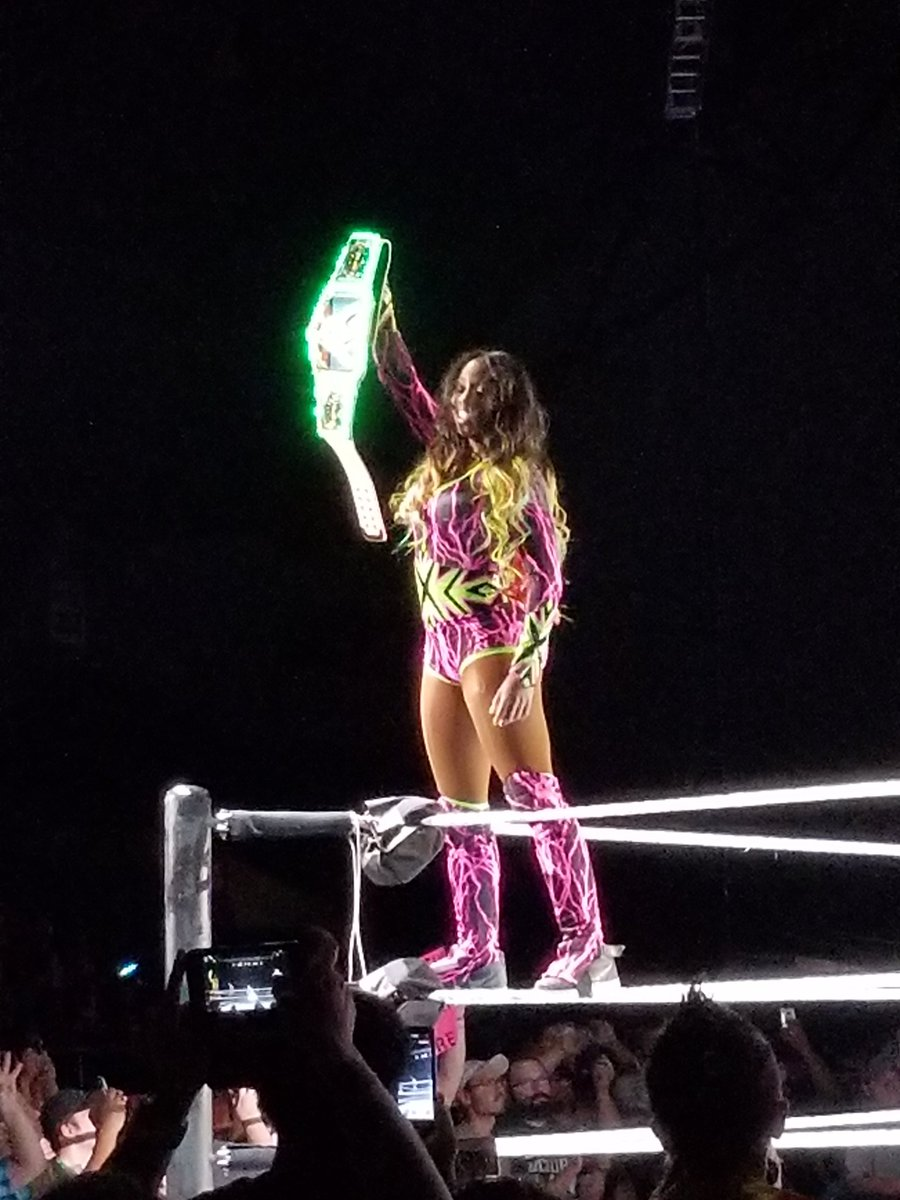
Naomi defeated Alexa Bliss to win the SmackDown Women's Championship, her first championship in WWE.

Next, Alexa Bliss defended the SmackDown Women's Championship against Naomi. As Bliss attempted Twisted Bliss, Naomi countered by raising her knees and executed a Split-Legged Moonsault to win the championship.

=== Main event ===
In the main event, the WWE Championship was defended in the Elimination Chamber match. Defending champion John Cena and AJ Styles were the first two contestants. Intercontinental Champion Dean Ambrose entered next, followed by Bray Wyatt and Baron Corbin. As Miz was due to enter the chamber, he remained in his pod and distracted Corbin, who Ambrose eliminated with a roll-up. However, Corbin attacked Ambrose with a lariat to the back of the head, threw Dean through a pod and performed an End of Days on the Lunatic Fringe before leaving the chamber. Miz then quickly eliminated Ambrose, but was in turn eliminated thanks to Cena after an Attitude Adjustment. Styles and Wyatt attacked Cena before Wyatt attacked Styles. Styles and Cena both scored nearfalls against each other, after a Styles Clash and an Attitude Adjustment respectively. Wyatt then executed Sister Abigail on Cena, eliminating him and guaranteeing a new champion. After a while, as Styles attempted the Phenomenal Forearm, Wyatt caught Styles and executed Sister Abigail to win his first WWE Championship. Randy Orton emerged and the two had a brief staredown before Wyatt celebrated his victory in the ring.

== Aftermath ==
The following episode of SmackDown, John Cena invoked his rematch clause, but AJ Styles also demanded the one-on-one rematch he had been promised. A triple threat match for the WWE Championship occurred and Wyatt retained, despite being attacked by Luke Harper. Afterwards, Royal Rumble winner Randy Orton declared that he would not fight Wyatt for the title at WrestleMania 33 due to his devotion to Wyatt. A 10-man battle royal happened the next week to find a new opponent for Wyatt. Styles, who did not get his promised one-one-one rematch, was the first confirmed entrant. The battle royal ended in a draw after Harper and Styles eliminated each other simultaneously. Styles defeated Harper the following week to become the number one contender, however, Orton betrayed Wyatt and reclaimed his right to face Wyatt at WrestleMania. Due to this confusion, Orton faced Styles on the March 7 episode of SmackDown to determine the decisive number one contender. Orton won the match, confirming that he would face Wyatt at WrestleMania. The following week, an irate Styles attacked Shane McMahon backstage. He was subsequently fired by Daniel Bryan, however, Shane appeared at the end of the show and said he would face Styles in a match at WrestleMania.

Also on the episode following the pay-per-view, Naomi revealed that she had sustained a knee injury during her match with Alexa Bliss, who allowed Naomi one week to heal for a rematch. Mickie James then defeated Becky Lynch in their rematch. On the February 21 episode, Naomi was not cleared to defend her title within 30 days and was forced to vacate the SmackDown Women's Championship. Daniel Bryan then had Bliss face Lynch for the vacant title, which Bliss won. On the March 7 episode, after claiming to be the greatest female wrestler on the SmackDown roster, Daniel Bryan scheduled Bliss to defend the title against all available female wrestlers on SmackDown's roster at WrestleMania 33. James then turned on Bliss after a subsequent tag team match, and James, Lynch, and Natalya were confirmed for the WrestleMania match. Carmella then confirmed that she would be in the WrestleMania match, and Naomi returned on the March 28 episode, confirming she would be in the match, making it a six-pack challenge at WrestleMania.

Also on the episode following the pay-per-view, Dean Ambrose, who had been looking for Baron Corbin, was brutally attacked and hospitalized by Corbin before his match with James Ellsworth. The following week, Ambrose caused Corbin's elimination in the battle royal and Corbin attacked Ambrose with the End of Days. Ambrose called out Corbin over the next couple of weeks, and Corbin challenged Ambrose to a match at WrestleMania 33 for the Intercontinental Championship, which Ambrose accepted. Also in the mid-card, Dolph Ziggler claimed that he would eliminate the new generation of wrestlers. During the number one contender's battle royal, Ziggler eliminated Kalisto, but was in turn eliminated by Apollo Crews. Ziggler took out his anger on Kalisto with a chair, which caused the distracted Crews to be eliminated. Ziggler and Crews then had a chairs match on the February 28 episode that Ziggler won. Crews, Kalisto, and Ziggler were confirmed for the 2017 André the Giant Memorial Battle Royal, along with Mojo Rawley and Curt Hawkins, on the WrestleMania pre-show.

After another backstage brawl, Daniel Bryan scheduled a Falls Count Anywhere match between Nikki Bella and Natalya for the February 21 episode. That episode, Natalya defeated Nikki thanks to help from Maryse, who attacked Nikki. The following week, Nikki's boyfriend John Cena was the guest on Miz TV due to The Miz eliminating Cena in the battle royal the previous week. After Cena insulted Miz, his wife Maryse slapped Cena, and Nikki came out and ran off Maryse along with Miz. The following week, after Cena and Nikki defeated Ellsworth and Carmella, The Miz and Maryse attacked the two. A match pitting Cena and Nikki against Miz and Maryse at WrestleMania was scheduled by Daniel Bryan since Bryan could not face Miz, who had been insulting Bryan for several months.

Also on the episode following the pay-per-view, SmackDown Tag Team Champions American Alpha defeated The Ascension. After the match, The Usos issued a warning to American Alpha, and continued their antagonizing the following week. The Usos defeated American Alpha in a non-title match on the March 14 episode, and subsequently defeated them for the titles the following week, becoming the first team to win both the Raw Tag Team Championship (then known as WWE Tag Team Championship when they held it) and SmackDown Tag Team Championship. Although The Usos wanted to defend their titles at WrestleMania, they were scheduled for the 2017 André the Giant Memorial Battle Royal, along with SmackDown's other tag teams, including American Alpha, Breezango, The Ascension, The Vaudevillains, and Heath Slater and Rhyno.

While the 2017 event was held exclusively for SmackDown, the 2018 event was in turn held exclusively for Raw. The 2018 event also featured the first-ever women's Elimination Chamber match as well as the first-ever seven-man Elimination Chamber match.

== Results ==
No.	Results	Stipulations	Times
1^{P}	Mojo Rawley defeated Curt Hawkins by pinfall	Singles match	8:05
2	Becky Lynch defeated Mickie James by pinfall	Singles match	11:40
3	Apollo Crews and Kalisto defeated Dolph Ziggler by pinfall	Handicap match	7:20
4	American Alpha (Chad Gable and Jason Jordan) (c) won by last eliminating The Ascension (Konnor and Viktor)	Tag team turmoil match for the WWE SmackDown Tag Team Championship	21:10
5	Natalya vs. Nikki Bella ended in a double countout	Singles match	13:40
6	Randy Orton defeated Luke Harper by pinfall	Singles match	17:15
7	Naomi defeated Alexa Bliss (c) by pinfall	Singles match for the WWE SmackDown Women's Championship	8:20
8	Bray Wyatt defeated John Cena (c), AJ Styles, The Miz, Dean Ambrose, and Baron Corbin	Elimination Chamber match for the WWE Championship	34:20
(c) / – the champion(s) heading into the match; P / – the match was broadcast on the pre-show

=== Tag Team Turmoil match ===
Eliminated	Team	Entered	Eliminated by	Method	Time
1	Breezango (Tyler Breeze and Fandango)	2	Heath Slater and Rhyno	Pinfall	4:35
2	The Vaudevillains (Aiden English and Simon Gotch)	3	Heath Slater and Rhyno	Pinfall	6:45
3	Heath Slater and Rhyno	1	The Usos (Jey Uso and Jimmy Uso)	Pinfall	9:45
4	The Usos (Jey Uso and Jimmy Uso)	4	American Alpha (Chad Gable and Jason Jordan)	Pinfall	15:20
5	The Ascension (Konnor and Viktor)	6	American Alpha (Chad Gable and Jason Jordan)	Pinfall	21:10
Winner	American Alpha (Chad Gable and Jason Jordan) (c)	5	—N/a		21:10

=== Elimination Chamber match ===
Eliminated	Wrestler	Entered	Eliminated by	Method	Time
1	Baron Corbin	5	Dean Ambrose	Roll-up	18:35
2	Dean Ambrose	3	The Miz	End Of Days	20:42
3	The Miz	6	John Cena	Attitude Adjustment	23:25
4	John Cena (c)	1	Bray Wyatt	Sister Abigail	29:00
5	AJ Styles	2	Bray Wyatt	Sister Abigail	34:20
Winner	Bray Wyatt	4			

After Corbin was eliminated he attacked Ambrose
