= WWE New Year's Revolution =

Professional wrestling event series

- WWE New Year's Revolution 2005 logo
- Promotion: WWE
- Brands: Raw (2005–2007, 2020, 2027); SmackDown (2020, 2024, 2027)
- First event: 2005
- Signature match: Elimination Chamber match (2005–2006)

WWE New Year's Revolution is a professional wrestling event produced by WWE, a professional wrestling promotion based in Connecticut. The event was created in 2005 and its name is a play on the Western tradition of New Year's resolutions, being held in early January each year the event is produced.

It was originally held as a pay-per-view (PPV) event from 2005 to 2007. To coincide with WWE's brand extension, New Year's Revolution was held exclusively for wrestlers from the Raw brand for its three years as a PPV event. In 2008, New Year's Revolution was removed from the schedule when the company reduced the number of PPVs per year after the discontinuation of brand-exclusive PPVs following WrestleMania 23 in April 2007. In January 2020, WWE revived the event's name for a series of WWE Live shows for Raw and SmackDown titled the New Year's Revolution Tour; this tour was not held in 2021 due to the COVID-19 pandemic. The name was used again for a special episode of Friday Night SmackDown on January 5, 2024.

The PPV event was notable for featuring the Elimination Chamber match during its first two years. Also notable was the 2006 event, which saw the first Money in the Bank cash-in match. After John Cena had retained the WWE Championship in an Elimination Chamber match, Edge used his Money in the Bank contract and defeated Cena to win the championship.

== History ==
New Year's Revolution was an annual January pay-per-view (PPV) event produced by World Wrestling Entertainment (WWE). The name was a play on the Western tradition of New Year's resolutions. The first New Year's Revolution took place on January 9, 2005, and aired live on PPV from San Juan, Puerto Rico, which was the first PPV event produced by WWE to be held in Puerto Rico. The main event was an Elimination Chamber match, a special elimination-based professional wrestling match type that was promoted on rare occasions in WWE at that time with a total of six participants. The original Elimination Chamber structure was 16-feet-high and weighed 10-tons. It was composed of two miles of chain, steel grating, and plexiglass pods (two wrestlers started the match while the other four were contained in the pods with one each let into the match at random every five minutes).

The 2006 event also featured an Elimination Chamber match as the main event, which also saw the first Money in the Bank cash-in, where Mr. Money in the Bank Edge used the contract and defeated WWE Champion John Cena right after Cena had retained the title in the Elimination Chamber match. The annual Elimination Chamber match was then moved to the December to Dismember PPV later that year, thus the 2007 New Year's Revolution event did not feature the Elimination Chamber match. The New Year's Revolution PPV was then canceled in 2008, after WWE reduced the number of PPVs per year after the discontinuation of brand-exclusive PPVs following WrestleMania 23 in April 2007.

In 2002, WWE held a draft that split its roster into two distinctive brands of wrestling, Raw and SmackDown, where wrestlers were exclusively assigned to perform. New Year's Revolution was produced exclusively for wrestlers of the Raw brand all three years the PPV was held. In April 2011, the promotion ceased using its full name with the "WWE" abbreviation becoming an orphaned initialism.

In January 2020, after 13 years since the 2007 PPV, WWE revived the New Year's Revolution name for a series of WWE Live shows called the New Year's Revolution Tour, which were held as supershows, featuring wrestlers from both Raw and SmackDown. The tour began on January 4 and was scheduled for a total of nine shows. The tour was cut short as the ninth and final show, which was scheduled for March 15, had to be canceled due to the onset of the COVID-19 pandemic just a few days beforehand. The pandemic caused WWE to suspend its live touring schedule until July 2021, thus a New Year's Revolution Tour was not held that year.

While not part of the New Year's Revolution chronology, WWE reintroduced a New Year's-themed event, which took place as the January 6, 2021, episode of NXT entitled New Year's Evil, a name previously used by former rival World Championship Wrestling for a December 1999 episode of Nitro. WWE also produced a 2022 pay-per-view event called Day 1, which unlike New Year's Revolution, it took place on New Year's Day itself, and it was WWE's first PPV and livestreaming event to take place on New Year's Day.

During the December 22, 2023, episode of SmackDown, the brand's General Manager Nick Aldis announced the revival of New Year's Revolution. It was scheduled to be held as a special episode of SmackDown on January 5, 2024, in Vancouver, British Columbia, Canada. This in turn marked the first SmackDown-branded New Year's Revolution, the first to air as a television special, and the fourth overall to be broadcast on any outlet. It was also the final event in WWE's New Year's Knockout Week, a week-long programming of New Year's-themed shows.

== Reception ==
The 2005 event never reached Billboard.com's top ten list for Recreational Sports DVDs. The first week the event appeared on the Billboard chart, it ranked 19th. The following week, the event ranked 17th, only to drop off the chart the next week. The 2006 event ranked third on its first week in the chart's top ten list. The following week, the DVD reached second on the list, and remained in the top ten for five weeks until the week of April 8, 2006, when the event dropped to 11th. The 2007 event ranked second in its first week in the top ten. The DVD remained in the top ten for four weeks until the week of March 31, 2007, when it ranked 11th.

Canadian Online Explorer's professional wrestling section rated the 2005 event a three out of ten stars. The main event was rated a seven out of ten stars. The 2006 event was given a rating of three out of ten stars also, with the main event being rated six out of ten stars. The 2007 event was rated six out of ten stars, the highest for the PPV's three-year run. The main event for 2007 was given a six out of ten stars rating, the same as the previous year's main event.

== Events ==
=== Pay-per-view and televised events (2005–2007, 2024, 2027) ===
As a pay-per-view event, only three New Year's Revolutions were held, beginning in 2005 with the final in 2007. All three events were held exclusively for wrestlers from the Raw brand. The 2024 event was a SmackDown-exclusive show as it was held as a television special episode of SmackDown.

Raw-branded event	SmackDown-branded event

#	Event	Date	City	Venue	Main event	Ref.
1	New Year's Revolution (2005)	January 9, 2005	San Juan, Puerto Rico	José Miguel Agrelot Coliseum	Triple H vs. Batista vs. Randy Orton vs. Chris Jericho vs. Chris Benoit vs. Edge in an Elimination Chamber match for the vacant World Heavyweight Championship with Shawn Michaels as the special guest referee	
2	New Year's Revolution (2006)	January 8, 2006	Albany, New York	Pepsi Arena	John Cena (c) vs. Carlito vs. Chris Masters vs. Kane vs. Kurt Angle vs. Shawn Michaels in an Elimination Chamber match for the WWE Championship, then John Cena (c) vs. Edge for the WWE Championship in Edge's Money in the Bank cash-in match	
3	New Year's Revolution (2007)	January 7, 2007	Kansas City, Missouri	Kemper Arena	John Cena (c) vs. Umaga for the WWE Championship	
4	New Year's Revolution (2024)	January 5, 2024	Vancouver, British Columbia, Canada	Rogers Arena	LA Knight vs. AJ Styles vs. Randy Orton to determine the #1 contender for the Undisputed WWE Universal Championship at Royal Rumble	
5	New Year's Revolution (2027)	January 2, 2027	TBA	TBA	TBA	
(c) – refers to the champion(s) heading into the match

=== New Year's Revolution Tour (2020) ===
The New Year's Revolution Tour was originally scheduled to be a tour of nine WWE Live shows, however, the final show was canceled due to the onset of the COVID-19 pandemic. The ninth and final show had been scheduled to be held on March 15 at the Covelli Centre in Youngstown, Ohio, but Ohio governor Mike DeWine issued a ban of mass gatherings of over 100 people or more. Below are the eight shows that were held for the 2020 tour. These house shows were held as supershows, featuring wrestlers from both Raw and SmackDown.

#	Date	City	Venue	Main event	Ref.
1	January 4	Cape Girardeau, Missouri	Show Me Center	Roman Reigns, Braun Strowman, and Big E vs. King Corbin and The Revival (Scott Dawson and Dash Wilder)	
2	January 5	Springfield, Missouri	JQH Arena	Roman Reigns, Braun Strowman, and The New Day (Big E and Kofi Kingston) vs. King Corbin, Shinsuke Nakamura, and The Revival (Scott Dawson and Dash Wilder)	
3	January 11	Dayton, Ohio	Nutter Center	Roman Reigns vs. King Corbin in a Loser Eats Dog Food match	
4	January 12	Corbin, Kentucky	The Corbin Arena	Roman Reigns vs. King Corbin in a Loser Eats Dog Food match	
5	February 8	Oakland, California	Oakland Arena	Roman Reigns vs. King Corbin	
6	February 9	Fresno, California	Save Mart Center	Drew McIntyre vs. Seth Rollins	
7	February 15	Eugene, Oregon	Matthew Knight Arena	Roman Reigns vs. King Corbin	
8	February 16	Kennewick, Washington	Toyota Center	Roman Reigns vs. King Corbin	

== See also ==
- List of WWE pay-per-view events
- WWE Elimination Chamber
- Elimination Chamber
