= New Year's Revolution (2024) =

WWE television special

SmackDown: New Year's Revolution
- SmackDown: New Year's Revolution poster
- Promotion: WWE
- Brand: SmackDown
- Date: January 5, 2024
- City: Vancouver, British Columbia, Canada
- Venue: Rogers Arena
- Attendance: 13,157

SmackDown special episodes chronology
← Previous; Friday Night SmackDown Season 2 Premiere	Next → SmackDown in Mexico City special

New Year's Revolution chronology
← Previous; 2007	Next → 2027

The 2024 New Year's Revolution, promoted as SmackDown: New Year's Revolution, was a professional wrestling television special produced by the American company WWE, held for wrestlers from the promotion's main roster brand, SmackDown. It was the fourth Annual New Year's Revolution and aired as a special episode of the weekly series Friday Night SmackDown on Fox. It took place on January 5, 2024, at the Rogers Arena in Vancouver, British Columbia, Canada.

This broadcast concluded WWE's week-long programming of New Year's-themed shows called New Year's Knockout Week, which included Raw: Day 1 on January 1 and NXT: New Year's Evil on January 2. New Year's Revolution was previously held as a Raw-exclusive pay-per-view (PPV) event from 2005 to 2007, in turn making this the first SmackDown-branded New Year's Revolution and the first to air as a television special. It was also the first to be broadcast on any outlet since the 2007 event, albeit in January 2020, a series of eight WWE Live shows titled the New Year's Revolution Tour was held, but these were dual-branded non-televised events.

Four matches were contested during the live broadcast. In the main event, a triple threat match between Randy Orton, LA Knight, and AJ Styles was held to determine who would challenge Roman Reigns for the Undisputed WWE Universal Championship at the Royal Rumble; however, the match ended in a no contest after The Bloodline (Reigns, Jimmy Uso, and Solo Sikoa) attacked all three competitors. As a result, Reigns was instead scheduled to defend the title against the three in a fatal four-way match at the Royal Rumble. In another prominent match, which opened the show, Kevin Owens defeated Santos Escobar in the finals of a tournament to earn a match against Logan Paul for the United States Championship at the Royal Rumble. The broadcast also marked the return of Authors of Pain (Akam and Rezar with manager Paul Ellering); their last WWE televised appearance was in March 2020 before being released in September that year.

== Production ==
=== Background ===
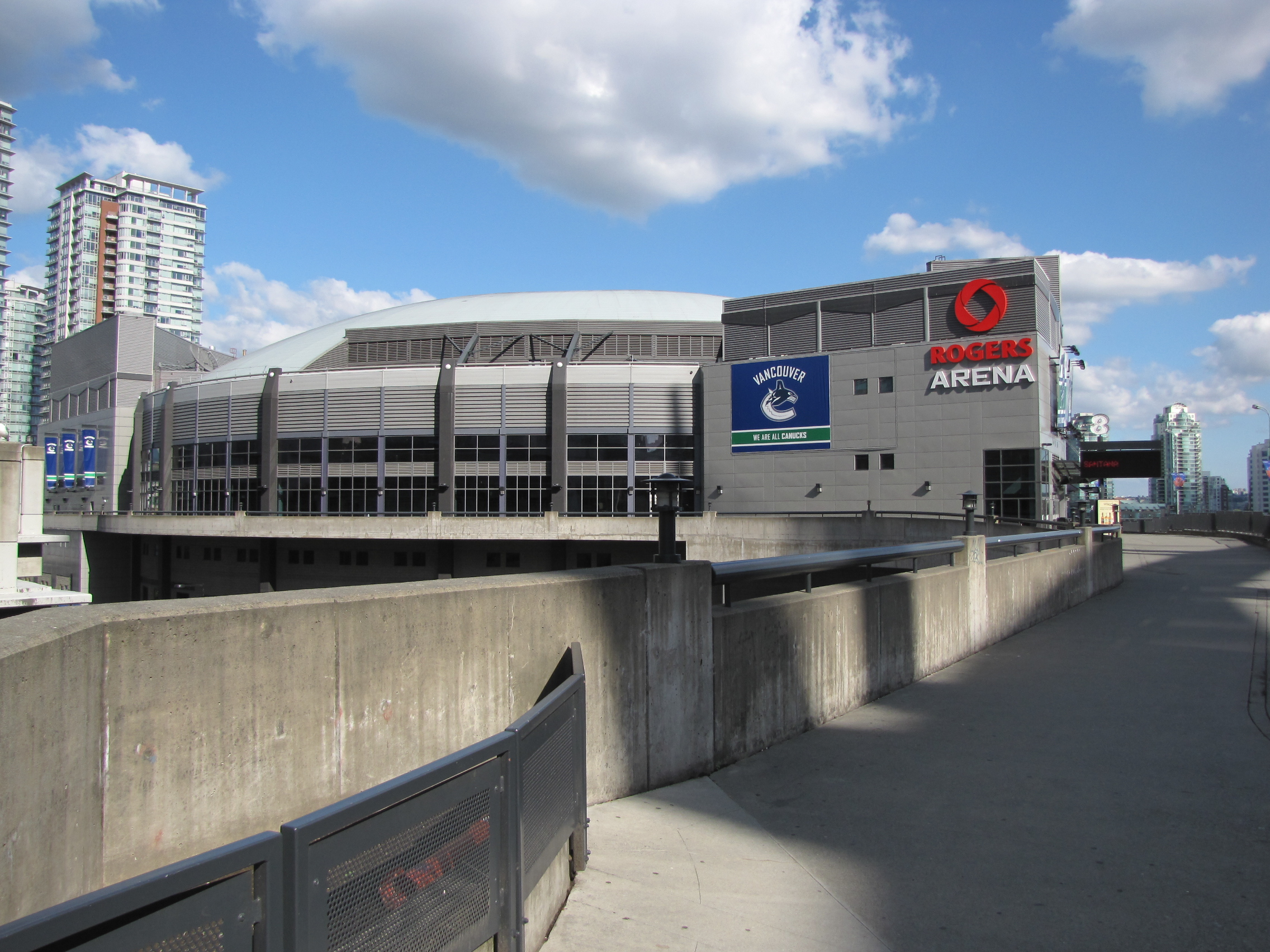
The fourth televised New Year's Revolution was held at the Rogers Arena in Vancouver, British Columbia, Canada.

From 2005 to 2007, the American professional wrestling promotion WWE held an annual pay-per-view (PPV) event in early January titled New Year's Revolution, which was held exclusively for wrestlers from the promotion's Raw brand division. The name of the event was a play on the Western tradition of New Year's resolutions. It was then discontinued as after WrestleMania 23 in April 2007, WWE ceased producing brand-exclusive PPVs, thus reducing the amount of PPVs held per year. The 2007 event would in turn be the final New Year's Revolution to broadcast on any outlet, as although WWE revived the name for a series of eight WWE Live shows in early 2020 titled the New Year's Revolution Tour, these were non-televised events.

During the December 22, 2023, episode of Friday Night SmackDown, the brand's General Manager Nick Aldis announced the revival of New Year's Revolution. It was scheduled to be held as a special episode of SmackDown on January 5, 2024, at the Rogers Arena in Vancouver, British Columbia, Canada and broadcast on Fox. This in turn marked the first SmackDown-branded New Year's Revolution, the first to air as a television special, and the fourth overall to air on any broadcasting outlet. The show also concluded WWE's week-long programming of New Year's-themed shows called New Year's Knockout Week, which included Raw: Day 1 on January 1 and NXT: New Year's Evil on January 2.

=== Storylines ===
The event included four matches that resulted from scripted storylines. Results were predetermined by WWE's writers on the SmackDown brand, while storylines were produced on WWE's weekly television show, Friday Night SmackDown.

On the November 17, 2023, episode of SmackDown, Zelina Vega and "Michin" Mia Yim were attacked by Damage CTRL (Bayley, Iyo Sky, Dakota Kai, Asuka, and Kairi Sane) after they talked to Bianca Belair, who was attempting to find a fourth member for her team for the WarGames match at Survivor Series: WarGames. Three weeks later, before Asuka's match against Charlotte Flair, the team of Vega, Yim, Belair, and Shotzi attacked the rest of Damage CTRL. Two weeks later, the team of Vega, Yim, Belair, and Shotzi defeated Damage CTRL in a Holiday Havoc match, where Yim pinned Sky, granting her a match against Sky for the WWE Women's Championship at New Year's Revolution.

At Crown Jewel on November 4, 2023, Logan Paul won his first WWE title, the United States Championship. Paul made his first appearance as champion on the December 1 episode of SmackDown where he announced that his first challenger would be determined by a tournament. Kevin Owens and Santos Escobar won their respective tournament brackets, and on the December 22 episode, it was announced that the tournament final between the two would occur at New Year's Revolution with the winner facing Paul for the title at the Royal Rumble.

Before he went on hiatus in May 2022 due to a back injury, Randy Orton had been feuding with The Bloodline (Roman Reigns, Jey Uso, and Jimmy Uso). At Crown Jewel on November 4, 2023, Reigns defeated LA Knight to retain the Undisputed WWE Universal Championship after interference from The Bloodline. On the following episode of SmackDown, Knight stated that he was not done with The Bloodline until he defeated Reigns for the title. Orton then returned at Survivor Series: WarGames later that month, and he subsequently signed with the SmackDown brand after fending off an attack by The Bloodline (which had since added Solo Sikoa while Jey left the group earlier in the summer) on the December 1 episode of SmackDown, vowing to get revenge. Two weeks later, the returning AJ Styles helped Knight and Orton fend off The Bloodline before attacking Knight. The following week, Styles explained that he attacked Knight for taking his spot in a tag team match at Fastlane. After Orton interrupted, he said he also wanted a title match against Reigns. SmackDown General Manager Nick Aldis then announced that Orton, Styles, and Knight would compete in a triple threat match at New Year's Revolution, where the winner would face Reigns for the Undisputed WWE Universal Championship at the Royal Rumble.

On the November 24, 2023, episode of SmackDown during a tag team match between The Brawling Brutes (Butch and Ridge Holland) and Pretty Deadly (Elton Prince and Kit Wilson), Holland left the ringside area, costing his team the match. Over the next few weeks, Butch feuded with Pretty Deadly by himself. On the December 22 episode of SmackDown, Butch attacked Pretty Deadly backstage after they mocked him. SmackDown General Manager Nick Aldis then told Butch to find a partner to take on Pretty Deadly at New Year's Revolution.

== Results ==
No.	Results	Stipulations	Times
1^{D}	Gable Steveson defeated Cedric Alexander	Singles match	6:07
2	Kevin Owens defeated Santos Escobar by pinfall	Tournament final to determine the #1 contender for the WWE United States Championship at the Royal Rumble	16:35
3	Iyo Sky (c) defeated Michin by pinfall	Singles match for the WWE Women's Championship	10:40
4	Butch and Tyler Bate defeated Pretty Deadly (Kit Wilson and Elton Prince) by pinfall	Tag team match	8:34
5	Randy Orton vs. AJ Styles vs. LA Knight ended in a no contest	Triple threat match to determine the #1 contender for the Undisputed WWE Universal Championship at the Royal Rumble	19:40
6^{D}	Bianca Belair defeated Chelsea Green	Singles match	—
7^{D}	Rhea Ripley (c) defeated Ivy Nile	Singles match for the Women’s World Championship	—
8^{D}	Drew McIntyre defeated Ricochet	Singles match	10:25
(c) / – the champion(s) heading into the match; D / – this was a dark match

=== WWE United States Championship #1 Contender Tournament ===
1st Round; SmackDown; December 8–15, 2023
Dragon Lee	9:09
Santos Escobar	Pinfall
Bobby Lashley	Pinfall
Karrion Kross	9:46
Carmelo Hayes	Pinfall
Grayson Waller	10:23
Austin Theory	13:32
Kevin Owens	Pinfall

Semifinals; SmackDown; December 15, 2023 (Aired: December 22)
Santos Escobar	Pinfall
Bobby Lashley	8:44
Carmelo Hayes	10:04
Kevin Owens	Pinfall

Final; SmackDown: New Year's Revolution; January 5, 2024
Santos Escobar	16:35
Kevin Owens	Pinfall

== See also ==
- WWE in Canada
