= New Year's Revolution (2006) =

World Wrestling Entertainment pay-per-view event

- Promotional poster featuring John Cena with the Elimination Chamber structure in the background.
- Promotion: World Wrestling Entertainment
- Brand: Raw
- Date: January 8, 2006
- City: Albany, New York
- Venue: Pepsi Arena
- Attendance: 11,000
- Buy rate: 345,000
- Tagline: The Elimination Chamber; 10 Tons of Steel. 2 Miles of Chain. One Man Left Standing.

Pay-per-view chronology
← Previous; Armageddon	Next → Royal Rumble

New Year's Revolution chronology
← Previous; 2005	Next → 2007

The 2006 New Year's Revolution was a professional wrestling pay-per-view (PPV) event produced by World Wrestling Entertainment (WWE). It was the second annual New Year's Revolution and took place on January 8, 2006, at the Pepsi Arena in Albany, New York, held exclusively for wrestlers from the promotion's Raw brand division.

The main event was an Elimination Chamber match for the WWE Championship involving champion John Cena, Kurt Angle, Shawn Michaels, Kane, Carlito, and Chris Masters. Cena won the match and retained the title after last eliminating Carlito. After the match, Edge cashed in his Money in the Bank contract and defeated Cena to win the WWE Championship, which was the first-ever Money in the Bank cash-in. One of the predominant matches on the card was Triple H versus Big Show, which Triple H won by pinfall after executing a Pedigree. Another primary match on the undercard was Ric Flair versus Edge for Flair's WWE Intercontinental Championship, which Flair won after Edge got himself intentionally disqualified, but he did not win the title as titles do not change hands by a disqualification unless stipulated.

== Production ==
=== Background ===
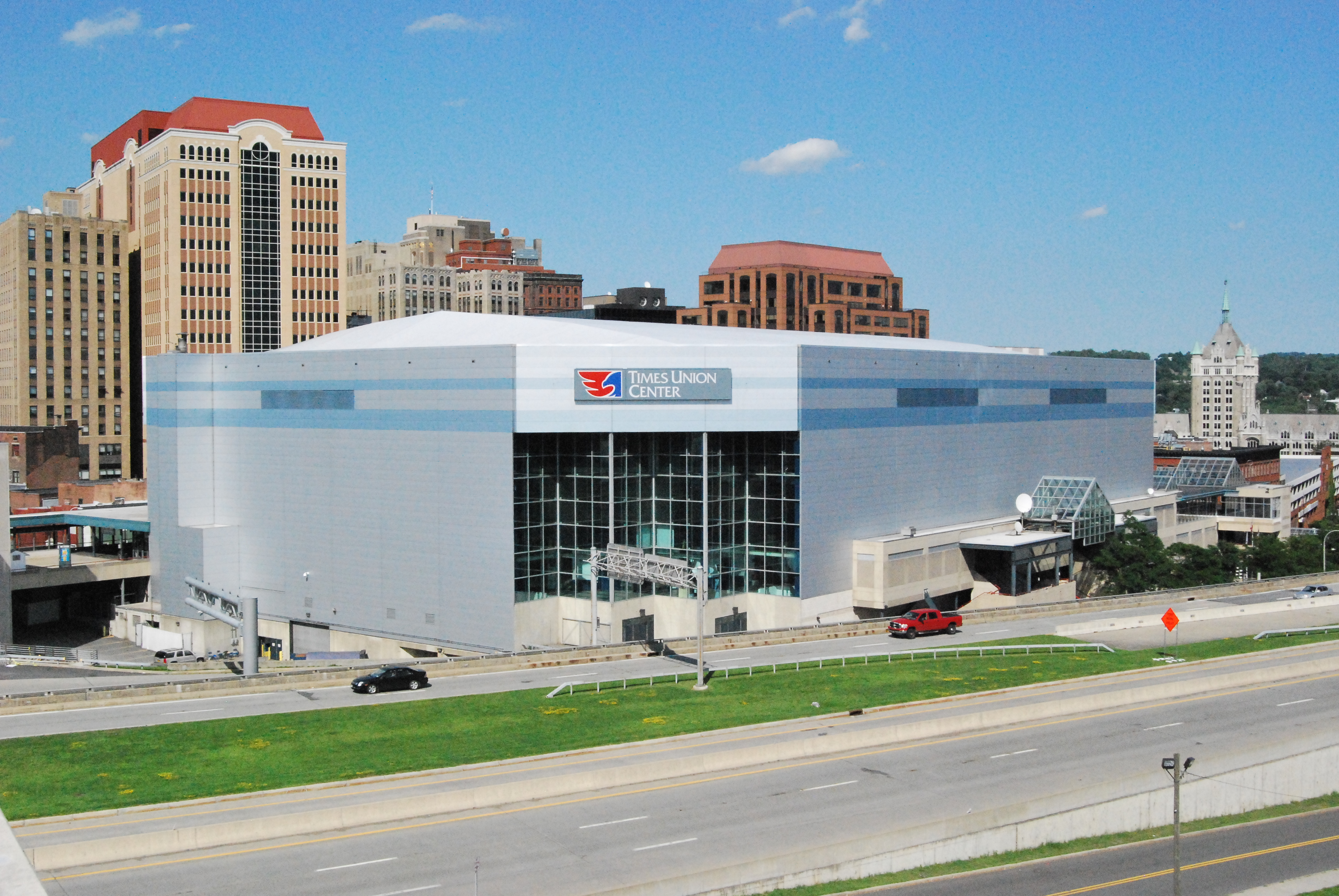
The second annual New Year's Revolution was held at the Pepsi Arena in Albany, New York.

In early January 2005, World Wrestling Entertainment (WWE) produced a professional wrestling pay-per-view (PPV) event entitled New Year's Revolution. The name of the event itself was a play on the Western tradition of New Year's resolutions. A second event was scheduled for January 8, 2006, at the Pepsi Arena in Albany, New York, thus establishing New Year's Revolution as an annual New Year's event for the promotion. Like the previous year, it was held exclusively for wrestlers from the Raw brand.

=== Storylines ===
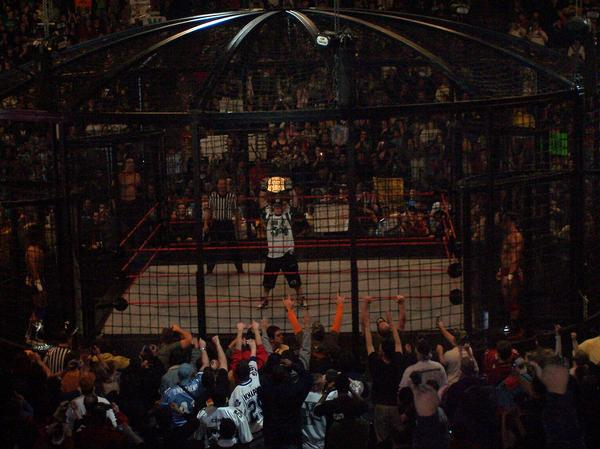
John Cena as WWE Champion

The main feud heading into New Year's Revolution was between John Cena, Kurt Angle, Shawn Michaels, Kane, Carlito, and Chris Masters over the WWE Championship. This feud started on the December 5, 2005, episode of Raw when Eric Bischoff announced an Elimination Chamber match for New Year's Revolution. On December 12, qualifying matches for the Elimination Chamber match occurred. Angle qualified after defeating Ric Flair, Carlito qualified after defeating Shelton Benjamin, Shawn Michaels qualified after defeating the Big Show by disqualification, Chris Masters qualified after defeating Viscera and finally Kane qualified after defeating Triple H with help from his partner Big Show.

The secondary feud heading into the pay-per-view was between Triple H and the Big Show. The rivalry started on the November 28 when Triple H bragged about the destruction of Ric Flair until Show came and confronted him. On the December 12 episode of Raw, Show faced Shawn Michaels in a qualifying match for the Elimination Chamber match until Triple H came down with a steel chair and hit Michaels with the intention of getting Show disqualified. Show was disqualified, so Michaels qualified and was made a part of the Elimination Chamber match. Later that same night, Triple H faced Show's World Tag Team Championship partner Kane in a qualifying match for the Elimination Chamber match. Show interrupted in the match and helped Kane beat Triple H to qualify.

The third feud heading into New Year's Revolution was between Ric Flair and Edge over the WWE Intercontinental Championship. Their rivalry started on the December 5 episode of Raw when Edge's interview segment The Cutting Edge debuted. Edge and Lita insulted Flair so much that it forced Sgt. Slaughter and Michael Hayes to shut down the segment. Edge attacked both men and left them laid into the ring.

== Event ==
Other on-screen personnel
Role:	Name:
English commentators	Joey Styles
English commentators	Jerry Lawler
English commentators	Jonathan Coachman
Spanish commentators	Carlos Cabrera
Spanish commentators	Hugo Savinovich
Interviewers	Todd Grisham
Interviewers	Maria Kanellis
Ring announcer	Lilian Garcia
Referees	Mike Chioda
Referees	Mickie Henson
Referees	Jack Doan
Referees	Chad Patton
Referees	Mark Yeaton

=== Preliminary matches ===
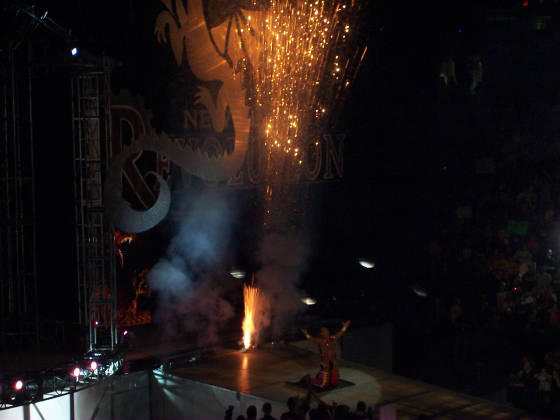
Shawn Michaels performing his entrance.

Before the event went live on pay-per-view, Chavo Guerrero defeated Snitsky in a Heat match.

The opening match was Ric Flair against Edge for Flair's Intercontinental Championship. Flair attempted to apply the figure four leglock on Edge but Lita distracted Flair, leading to Flair applying the Figure Four Leglock on Lita. Edge attacked Flair with his Money in the Bank briefcase, thus being disqualified and losing the match.

In the next match, Trish Stratus faced Mickie James for the WWE Women's Championship. James executed Stratusfaction and then attempted a Mick Kick but Stratus countered with a Chick Kick to retain the title.

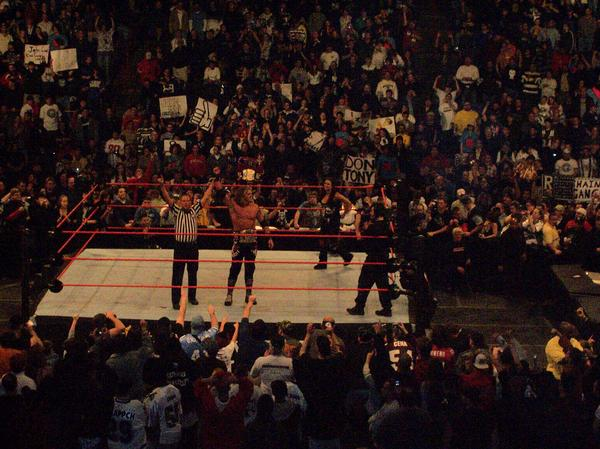
Edge after cashing his Money in the Bank contract and becoming WWE Champion.

The third match was between Jerry Lawler and Gregory Helms. Lawler executed a Diving Fist Drop on Helms to win the match.

In the next match, Triple H faced Big Show. Whilst the referee was down, Triple H hit Big Show with a broken sledgehammer and executed a Pedigree to win.

The fifth match was between Shelton Benjamin and Viscera. Momma Benjamin attacked Viscera with her loaded purse twice and Benjamin performed a dragon whip for the victory.

The sixth match was the first Bra & Panties Gauntlet match. Maria encountered Vince's Devils (Candice Michelle, Victoria, and Torrie Wilson) in the match. Maria faced Candice Michelle and stripped her and Torrie Wilson. Maria was unable to strip Victoria, who instead stripped Maria. The Fabulous Moolah and Mae Young made a surprise appearance, beginning to strip Victoria. When Moolah and Young left, Ashley quickly came to the ring and won the match after removing Victoria's pants.

=== Main event ===
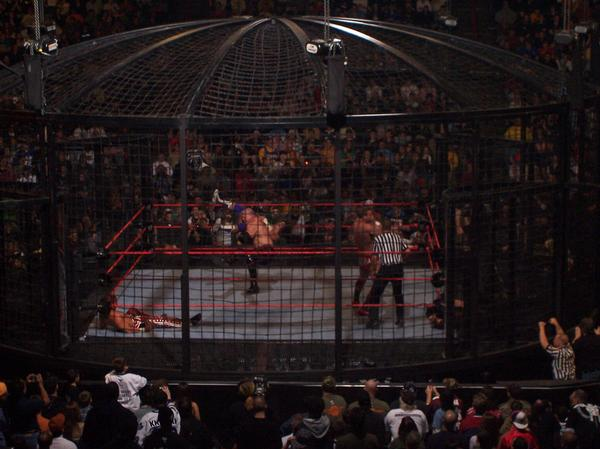
The Elimination Chamber match, with Kane performing a Sidewalk Slam.

In the main event, John Cena faced Shawn Michaels, Kurt Angle, Kane, Carlito and Chris Masters in an Elimination Chamber match for the WWE Championship. Michaels and Cena began the match and Carlito and Angle were the third and fourth entrants. As Angle entered, he suplexed the other three men, catapulted Michaels into the Chamber wall and threw him into a chamber pod. Angle applied the ankle lock on Carlito until Masters entered and attacked Angle. Angle applied the ankle lock on Cena but Michaels performed Sweet Chin Music on Angle to eliminate him. Kane entered the match and executed chokeslams on all the participants. Carlito and Masters formed an alliance, double-teaming Kane to eliminate him. Michaels performed a diving elbow drop and Sweet Chin Music on Cena but Carlito executed a rolling cutter and pinned Michaels to eliminate him. Masters performed a DDT on Cena onto the chamber floor. Carlito and Masters attacked Cena and Carlito ordered Masters to apply the Masterlock on Cena. Masters did so until Carlito turned on Masters, attacking him with a low blow. Carlito rolled up Masters to eliminate him and then Cena rolled up Carlito to win the match and retain the title.

After the match as Cena was attempting to recover, Vince McMahon came out, announcing that Edge was cashing in his Money in the Bank contract. Edge speared Cena for a nearfall. Edge then speared Cena a second time to win the title in the first-ever Money in the Bank cash-in match.

== Aftermath ==
After the Elimination Chamber match, Kurt Angle moved to SmackDown! on January 13 when he participated in the 20-man battle royal for the vacant World Heavyweight Championship. Angle won the battle royal by last eliminating Mark Henry and became the new World Heavyweight Champion.

John Cena and Edge continued to feud over the WWE Championship. On the January 9 episode of Raw, Edge and Lita had a live sex celebration, which was crashed by Cena. Edge escaped from the ring while Cena and Lita were alone in the ring. Cena performed his finishing move, the FU on her to end the segment. Their rivalry led to a WWE Championship rematch at the Royal Rumble, which Cena won.

Tension between Trish Stratus and Mickie James continued to build following New Year's Revolution. After the duo defeated Candice Michelle and Victoria at Saturday Night's Main Event XXXII, James again attempted to kiss Stratus, but was rebuffed. James attacked Stratus, leading to a rematch for the WWE Women's Championship at WrestleMania 22, which James won, earning her first Women's Championship.

== Results ==
No.	Results	Stipulations	Times
1^{H}	Chavo Guerrero defeated Snitsky by pinfall	Singles match	4:18
2	Ric Flair (c) defeated Edge (with Lita) by disqualification	Singles match for the WWE Intercontinental Championship	7:17
3	Trish Stratus (c) defeated Mickie James by pinfall	Singles match for the WWE Women's Championship	7:18
4	Jerry Lawler defeated Gregory Helms by pinfall	Singles match	9:32
5	Triple H defeated Big Show by pinfall	Singles match	16:11
6	Shelton Benjamin (with Momma Benjamin) defeated Viscera by pinfall	Singles match	7:48
7	Ashley defeated Candice Michelle, Maria, Torrie Wilson and Victoria	Bra & Panties Gauntlet match	11:01
8	John Cena (c) defeated Carlito, Chris Masters, Shawn Michaels, Kane, and Kurt Angle	Elimination Chamber match for the WWE Championship	28:23
9	Edge (with Lita) defeated John Cena (c) by pinfall	Singles match for the WWE Championship; This was Edge's Money in the Bank cash-in match.	1:46
(c) / – the champion(s) heading into the match; H / – the match was broadcast prior to the pay-per-view on Sunday Night Heat

=== Elimination Chamber entrances and eliminations ===
Eliminated	Wrestler	Entered	Eliminated by	Method	Time
1	Kurt Angle	4	Shawn Michaels	Pinfall	13:58
2	Kane	6	Carlito and Chris Masters	Pinfall	19:24
3	Shawn Michaels	2	Carlito	Pinfall	23:35
4	Chris Masters	5	Carlito	Pinfall	28:15
5	Carlito	3	John Cena	Pinfall	28:22
Winner	John Cena (c)	1			
