= New Year's Revolution (2005) =

World Wrestling Entertainment pay-per-view event

- Promotional poster featuring Batista
- Promotion: World Wrestling Entertainment
- Brand: Raw
- Date: January 9, 2005
- City: San Juan, Puerto Rico
- Venue: Coliseo de Puerto Rico
- Attendance: 15,764
- Buy rate: 270,000

Pay-per-view chronology
| ← Previous; Armageddon | Next → Royal Rumble |

New Year's Revolution chronology
| ← Previous; First | Next → 2006 |

The 2005 New Year's Revolution was a professional wrestling pay-per-view (PPV) event produced by World Wrestling Entertainment (WWE). It was the inaugural New Year's Revolution and took place on January 9, 2005, at the Coliseo de Puerto Rico in San Juan, Puerto Rico, held exclusively for wrestlers from the promotion's Raw brand division. This was WWE's first pay-per-view event held in Puerto Rico and Latin America and the only held in Puerto Rico until Backlash in 2023. Tickets for this event sold out in less than a month, marking one of the fastest-selling events in the short history of the venue.

The main event was an Elimination Chamber match for the vacant World Heavyweight Championship between Triple H, Randy Orton, Batista, Edge, Chris Jericho, and Chris Benoit. Triple H won the match and the championship after last eliminating Orton. One of the predominant matches on the card was between Kane and Gene Snitsky, which Kane won by pinfall after performing a Tombstone Piledriver. Another primary match on the card was Muhammad Hassan versus Jerry Lawler, which Hassan won by pinfall after executing a Reverse STO.

== Production ==
=== Background ===
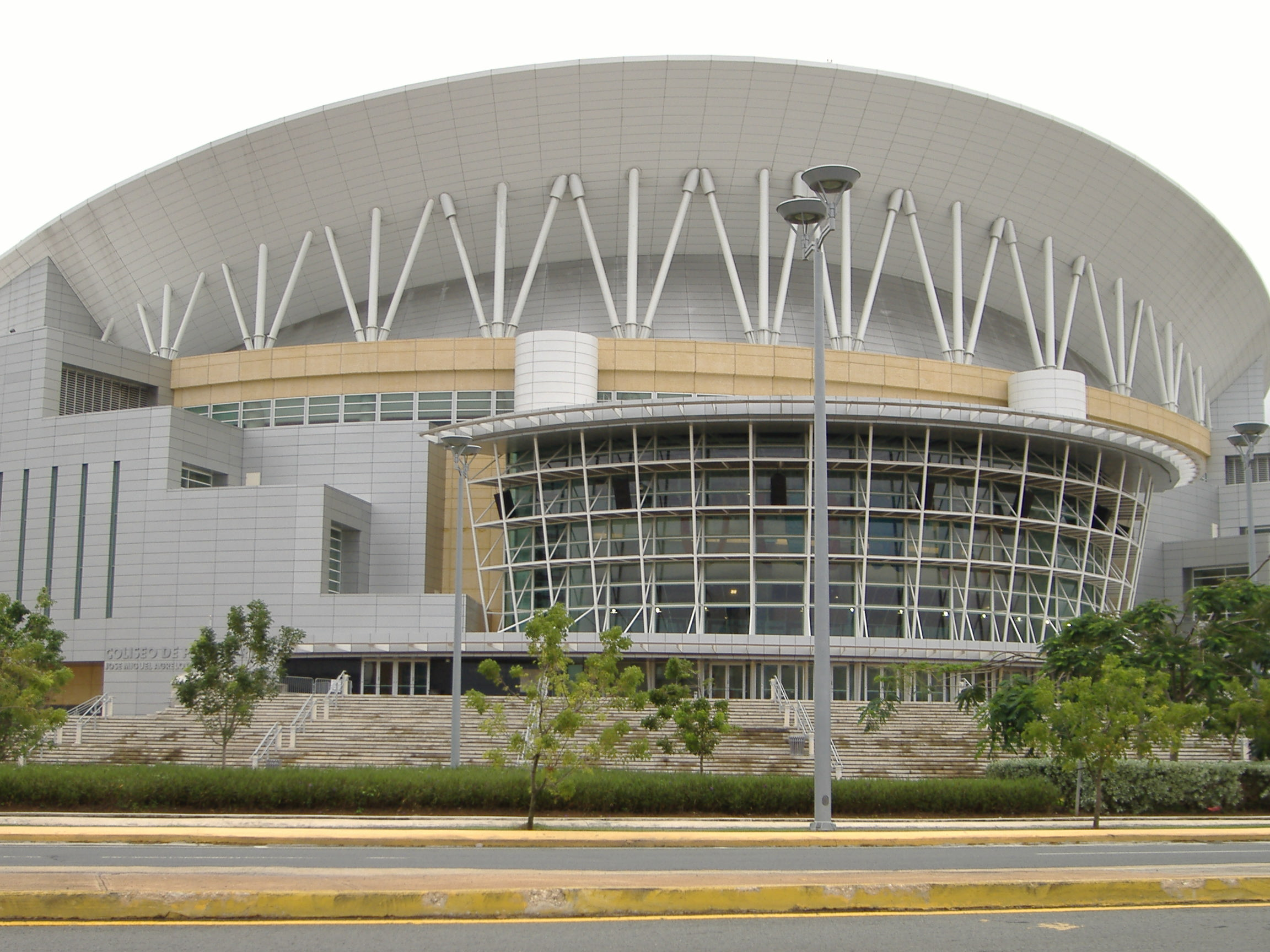
The event was held at the Coliseo de Puerto Rico in San Juan, Puerto Rico.

For World Wrestling Entertainment's (WWE) 2005 pay-per-view (PPV) calendar, the company scheduled an event for January 9, 2005, titled New Year's Revolution, a play on the Western tradition of New Year's resolutions. It was also scheduled to be produced exclusively for wrestlers of the Raw brand. It took place at the Coliseo de Puerto Rico in San Juan, Puerto Rico and was the first pay-per-view produced by WWE to be held in the U.S. territory.

=== Storylines ===
On the December 13 episode of Raw, Raw General Manager Eric Bischoff scheduled an Elimination Chamber match between Triple H, Edge, Chris Benoit, Chris Jericho, Batista and Randy Orton for New Year's Revolution for the vacant World Heavyweight Championship. On the December 27 episode of Raw, all of the match's participants competed in singles matches, with the length of their match determining the entrance order at the Elimination Chamber match. If any of the participants lost their matches, the person who beat them would replace them in the Elimination Chamber match. All six participants won their matches, but Batista won his match in three minutes and two seconds, which turned out to be the shortest match length out of all participants. As a result, Batista earned the right to enter the Elimination Chamber match last. That same night, Bischoff made Shawn Michaels the special guest referee for the match. On the January 3 episode of Raw, the six participants wrestled each other in three separate matches. In the first match, Batista pinned Benoit after a Batista Bomb. Next, Edge pinned Jericho to score the victory. In the final match, Orton pinned Triple H after delivering an RKO. During the last match, the other four Elimination Chamber participants interfered when the referee was knocked out.

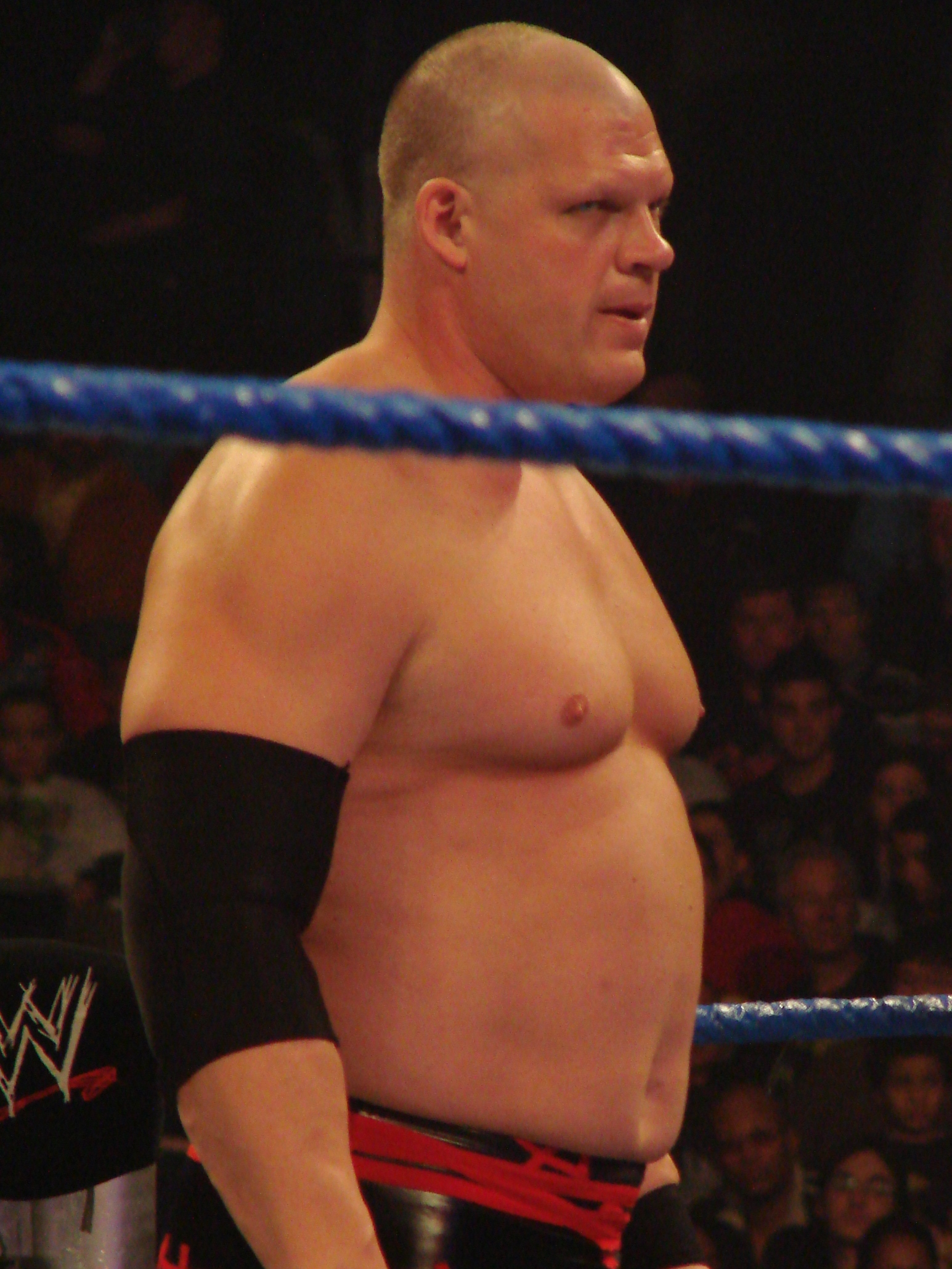
Kane, who faced Gene Snitsky at New Year's Revolution.

On the September 13 episode of Raw, during a No Disqualification match between Kane and Gene Snitsky, Snitsky accidentally pushed Kane on top of his on-screen wife Lita, who had interfered in the match. The match came to an immediate end as trainers and Emergency medical technicians took Lita on a stretcher to an ambulance, as she needed medical attention. In the storyline Lita was pregnant and as a result of the accident she suffered a miscarriage. Despite Snitsky's protestations, that the miscarriage was not his fault, Kane attacked Snitsky, leading to a bloody brawl on the October 4 episode of Raw, which led to a Weapon of Choice match between the two for Taboo Tuesday. The match was voted to be a steel chain match, where the only weapon that could be used was a steel chain. Snitsky defeated Kane after locking a steel chair around Kane's neck, and jumping onto it from the top rope, causing Kane to bleed from the mouth. In the following weeks, Snitsky would mock Lita's miscarriage before and during matches, using a "No Babies" road sign and a baby carriage in a street fight against Eugene. On the December 27 episode of Raw, Bischoff scheduled a match between Kane and Snitsky for New Year's Revolution.

Lita also feuded with Trish Stratus over the WWE Women's Championship. On the October 25 episode of Raw, Stratus approached Lita backstage and told her that she had gained weight from her pregnancy, which led to Lita attacking Stratus. That same night, a match was made between the two for the Women's Championship at Survivor Series, in which Stratus defeated Lita by disqualification after Lita hit Stratus with a steel chair. On the November 22 episode of Raw, Stratus defeated Lita and Molly Holly in a Triple Threat match to retain the title. After the match, Lita attacked Stratus and caused Stratus's nose to bleed. On the December 6 episode of Raw, Lita defeated Stratus in the main event to capture the Women's Championship after performing a moonsault. On the January 3 episode of Raw, a rematch for the title was set for New Year's Revolution. The same night, Kane returned after weeks of inactivity to save Lita from being double-teamed by Snitsky and Trish Stratus.

== Event ==
Other on-screen personnel
| Role: | Name: |
|---|---|
| English commentators | Jim Ross |
| English commentators | Jerry Lawler |
| English commentators | Jonathan Coachman |
| Spanish commentators | Carlos Cabrera |
| Spanish commentators | Hugo Savinovich |
| Interviewer | Todd Grisham |
| Ring announcer | Lilian Garcia |
| Referees | Mike Chioda |
| Referees | Chad Patton |
| Referees | Jack Doan |
| Referees | Earl Hebner |
| Referees | Shawn Michaels (Elimination Chamber Match) |

=== Preliminary matches ===
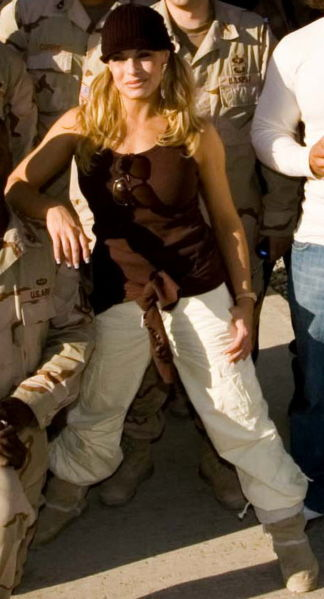
Trish Stratus won the WWE Women's Championship at New Year's Revolution

Before the event aired live on pay-per-view, The Hurricane and Rosey defeated La Résistance (Sylvain Grenier and Robért Conway) in a dark match. The first match was between the team of Eugene and William Regal and Christian and Tyson Tomko for the World Tag Team Championship. Eugene executed a dropkick on Tomko to retain the title.

In the next match, Trish Stratus faced Lita for the WWE Women's Championship. Lita suffered a legitimate injury after executing a Thesz Press off the apron on the floor, tearing her left ACL. Stratus executed a Chick Kick to win the title.

In the third match, Shelton Benjamin faced Maven for the WWE Intercontinental Championship. After Maven taunted the fans for speaking Spanish outside the ring, Benjamin rolled-up Maven to retain the title. Immediately after the match, Maven demanded a re-match. Benjamin executed a T-Bone suplex on Maven to retain the title.

In the next match, Muhammad Hassan (with Daivari) faced Jerry Lawler (with Jim Ross). Lawler attempted to pin Hassan but Daivari pulled Hassan's foot on the bottom rope, voiding the pinfall. Hassan executed a Reverse STO on Lawler to win the match.

In the sixth match, Kane faced Snitsky. Kane executed a Tombstone piledriver on Snitsky to win the match.

=== Main event ===
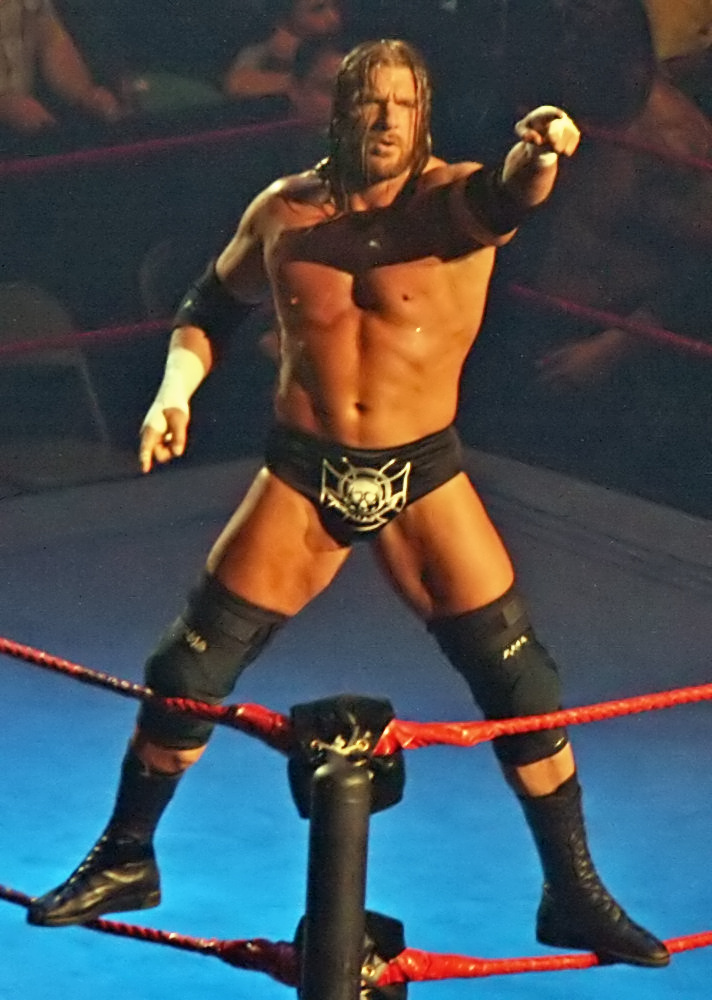
Triple H won the Elimination Chamber match to become the new World Heavyweight Champion

The main event was the Elimination Chamber match between Triple H, Edge, Chris Benoit, Chris Jericho, Batista and Randy Orton (with Shawn Michaels as the Special Guest Referee) for the vacant World Heavyweight Championship. Benoit and Jericho started in the match. Triple H entered at #3 and Edge entered after Triple H. Benoit attempted to apply the Crippler Crossface to Edge but Edge countered. Triple H executed a Pedigree on Jericho before Orton entered at #5. Edge inadvertently speared Michaels, leading to Michaels executing Sweet Chin Music on Edge and Jericho executing a Lionsault to eliminate Edge. Batista entered at #6. Batista executed a Spinebuster on Jericho onto Benoit and pinned Benoit to eliminate him. Batista executed a Batista Bomb on Jericho to eliminate him. Triple H countered an RKO from Orton by throwing him into Batista. Batista attempted a Batista Bomb to Orton but Orton countered with a low-blow to Batista, as there are no disqualifications in an Elimination Chamber match, and executed an RKO to eliminate Batista. As Ric Flair distracted Michaels, Batista delivered a clothesline to Orton. Triple H executed a Pedigree on Orton to eliminate Orton and win the title.

== Aftermath ==
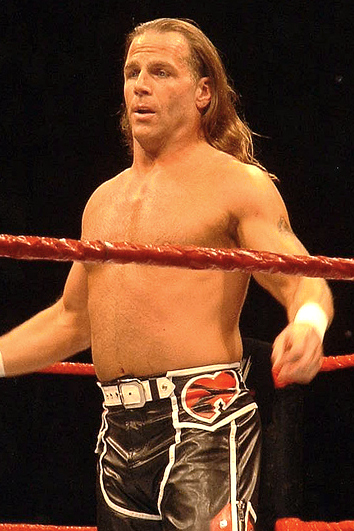
Shawn Michaels began to feud with Edge after New Year's Revolution.

The night after New Year's Revolution on Raw, Batista faced Randy Orton in a match for the position as number one contender for Triple H's World Heavyweight Championship. Orton won the match and the right to face Triple H at the Royal Rumble, whereas Batista would participate in and win the Royal Rumble match. At the same event, Triple H defeated Orton to retain the World Heavyweight Championship. At WrestleMania 21, Batista defeated Triple H to capture the title.

The feud between Kane and Gene Snitsky continued on the January 17 episode of Raw. The two competed in a No Holds barred match, which ended after Kane chokeslamed Snitsky off of the stage. On January 31, Kane defeated Snitsky in a steel cage match after delivering a chokeslam off the cage's door. The feud between Trish Stratus and Lita ended after the event, as Lita suffered a legit injury. On the January 17 episode of Raw, however, Stratus mocked Lita's injury, but was chokeslammed by Kane.

Edge was dissatisfied with Shawn Michaels's officiating during the Elimination Chamber match and defeated Michaels in a singles match at the Royal Rumble. At a house show in Winnipeg, Manitoba, Eugene (who was replaced by Jonathan Coachman after he suffered a legit ruptured left patella tendon in their match at New Year's Revolution) and William Regal lost the World Tag Team Championships to La Résistance (Rob Conway and Sylvain Grenier). La Résistance lost the titles back to William Regal and his new partner, Tajiri, on the February 7 episode of Raw.

New Year's Revolution became an annual event for the promotion's Raw brand, with a second event held in 2006. It would be a short-lived PPV, however, as the 2007 event was the final New Year's Revolution produced, as WWE reduced the number of PPVs per year after they had discontinued brand-exclusive PPVs following WrestleMania 23 in April 2007. In early 2020, WWE reused the name for a tour of house shows called the New Year's Revolution Tour. While not part of the New Year's Revolution chronology, WWE reintroduced a New Year's-themed event, which was held on January 1, 2022, called Day 1. Unlike New Year's Revolution, Day 1 took place on New Year's Day itself. The New Year's Revolution name was then used again for a special episode of Friday Night SmackDown on January 5, 2024. The 2005 New Year's Revolution would also be the only WWE pay-per-view event held in Puerto Rico until Backlash in May 2023.

== Results ==
| No. | Results | Stipulations | Times |
|---|---|---|---|
| 1^{D} | The Hurricane and Rosey defeated La Résistance (Sylvain Grenier and Robért Conway) | Tag team match | 5:13 |
| 2 | Eugene and William Regal (c) defeated Christian and Tyson Tomko | Tag team match for the World Tag Team Championship | 12:20 |
| 3 | Trish Stratus defeated Lita (c) | Singles match for the WWE Women's Championship | 3:46 |
| 4 | Shelton Benjamin (c) defeated Maven | Singles match for the WWE Intercontinental Championship | 6:07 |
| 5 | Shelton Benjamin (c) defeated Maven | Singles match for the WWE Intercontinental Championship | 0:05 |
| 6 | Muhammad Hassan (with Daivari) defeated Jerry Lawler (with Jim Ross) | Singles match | 10:51 |
| 7 | Kane defeated Gene Snitsky | Singles match | 11:37 |
| 8 | Triple H (with Ric Flair) defeated Randy Orton, Batista, Chris Jericho, Chris Benoit, and Edge | Elimination Chamber match for the vacant World Heavyweight Championship with Shawn Michaels as special guest referee | 34:56 |
(c) / – the champion(s) heading into the match; D / – this was a dark match

=== Elimination Chamber entrances and eliminations ===
| Eliminated | Wrestler | Entered | Eliminated by | Method | Time |
|---|---|---|---|---|---|
| 1 | Edge | 4 | Chris Jericho | Pinfall | 19:20 |
| 2 | Chris Benoit | 1 | Batista | Pinfall | 26:15 |
| 3 | Chris Jericho | 2 | Batista | Pinfall | 27:35 |
| 4 | Batista | 6 | Randy Orton | Pinfall | 32:32 |
| 5 | Randy Orton | 5 | Triple H | Pinfall | 34:56 |
| Winner | Triple H | 3 | | | |

== See also ==
- Professional wrestling in Puerto Rico
