= WWE Revolution =

WWE Revolution may refer to:

- WWE New Year's Revolution, an annual pay-per-view event produced by WWE
- NXT TakeOver: R Evolution, a 2014 pay-per-view event produced by WWE featuring the NXT brand
- Divas Revolution, from Women in WWE

== See also ==
- WWE Evolution, a 2018 pay-per-view event produced by WWE featuring all women wrestlers
