= New Year's Revolution (2007) =

World Wrestling Entertainment pay-per-view event

- Promotional poster featuring D-Generation X (Shawn Michaels and Triple H)
- Promotion: World Wrestling Entertainment
- Brand: Raw
- Date: January 7, 2007
- City: Kansas City, Missouri
- Venue: Kemper Arena
- Attendance: 10,000
- Buy rate: 220,000
- Tagline: The Revolution Continues…

Pay-per-view chronology
← Previous; Armageddon	Next → Royal Rumble

New Year's Revolution chronology
← Previous; 2006	Next → 2024

The 2007 New Year's Revolution was a professional wrestling pay-per-view (PPV) event produced by World Wrestling Entertainment (WWE). It was the third annual New Year's Revolution and took place on January 7, 2007, at Kemper Arena in Kansas City, Missouri, held exclusively for wrestlers from the promotion's Raw brand division.

This was the final New Year's Revolution held as a PPV event as after this 2007 event, WWE discontinued brand-exclusive PPVs following WrestleMania 23 in April, reducing the amount of PPVs produced per year. In January 2020, WWE revived the event's name for a series of WWE Live shows called the New Year's Revolution Tour, and then revived the event itself as a special episode of SmackDown in January 2024.

There were seven matches scheduled on the event's card. The main event was a standard wrestling match, in which WWE Champion John Cena defeated challenger Umaga to retain his championship. Two predominant bouts were featured on the undercard. The first was a tag team match, in which World Tag Team Champions Rated-RKO (Edge and Randy Orton) fought D-Generation X (Triple H and Shawn Michaels) to a no-contest, thus Rated-RKO retained. The other was a steel cage match between Jeff Hardy and Johnny Nitro for the Intercontinental Championship where Hardy retained.

The event received 220,000 pay-per-view buys, which was less than the 294,000 buys the previous year's event received. When the event was released on DVD, it reached a peak position of fourth on Billboard's DVD sales chart for recreational sports. It remained on the chart for six consecutive weeks.

== Production ==
=== Background ===
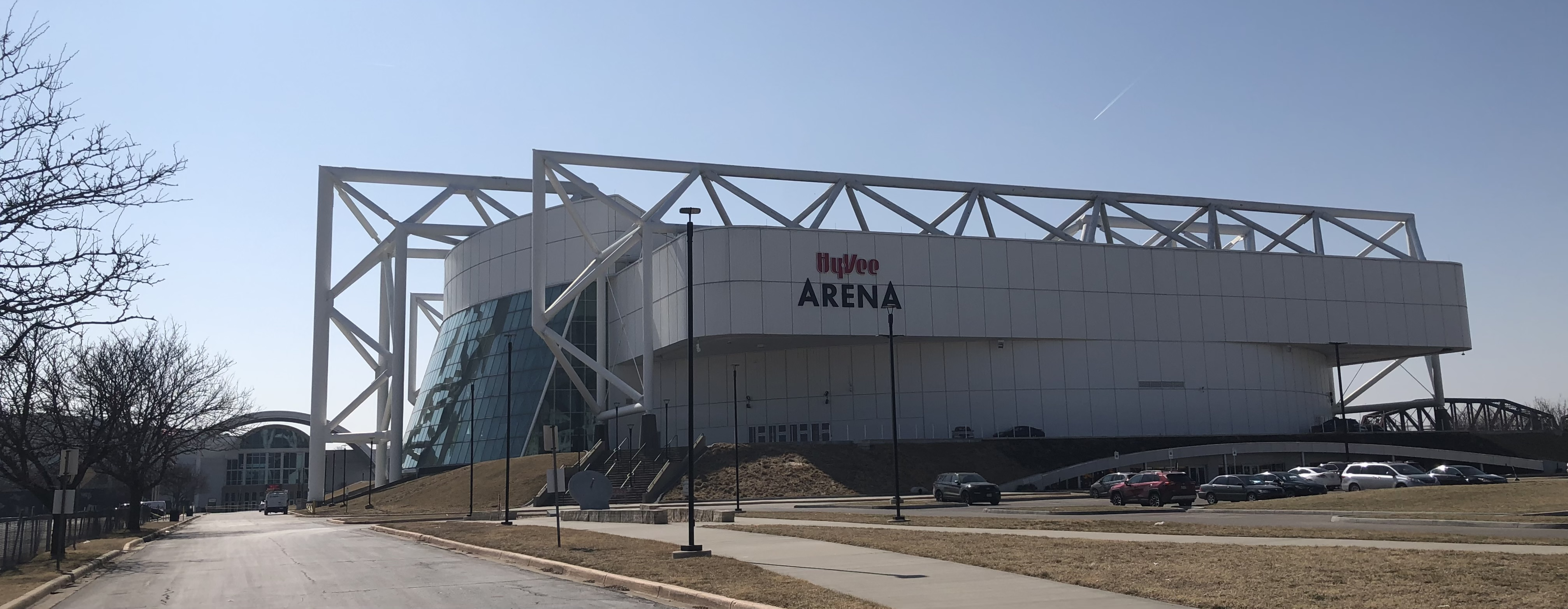
The third annual New Year's Revolution was held at Kemper Arena in Kansas City, Missouri.

New Year's Revolution was an annual professional wrestling pay-per-view (PPV) event, produced every January by World Wrestling Entertainment (WWE) since 2005. The name of the event was a play on the Western tradition of New Year's resolutions. The third event was held on January 7, 2007, at the Kemper Arena in Kansas City, Missouri. Like the previous two years's events, it was exclusively held for wrestlers from the Raw brand division.

=== Storylines ===
Seven professional wrestling matches were featured on the event's card, which were planned with predetermined outcomes by WWE's script writers. The buildup to these matches and scenarios that took place before, during, and after the event were also planned by WWE's script writers. The event featured wrestlers and other talent from WWE's Raw brand, a storyline expansion in which WWE assigned its employees.

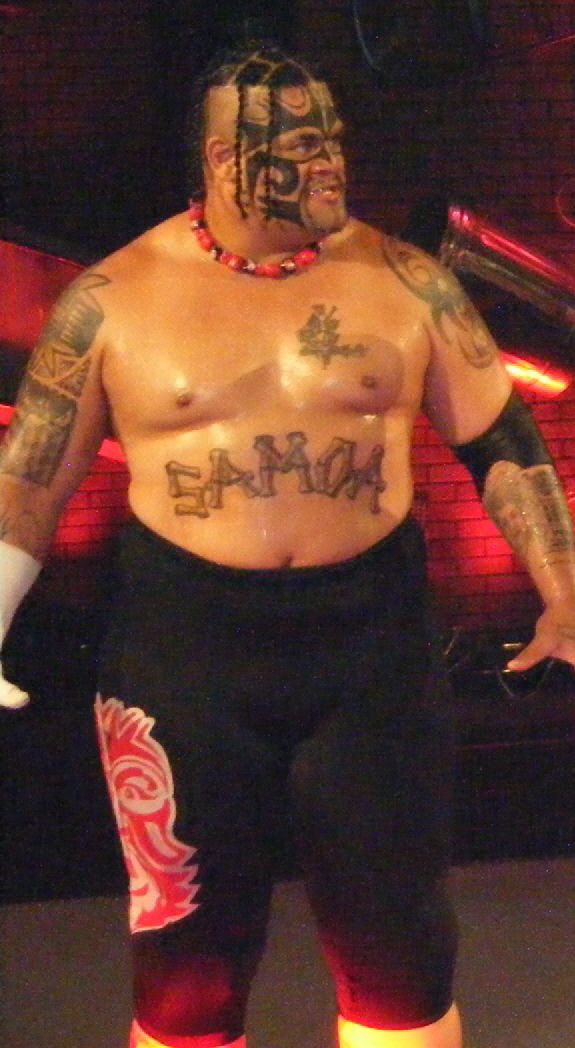
Umaga began feuding with John Cena heading into New Year's Revolution

The main rivalry heading into New Year's Revolution was between John Cena and Umaga over the WWE Championship. The rivalry began on the November 6 episode of Raw, when Cena interfered in Umaga's match while accepting a challenge to a match by Kevin Federline. One week later, Jonathan Coachman, executive assistant of Raw, announced that a match between Cena and Umaga would take place, which ended in a no-contest due to interference. Three weeks later on the November 27 edition of Raw, Umaga (through Armando Alejandro Estrada) issued a challenge to Cena for the WWE Championship, which Cena accepted. The following week, Cena was assaulted by Umaga after his match, and both were confronted by security. Afterwards, neither of them could touch each other outside of a match until New Year's Revolution. On the December 18 edition of Raw, Cena, along with D-Generation X (DX), (Triple H and Shawn Michaels) faced off against Umaga and Rated-RKO (Edge and Randy Orton). The match ended in a no-contest after Cena and Umaga started brawling to the backstage area. Two weeks later on the January 1 edition of Raw, Cena faced off against Federline in a No Disqualification match, a match where there is no rules and the only way to win is by pinfall or submission. During the match, Umaga came to the ring and hit Cena with the WWE championship belt, which allowed Federline to pin Cena for the win. This led to a 4-on-1 handicap match later that night between Johnny Nitro, Johnathan Coachman, Umaga, and Estrada and Cena, where Cena attacked Umaga with a folding chair, causing the disqualification.

Another rivalry leading up to the event was between Johnny Nitro and Jeff Hardy. In September 2006, Hardy challenged Nitro numerous times for the WWE Intercontinental Championship, but failed to win it due to repeated interference by Melina (Melina Perez) (Nitro's then-girlfriend). Hardy finally defeated Nitro to win the title on the October 2 edition of Raw. On the November 6 edition of Raw, Eric Bischoff, the Raw authority figure for the night, scheduled a match between Hardy and Nitro for the title. In the match, Melina interfered and caused Nitro to get disqualified. Due to WWE rules, a title can only change hands via pinfall or submission, as a result, Hardy retained his title. Bischoff then scheduled a No Disqualification match, which Nitro won after interference from Melina. The following week, Hardy and Nitro were scheduled in a Ladder match, a match where the contestant that climbs a ladder and retrieves an item (usually a title belt) hung above the ring is the winner. Hardy won the match and the title. On the November 27 episode of Raw, Nitro and his former tag team partner Joey Mercury, as MNM, accepted The Hardys open challenge for WWE's December pay-per-view, December to Dismember, which the Hardys came out victorious. The Hardys won the match. At Armageddon, another one of WWE's December pay-per-views, MNM and The Hardys competed in a Four team Ladder match also involving Dave Taylor and William Regal and WWE Tag Team Champions Paul London and Brian Kendrick. London and Kendrick won the match and retained their titles. During the match, Mercury legitimately broke his nose when he was struck in the face with a ladder, when Jeff jumped off the top rope. On the December 18 edition of Raw, Nitro challenged Hardy to a Steel Cage match, a match fought within a cage formed by placing four sheets of mesh metal around, in, or against the edges of the wrestling ring, for the Intercontinental Championship, which Hardy accepted. The match then was scheduled for New Year's Revolution.

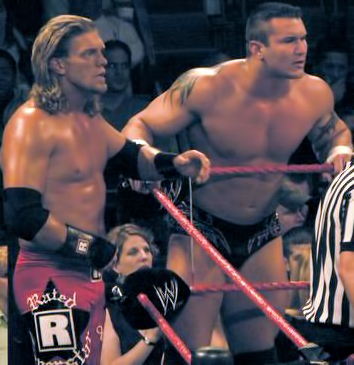
Rated-RKO (Edge and Randy Orton), the World Tag Team Champions heading into New Year's Revolution

The rivalry between Rated-RKO (Edge and Randy Orton) and D-Generation X (DX; Triple H and Shawn Michaels) began on the October 9 edition of Raw. Edge and Orton both had problems with DX in the past and formed an alliance against them, and challenged DX to a match at Cyber Sunday, WWE's only pay-per-view where people can go online and votes for different aspects of a match. Rated-RKO defeated DX, after Eric Bischoff, the referee of the match, let Orton use a folding chair, which led Rated-RKO to victory. For consecutive weeks, Triple H and Orton competed in singles matches. On the December 11 edition of Raw, Flair assisted DX in an ambush by Rated-RKO and Kenny, and Coachman came out to announce a Six-man tag team match, where DX and Flair again emerged victorious. DX would challenge Rated-RKO for the World Tag Team Championship at New Year's Revolution.

The feud between Ric Flair and Kenny Dykstra (originally just Kenny) stemmed from Flair's feud with the Spirit Squad, which Dykstra was a part of. On the October 23 edition of Raw, Dykstra was angered by his teammates' recent losing streak against Flair, and he proved himself by defeating Flair that night in a singles match. Two weeks after defeating the Spirit Squad for the World Tag Team Championship, Flair and Roddy Piper lost their titles to Rated-RKO. The legitimate reason behind their title loss was that Piper was diagnosed with cancer and had to immediately leave the show. Flair, however, continued to feud with the Spirit Squad, defeating them all at Survivor Series with his team of WWE legends. On the November 27 edition of Raw, Flair teamed up with DX to take on the Spirit Squad in a 3-on-5 handicap match. Flair and DX won, and DX packed them all in a crate (excluding Dykstra) and kayfabe sent them to Ohio Valley Wrestling. It was announced that Flair would face Dykstra at New Year's Revolution.

== Event ==
Before the event went live on pay-per-view, Vladimir Kozlov defeated Eugene in a dark match.

=== Preliminary matches ===
Other on-screen personnel
Role:	Name:
Commentators	Jim Ross
Commentators	Jerry Lawler
Commentators	Carlos Cabrera (Spanish)
Commentators	Hugo Savinovich (Spanish)
Interviewer	Todd Grisham
Ring announcer	Lilian Garcia
Referees	Mike Chioda
Referees	Jack Doan
Referees	Chad Patton
Referees	Marty Elias
Referees	John Cone

The first match that aired was for the WWE Intercontinental Championship in a Steel cage match, a match fought within a cage formed by placing four sheets of mesh metal around, in, or against the edges of the wrestling ring. Jeff Hardy was defending the title against Johnny Nitro. The match included various high-flying moves like top-rope kicks and powerbombs off the top of the cage. Near the end of the match, Hardy pulled Nitro from the top of the cage and nearly scored a pinfall after a Swanton Bomb, but Nitro put his foot on the bottom rope. Nitro then made it over the cage, but just as Nitro was about to jump, Hardy dropkicked the door open, and Nitro fell onto the top of the door, hurting him between his legs. As Nitro was on top of the door, Hardy kicked the cage door, and walked out the door to win the match and retain his Intercontinental Championship.

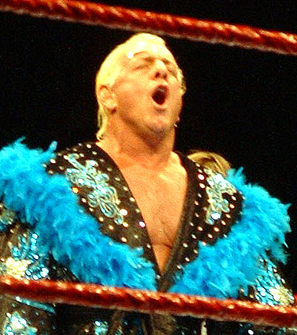
Ric Flair lost to Kenny Dykstra at the event

The next match was for a future World Tag Team Championship in a Tag Team Turmoil match. The match began with the teams of The World's Greatest Tag Team (Shelton Benjamin and Charlie Haas) and The Highlanders (Robbie and Rory McAllister). The first elimination was made when Benjamin pinned Robbie after a superplex. The World's Greatest Tag Team, defeated the second tag team Jim Duggan and Super Crazy. The third team, Lance Cade and Trevor Murdoch defeated The World's Greatest Tag Team after Cade performed a diving elbow drop on Haas and scored the pinfall. The final team, Cryme Tyme (Shad Gaspard and JTG), won the match after performing a G9 and pinning Cade to become the top contenders to the World Tag Team Championship.

After the match, Jonathan Coachman and Vince McMahon were backstage discussing the personal feud between Donald Trump and Rosie O'Donnell. McMahon announced a match between the two the next night on Raw. The third contest was between Kenny Dykstra and Ric Flair. The end of the match saw Dykstra executing an illegal low blow, when the referee was not paying attention and rolled Flair up with a small package to secure the pinfall.

The next match was between Mickie James and Victoria. Melina (who accompanied Victoria down to the ring), interfered in the match, but failed to following interference by Candice Michelle and Maria. James then did a Mickie DDT and pinned Victoria to retain her title.

Umaga about to strike John Cena in the main event

Next was the World Tag Team Championship match between the defending champions Rated-RKO (Edge and Randy Orton) and D-Generation X (Shawn Michaels and Triple H) (DX). During the match, Triple H did a spinebuster on Orton and legitimately injured his right leg. The match ended when Michaels hit the referee and then assaulted Rated-RKO with a chair. DX used steel chairs to beat down Rated-RKO. After the match, DX brutalized Rated-RKO and left them a bloody mess on the announcers' tables. Triple H gave Edge a Pedigree on the announce table, and Michaels did the diving elbow drop on Orton through the Spanish announce table.

The sixth contest was between Carlito and Chris Masters. The match came to an end when Carlito reversed the Masterlock attempt by Masters, however Masters fell on Carlito and performed a pin to successfully score the pinfall.

=== Main event match ===
Next was the main event, which saw John Cena defend the WWE Championship against Umaga. During the match, Cena attempted and failed to perform the FU various times. Cena would keep attacking Umaga by throwing Umaga's head into the steel ring post, which was followed up by a Five Knuckle Shuffle. When Cena failed to execute a FU, Umaga would take control. Umaga charged at Cena, who was positioned in a corner, but Cena raised his knees and pinned Umaga with a roll-up to end Umaga's undefeated streak and retain his WWE Championship.

== Reception ==
The Kemper Arena has a maximum capacity of 18,344, but that was reduced for New Year's Revolution. The maximum attendance that was allowed was 10,000. The event received 220,000 pay-per-view buys, which was less than the 294,000 buys the previous year's event received. The promotion's revenue was $107.4 million, which was greater than the previous year's revenue of $95.1. Canadian Online Explorer rated the overall event, as well as the main event, a six out of ten. None of the matches received a rating higher than a 7.5 out of 10. The match between Mickie James and Victoria was rated a three out of 10, the lowest overall.

The event was released on DVD on February 6, 2007. The DVD reached a peak position of eleventh on Billboard's DVD sales chart for recreational sports on February 24, 2007. It remained on the chart for six consecutive weeks, until April 7, when it ranked twelfth.

== Aftermath ==
The feud between John Cena and Umaga continued on Raw the next night, where Umaga assaulted Cena after his match with The Great Khali and also interfered in Cena's match with Jonathan Coachman two weeks later. Due to the Umaga assault, Cena injured his spleen, which was portrayed as real in their storyline. At the Royal Rumble, a Last Man Standing match was scheduled for the WWE Championship between Cena and Umaga. Cena won the match and retained his title, ending their rivalry.

It was announced that Triple H was injured with a ruptured quadriceps tendon and he did not compete on WWE television for over seven months. Shawn Michaels however, continued his feud with Rated-RKO by teaming up with Cena and defeating them for their World Tag Team Championship on the post-Royal Rumble episode of Raw. The feud ended shortly afterwards as Rated-RKO disbanded after their own rivalry began. A Triple Threat match, a standard match involving three wrestlers was made between Edge, Orton, and Michaels. Michaels won the match to become the number one contender to the WWE Championship at WrestleMania 23. Michaels then feuded with Cena, which would end at Backlash, when Cena defeated Edge, Orton and Michaels in a Fatal Four Way match, a standard wrestling match involving four wrestlers to retain his WWE Championship.

Jeff Hardy and Johnny Nitro continued to feud as members of The Hardys and MNM respectively, until their rematch at the Royal Rumble, where the Hardys were victorious. The feud then began to fade, as Joey Mercury was released from his contract, and The Hardys began to establish their single careers, participating in the Money in the Bank ladder match at WrestleMania 23.

The feud between Kenny Dykstra and Ric Flair continued. As a reward for defeating Flair at New Year's Revolution, Coachman booked Dykstra in a match with Hardy for his WWE Intercontinental Championship. Flair interfered and performed a low blow to Dykstra, allowing Hardy to win. On the following Raw, Flair defeated Dykstra in a rematch, ending their rivalry. The feuds between Carlito and Chris Masters, and Mickie James and Victoria also ended after Carlito and James won subsequent rematches, and they began to feud with Ric Flair and Melina respectively. The match between Donald Trump and Rosie O'Donnell was actually a parody match, with talent from WWE's developmental territories portraying the characters. This was the early stage of a major feud between Donald Trump and Vince McMahon, which would go on to WrestleMania.

The 2007 New Year's Revolution would be the final New Year's Revolution event held as a PPV. The PPV event was discontinued as WWE reduced the number of PPVs per year after they had discontinued brand-exclusive PPVs following WrestleMania 23 in April 2007. In January 2020, however, after 13 years since this 2007 PPV, WWE revived the New Year's Revolution name for a series of WWE Live shows called the New Year's Revolution Tour, which were held as supershows, featuring wrestlers from both Raw and SmackDown. The nine-show tour began on January 4 and ran until February 16. The ninth and final show was originally scheduled for March 15, but that final date had to be canceled due to the onset of the COVID-19 pandemic just a few days beforehand. The pandemic caused WWE to suspend its live touring schedule until July 2021, thus a New Year's Revolution Tour was not held in 2021. While not part of the New Year's Revolution chronology, WWE reintroduced a New Year's-themed PPV event, which was held on January 1, 2022, called Day 1. Unlike New Year's Revolution, Day 1 took place on New Year's Day itself.

During the December 22, 2023, episode of SmackDown, it was announced that the New Year's Revolution name had been revived again for a television special episode of SmackDown titled SmackDown: New Year's Revolution, which aired on January 5, 2024.

== Results ==
No.	Results	Stipulations	Times
1^{D}	Vladimir Kozlov defeated Eugene	Singles match	1:37
2	Jeff Hardy (c) defeated Johnny Nitro (with Melina)	Steel Cage match for the WWE Intercontinental Championship	14:50
3	Cryme Tyme (JTG and Shad Gaspard) won by last eliminating Lance Cade and Trevor Murdoch	Tag team turmoil match to determine #1 contenders to the World Tag Team Championship	19:03
4	Kenny Dykstra defeated Ric Flair	Singles match	10:02
5	Mickie James (c) defeated Victoria	Singles match for the WWE Women's Championship	6:50
6	Rated-RKO (Edge and Randy Orton) (c) vs. D-Generation X (Triple H and Shawn Michaels) ended in a no contest	Tag team match for the World Tag Team Championship	23:20
7	Chris Masters defeated Carlito (with Torrie Wilson)	Singles match	5:55
8	John Cena (c) defeated Umaga (with Armando Alejandro Estrada)	Singles match for the WWE Championship	17:20
(c) / – the champion(s) heading into the match; D / – this was a dark match

=== Tag Team Turmoil match ===
Elimination	Team	Entrance order	Eliminated by	Time
1	The Highlanders (Robbie and Rory McAllister)	1	The World's Greatest Tag Team	5:02
2	Jim Duggan and Super Crazy	3	The World's Greatest Tag Team	7:30
3	The World's Greatest Tag Team (Shelton Benjamin and Charlie Haas)	2	Lance Cade and Trevor Murdoch	11:51
4	Lance Cade and Trevor Murdoch	4	Cryme Tyme	19:03
Winners	Cryme Tyme (Shad Gaspard and JTG)	5	—N/a	

== Other on-screen personnel ==
Commentators

- Jim Ross
- Jerry Lawler
- Carlos Cabrera (Spanish)
- Hugo Savinovich (Spanish)

Interviewers

- Todd Grisham

Ring announcer

- Lilian Garcia

Referees

- Mike Chioda
- Jack Doan
- Chad Patton
- John Cone
