= Elimination Chamber =

Professional wrestling match type

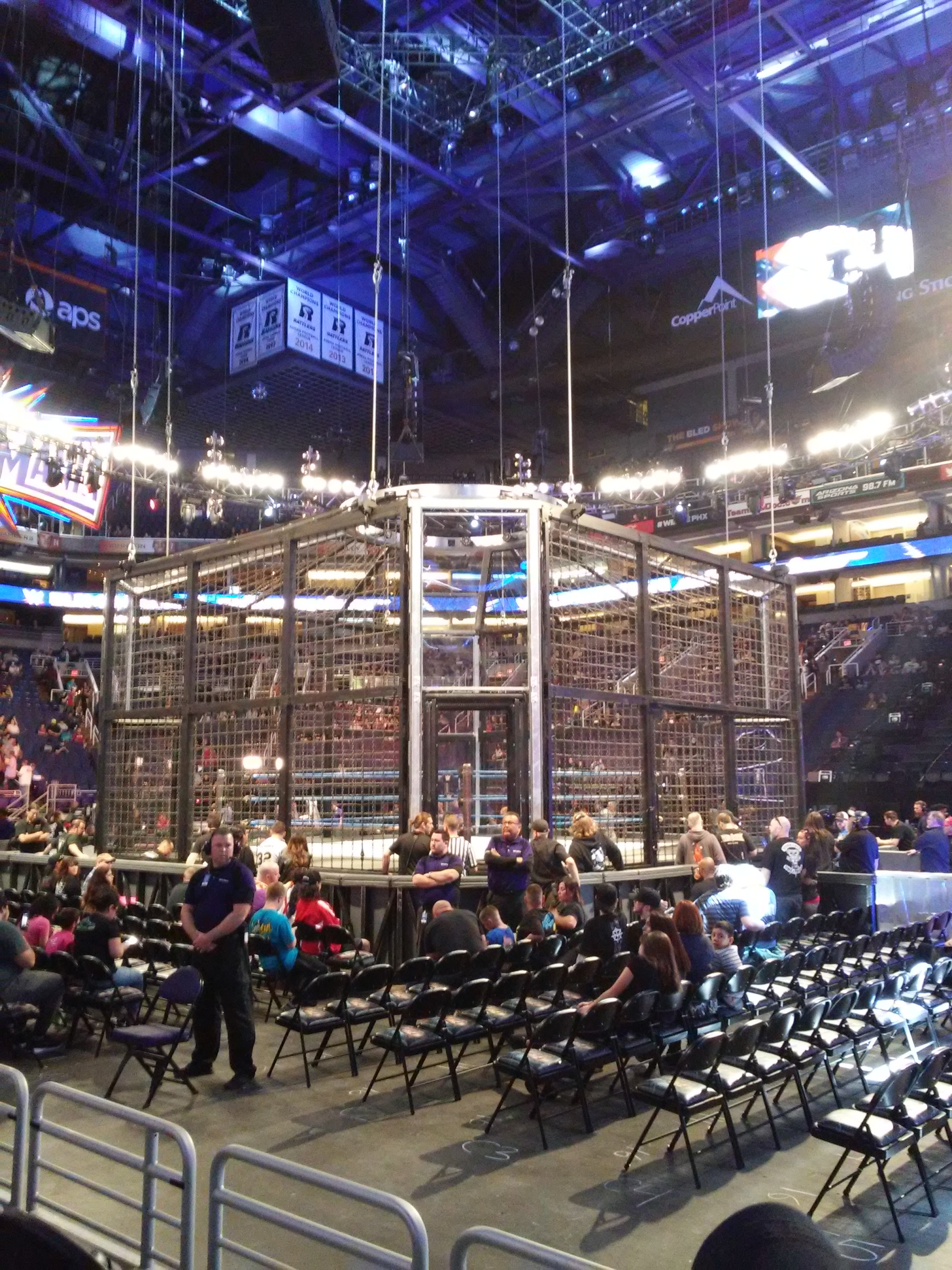
- The current Elimination Chamber structure used since 2017.
- Founded: 2002
- Style: 6-person or more Elimination Chamber Cage Match
- Headquarters: Stamford, Connecticut
- Founder: Eric Bischoff
- Parent: WWE
- Website: wwe.com

The Elimination Chamber is a professional wrestling elimination-based match held in the WWE. The match was created by Triple H, and introduced by Eric Bischoff in November 2002. It features a large chain-linked circular steel structure which encloses the ring. The chamber's floor is platformed over the ringside area which elevates it to ring level. Within the chamber are four inner enclosures outside each ring corner.

Although similar in profile and nature to WWE's original large scale steel-structured match Hell in a Cell, the Elimination Chamber match is a multiple-participant match wherein two participants begin the match in the ring as the remaining four are held within each inner enclosure and are released into the match at five-minute intervals (in the event of a seven-person match, three participants begin, and in the event of a tag-team match, two teams begin for a total of four participants starting). The objective is to eliminate each opponent from the match via pinfall or submission (which usually can only occur in the ring and not on the chamber floor surrounding the ring.) The winner is the last remaining participant (or team) after all others have been eliminated. As in the Hell in a Cell match, there are no disqualifications or count-outs during an elimination chamber match. The original structure was 16 ft (4.9 m) high, 36 ft (11 m) in diameter, weighed over 10 short tons (9,100 kg), and comprised 2 mi (3.2 km) and 6 short tons (5,400 kg) of chain.

Before the establishment of the yearly Elimination Chamber pay-per-view (PPV) in 2010, the match was contested at other PPV events. There have been 38 Elimination Chamber matches in WWE since the concept's inception in November 2002. Every Elimination Chamber match has had a stipulation that the winner would win a championship or a future match for a championship (usually at WrestleMania, though one time the championship match occurred immediately after the Elimination Chamber match).

== History ==
=== Origin ===
Before the introduction of the Elimination Chamber match, WWE only promoted two matches in a caged environment, namely the steel cage and Hell in a Cell matches. The steel cage was the first type of cage-based match in professional wrestling and consisted of four fenced walls of steel surrounding the ring apron while the Hell in a Cell was a taller roofed version that surrounded the ring and ringside area on the ground rather than the apron. In 2002, WWE announced the creation of the Elimination Chamber, a match that combined elements of WWE's Hell in a Cell matches, Royal Rumble match, Survivor Series match, and World Championship Wrestling's (WCW) WarGames matches, such as the countdown timer and time intervals from the Royal Rumble and War Games matches, the large enclosed cage format of both Hell in a Cell and WarGames and the elimination process from the Survivor Series contest and the Royal Rumble.

=== Brand and pay-per-view designation ===
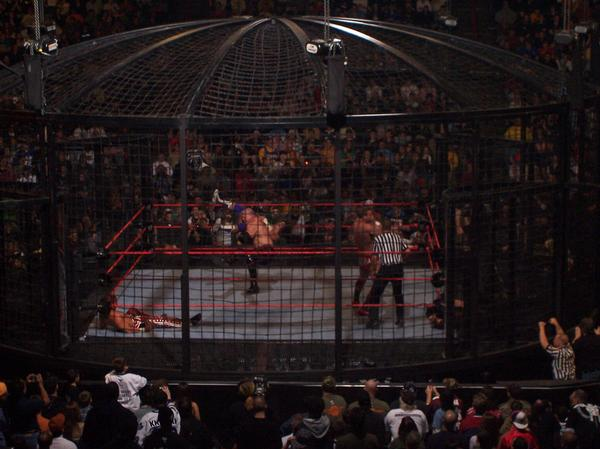
The Raw brand Elimination Chamber match at New Year's Revolution in January 2006

To exploit additional on-screen talent after buying World Championship Wrestling (WCW) in March 2001, the following year WWE began a brand extension that divided the roster between the two brands of WWE, namely Raw and SmackDown. Former WCW President and then Raw General Manager Eric Bischoff formally announced the creation of the chamber during the October 21 episode of Raw and scheduled the match to feature participants from the Raw brand roster at the Survivor Series in November 2002. The match was exclusive to the Raw brand for the first four matches and at joint-branded pay-per-view events, but upon the creation of the ECW brand in 2006 the match was instead promoted for the newly created brand at December to Dismember. Beginning in 2008, the match became exclusive to the No Way Out event and two Elimination Chamber matches were featured annually for two years among the three brands. In 2010, WWE replaced their No Way Out event with the self-titled Elimination Chamber, a new event which continued the tradition of its predecessor. From 2008 to 2014, the match had been featured in February events only. An Elimination Chamber event took place on May 31, 2015 exclusively on the WWE Network. After the second brand extension in 2016, it was announced that the brands would return to having separate events. In late 2016, it was announced that Elimination Chamber would return as a SmackDown-exclusive event in February 2017, but it switched to being Raw-exclusive in February 2018, which was the last brand-exclusive Elimination Chamber event, as following WrestleMania 34 that year, brand-exclusive pay-per-views were discontinued.

=== Injuries ===
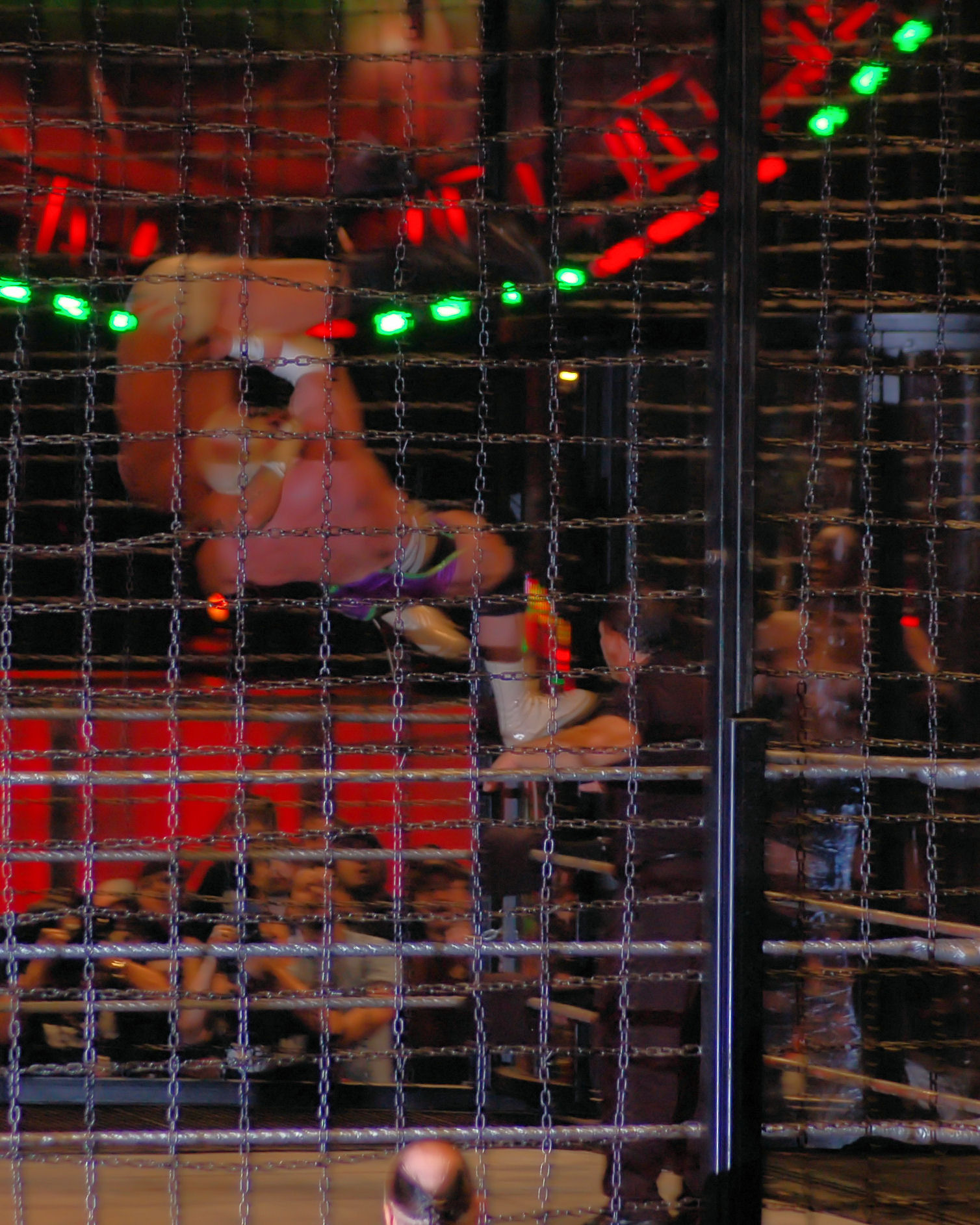
Hardcore Holly and CM Punk compete in the Extreme Elimination Chamber at December to Dismember in December 2006

Triple H suffered an injury during the 2002 Survivor Series match with swelling on the inside of his throat which put pressure on his esophagus and trachea. This was caused after Rob Van Dam performed the Five Star Frog Splash off the top of one of the chambers. Triple H also expressed concern that he might have broken his wrist and noted anything could have caused it. Sheamus reportedly suffered a concussion during the Raw Elimination Chamber match in 2010. Also in 2010, The Undertaker was involved in a pyrotechnics accident during his ring entrance. He was temporarily engulfed in flames on three occasions when the pyrotechnics were mistimed and his jacket briefly caught on fire. He suffered first and second-degree burns to his neck and chest and according to a WWE spokesperson the injury "looked like a bad sunburn". He was only allowed to participate in the match after being cleared by a ringside doctor and was given bottles of water throughout the match to douse himself with to alleviate the discomfort. Acknowledging the concern, WWE now had padded the steel floor of the chamber.

=== Compilation release ===
In July 2010, WWE released Satan's Prison: The Anthology of the Elimination Chamber, a DVD featuring every Elimination Chamber match as of the 2010 Elimination Chamber. The European release of the DVD is titled Iron Will, primarily over the name change of the structure, match type and pay-per-view in Germany to avoid a brand blunder with the Elimination Chamber name as it may create imagery of gas chambers during The Holocaust (the Elimination Chamber pay-per-view, structure and match are called No Escape in Germany).

== Match ==
=== Rules ===
The Elimination Chamber match is a variation of elimination-based matches which draws elements from steel cage and Hell in a Cell matches in that the wrestling ring is surrounded by a large steel-fenced cage supported by girders. Originally, its design was a circular-like chain-linked structure, but since 2017 it is now square and encloses the ring. Its floor is platformed over the ringside area around the ring which elevates and levels it with the ring mat. Within the Elimination Chamber, four enclosures, referred to as inner chambers or pods, are encased in plexiglass and face the outside of each ring post. The match is contested by six or seven participants: two or three starting in the ring, while the other four are held within each inner chamber. The Elimination Chamber in February 2018 featured a seven-man chamber match in which three participants began. At regular intervals, one of the four participants within an inner chamber enters the match. This continues until all four have been released. The entrance intervals are typically five minutes, though four and three minute gaps have also been used.

The objective of the match is to eliminate each opponent from the match by scoring a pinfall or a submission. These can occur in the ring or on the chamber's elevated floor, but starting with the 2010 event all pinfalls and submissions must take place within the ring. Disqualifications and count-outs do not apply in the process of elimination. The winner of the match is the last remaining participant after all others have been eliminated (or after all members of the opposing tag team are eliminated in either the tag team matches or the twelve-on-twelve tornado tag team elimination matches). The same rules apply when the match involves six tag teams, where two teams start in the ring and a new team leaves the pod and enters the ring at regular intervals.

=== Structure ===
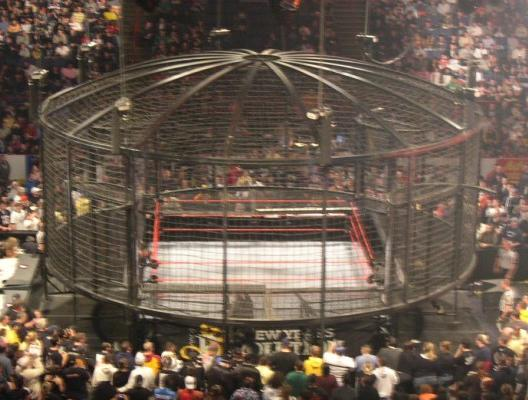
The original Elimination Chamber structure that was used between 2002 and 2015 at New Year's Revolution in January 2006.

According to a WWE Magazine article in 2009 by WWE's production designer Jason Robinson, who co-designed the structure, several designs for the Elimination Chamber were considered. The structure was manufactured in Colorado Springs, Colorado and took six to eight weeks to make from design blueprints. It cost US$ 250,000 to construct.

The structure is made of black-painted steel with an outer structure of 16 frames, each weighing 300 pounds (140 kg). The chamber is 16 ft (4.9 m) high and 36 ft (11 m) in diameter and weighs a total of 16 short tons (15,000 kg), 10 of which consists of steel. Each inner chamber consists of three large steel framed sheets of plexiglass, costing US$225 per sheet. The chains that surround the chamber stretch 2 mi (3.2 km) long and weigh 6 short tons (5,400 kg).

A 50 ft (15 m) flatbed truck is needed to transport the chamber. Assembly in the arena takes eight hours to complete and eight motors are used to suspend the structure over the ring before each event. When not in use, the structure is stored at a dock in Newark, New Jersey. Unlike standard steel cage matches and Hell in a Cell matches, Elimination Chamber matches cannot be held at several arenas due to the structure's massive size and weight, similar to how WarGames matches could only be held at certain arenas. This would play a factor in WWE dropping the annual Elimination Chamber event.

In 2017, the Elimination Chamber event returned (2017's event was SmackDown-exclusive while 2018's was Raw-exclusive). In addition, the chamber structure was redesigned, becoming square instead of circular. The pods were also changed from circular to square and feature sliding doors that referees slide open from outside the chamber. At the top of the chamber at its center which is now 26 ft (7.9 m) tall is a large cutout of the WWE logo. The steel grates between the ring and the cage were also replaced with padding. LED lights also line the corners of the structure. The redesign was for practical purposes due to certain venues only being able to house the previous structure, allowing most venues to host the Chamber.

=== Variations ===
The fifth match, held by the ECW brand at December to Dismember, was a slight variation called the Extreme Elimination Chamber. In this variation, each chamber had one of four weapons for the competitors locked inside to hold on to. When each competitor's chamber opened, their weapon entered the match with them. The four weapons used in the match were a crowbar, a table, a steel folding chair, and a barbed wire-wrapped baseball bat.

The 2015 Elimination Chamber event saw another slight variation of the match, namely the tag team chamber match. Both team members were inside of their respective pods, for a total of six tag teams in the match. Two teams, totaling four individual participants, started the match. This match was for the WWE Tag Team Championship. This variation was repeated in 2019, but for women and to determine the inaugural holders of the WWE Women's Tag Team Championship. Another tag team chamber match happened in 2020 for the WWE SmackDown Tag Team Championship.

The 2018 Elimination Chamber featured the first seven-man chamber match. Due to the extra person, three competitors started the match instead of two. The 2018 event also featured the first women's chamber match, but there were no variations in the rules.

=== Interference ===
Despite the structure, interference has become common inside the Elimination Chamber. At New Year's Revolution in January 2005, Ric Flair distracted guest referee Shawn Michaels allowing Batista (who had been eliminated) to attack Randy Orton so Triple H could win the match. At No Way Out in February 2009, Edge attacked Kofi Kingston during his entrance and locked himself in one of the pods becoming a participant in the match for the World Heavyweight Championship after losing the WWE Championship earlier in the night. At Elimination Chamber in February 2010, Cody Rhodes passed Ted DiBiase Jr. a metal pipe which he used to eliminate Randy Orton in the match for the WWE Championship. Later in the night, Shawn Michaels broke into the chamber to cost The Undertaker his World Heavyweight Championship to Chris Jericho. At the Elimination Chamber event in February 2013, Mark Henry took out the remaining participants in the chamber for a World Heavyweight Championship match at WrestleMania 29 after being eliminated until SmackDown General Manager Booker T broke it up. At the Elimination Chamber for the WWE World Heavyweight Championship in February 2014, The Wyatt Family interfered by attacking John Cena, leading to his eventual elimination by Randy Orton. Kane would then come out to help escort The Wyatt Family out of the chamber, but would then interfere to cost Daniel Bryan the match to Orton. At the Elimination Chamber event in February 2023, Logan Paul interfered by sneaking into the chamber and attacking Seth "Freakin" Rollins, which subsequently allowed Austin Theory to retain the WWE United States Championship. At the Elimination Chamber event in February 2024, AJ Styles interfered to attack LA Knight, leading to his elimination. At the Elimination Chamber event in March 2025, Jade Cargill attacked Naomi before the match officially began, leading to Naomi being medically unable to compete in the match. At the Elimination Chamber event in February 2026, Seth Rollins interfered to attack Logan Paul, as Paul did to Rollins in 2023, leading to his subsequent elimination, then, Undisputed WWE Champion Drew McIntyre interfered to attack Cody Rhodes.

=== Match history ===
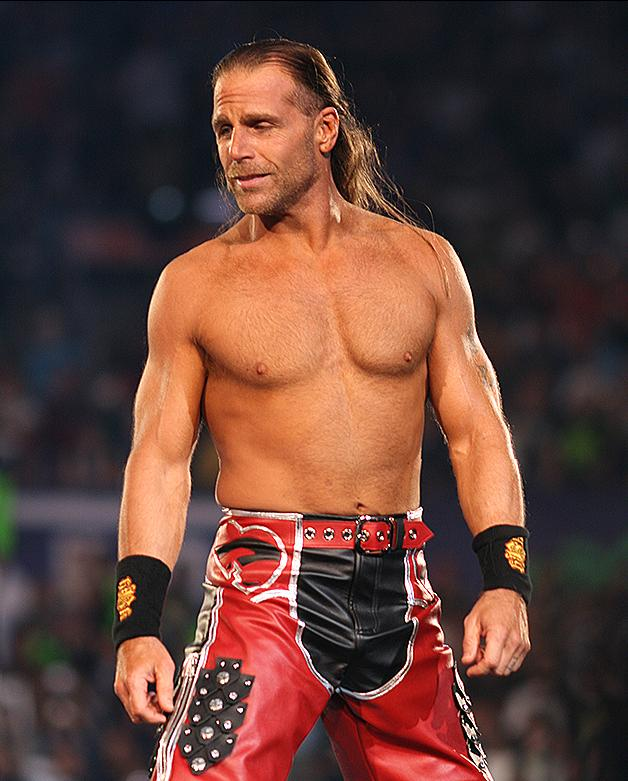
Inaugural winner Shawn Michaels

The inaugural Elimination Chamber match occurred at Survivor Series on November 17, 2002 at Madison Square Garden in New York City, New York. The match was for the World Heavyweight Championship, involving defending champion Triple H, Booker T, Chris Jericho, Kane, Rob Van Dam, and Shawn Michaels. Michaels won the match and the title and became the inaugural winner by last eliminating Jericho and defending champion Triple H.

Overall, there have been 38 matches, 29 of which took place at the annual Elimination Chamber event. Since its inception in 2002, at least one Elimination Chamber match has taken place every year with the exception of 2004, 2007, and 2016. As of Elimination Chamber: Chicago on February 28, 2026, 22 male wrestlers, two male teams, eight female wrestlers, and one female team have won the Elimination Chamber match. Triple H and John Cena are tied for the most wins at four each. Randy Orton has the most appearances at ten. Chris Jericho has scored the most total eliminations at ten. Braun Strowman and Shayna Baszler are tied for the most eliminations scored in a single match at five each. Although they are tied for the most eliminations, Baszler is the only winner to eliminate all of her opponents in a single match as Strowman's match where he scored five eliminations was a match involving seven competitors.

The Raw brand has been featured the most with 21 matches, including six joint-branded matches with SmackDown. The SmackDown brand has been featured in 14 matches, including the joint-branded matches with both ECW and Raw. ECW has been featured in two matches, including its joint-branded match with SmackDown.

The majority of matches have been contested for a top-tier championship with the WWE Championship (once as the WWE World Heavyweight Championship) being contested for the most in nine matches. The original World Heavyweight Championship was contested the second-most in seven matches, while the ECW World Championship, WWE Tag Team Championship, SmackDown Tag Team Championship, Intercontinental Championship, Raw Women's Championship, and United States Championship were contested in one match each. Twelve matches (two in 2008, one in 2011, 2013, 2018, 2020, 2022, and 2023, two in 2024, two in 2025, and two in 2026) have awarded the winners the number-one contendership for the WWE Championship, original World Heavyweight Championship, WWE Universal Championship, Raw Women's Championship, current World Heavyweight Championship, and Women's World Championship, respectively, at those years' WrestleMania; in 2021, SmackDown's Chamber match awarded the winner the number-one contendership for the Universal Championship that same night, which happened immediately after the Chamber match itself.

The Elimination Chamber match has been contested only in indoor arenas in the United States, twice in Canada and once each in Puerto Rico and Saudi Arabia, with the 2024 event in Australia being the first to be held in an outdoor venue. From 2008 to 2014, the match had been featured in February pay-per-view events only. An Elimination Chamber pay-per-view event took place on May 31, 2015, exclusively on the WWE Network and would also mark the first time the Chamber was used for a match that was not for a world championship or a future world championship match (although it would include the first ever tag team Elimination Chamber match). The Elimination Chamber in February 2018 featured the first seven-man Elimination Chamber match as well as the first Elimination Chamber match for women with the Raw Women's Championship contested. The Elimination Chamber in February 2019 featured a tag team Elimination Chamber match, the second overall tag team chamber match, but this time for women to determine the inaugural holders of the WWE Women's Tag Team Championship.

== List of Elimination Chamber matches ==
R	Raw brand	S	SmackDown brand	N	NXT brand	E	ECW brand

No.	Event	Date	Winner			Other participants	
No.	Event	Date	Wrestler		Prize	Other participants	
1	Survivor Series	November 17, 2002	R	Shawn Michaels	World Heavyweight Championship	R	Triple H (c), Booker T, Chris Jericho, Kane, Rob Van Dam
2	SummerSlam	August 24, 2003	R	Triple H (c)	World Heavyweight Championship	R	Chris Jericho, Goldberg, Kevin Nash, Randy Orton, Shawn Michaels
3	New Year's Revolution	January 9, 2005	R	Triple H	Vacant World Heavyweight Championship	R	Batista, Chris Benoit, Chris Jericho, Edge, Randy Orton
4	New Year's Revolution	January 8, 2006	R	John Cena (c)	WWE Championship	R	Carlito, Chris Masters, Kane, Kurt Angle, Shawn Michaels
5 (Note: This edition of the match was promoted as the Extreme Elimination Chamber, which featured a weapon in each inner chamber.)	December to Dismember	December 3, 2006	E	Bobby Lashley	ECW World Championship	E	Big Show (c), CM Punk, Hardcore Holly (Note: Sabu was originally scheduled as a participant, but due to an attack by Hardcore Holly backstage, Holly took his place.), Rob Van Dam, Test
6	No Way Out	February 17, 2008	S	The Undertaker	World Heavyweight Championship match at WrestleMania XXIV	S	Batista, Finlay, The Great Khali, MVP
6	No Way Out	February 17, 2008	S	The Undertaker	World Heavyweight Championship match at WrestleMania XXIV	E	Big Daddy V
7	No Way Out	February 17, 2008	R	Triple H	WWE Championship match at WrestleMania XXIV	R	Chris Jericho, JBL, Jeff Hardy, Shawn Michaels, Umaga
8	No Way Out	February 15, 2009	R	Triple H	WWE Championship	S	Edge (c), Big Show, Jeff Hardy, The Undertaker, Vladimir Kozlov
9	No Way Out	February 15, 2009	S	Edge (Note: Kofi Kingston was originally scheduled as a participant. He was replaced by Edge who forced his way into the match by attacking him during his entrance.)	World Heavyweight Championship	R	John Cena (c), Chris Jericho Kane, Mike Knox, Rey Mysterio
10	Elimination Chamber	February 21, 2010	R	John Cena	WWE Championship	R	Sheamus (c), Kofi Kingston, Randy Orton, Ted Dibiase, Triple H
11	Elimination Chamber	February 21, 2010	S	Chris Jericho	World Heavyweight Championship	S	The Undertaker (c), CM Punk, John Morrison, R-Truth, Rey Mysterio
12	Elimination Chamber	February 20, 2011	S	Edge (c)	World Heavyweight Championship	S	Big Show (Note: Dolph Ziggler was originally scheduled as a participant, but was replaced by the Big Show before the match because he was fired on SmackDown two days earlier in kayfabe.), Drew McIntyre, Kane, Rey Mysterio, Wade Barrett
13	Elimination Chamber	February 20, 2011	R	John Cena	WWE Championship match at WrestleMania XXVII	R	CM Punk, John Morrison, King Sheamus, R-Truth, Randy Orton
14	Elimination Chamber (Note: The brand extension was not in effect from August 2011 to July 2016.)	February 19, 2012	—N/a	CM Punk (c)	WWE Championship	—N/a	Chris Jericho, Dolph Ziggler, Kofi Kingston, The Miz, R-Truth
15	Elimination Chamber	February 19, 2012	—N/a	Daniel Bryan (c)	World Heavyweight Championship	—N/a	Big Show, Cody Rhodes, The Great Khali (Note: Mark Henry was originally scheduled as a participant, but due to a suspension by SmackDown General Manager Theodore Long, he was replaced by The Great Khali.), Santino Marella (Note: Randy Orton was originally scheduled as a participant, but due to suffering a concussion caused by Daniel Bryan, he was replaced by Santino Marella, who won a battle royal to take Orton's spot.), Wade Barrett
16	Elimination Chamber	February 17, 2013	—N/a	Jack Swagger	World Heavyweight Championship match at WrestleMania 29	—N/a	Chris Jericho (Note: Rey Mysterio was originally scheduled as a participant, but due to suffering an injury, he was replaced by Chris Jericho.) Daniel Bryan, Kane, Mark Henry, Randy Orton
17	Elimination Chamber	February 23, 2014	—N/a	Randy Orton (c)	WWE World Heavyweight Championship (Note: In December 2013, the WWE Championship and World Heavyweight Championship were unified to become the WWE World Heavyweight Championship, retaining the lineage of the WWE Championship while the World Heavyweight Championship was retired.)	—N/a	Cesaro, Christian, Daniel Bryan, John Cena, Sheamus
18	Elimination Chamber	May 31, 2015	—N/a	The New Day (Big E, Kofi Kingston, and Xavier Woods)	WWE Tag Team Championship	—N/a	The Ascension (Konnor and Viktor), Los Matadores (Diego and Fernando), The Lucha Dragons (Kalisto and Sin Cara), The Prime Time Players (Darren Young and Titus O'Neil), Tyson Kidd and Cesaro
19	Elimination Chamber	May 31, 2015	—N/a	Ryback	Vacant WWE Intercontinental Championship	—N/a	Dolph Ziggler, King Barrett, Mark Henry (Note: Rusev was originally scheduled as a participant, but due to suffering a broken foot, he was replaced by Mark Henry.), R-Truth, Sheamus
20	Elimination Chamber	February 12, 2017	S	Bray Wyatt	WWE Championship (Note: The WWE World Heavyweight Championship reverted to being called the WWE Championship after the reintroduction of the brand extension in 2016.)	S	John Cena (c), AJ Styles, Baron Corbin, Dean Ambrose, The Miz
21 (Note: This was the first Elimination Chamber match to be contested between female wrestlers.)	Elimination Chamber	February 25, 2018	R	Alexa Bliss (c)	WWE Raw Women's Championship	R	Bayley, Mandy Rose, Mickie James, Sasha Banks, Sonya Deville
22 (Note: This was the first Elimination Chamber to feature seven men, with three men starting the match.)	Elimination Chamber	February 25, 2018	R	Roman Reigns	WWE Universal Championship match at WrestleMania 34	R	Braun Strowman, Elias, Finn Bálor, John Cena, The Miz, Seth Rollins
23 (Note: This match determined the inaugural holders of the WWE Women's Tag Team Championship, with three teams from Raw and SmackDown each.)	Elimination Chamber	February 17, 2019	R	The Boss 'n' Hug Connection (Bayley and Sasha Banks)	Inaugural WWE Women's Tag Team Championship	R	Nia Jax and Tamina, The Riott Squad (Liv Morgan and Sarah Logan)
23	Elimination Chamber	February 17, 2019	R	The Boss 'n' Hug Connection (Bayley and Sasha Banks)	Inaugural WWE Women's Tag Team Championship	S	Carmella and Naomi, Fire and Desire (Mandy Rose and Sonya Deville), The IIconics (Billie Kay and Peyton Royce)
24	Elimination Chamber	February 17, 2019	S	Daniel Bryan (c)	WWE Championship	S	AJ Styles, Jeff Hardy, Kofi Kingston (Note: Mustafa Ali was originally scheduled to be part of the match, but due to suffering an injury, he was replaced by Kofi Kingston.), Randy Orton, Samoa Joe
25	Elimination Chamber	March 8, 2020	S	The Miz and John Morrison (c)	WWE SmackDown Tag Team Championship	S	Dolph Ziggler and Robert Roode, Heavy Machinery (Otis and Tucker), Lucha House Party (Gran Metalik and Lince Dorado), The New Day (Big E and Kofi Kingston), The Usos (Jey Uso and Jimmy Uso)
26	Elimination Chamber	March 8, 2020	R	Shayna Baszler	WWE Raw Women's Championship match at WrestleMania 36	R	Asuka, Liv Morgan, Natalya, Ruby Riott, Sarah Logan
27	Elimination Chamber	February 21, 2021	S	Daniel Bryan	Immediate WWE Universal Championship match (Note: The WWE Universal Championship match happened immediately after SmackDown's Elimination Chamber match.)	S	Cesaro, Jey Uso, Kevin Owens, King Corbin, Sami Zayn
28	Elimination Chamber	February 21, 2021	R	Drew McIntyre (c)	WWE Championship	R	AJ Styles, Jeff Hardy, Kofi Kingston, Randy Orton, Sheamus
29	Elimination Chamber	February 19, 2022	R	Bianca Belair	WWE Raw Women's Championship at WrestleMania 38	R	Alexa Bliss, Doudrop, Liv Morgan, Nikki A.S.H., Rhea Ripley
30	Elimination Chamber	February 19, 2022	R	Brock Lesnar	WWE Championship	R	Bobby Lashley (c), AJ Styles, Austin Theory, Riddle, Seth "Freakin" Rollins
31	Elimination Chamber	February 18, 2023	R	Asuka	WWE Raw Women's Championship match at WrestleMania 39	R	Carmella, Nikki Cross
31	Elimination Chamber	February 18, 2023	R	Asuka	WWE Raw Women's Championship match at WrestleMania 39	S	Liv Morgan, Natalya, Raquel Rodriguez
32	Elimination Chamber	February 18, 2023	R	Austin Theory (c)	WWE United States Championship	R	Bronson Reed, Damian Priest, Johnny Gargano, Montez Ford, Seth "Freakin" Rollins
33	Elimination Chamber: Perth	February 24, 2024	R	Becky Lynch	Women's World Championship match at WrestleMania XL	R	Liv Morgan, Raquel Rodriguez
33	Elimination Chamber: Perth	February 24, 2024	R	Becky Lynch	Women's World Championship match at WrestleMania XL	S	Bianca Belair, Naomi, Tiffany Stratton
34	Elimination Chamber: Perth	February 24, 2024	R	Drew McIntyre	World Heavyweight Championship match at WrestleMania XL	S	Bobby Lashley, Kevin Owens, LA Knight, Logan Paul, Randy Orton
35	Elimination Chamber: Toronto	March 1, 2025	S	Bianca Belair	Women's World Championship match at WrestleMania 41	R	Bayley, Liv Morgan
35	Elimination Chamber: Toronto	March 1, 2025	S	Bianca Belair	Women's World Championship match at WrestleMania 41	S	Alexa Bliss, Naomi
35	Elimination Chamber: Toronto	March 1, 2025	S	Bianca Belair	Women's World Championship match at WrestleMania 41	N	Roxanne Perez
36	Elimination Chamber: Toronto	March 1, 2025	R	John Cena	Undisputed WWE Championship match at WrestleMania 41	R	CM Punk, Logan Paul, Seth "Freakin" Rollins
36	Elimination Chamber: Toronto	March 1, 2025	R	John Cena	Undisputed WWE Championship match at WrestleMania 41	S	Damian Priest, Drew McIntyre
37	Elimination Chamber: Chicago	February 28, 2026	R	Rhea Ripley	WWE Women's Championship match at WrestleMania 42	R	Asuka, Raquel Rodriguez
37	Elimination Chamber: Chicago	February 28, 2026	R	Rhea Ripley	WWE Women's Championship match at WrestleMania 42	S	Tiffany Stratton, Alexa Bliss, Kiana James
38	Elimination Chamber: Chicago	February 28, 2026	S	Randy Orton	Undisputed WWE Championship match at WrestleMania 42	R	LA Knight, Je'Von Evans, Logan Paul (Note: On the February 27, 2026, episode of SmackDown, Jey Uso was attacked backstage by an unknown assailant. Later that night, Logan Paul defeated Jacob Fatu to earn the right to replace Uso in the match.)
38	Elimination Chamber: Chicago	February 28, 2026	S	Randy Orton	Undisputed WWE Championship match at WrestleMania 42	S	Cody Rhodes, Trick Williams
(c) – the champion heading into the match

== See also ==
- Hell in a Cell
- Steel cage
- WWE Elimination Chamber

=== Notations ===
- "WWE Elimination Chamber History (2002–2008)". WWE. Archived from the original on 17 February 2008.
