= Raw (WWE brand) =

Professional wrestling roster division, referred to as brands, in WWE

- Logo for the brand and the WWE Raw television program since January 6, 2025
- Product type: Professional wrestling Sports entertainment
- Current owner: WWE
- Produced by: Triple H Lee Fitting
- Country: United States
- Introduced: March 25, 2002 (first split); July 19, 2016 (second split)
- Discontinued: August 29, 2011 (first split)
- Related brands: SmackDown; NXT
- General Manager; Adam Pearce Predecessor: World Championship Wrestling (See: Aftermath of The Invasion)

Raw is a brand of the American professional wrestling promotion WWE that was established on March 25, 2002. Brands are divisions of WWE's roster where wrestlers are assigned to perform on a weekly basis when a brand extension is in effect. Wrestlers assigned to Raw primarily appear on the brand's weekly television program, Monday Night Raw, which began in 1993, also referred to simply as Raw. It is one of WWE's two main brands, along with SmackDown, which were formed in 2002 after WWE absorbed WCW. Raw and SmackDown are collectively referred to as WWE's main roster. The brand extension was discontinued between August 2011 and July 2016.

In addition to Raw's main television program, less-utilized wrestlers also appear on the brand's supplementary show, Main Event. Raw's wrestlers also perform on the branded and co-branded pay-per-view and livestreaming events and the quarterly Saturday Night's Main Event special. The brand's wrestlers also appears in their sister promotion, Lucha Libre AAA Worldwide (AAA), which WWE acquired in 2025. During the first brand split (2002–2011), Raw wrestlers also competed on the former supplementary show, Heat, and on ECW under a talent exchange program with the former ECW brand, while during the second brand split (2016–present), the brand's wrestlers have appeared in the interbrand Worlds Collide, Mixed Match Challenge, and annual Tribute to the Troops events. Additionally during the second split, Raw's cruiserweight wrestlers competed on 205 Live when WWE's revived cruiserweight division was exclusive to Raw from 2016 to 2018 before 205 Live became its own brand.

== History ==
=== First split (2002–2011) ===
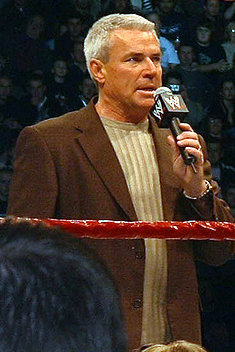
Eric Bischoff was the first Raw General Manager.

In early-to-mid-2002, then World Wrestling Federation (WWF) underwent a process they called the "brand extension". The WWF divided itself into two de facto wrestling promotions with separate rosters, storylines and authority figures. Raw and SmackDown! would host each division, give its name to the division and essentially compete against each other. The split came about as a result of the WWF purchasing their two biggest competitors, World Championship Wrestling (WCW) and Extreme Championship Wrestling (ECW); and the subsequent doubling of its roster and championships. The brand extension was publicly announced by Linda McMahon during a telecast of Raw on March 25 and became official the next day.

At the time, this excluded the WWE Undisputed Championship and the original WWE Women's Championship as those WWE titles would be defended on both shows. In September 2002, then WWE Undisputed Champion Brock Lesnar refused to defend the title on Raw, in effect causing his title to become exclusive to SmackDown!. The following week on Raw, Raw General Manager Eric Bischoff awarded a newly instated World Heavyweight Championship to Raw's designated number one contender Triple H. Because the WWE Undisputed Championship was now a SmackDown! exclusive title, it was no longer referred to as "undisputed". Following this, the original WWE Women's Championship soon became a Raw exclusive title as well. As a result of the brand extension, an annual "draft lottery" was instituted to exchange members of each roster and generally refresh the lineups.

Raw was the home brand for many top WWE stars including Triple H, Ric Flair, R-Truth, Batista, Randy Orton, Chris Benoit, CM Punk, Goldberg, Booker T, Chris Jericho, Christian, Shawn Michaels, John Cena, Kane, Cody Rhodes, Trish Stratus, Lita and Stacy Keibler.

The 2005 draft was held on the June 6 episode of Raw. The first draft lottery pick was then WWE Champion John Cena, thus moving the WWE Championship to Raw and having two titles on the brand. Eventually, then World Heavyweight Champion Batista was drafted to SmackDown! as the last draft pick, leaving only the WWE Championship on Raw. In the 2008 draft lottery, CM Punk got drafted to Raw and then won the World Heavyweight Championship from Edge, who was a SmackDown wrestler. Triple H, who was the WWE Champion at the time, got drafted to SmackDown while Kane, who was the then ECW Champion, got drafted to Raw. After the draft lottery in 2009, the WWE Championship was brought back to Raw when Triple H was drafted from SmackDown while the World Heavyweight Championship was brought back to SmackDown when Edge defeated John Cena to win the title at Backlash.

On the August 29, 2011, episode of Raw, it was announced that performers from Raw and SmackDown were no longer exclusive to their respective brand. Subsequently, championships previously exclusive to one show or the other were available for wrestlers from any show to compete for—this would mark the end of the brand extension as all programming and live events featured the full WWE roster. In a 2013 interview with Advertising Age, Stephanie McMahon explained that WWE's decision to end the brand extension was due to wanting their content to flow across television and online platforms.

=== Second split (2016–present) ===
On May 25, 2016, it was announced that WWE would be reintroducing the brand split in July, with distinctive rosters for both Raw and SmackDown. On the July 11 episode of Raw, Vince McMahon named Stephanie McMahon the Commissioner of Raw. The draft took place on the live premiere of SmackDown on July 19, with the General Managers of the respective brands hand-picking the wrestlers for their brands. Raw's Commissioner Stephanie McMahon and General Manager Mick Foley created a new championship—the WWE Universal Championship. This championship would be exclusive to the Raw brand, as the WWE World Championship had become exclusive to the SmackDown brand. Clash of Champions was scheduled as the reintroduction of the cruiserweight division and the first Raw-exclusive pay-per-view since January 2007, whereas Elimination Chamber was scheduled as the final Raw-exclusive pay-per-view two years later. Subsequently, this saw all upcoming pay-per-views interbranded after WrestleMania 34.

Beginning in December 2021, talents from Raw begin to appear on NXT. Dave Meltzer of the Wrestling Observer Radio reported that a Raw-NXT crossover between their talents as a way to help boost NXT 2.0 ratings as both shows air on the USA Network.

After SmackDown moved to Fox in October 2019, Raw lost its status as the main "A" Show. When Raw moved to Netflix in January 2025, this brand regained its "A" Show status and Raw became the home of WWE's top stars such as Roman Reigns, CM Punk, Seth Rollins, The Usos (Jimmy and Jey), Rhea Ripley and Gunther.

== Champions ==
Initially, the WWE Undisputed Championship and the original WWE Women's Championship were available to both brands. The other championships were exclusive to the brand the champion was a part of. When the brand extension began, Raw received the Intercontinental Championship and the European Championship when their respective holders were drafted. In September 2002, the WWE Undisputed Championship became the WWE Championship again and was moved to SmackDown, prompting Raw General Manager Eric Bischoff to create the World Heavyweight Championship for Raw. Shortly thereafter, Raw became the exclusive brand for the World Tag Team Championship, the Intercontinental Championship and the original WWE Women's Championship.

On July 19, 2016, the brand extension was brought back and for the first time ever the draft was held on SmackDown Live. Raw drafted the WWE Women's Championship, the United States Championship, and the WWE Tag Team Championship. With the WWE Championship being defended exclusively on SmackDown, Stephanie McMahon and Mick Foley introduced the WWE Universal Championship to be Raw's world title. At Crown Jewel on October 31, 2019, SmackDown wrestler "The Fiend" Bray Wyatt won the WWE Universal Championship, thus taking the title to SmackDown. On the next night's episode of SmackDown, WWE Champion Brock Lesnar quit SmackDown and moved to Raw, bringing the title with him. A new World Heavyweight Championship was created for Raw after Undisputed WWE Universal Champion Roman Reigns was drafted to SmackDown in 2023.

=== Current championships ===
Raw
Championship	Current champion(s)	Reign	Date won	Days held	Location	Notes	Ref.
World Heavyweight Championship	Roman Reigns	1	April 19, 2026	213	Paradise, Nevada, United States	Defeated CM Punk on Night 2 of WrestleMania 42.	
Women's World Championship	Liv Morgan	4	October 10, 2026	39	New Orleans, Louisiana, United States	Defeated Becky Lynch and Stephanie Vaquer in a triple threat match on Money in the Bank.	
Men's Intercontinental Championship	Ethan Page	1	November 2, 2026	16	Brooklyn, New York, United States	Defeated Chad Gable on Raw.	
Women's Intercontinental Championship	Iyo Sky	1	November 16, 2026	2	Raleigh, North Carolina, United States	Defeated Raquel Rodriguez on Raw.	
World Tag Team Championship	Penta and Je'Von Evans	1	November 6, 2026	12	Riyadh, Saudi Arabia	Defeated The Vision (Bron Breakker & Austin Theory) at Crown Jewel.	
Women's Tag Team Championship	Michin and B-Fab	1	October 23, 2026	26	Ontario, California, United States	Defeated Alexa Bliss and Tatum Paxley on SmackDown.	

The WWE Women's Tag Team Championship is defended across Raw, SmackDown, and NXT. Michin and B-Fab's home brand is SmackDown.

=== Previous active championships ===
Championship	Time on brand
WWE Championship	November 4, 2019 — April 28, 2023
WWE Women's Championship (Current)	July 19, 2016 — April 28, 2023
WWE United States Championship	April 22, 2019 — May 1, 2023

==== Previous defunct championships ====
Championship	Time on brand
WWE European Championship	March 25, 2002 — July 22, 2002
WWE Universal Championship	July 25, 2016 — October 31, 2019
WWE Hardcore Championship	March 26, 2002 — August 26, 2002
ECW Championship	June 23, 2008 — June 29, 2008
World Tag Team Championship (Original)	July 29, 2002 — December 13, 2008
WWE Women's Championship (Original)	September 24, 2002 — April 13, 2009
Million Dollar Championship	April 5, 2010 — November 15, 2010
WWE Divas Championship	April 13, 2009 — September 19, 2010
WWE 24/7 Championship	May 20, 2019 — November 9, 2022 (Note: The championship was shared amongst all of WWE's brands, until it was retired on November 9, 2022.)

== Pay-per-view and WWE Network events ==
=== First brand split events ===
Date	Event	Venue	Location	Main event
May 4, 2002	Insurrextion	Wembley Arena	London, England	Triple H vs. The Undertaker
June 7, 2003	Insurrextion	Telewest Arena	Newcastle, England	Triple H (c) vs. Kevin Nash in a Street Fight match for the World Heavyweight Championship
June 15, 2003	Bad Blood	Compaq Center	Houston, Texas	Triple H (c) vs. Kevin Nash in a Hell in a Cell match for the World Heavyweight Championship with Mick Foley as special guest referee
September 21, 2003	Unforgiven	Giant Center	Hershey, Pennsylvania	Triple H (c) vs. Goldberg in a Title vs. Career match for the World Heavyweight Championship; Had Triple H been disqualified or counted out, he would lose the title
December 14, 2003	Armageddon	TD Waterhouse Center	Orlando, Florida	Goldberg (c) vs. Kane vs. Triple H in a Triple threat match for the World Heavyweight Championship
April 18, 2004	Backlash	Rexall Place	Edmonton, Alberta, Canada	Chris Benoit (c) vs. Triple H vs. Shawn Michaels in a Triple threat match for the World Heavyweight Championship
June 13, 2004	Bad Blood	Nationwide Arena	Columbus, Ohio	Triple H vs. Shawn Michaels in a Hell in a Cell match
July 11, 2004	Vengeance	Hartford Civic Center	Hartford, Connecticut	Chris Benoit (c) vs. Triple H for the World Heavyweight Championship
September 12, 2004	Unforgiven	Rose Garden Arena	Portland, Oregon	Randy Orton (c) vs. Triple H for the World Heavyweight Championship
October 19, 2004	Taboo Tuesday	Bradley Center	Milwaukee, Wisconsin	Randy Orton vs. Ric Flair in a Steel Cage match
January 9, 2005	New Year's Revolution	Coliseo de Puerto Rico	San Juan, Puerto Rico	Batista vs. Chris Benoit vs. Chris Jericho vs. Edge vs. Randy Orton vs. Triple H in an Elimination Chamber match for the vacant World Heavyweight Championship with Shawn Michaels as special guest referee
May 1, 2005	Backlash	Verizon Wireless Arena	Manchester, New Hampshire	Batista (c) vs. Triple H for the World Heavyweight Championship
June 26, 2005	Vengeance	Thomas & Mack Center	Paradise, Nevada	Batista (c) vs. Triple H in a Hell in a Cell match for the World Heavyweight Championship
September 18, 2005	Unforgiven	Ford Center	Oklahoma City, Oklahoma	John Cena (c) vs. Kurt Angle for the WWE Championship
November 1, 2005	Taboo Tuesday	iPayOne Center	San Diego, California	John Cena (c) vs. Kurt Angle vs. Shawn Michaels in a Triple threat match for the WWE Championship
January 8, 2006	New Year's Revolution	Pepsi Arena	Albany, New York	John Cena (c) vs. Edge for the WWE Championship; This was Edge's Money in the Bank cash-in match
April 30, 2006	Backlash	Rupp Arena	Lexington, Kentucky	John Cena (c) vs. Edge vs. Triple H in a Triple threat match for the WWE Championship
June 25, 2006	Vengeance	Charlotte Bobcats Arena	Charlotte, North Carolina	D-Generation X (Shawn Michaels and Triple H) vs. The Spirit Squad (Johnny, Kenny, Mikey, Mitch and Nicky) in a 2-on-5 handicap match
September 17, 2006	Unforgiven	Air Canada Centre	Toronto, Ontario, Canada	Edge (c) vs. John Cena in a Tables, Ladders, and Chairs match for the WWE Championship
November 5, 2006	Cyber Sunday	U.S. Bank Arena	Cincinnati, Ohio	King Booker (c) vs. Big Show vs. John Cena in a Triple threat match for the World Heavyweight Championship
January 7, 2007	New Year's Revolution	Kemper Arena	Kansas City, Missouri	John Cena (c) vs. Umaga for the WWE Championship

=== Second brand split events ===
Date	Event	Venue	Location	Main event
September 25, 2016	Clash of Champions	Bankers Life Fieldhouse	Indianapolis, Indiana	Kevin Owens (c) vs. Seth Rollins for the WWE Universal Championship
October 30, 2016	Hell in a Cell	TD Garden	Boston, Massachusetts	Sasha Banks (c) vs. Charlotte Flair in a Hell in a Cell match for the WWE Raw Women's Championship
December 18, 2016	Roadblock: End of the Line	PPG Paints Arena	Pittsburgh, Pennsylvania	Kevin Owens (c) vs. Roman Reigns for the WWE Universal Championship
March 5, 2017	Fastlane	Bradley Center	Milwaukee, Wisconsin	Kevin Owens (c) vs. Goldberg for the WWE Universal Championship
April 30, 2017	Payback	SAP Center	San Jose, California	Braun Strowman vs. Roman Reigns
June 4, 2017	Extreme Rules	Royal Farms Arena	Baltimore, Maryland	Bray Wyatt vs. Finn Bálor vs. Roman Reigns vs. Samoa Joe vs. Seth Rollins in an Extreme Rules match to determine the #1 contender for the WWE Universal Championship
July 9, 2017	Great Balls of Fire	American Airlines Center	Dallas, Texas	Brock Lesnar (c) vs. Samoa Joe for the WWE Universal Championship
September 24, 2017	No Mercy	Staples Center	Los Angeles, California	Brock Lesnar (c) vs. Braun Strowman for the WWE Universal Championship
October 22, 2017	TLC: Tables, Ladders & Chairs	Target Center	Minneapolis, Minnesota	Dean Ambrose, Kurt Angle and Seth Rollins vs. Braun Strowman, Cesaro, Kane, Sheamus and The Miz in a 3-on-5 handicap Tables, Ladders, and Chairs match
February 25, 2018	Elimination Chamber	T-Mobile Arena	Paradise, Nevada	Braun Strowman vs. Elias vs. Finn Bálor vs. John Cena vs. Roman Reigns vs. Seth Rollins vs. The Miz in an Elimination Chamber match for a WWE Universal Championship match at WrestleMania 34
