= New Year's resolution =

Promise or commitment an individual makes around the beginning of the year

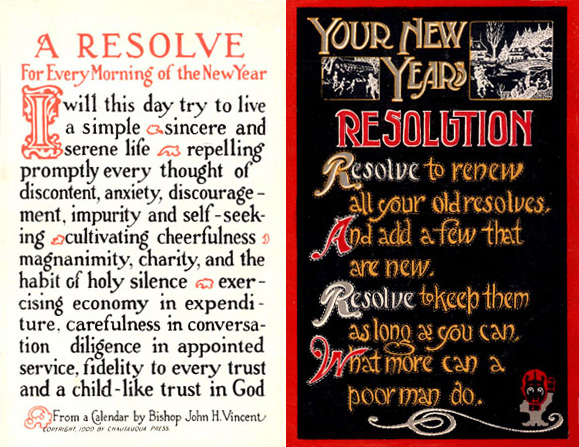
Early 20th-century New Year's resolution postcards

A New Year's resolution is a tradition, most common in the Western world but also found in the Eastern World, in which a person resolves to continue good practices, change an undesired trait or behavior, accomplish a personal goal, or otherwise improve their behaviour at the beginning of a calendar year.

== Religious origins ==
Around 2000 B.C., the Babylonians celebrated the New Year during a 12-day festival called Akitu (starting with the vernal equinox). This was the start of the farming season to plant crops, crown their king, and make promises to return borrowed farm equipment and pay their debts.

The Babylonian New Year was adopted by the ancient Romans, as was the tradition of resolutions. The timing, however, eventually shifted with the Julian calendar in 46 B.C., which declared January 1st as the start of the new year and began each year by making promises to the god Janus, for whom the month of January is named.

In the medieval era, the knights took the "peacock vow" at the end of the Christmas season each year to re-affirm their commitment to chivalry.

At watchnight services, many Christians prepare for the year ahead by praying and making these resolutions. In Methodist Christianity, the liturgy used for the watchnight service for the New Year is the Covenant Renewal Service; in addition to being traditionally held on New Year's Eve, many churches offer the Covenant Renewal Service on both New Year's Eve and on the morning of New Year's Day.

This tradition has many other religious parallels. During Judaism's New Year, Rosh Hashanah, through the High Holy Days and culminating in Yom Kippur (the Day of Atonement), one is to reflect upon one's wrongdoings over the year and both seek and offer forgiveness. People can act similarly during the Christianity liturgical season of Lent, although the motive behind this holiday is more of sacrifice than of responsibility. The concept, regardless of creed, is to reflect upon self-improvement annually.

== Participation ==
The 1671 diary of Anne Halkett includes an entry on January 2 titled "Resolutions", which contained a number of religious pledges taken primarily from bible verses, such as "I will not offend any more."

By the beginning of the 19th century, the tendency of people to make (and fail to keep) resolutions was commonly known and satirized. Walker's Hibernian Magazine in 1802 contained an article stating that "the following personages have begun the year with a strong of resolutions, which they all solemnly pledged to keep", then listing a series of obviously fictitious resolutions ("Statesmen have resolved to have no other object in view than the good of their country…the physicians have determined to follow nature in her operations, and to prescribe no more than is necessary, and to be very moderate in their fees.")

An early instance of the complete phrase "new year resolution" is found in a January 1st issue of a Boston newspaper from 1813:

And yet, I believe there are multitudes of people, accustomed to receive injunctions of new year resolutions, who will sin all the month of December, with a serious determination of beginning the new year with new resolutions and new behaviour, and with the full belief that they shall thus expiate and wipe away all their former faults.

At the end of the Great Depression, about a quarter of American adults formed New Year's resolutions. At the start of the 21st century, about 40% did. In fact, according to the American Medical Association, approximately 40% to 50% of Americans participated in the New Year's resolution tradition from the 1995 Epcot and 1985 Gallup Polls. A study found 46% of participants who made common New Year's resolutions (e.g. weight loss, exercise programs, quitting smoking) were likely to succeed, over ten times as among those deciding to make life changes at other times of the year.

== Success rate ==
Evidence for actual behavioral changes after New Year's resolutions is mixed. The effect is most pronounced immediately after the new year, but decreases soon afterwards. Approach-oriented goals, rather than avoidance-oriented goals, can lead to better results.

In a 2014 report, 35% of participants who failed their New Year's resolutions admitted they had unrealistic goals, 33% of participants did not keep track of their progress, and 23% forgot about them; the remaining respondents claimed they made too many resolutions.

A 1972 study of 382 students at the University of Wisconsin showed minimal impact of New Year's resolutions on weight loss commitments, with the study finding that making a resolution or being monitored did not significantly affect weight loss.

A 2007 study by Richard Wiseman from the University of Bristol involving 3,000 people showed that 88% of those who set New Year resolutions fail, despite the fact that 52% of the study's participants were confident of success at the beginning. Men achieved their goal 22% more often when they engaged in goal setting, wherein resolutions are made in terms of small and measurable goals (e.g., "lose a pound a week" rather than "lose weight").

A 2026 longitudinal study of over 1.1 million learners on the piano learning app Skoove, conducted in collaboration with DataPulse Research, identified a significant "Success Gap" linked to enrollment timing. The analysis found that while nearly 25% of all annual enrollments occur during the "Fresh Start" window of December and January, these cohorts demonstrate the lowest long-term habit retention. Specifically, learners who bypass this seasonal impulse and begin in the second quarter (April–June) are over 60% more likely to maintain their practice for at least six months compared to those starting in December. Students starting in May reached the highest success rate, showing a 69% higher likelihood of persistence than the December cohort.
