= No Way Out (2004) =

World Wrestling Entertainment pay-per-view event

- Promotional poster featuring Eddie Guerrero
- Promotion: World Wrestling Entertainment
- Brand: SmackDown!
- Date: February 15, 2004
- City: Daly City, California, US
- Venue: Cow Palace
- Attendance: 11,000
- Buy rate: 350,000
- Tagline: Wanted For: Lying. Cheating. Stealing.

Pay-per-view chronology
← Previous; Royal Rumble	Next → WrestleMania XX

No Way Out chronology
← Previous; 2003	Next → 2005

The 2004 No Way Out was a professional wrestling pay-per-view (PPV) event produced by World Wrestling Entertainment (WWE). It was the sixth No Way Out and took place on February 15, 2004, at the Cow Palace in Daly City, California, United States. It was held exclusively for wrestlers from the promotion's SmackDown! brand division, which made it the first brand-exclusive No Way Out after the previous year's event also featured wrestlers from Raw.

The event is best remembered for its main event, which saw Eddie Guerrero defeat Brock Lesnar to win the WWE Championship, his top wrestling achievement before his death in 2005. No Way Out grossed over US$450,000 ticket sales from an attendance of approximately 11,000 and received 350,000 pay-per-view buys, and was instrumental in helping WWE increase its pay-per-view revenue by $11.9 million compared to the previous year. Like the event, the DVD received favorable reviews.

== Production ==
=== Background ===
No Way Out was a professional wrestling pay-per-view (PPV) event first held by World Wrestling Entertainment (WWE) as the 20th In Your House PPV event in February 1998. Following the discontinuation of the In Your House series in February 1999, No Way Out was reinstated in February 2000 as its own PPV event, thus establishing it as the annual February PPV for the promotion. The sixth event was held on February 15, 2004, at the Cow Palace in Daly City, California. While the previous year's event featured wrestlers from both the Raw and SmackDown! brands, the 2004 event was held exclusively for SmackDown!, which made it the first brand-exclusive No Way Out.

=== Storylines ===
The event consisted of eight professional wrestling matches with wrestlers involved in pre-existing scripted feuds, and storylines. Wrestlers were portrayed as either villains or fan favorites as they followed a series of tension-building events, which culminated in a wrestling match or series of matches. All wrestlers belonged to the SmackDown! brand – a storyline division in which WWE assigned its employees to a different program.

The primary storyline involved the WWE Championship, which at the time was held by Brock Lesnar. At the Royal Rumble on January 25, the SmackDown! brand was victorious in the Royal Rumble match when Chris Benoit last eliminated Big Show to win. This would have entitled Benoit, who had an ongoing feud with general manager Paul Heyman at the time, to a championship match against Lesnar at WrestleMania XX.

The night after the Royal Rumble on Raw, in his role as Sheriff of Raw, "Stone Cold" Steve Austin interrupted an in-ring confrontation between long-time rivals Triple H and Shawn Michaels concerning Raw's World Heavyweight Championship. Their Last Man Standing match at the pay-per-view ended in a draw, and Michaels was seeking another shot at the championship. Austin denied Michaels's request, saying that the winner of the Royal Rumble match had the first shot at the champion. However, it never explicitly was stated that the champion had to be a member of the same brand as the Royal Rumble winner; thus, Benoit opted to take his guaranteed title shot and move over to Raw to challenge Triple H instead.

Three days later, an angry Vince McMahon confronted Heyman on SmackDown! and demanded to know what he was going to do. Heyman announced that there would be a second Royal Rumble match that night, with 13 of the 15 brand representatives from the pay-per-view participating; the winner would then receive the next shot at the championship at No Way Out. Hardcore Holly, who had been feuding with Lesnar since returning at Survivor Series in November 2003, was added to the match in place of an injured Matt Morgan. The last spot was filled by Eddie Guerrero, who went on to win the match and earn the championship opportunity.

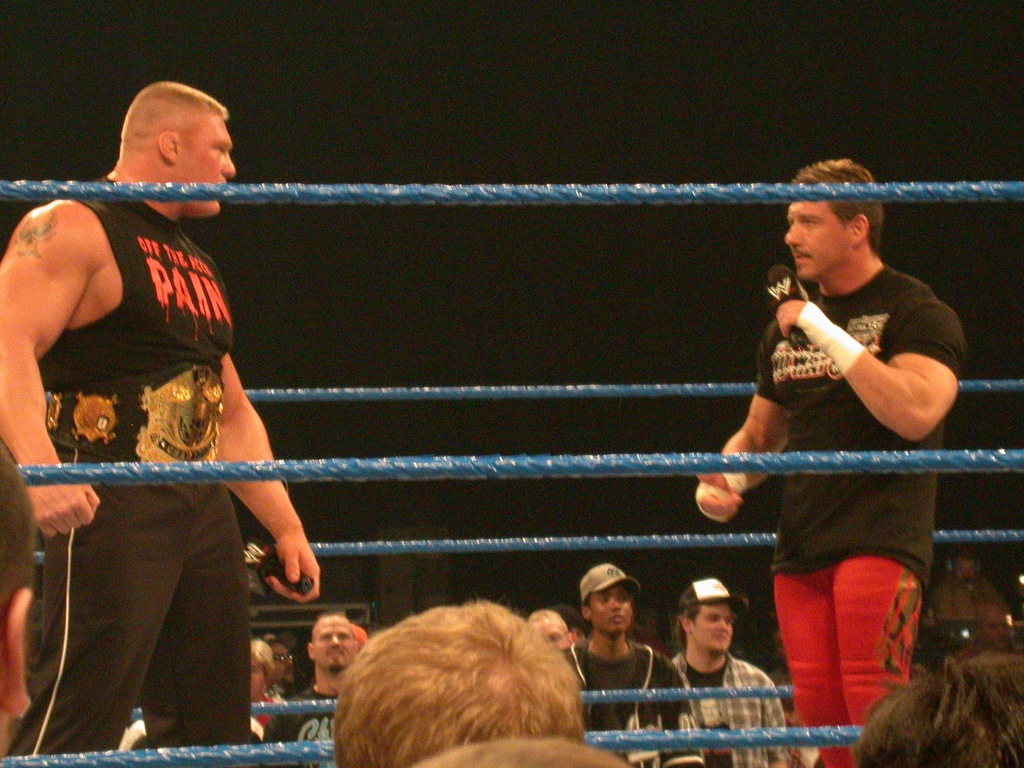
Eddie Guerrero delivering the promo on his struggles with addiction to Brock Lesnar

Meanwhile, Lesnar had also begun feuding with Raw's Goldberg, which began when the two confronted each other at the Royal Rumble. Lesnar interfered in the Royal Rumble match and attacked Goldberg, which caused Goldberg to be eliminated. On January 26 and January 29 Goldberg and Lesnar conducted promos on respective episodes of Raw and SmackDown!, in which they insulted each other. On February 2, Austin gave Goldberg the option of attending No Way Out by giving him a front-row ticket. On the February 5 episode of SmackDown!, the storyline between Guerrero and Lesnar was enhanced when they began a brawl after an in-ring interview segment. On the February 12 episode, Lesnar mocked Guerrero by throwing a mariachi party, which was cut short by Guerrero, who then delivered an emotional promo regarding his struggles with addiction.

On the February 5 episode of SmackDown!, General Manager Paul Heyman scheduled a triple threat match between Big Show, Kurt Angle, and John Cena for No Way Out. The winner of that match would face the WWE Champion at WrestleMania XX for the title. The rivalry continued to develop on the February 12 episode, when Angle was scheduled to team with Guerrero to face Big Show and Lesnar, but was found unconscious backstage. Cena then replaced Angle in the match and defeated Big Show and Lesnar with Guerrero.

In February, Rey Mysterio, the WWE Cruiserweight Champion, produced "Crossing Borders", which was No Way Out's official theme song. In this storyline, Chavo Guerrero became jealous of the attention Mysterio garnered as a result of recording the song. Therefore, Heyman promoted a match between the two at No Way Out for the Cruiserweight Championship during the February 5 episode of SmackDown!. On the February 12 episode, Mysterio was accompanied by Jorge Páez, a professional boxer and childhood friend of Mysterio who appeared in his "Crossing Borders" music video, to his match against Tajiri. Mysterio defeated Tajiri but was attacked by Guerrero and his father Chavo Guerrero, Sr. after the match until Paez intervened and helped Mysterio.

== Event ==
=== Sunday Night Heat ===
Before the event began and aired live on pay-per-view, Tajiri, Sakoda and Akio defeated Último Dragón, Billy Kidman, and Paul London in a 6-Man Tag Team Match on Sunday Night Heat.

=== Preliminary matches ===
Other on-screen personnel
Role:	Name:
English commentators	Michael Cole
English commentators	Tazz
Spanish commentators	Carlos Cabrera
Spanish commentators	Hugo Savinovich
Interviewer	Josh Mathews
Ring announcer	Tony Chimel
Referees	Nick Patrick
Referees	Brian Hebner
Referees	Jimmy Korderas

After Sunday Night Heat, the pay-per-view began with a handicap match that saw Rikishi and Scotty 2 Hotty, the WWE Tag Team Champions, defend their title against Basham Brothers (Doug Basham and Danny Basham) and Shaniqua. During the match Hotty attempted a worm on Shaniqua, but Shaniqua countered by clotheslining Hotty. The challengers had the advantage until Hotty clotheslined the Bashams, causing them to flip over the top ring rope and into ringside. Afterwards, Rikishi delivered a Samoan drop. Rikishi then covered Shaniqua to retain the championship.

Next was a singles match, in which Jamie Noble was blindfolded as he faced his storyline girlfriend Nidia. Nidia would take advantage of Noble's inability to see by performing antics that caused him to fall. Eventually, Noble was able to apply the guillotine choke on Nidia. Noble won the match after he forced her to submit with this move.

The third contest was a tag team match, in which World's Greatest Tag Team (Shelton Benjamin and Charlie Haas) faced the APA (Bradshaw and Faarooq). At one point, Bradshaw performed a clothesline on Haas. Benjamin then delivered a superkick to Bradshaw and pinned him to gain the win for his team. After the match, Goldberg was seen arriving at the arena and being escorted to his seat by arena security. In the ring, SmackDown! General Manager Paul Heyman gave a promotional in-ring segment on how SmackDown! was the better program over Raw. Brock Lesnar would come down to the ring to promote his match and to insult Goldberg. As part of the storyline, Goldberg immediately jumped over the barricade into the ring, where Lesnar performed a spear on Goldberg. However, he recuperated and delivered a Jackhammer to Lesnar. Goldberg was then escorted out of the arena by security.

This altercation was followed by a match between Hardcore Holly and Rhyno. Before the match began, Holly and Rhyno brawled on the entrance ramp, before they entered the ring. Once there, Holly executed a superplex, though, as they recuperated, Rhyno delivered a Gore that caused Holly to roll out of the ring. Afterwards, Holly delivered an Alabama slam for the pinfall.

In the fifth match Rey Mysterio (managed by Jorge Páez) defended his WWE Cruiserweight Championship against Chavo Guerrero (managed by his father Chavo Guerrero, Sr.). During the fight, Mysterio performed a 619 on Guerrero, leading to an attack by Paez on Guerrero, Sr. The referee ordered Paez backstage. Both fighters wrestled inconclusively until Mysterio delivered a second 619. During the second sequence of the move, Guerrero grabbed Mysterio's legs and achieved a position with his shoulders spread so as to win both a pinfall and the WWE Cruiserweight title.

The following match was the triple threat match between Big Show, John Cena and Kurt Angle, with the winner challenging for the WWE Championship at WrestleMania XX. For the duration of the match, The Big Show, who stood at 7 feet 2 inches (2.18 m) and weighed 500 pounds (230 kg), used his body size to his advantage as he squashed, or easily and quickly performed moves on, Cena and Angle. Thereafter, Cena delivered an FU, while Angle threw Big Show out of the ring with an Angle Slam. Angle then applied an ankle lock on Cena, forcing him to submit. As a result, Angle won a WWE Championship match at WrestleMania XX. This match would also be the last time Cena would submit in a match until his retirement match in 2025.

=== Main event match ===
The main event featured Brock Lesnar defending the WWE Championship against Eddie Guerrero. Lesnar used his size advantage over Guerrero throughout the match. However, as Lesnar attempted an F-5 late in the match, he inadvertently took down referee Brian Hebner in the process. Realizing that the referee was out cold, Lesnar left the ring to retrieve his championship. Just as he was about to hit Guerrero with it, Goldberg returned to the arena and speared Lesnar, leaving both competitors and the referee motionless in the ring.

Guerrero was able to revive himself first and slowly crawled over to the fallen champion, covering him. Hebner was able to count to two, but Lesnar's kickout knocked him back down. The challenger then decided to take a page from Lesnar and grabbed the championship belt, with the intent of using it on the champion like Lesnar had tried just moments ago. Guerrero swung at Lesnar after he rose to his feet, but missed.

Lesnar then countered with a boot to the midsection, which caused Guerrero to drop the belt. He then went for a second F-5, but Guerrero was able to counter the move with a tornado DDT and drive Lesnar's head into the championship belt. Guerrero then tossed the belt out of the ring, ascended the ropes, and hit Lesnar with a frog splash for the pin to become a world champion for the first time in his career.

== Reception ==
The Cow Palace arena usually can accommodate 13,000, but the capacity was reduced to 11,000 for No Way Out 2004. This event grossed over $450,000 from an approximate attendance of 11,000 which was the maximum allowed. It also received 350,000 pay-per-view buys. No Way Out helped World Wrestling Entertainment earn $43.7 million in revenue from pay-per-view events versus $31.8 million the previous year; Linda McMahon, then CEO of WWE, confirmed this statement on June 21, 2004, in a quarterly financial report. The event received mostly positive reviews. Canadian Online Explorer's professional wrestling section described the event as "Smackdown! [giving] us our money's worth last night but they also set up what's probably going to be the best match at Wrestlemania." Kevin Sowers from PWTorch described the main event between Eddie Guerrero and Brock Lesnar as "one to remember for a long time." The event was released on DVD on March 16, 2004. After its release, the DVD received a rating of 8.5 out of 10 points by IGN.

== Aftermath ==
At WrestleMania XX, Eddie Guerrero defeated Kurt Angle via pinfall and retained the WWE Championship. John "Bradshaw" Layfield (JBL), portraying a new character after the semi-retirement of his tag team partner Faarooq, challenged Guerrero for the WWE Championship and defeated him at The Great American Bash to win the title. Guerrero failed to recapture the title from JBL in a steel cage match on the July 15 episode of SmackDown!. After Guerrero's death in November 2005, WWE held tribute shows on Raw and SmackDown! During these programs, No Way Out was the main highlight of Guerrero's career, as it was where he won his only world championship.

John Cena began a rivalry with Big Show over his WWE United States Championship and at WrestleMania, Cena defeated Big Show to win the title.

Goldberg and Lesnar continued their rivalry, leading to a match at WrestleMania, in which Goldberg defeated Lesnar. After their match, Goldberg and Lesnar left the company, although Lesnar would make his return in April 2012 and Goldberg made his return in October 2016.

Rey Mysterio and Chavo Guerrero's storyline over the WWE Cruiserweight Championship also continued, culminating in a battle royal match at WrestleMania XX involving other wrestlers. Guerrero last eliminated Mysterio to retain his title in this match.

After the Draft Lottery, a mock sports draft lottery in which wrestlers switched brands, Rico was drafted to SmackDown!, while Shelton Benjamin was drafted to Raw, in the process splitting up The World's Greatest Tag Team. Afterward, Charlie Haas and Rico won the WWE Tag Team Championship from Rikishi and Scotty 2 Hotty on the April 22 episode of SmackDown!.

== Results ==
No.	Results	Stipulations	Times
1^{H}	Akio, Sakoda and Tajiri defeated Billy Kidman, Paul London and Último Dragón	Six-man tag team match	5:35
2	Too Cool (Rikishi and Scotty 2 Hotty) (c) defeated Basham Brothers (Danny Basham and Doug Basham) and Shaniqua	Handicap match for the WWE Tag Team Championship	8:16
3	Jamie Noble defeated Nidia by submission	Singles match with Jamie Noble blindfolded	4:25
4	World's Greatest Tag Team (Shelton Benjamin and Charlie Haas) defeated The APA (Bradshaw and Faarooq)	Tag team match	7:20
5	Hardcore Holly defeated Rhyno	Singles match	9:55
6	Chavo Guerrero (with Chavo Classic) defeated Rey Mysterio (c) (with Jorge Páez)	Singles match for the WWE Cruiserweight Championship	17:21
7	Kurt Angle defeated John Cena and Big Show by submission	Triple threat match to determine the #1 contender to the WWE Championship at WrestleMania XX	12:19
8	Eddie Guerrero defeated Brock Lesnar (c)	Singles match for the WWE Championship	30:07
(c) / – the champion(s) heading into the match; H / – the match was broadcast prior to the pay-per-view on Sunday Night Heat
