= Elimination Chamber (2010) =

World Wrestling Entertainment pay-per-view event

- Promotional poster featuring Batista and the ceiling of the Elimination Chamber structure in his eye.
- Promotion: World Wrestling Entertainment
- Brand(s): Raw; SmackDown
- Date: February 21, 2010
- City: St. Louis, Missouri
- Venue: Scottrade Center
- Attendance: 17,000
- Buy rate: 285,000

Pay-per-view chronology
← Previous; Royal Rumble	Next → WrestleMania XXVI

Elimination Chamber chronology
← Previous; First	Next → 2011

The 2010 Elimination Chamber (known as No Way Out in Germany) was a professional wrestling pay-per-view (PPV) event produced by World Wrestling Entertainment (WWE). It was the inaugural Elimination Chamber and took place on February 21, 2010, at the Scottrade Center in St. Louis, Missouri, held for wrestlers from the promotion's Raw and SmackDown brand divisions. The event centered on the Elimination Chamber match, a type of roofed steel cage that surrounds the ring and ringside area with no disqualifications; the objective is to eliminate all other opponents either by pinfall or submission with championship implications at stake.

Six matches aired during the pay-per-view while one dark match occurred prior to the live broadcast. The two main event matches, one each for Raw and SmackDown, were both contested as Elimination Chamber matches with six competitors each. In SmackDown's Elimination Chamber match, which was the final match on the card, The Undertaker defended the World Heavyweight Championship against Chris Jericho, John Morrison, Rey Mysterio, CM Punk, and R-Truth, which was won by Jericho, who last eliminated Undertaker. In Raw's Elimination Chamber match, Sheamus defended the WWE Championship against Triple H, Ted DiBiase, Randy Orton, John Cena, and Kofi Kingston, which Cena won by last eliminating Triple H. On the undercard, Drew McIntyre retained SmackDown's Intercontinental Championship against Kane, The Miz retained Raw's United States Championship against Montel Vontavious Porter (MVP), and Maryse and Gail Kim competed against LayCool (Layla and Michelle McCool) in an interbrand Divas tag team match.

The event replaced No Way Out as the annual February PPV, which had also featured the Elimination Chamber match on its last two events. This was WWE's first PPV event held following the discontinuation of the ECW brand the week prior. The event received 285,000 pay-per-view buys, an increase on the figure earned by the 2009 No Way Out pay-per-view. Despite the increased number of buys, the event received generally negative reviews, with reviewers criticizing the undercard of the show as being "weak" and consisting of "filler" material.

== Production ==
=== Background ===
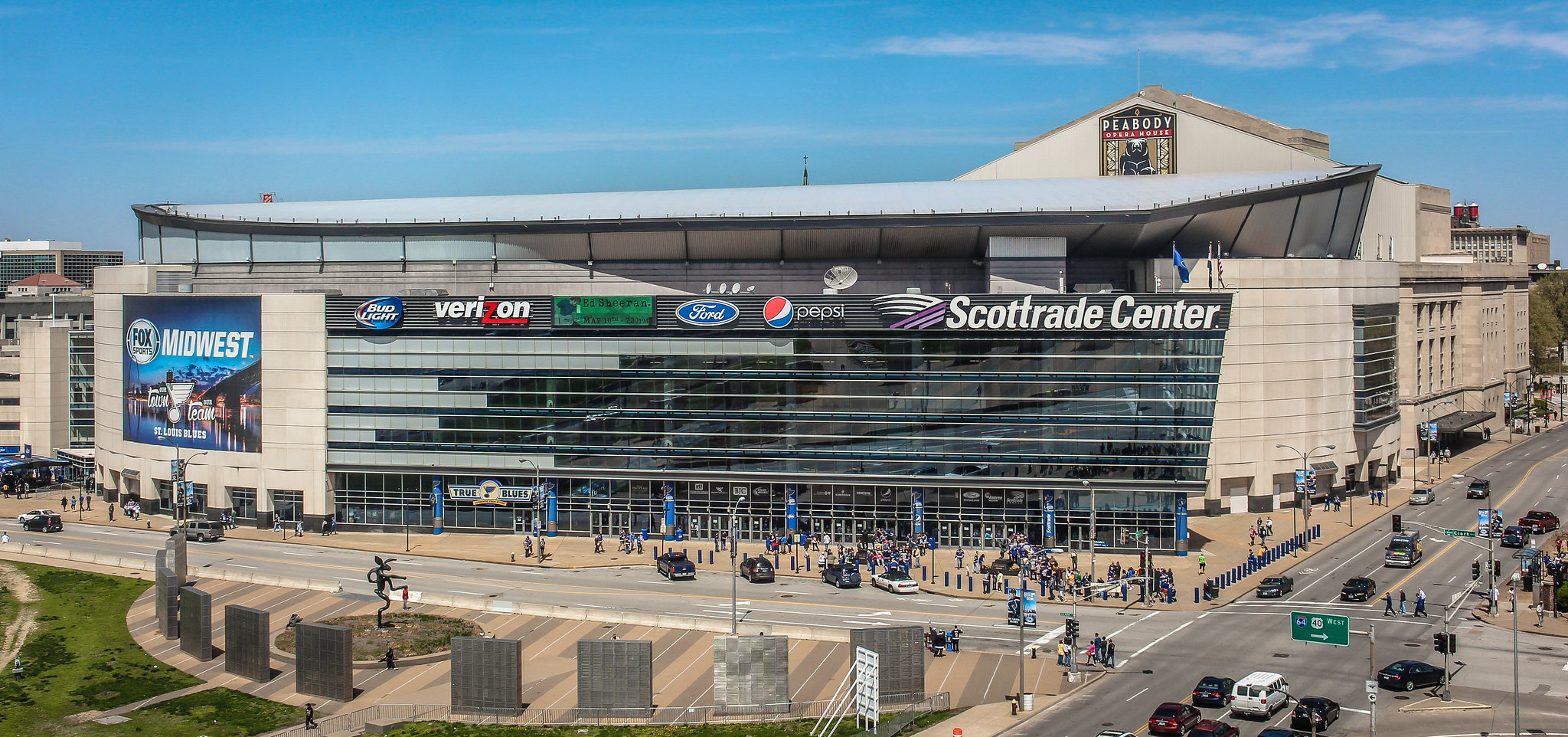
The inaugural Elimination Chamber was held at the Scottrade Center in St. Louis, Missouri.

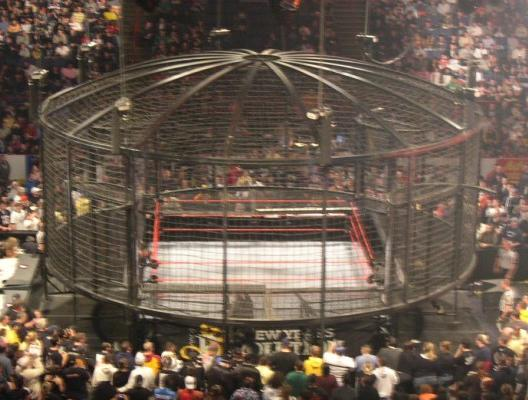
The Elimination Chamber pay-per-view featured two Elimination Chamber matches.

In late 2009, the professional wrestling company World Wrestling Entertainment (WWE) ran a poll on their official website to allow fans to choose the name for the February 2010 pay-per-view (PPV) event, which would feature the Elimination Chamber match. The choices included Elimination Chamber, Heavy Metal, Battle Chamber, Chamber of Conflict, or continuing with No Way Out, which had been the annual February PPV since 2000 and had featured the Elimination Chamber on its last two events. The name Elimination Chamber won, but the event was still promoted as "No Way Out" in Germany as it was feared that the name "Elimination Chamber" may remind people of the gas chambers used during the Holocaust. The event was scheduled to be held on February 21, 2010, at the Scottrade Center in St. Louis, Missouri and featured wrestlers from the Raw and SmackDown brands—this was WWE's first PPV event held following the discontinuation of the ECW brand the week prior.

The Elimination Chamber match was originally created in 2002 and held at various other PPV events, including the preceding two No Way Out events. The Chamber itself is a circular steel cage, consisting of chains and girders that surrounds the ring. Four pods are enclosed within the chamber, one behind each ring post, which are on a steel platform surrounding the outside of the ring. Typically six wrestlers compete in the match; two start the match while the other four are enclosed within the pods and released at random at specific time intervals. Wrestlers can only be eliminated via pinfall or submission, and the last wrestler left is the winner. For the Elimination Chamber pay-per-view, both of WWE's world championships—Raw's WWE Championship and SmackDown's World Heavyweight Championship—were scheduled to be defended in separate Elimination Chamber matches.

=== Storylines ===
The professional wrestling matches at Elimination Chamber featured professional wrestlers performing as characters in scripted events pre-determined by the hosting promotion, WWE. Storylines between the characters were produced on WWE's weekly television shows, Raw and SmackDown of the Raw and SmackDown brands—storyline divisions in which WWE assigned its employees to different programs.

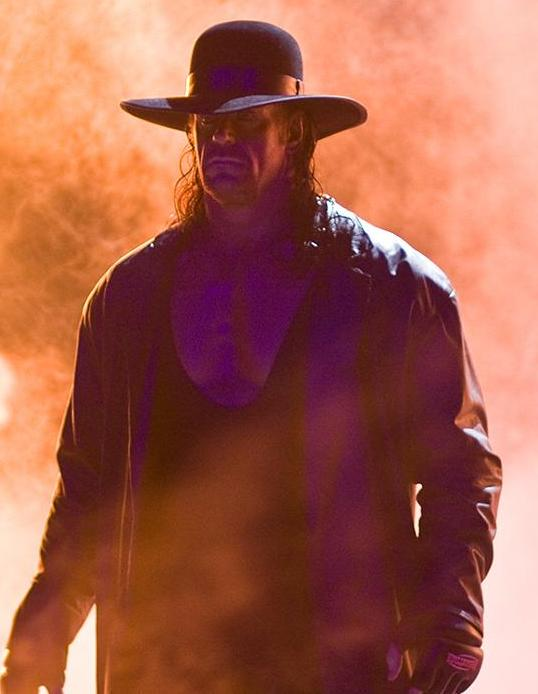
The Undertaker defended SmackDown's World Heavyweight Championship in an Elimination Chamber match.

The main event matches for the Elimination Chamber event consisted of two Elimination Chamber matches, with Raw's WWE Championship defended in one and SmackDown's World Heavyweight Championship defended in the other. Qualifying matches were held on the February 1 episode of Raw to determine the five challengers who would face the WWE Champion Sheamus in Raw's Elimination Chamber match. In qualifiers, John Cena defeated Cody Rhodes, Triple H defeated Jack Swagger, Randy Orton defeated Shawn Michaels, Ted DiBiase defeated Mark Henry, and Kofi Kingston defeated The Big Show by disqualification. In the weeks prior to Elimination Chamber the participants faced off in several matches, which included DiBiase vs. Cena ending in a no contest, Sheamus defeating Orton by disqualification, DiBiase defeating Kingston via pinfall, and Cena vs. Triple H ending in a no contest due to Sheamus interfering and attacking both participants. The February 5 episode of SmackDown saw the five wrestlers qualify to challenge The Undertaker for the World Heavyweight Championship in a similar fashion. John Morrison defeated Drew McIntyre and Kane in a triple threat match. Throughout the rest of the episode, this was followed by R-Truth defeating Mike Knox, CM Punk defeating Batista via countout, Chris Jericho defeating Matt Hardy, and Rey Mysterio defeating Dolph Ziggler. In the following weeks, the six wrestlers faced off in different combinations in singles matches that saw Mysterio pin Punk, Morrison vs. R-Truth end in a no contest due to Morrison suffering a storyline ankle injury, and Jericho defeating The Undertaker. On the February 19 episode of SmackDown, Morrison and R-Truth teamed up to face CM Punk and his 'follower' Luke Gallows in a tag team match, which Morrison and R-Truth lost via referee stoppage.

In late December 2009, WWE Divas Champion Melina tore her anterior cruciate ligament, and was forced to vacate the championship. As a result, it was announced in January 2010 that a single-elimination tournament would be held to determine a new champion. The tournament began on the January 4 episode of Raw, when Maryse advanced to the semi-finals by defeating Brie Bella. She was followed into the semi-finals by Gail Kim, Alicia Fox, and Eve, who defeated Jillian Hall, Kelly Kelly, and Katie Lea Burchill respectively. In the semi-finals, Maryse defeated Eve and Kim defeated Fox. It was then announced on the February 8 episode of Raw that Maryse and Kim would face one another in the final at the Elimination Chamber pay-per-view.

On the February 12 episode of SmackDown, WWE Intercontinental Champion Drew McIntyre faced Kane in a non-title match. After the match went to a double-countout, Kane chokeslammed McIntyre. It was announced the following day on WWE's official website that Kane and McIntyre would meet at Elimination Chamber for the Intercontinental Championship. The following week, on the February 19 episode of SmackDown, Kane defeated Dolph Ziggler in a singles match. Following the match, he was attacked by McIntyre, but Kane was able to fight back and fend off the attack.

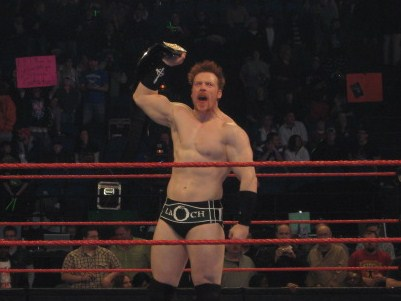
Sheamus, who defended Raw's WWE Championship inside the Elimination Chamber.

== Event ==
Other on-screen personnel
Role:	Name:
English commentators	Michael Cole
English commentators	Jerry Lawler
English commentators	Matt Striker
Spanish commentators	Carlos Cabrera
Spanish commentators	Hugo Savinovich
Ring announcers	Tony Chimel (SmackDown)
Ring announcers	Justin Roberts (Raw)
Backstage interviewer	Josh Mathews
Referees	Charles Robinson
Referees	John Cone
Referees	Jack Doan

Prior to the live broadcast of the pay-per-view, Christian defeated Ezekiel Jackson in a singles match by pinfall.

=== Preliminary matches ===
The first match that aired on the pay-per-view was the main event of Raw, which was an Elimination Chamber match for the WWE Championship, which involved Randy Orton, Triple H, Ted DiBiase, Kofi Kingston, John Cena, and defending champion Sheamus. Cena, DiBiase, Orton and Triple H all made their entrances and entered their pods individually, leaving Kingston and Sheamus to start the match. Sheamus attempted to finish Kingston off early by executing a Brogue Kick, but Kingston avoided it and immediately began attacking him. Sheamus would eventually get the advantage. After around five minutes, Triple H's pod opened first and immediately set his sights on Sheamus. After a back and forth between the three men. Orton's pod opened and he quickly attacked the three men, five minutes would pass and DiBiase's pod opened. Orton and DiBiase worked together to take out Kingston and Triple H (The latter would receive a DDT on the chamber floor, taking him out for majority of the match.) Orton and DiBiase began staring down on Cena, who was still in his pod. When Cena's pod opened, Cena would manage to get the upper hand for a while before eventually getting taken out by Orton. As Orton prepared to eliminate Cena, Cody Rhodes, an ally of both DiBiase and Orton appeared and tried to help Orton by giving him a steel pipe, but Orton refused. Rhodes would throw the pipe in anyway, leading to DiBiase to take it instead. DiBiase tried to hit Cena with the pipe but struck Orton instead. Cena performed an Attitude Adjustment on Orton. DiBiase struck Cena with the pipe, and then covered Orton to eliminate him, leaving Rhodes stunned. Kingston performed his finishing move "Trouble in Paradise" to eliminate DiBiase. Immediately afterwards, Sheamus eliminated Kingston after a High Cross. Sheamus tried to plant Cena with a High Cross, but Triple H emerged and hit a low blow on Sheamus, Triple H would then deliver a Pedigree to Sheamus, which would eliminate him. This left Triple H and Cena as the final two, guaranteeing a new WWE Champion. Both men slowly attempted to pick themselves up, with Cena managing to apply his submission hold, the STF. This forced Triple H to tap out, finally ending the match and leading to Cena winning the title, his eighth world championship overall.

Immediately after the conclusion of the match, WWE Chairman Vince McMahon told Cena that he would be going to WrestleMania XXVI, only if he could beat Batista, and then ordered Cena to face Batista in an impromptu match for the WWE Championship. Batista speared Cena and then performed a "Batista Bomb" on him to earn the pinfall victory, making Batista the new WWE Champion.

The third match featured Drew McIntyre defending the WWE Intercontinental Championship against Kane. The match began with Kane taking the advantage over McIntyre by clotheslining him over the top rope to the floor. Towards the end of the match, McIntyre attempted to leave the arena and lose via countout, which would have allowed him to retain the championship, but Kane brought him back inside the ring. When re-entering the ring, McIntyre poked him in the eye and then performed his "Future Shock DDT" to win the match by pinfall and remain the Intercontinental Champion.

=== Main event matches ===
The next match was scheduled to be the final of a tournament to determine a new Divas Champion after the title was vacated. Maryse and Gail Kim had entered the ring when official consultant to the SmackDown General Manager, Vickie Guerrero interrupted. Guerrero stated that as a result of the Raw Divas making disparaging remarks about the SmackDown Divas, she was changing the match to an interbrand Divas tag team match, with Raw Divas Kim and Maryse facing LayCool (Michelle McCool and Layla) from SmackDown. The story of the match was that Maryse and Kim could not work together, and Maryse attacked Kim, allowing McCool to hit her finishing move for the victory. Following the match, Maryse performed her "French Kiss DDT" on Kim. Following the match, The Miz was interviewed backstage by Josh Mathews about NXT, on which he was a mentor. He was interrupted by Montel Vontavious Porter, who informed The Miz that the two had a match next. This was followed by William Regal cutting an in-ring promo about NXT. He was interrupted by the winner of the 2010 Royal Rumble match, Edge, who stated that he would be deciding which championship to challenge for at WrestleMania on the next episode of Raw. Edge then speared Regal.

The fifth match was a previously unannounced contest which saw The Miz defend his WWE United States Championship against Montel Vontavious Porter (MVP). The Miz was accompanied by his tag team partner, The Big Show, while MVP was accompanied by Mark Henry, with whom he had regularly teamed. MVP took the advantage at the beginning of the match, before The Miz was able to fight back with a swinging DDT. When he climbed to the top rope, however, MVP knocked him off to regain the advantage. The Big Show pulled The Miz out of the ring to safety and then threw Henry into the security barricade at ringside. With the referee distracted by this, The Big Show used his "Knockout Punch" on MVP, and The Miz was able to pin him to retain his championship.

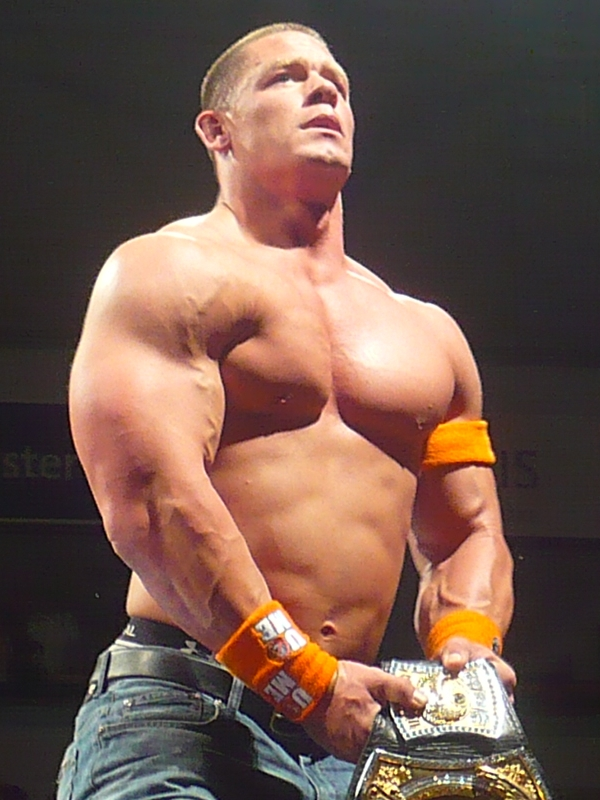
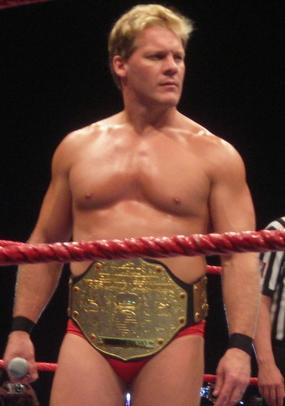
John Cena won Raw's Elimination Chamber match for the WWE Championship, while Chris Jericho won SmackDown's for the World Heavyweight Championship

The final match of the pay-per-view was the SmackDown Elimination Chamber match for the World Heavyweight Championship, which was SmackDown's main event, featuring The Undertaker, CM Punk, Rey Mysterio, Chris Jericho, John Morrison, and R-Truth. Mysterio, Morrison, and Jericho entered first and were locked into pods. The Undertaker was the fourth to make his way down to the ring, but an accident occurred during his entrance when his pyrotechnics were mistimed, resulting in him being momentarily engulfed in flames. He was cleared by a ringside doctor to wrestle, however, and was able to compete in the match. The final two, who were to start the match, were CM Punk, who was accompanied by his stable, the Straight Edge Society of Serena and Luke Gallows, and R-Truth. Punk cut a promo on his way to the ring, but was interrupted by R-Truth's entrance. Punk was able to eliminate R-Truth in approximately three-and-a-half minutes, before any other competitor had entered the match, and finished his promo afterward. Mysterio entered after the first five minutes had passed, and eliminated Punk before the next competitor entered. The next entrant was revealed to be Jericho, and he and Mysterio wrestled for five minutes until Morrison was released. Morrison utilised his "Starship Pain" finisher to pin Mysterio and eliminate him from the match. The final entrant into the match was the defending champion The Undertaker, who was able to eliminate Morrison following a chokeslam onto the chamber floor after approximately 28 minutes, leaving The Undertaker and Jericho as the final two. Both men managed to land most of their signature moves on each other, with Jericho getting numerous near-falls on The Undertaker. The Undertaker Managed to fight back and perform his signature Last Ride maneuver on Jericho. As The Undertaker began to pick Jericho up, Shawn Michaels, who had requested and been denied a match with The Undertaker for WrestleMania, snuck into the chamber, and performed his "Sweet Chin Music" on The Undertaker. This allowed a shocked Jericho to pin The Undertaker to win the match and the World Heavyweight Championship for the third time.

== Pyrotechnics accident ==
Just prior to the commencement of the World Heavyweight Championship Elimination Chamber match, The Undertaker was involved in a pyrotechnics accident during his ring entrance. He was temporarily engulfed in flames on three occasions when the pyrotechnics were mistimed, and his jacket briefly caught on fire. He suffered first- and second-degree burns to his neck and chest, and according to a WWE spokesperson the injury "looked like a bad sunburn". He was only allowed to participate in the match after being cleared by a ringside doctor and was given bottles of water throughout the match to douse himself with to alleviate the discomfort. Chris Jericho, who also competed in the match, has told on multiple occasions how the pyrotechnician responsible was relieved of his employment with WWE and escorted from the arena following a threat of violence from The Undertaker. The Undertaker himself explained that he had previously expressed concerns to the technician regarding the pyro arrangement, but was ignored. He feels he was saved from severe injury by applying water to his hair, and altering his attire from a sleeveless to a sleeved jacket, just minutes before the accident.

== Reception ==
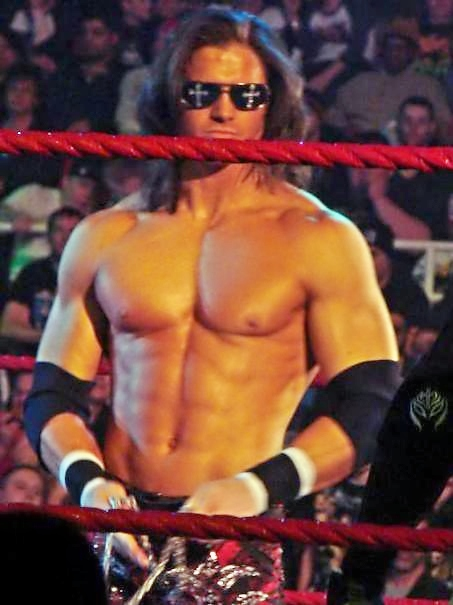
John Morrison was praised for his performance in SmackDown's Elimination Chamber match.

The event received generally negative reviews. Writing for Canadian Online Explorer's wrestling section, Dale Plummer and Nick Tylwalk also slammed the Divas match, rating it 0.5 out of 10, and stating that it "was pretty much a complete waste of time", a sentiment echoed by the Pro Wrestling Torch's James Caldwell, who stated that the match was a "throwaway". The non-Elimination Chamber matches on the show were mostly derided as being unimportant, with The Baltimore Sun's reviewer Kevin Eck stating that they "came off as filler".

Caldwell said that Morrison had "some standout moments" throughout the match. Wrestling journalist Dave Meltzer praised the United States Championship match between The Miz and Montel Vontavious Porter, stating that it was "good". Eck agreed, stating that it was "the best of the three non-chamber matches".

Overall, Plummer and Tylwalk rated the event 5 out of 10, stating that it was "a strangely paced, uneven affair that dragged between its pair of namesake matches", but that it succeeded in building up matches for WrestleMania. Caldwell also criticised the pay-per-view heavily, stating that it was an "underwhelming overall PPV with a weak, weak mid-card".

17,000 people attended Elimination Chamber at the Scottrade Center, drawing a gate of US$850,000. The event received 285,000 buys on pay-per-view, an increase of 13,000 compared to No Way Out 2009's 272,000 buys. The DVD of the event was released on March 23, 2010.

== Aftermath ==
=== Raw ===
Following his interference in the Elimination Chamber match to prevent The Undertaker from winning, Shawn Michaels cut a promo on the next episode of Raw, stating that he interfered so that The Undertaker would agree to a rematch at WrestleMania XXVI to get revenge. The Undertaker accepted the match on the condition that if Michaels lost, he would have to retire, to which Michaels agreed. Two weeks later, the pair agreed to make the match a no countout, no disqualification match.

After Batista won the WWE Championship from John Cena at Elimination Chamber, Cena requested a rematch. Mr. McMahon agreed, on the condition that Cena must defeat Batista in a non-title match that night on Raw. Batista intentionally low-blowed Cena during the match to get disqualified and set up their match at WrestleMania. To build up their match, Batista interfered in several of Cena's matches in the weeks prior to WrestleMania, both attacking Cena or distracting him so that his opponent could gain the advantage.

Tension within The Legacy faction had been growing since Cody Rhodes and Ted DiBiase accidentally cost Randy Orton the WWE Championship at the Royal Rumble. After DiBiase eliminated Orton from the Elimination Chamber match, with the help of Rhodes, Orton turned on Rhodes and DiBiase, and attacked them during a six-man tag team match causing The Legacy to lose. In the following weeks, Orton faced DiBiase in a singles match and DiBiase and Rhodes in a two-on-one handicap match, until the guest host of Raw, Steve Austin, booked a triple threat match between Orton, Rhodes, and DiBiase for WrestleMania.

After being eliminated from the Elimination Chamber match by Triple H, Sheamus attacked him on the March 1 episode of Raw in retaliation. The following week, Sheamus challenged Triple H to a match at WrestleMania, which Triple H accepted. On the final episode of Raw before WrestleMania, Sheamus teamed up with Cody Rhodes and Ted DiBiase to defeat Triple H and Randy Orton in a two-on-three handicap match.

=== SmackDown ===
Edge returned from injury at the Royal Rumble as a surprise entrant in the Royal Rumble match, which he won, earning a guaranteed match for any WWE world championship. Following Jericho's victory in the Elimination Chamber, in which he won the World Heavyweight Championship, Edge speared him the following night on Raw and announced that he had elected to face Jericho at WrestleMania. Following this announcement, Edge began a campaign of surprise attacks on Jericho, spearing him on several occasions in an attempt to play mind games with Jericho. On the March 12 episode of SmackDown, Jericho hosted a special edition of his talk show segment, The Highlight Reel, with Edge as the guest. Edge attempted to spear Jericho again, but Jericho was able to avoid it and hit Edge with the World Heavyweight Championship belt instead.

=== Future ===
The 2010 event became the first of what is now one of WWE's annual events. An Elimination Chamber event has occurred every year since except in 2016. It has also mostly occurred in February, except for the 2015 event, which was held in May, and the 2020 and 2025 events held in March. While originally designed for single competitors, the first tag team Elimination Chamber match occurred at the 2015 event. The chamber itself was redesigned for the 2017 event, becoming square in design. A women's version of the match first occurred at the 2018 event, which also featured the first seven-man Chamber match (in a seven-person version, three wrestlers begin the match instead of two). Additionally, while Elimination Chamber had replaced No Way Out, one further No Way Out event was held in June 2012.

== Results ==
No.	Results	Stipulations	Times
1^{D}	Christian defeated Ezekiel Jackson by pinfall	Singles match	11:26
2	John Cena defeated Triple H, Sheamus (c), Kofi Kingston, Ted DiBiase Jr., and Randy Orton	Raw's Elimination Chamber match for the WWE Championship	30:30
3	Batista defeated John Cena (c) by pinfall	Singles match for the WWE Championship	0:32
4	Drew McIntyre (c) defeated Kane by pinfall	Singles match for the WWE Intercontinental Championship	10:06
5	LayCool (Layla and Michelle McCool) defeated Gail Kim and Maryse by pinfall	Tag team match	3:35
6	The Miz (c) (with Big Show) defeated Montel Vontavious Porter (with Mark Henry) by pinfall	Singles match for the WWE United States Championship	13:02
7	Chris Jericho defeated The Undertaker (c), John Morrison, Rey Mysterio, CM Punk (with Luke Gallows and Serena), and R-Truth	SmackDown's Elimination Chamber match for the World Heavyweight Championship	41:49
(c) / – the champion(s) heading into the match; D / – this was a dark match

=== Elimination Chamber entrances and eliminations (Raw) ===
Eliminated	Wrestler	Entered	Eliminated by	Method	Times
1	Randy Orton	4	Ted DiBiase	Pinned after Dibiase hit Orton with a steel pipe	23:56
2	Ted DiBiase	5	Kofi Kingston	Trouble In Paradise	25:24
3	Kofi Kingston	2	Sheamus	High Cross	26:02
4	Sheamus (c)	1	Triple H	Pedigree	28:38
5	Triple H	3	John Cena	STF	30:30
Winner	John Cena	6			30:30

=== Elimination Chamber entrances and eliminations (SmackDown) ===
Eliminated	Wrestler	Entered	Eliminated by	Method	Times
1	R-Truth	1	CM Punk	GTS	03:34
2	CM Punk	2	Rey Mysterio	Slingshot Splash	09:58
3	Rey Mysterio	3	John Morrison	Starship Pain	20:00
4	John Morrison	5	The Undertaker	Pinned after Undertaker performed a Chokeslam onto the steel flooring	28:24
5	The Undertaker (c)	6	Chris Jericho	Pinned after Shawn Michaels snuck into the pod and hit Sweet Chin Music on Undertaker	41:49
Winner	Chris Jericho	4			41:49
