= No Way Out (2009) =

World Wrestling Entertainment pay-per-view event

- Promotional poster featuring Vladimir Kozlov and a part of the Elimination Chamber structure.
- Promotion: World Wrestling Entertainment
- Brand(s): Raw; SmackDown; ECW
- Date: February 15, 2009
- City: Seattle, Washington
- Venue: KeyArena
- Attendance: 11,200
- Buy rate: 272,000

Pay-per-view chronology
← Previous; Royal Rumble	Next → WrestleMania 25

No Way Out chronology
← Previous; 2008	Next → 2012

The 2009 No Way Out was a professional wrestling pay-per-view (PPV) event produced by World Wrestling Entertainment (WWE). It was the 11th No Way Out and took place on February 15, 2009, at the KeyArena in Seattle, Washington, held for wrestlers from the promotion's Raw, SmackDown, and ECW brand divisions. This was the final No Way Out held until June 2012 as the event's February slot was replaced by Elimination Chamber in 2010. This would also be the final No Way Out to occur during a brand split, as the first brand extension ended in August 2011.

The main events for the Raw and SmackDown brands were their at-the-time annual Elimination Chamber matches for their respective world championships. The WWE Championship was contested for in the SmackDown main event with champion Edge defending against Jeff Hardy, Triple H, The Undertaker, Big Show, and Vladimir Kozlov. Triple H emerged victorious by eliminating Undertaker last. Later in the evening, the World Heavyweight Championship was on the line in the Raw main event. The match was to originally feature champion John Cena defend against Kane, Rey Mysterio, Mike Knox, Chris Jericho, and Kofi Kingston. However, as Kingston was making his way to the structure, he was attacked by Edge and taken out of the match. Edge then assumed Kingston's place in the match and won by eliminating Mysterio last, resulting in two of WWE's world championships belonging to members of the SmackDown brand.

The ECW brand's lone match saw Jack Swagger defend the ECW Championship successfully against Finlay. The remaining matches on the card were all from the Raw brand and saw Randy Orton defeat Shane McMahon in a No Holds Barred match signed after Shane got revenge against Orton for an attack on his father Vince McMahon, and Shawn Michaels defeated John "Bradshaw" Layfield (JBL) in a match where Michaels would gain financial freedom from JBL if he won but would become a permanent employee of JBL if he lost.

== Production ==
=== Background ===
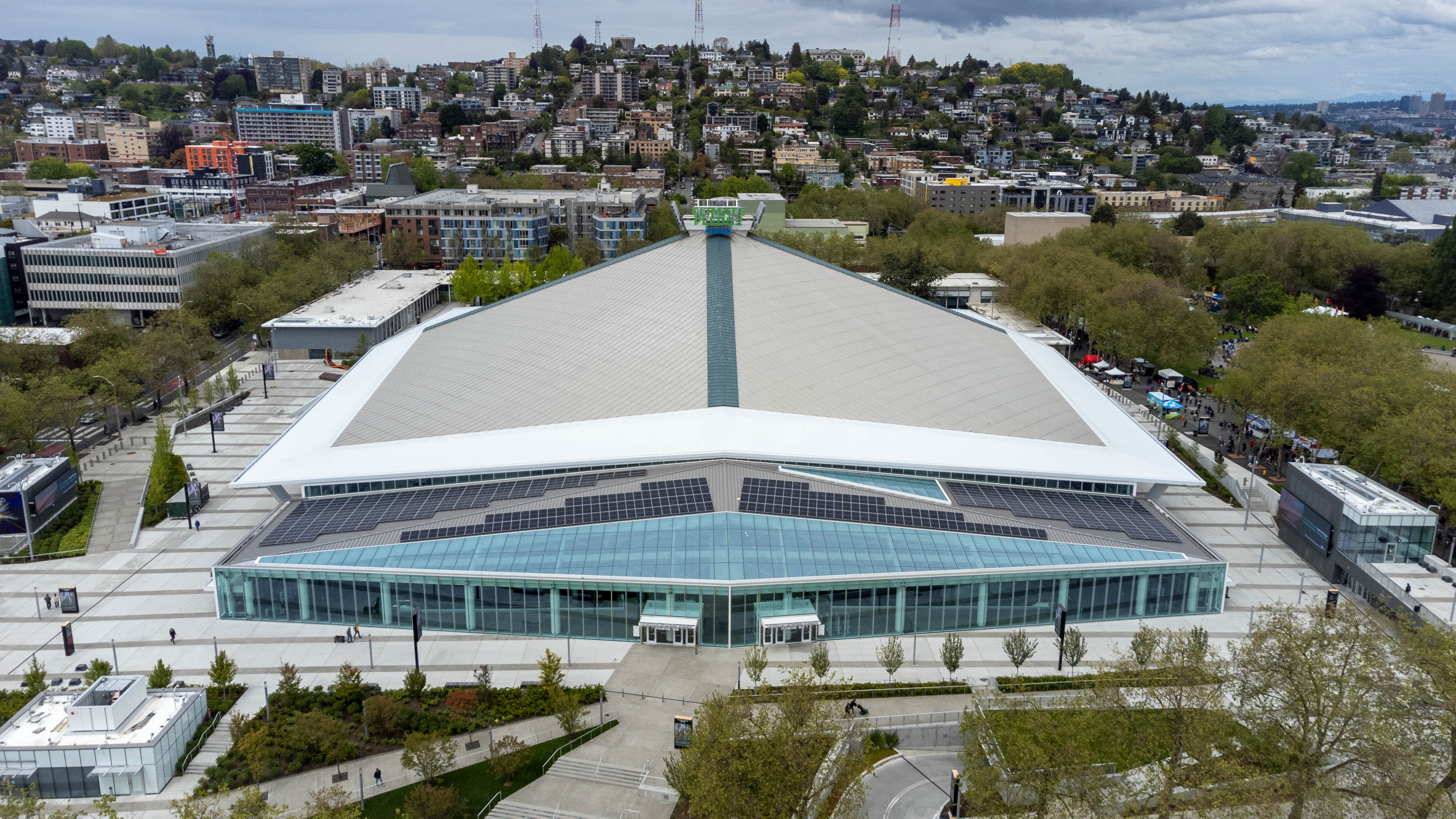
The 11th No Way Out was held at the KeyArena in Seattle, Washington.

No Way Out was a professional wrestling pay-per-view (PPV) event first held by World Wrestling Entertainment (WWE) as the 20th In Your House PPV event in February 1998. Following the discontinuation of the In Your House series in February 1999, No Way Out was reinstated in February 2000 as its own PPV event, thus establishing it as the annual February PPV for the promotion. The 11th event was held on February 15, 2009, at the KeyArena in Seattle, Washington, and featured wrestlers from the Raw, SmackDown, and ECW brand divisions. Tickets went on sale on October 11, 2008, via Ticketmaster.

=== Storylines ===
No Way Out featured professional wrestling matches that involve different wrestlers from pre-existing scripted feuds, plots, and storylines that were played out on Monday Night Raw, Friday Night SmackDown, and ECW on Sci Fi—WWE's primary television programs. All wrestlers were from WWE's Raw, SmackDown, and ECW brands—a storyline division in which WWE employees are assigned to a television program of the same name.

At the Royal Rumble the prior month, it was announced that two Elimination Chamber matches would be held at No Way Out, in which SmackDown's WWE Championship would be defended in one and Raw's World Heavyweight Championship in the other. Qualifying matches for Raw's Elimination Chamber began on the January 26 episode of Raw, in which Kofi Kingston defeated Kane, Rey Mysterio defeated William Regal, and Chris Jericho defeated CM Punk. Mike Knox would later qualify by winning a six-man battle royal at a live event on February 2. Kane was announced as the final participant by Raw General Manager Stephanie McMahon in exchange for Kane convincing the Undertaker to face Randy Orton in a match the next week on Raw. Qualifying matches for SmackDown's Elimination Chamber match began on the January 30 episode of SmackDown, in which The Undertaker defeated Mark Henry; The Big Show defeated Festus; and Triple H defeated Vladimir Kozlov and The Great Khali in a triple threat match; SmackDown General Manager Vickie Guerrero announced that since Jeff Hardy lost the WWE Championship to Edge at the Royal Rumble, Hardy's rematch clause for the championship would be used to include him in the Elimination Chamber match. Vladimir Kozlov, the last entrant, won a battle royal to qualify.

After Randy Orton punted WWE Chairman Vince McMahon, he threatened legal action (kayfabe) against the promotion if he were fired, due to the fact he had won the 2009 Royal Rumble and therefore he was guaranteed a world championship match at WrestleMania 25. So Vince's son Shane retaliated by returning and attacking Orton on the January 26 episode of Raw. Orton's lawyers proposed a challenge from Orton to Shane for a No Holds Barred match at No Way Out, which Shane accepted.

Another rivalry from the Raw brand heading into No Way Out was between Shawn Michaels and John "Bradshaw" Layfield (JBL). At WWE's December pay-per-view, Armageddon, Michaels was engaged in a narrative in which he announced that he was in need of money to support his family and hence, had agreed to work for JBL. JBL began using Michaels to help him become the World Heavyweight Champion, but all of Michaels' efforts failed. On the February 2, 2009, episode of Raw, JBL challenged Michaels to a match at No Way Out, stipulating that should Michaels win, he would be freed from JBL's employment with all the money JBL has promised him, but if Michaels lost, JBL would have gained ownership of Michaels' name and likeness.

The main rivalry from the ECW brand was between Jack Swagger and Finlay, who were battling over the ECW Championship. On the February 3 episode of ECW, Finlay defeated Swagger in a non-title match to hand the latter his first defeat in a singles match via pinfall in his WWE career. The next day on WWE.com, it was announced that Swagger would defend his ECW Championship against Finlay at No Way Out.

== Event ==
Other on-screen personnel
Role:	Name:
English commentators	Michael Cole (Raw)
English commentators	Jerry "The King" Lawler (Raw)
English commentators	Jim Ross (SmackDown)
English commentators	Tazz (SmackDown)
English commentators	Todd Grisham (ECW)
English commentators	Matt Striker (ECW)
Spanish commentators	Carlos Cabrera
Spanish commentators	Hugo Savinovich
Interviewers	Todd Grisham
Ring announcer	Lillian Garcia (Raw)
Ring announcer	Justin Roberts (SmackDown)
Ring announcer	Tony Chimel (ECW)
Referees	Charles Robinson
Referees	Mike Chioda
Referees	Jack Doan
Referees	Marty Elias
Referees	Chad Patton

Before the event aired live on pay-per-view, a dark match took place in which Melina defeated Beth Phoenix to retain the WWE Women's Championship.

=== Preliminary matches ===
The event opened with the Elimination Chamber match for the WWE Championship which was the main event of SmackDown, involving Edge, Jeff Hardy, Triple H, The Undertaker, Big Show, and Vladimir Kozlov. Edge and Hardy were the first two entrants. Almost three minutes into the match, Edge attempted a Spear on Hardy, who pinned Edge with a Small Package to eliminate him. Kozlov entered at #3, Big Show entered at #4, Triple H entered at #5 and The Undertaker entered at #6. The Undertaker performed a Last Ride on Kozlov to eliminate him, becoming the first man in WWE to pin Kozlov. The Undertaker then superplexed Big Show from the top turnbuckle, following which Triple H performed a Pedigree on Big Show and Hardy performed a Swanton Bomb off a pod on Big Show. Triple H then pinned Big Show to eliminate him. The Undertaker performed a Tombstone Piledriver on Hardy to eliminate him. The Undertaker performed a Tombstone Piledriver on Triple H, who placed his foot on the bottom rope to void the pinfall at a two count. Triple H performed a pedigree on The Undertaker for a near-fall. Triple H performed a second Pedigree on The Undertaker to win the WWE Championship for a record-setting eighth time, his 13th World Championship overall.

The second match was a No Holds Barred match between Randy Orton and Shane McMahon. During the match, a trash can, an exposed turnbuckle and a Kendo Stick were all used as weapons. McMahon hit Orton with a television monitor, causing Orton to bleed. Cody Rhodes and Ted DiBiase interfered, attacking McMahon. Rhodes attempted to hit McMahon with a chair but accidentally hit DiBiase with the chair, allowing McMahon to perform a DDT on DiBiase onto the chair. McMahon performed a Coast-To-Coast into a Trash Can was placed in front of Rhodes. McMahon attempted a Leap of Faith on Orton through an announc table, but Orton avoided it and McMahon fell through the table. Orton performed a Superplex on McMahon through a table for a near-fall. Orton performed an RKO on McMahon to win the match.

The third match was for the ECW Championship between Jack Swagger and Finlay. Throughout the match, Hornswoggle, who was in Finlay's corner, attempted to distract Swagger. Swagger performed a Gutwrench Powerbomb on Finlay to retain the title.

The fourth match was an All or Nothing match between Shawn Michaels and John "Bradshaw" Layfield (JBL). Michaels performed Sweet Chin Music on JBL to win the match.

=== Main event ===
The main event of Raw was an Elimination Chamber match for the World Heavyweight Championship, scheduled to involve John Cena, Rey Mysterio, Chris Jericho, Kofi Kingston, Mike Knox, and Kane. Before the match, Edge attacked Kingston and performed a Con-Chair-To on Kingston while he was out cold on the steel steps. Edge then locked himself in a chamber pod, thus replacing Kingston in the match. Jericho entered at #1, Mysterio entered at #2 and Kane entered at #3. Kane was eliminated by Mysterio after a Diving Seated Senton off a chamber pod after everything Kane put Mysterio through. Knox entered at #4. Knox was eliminated by Jericho after a Codebreaker. Edge entered at #5 and Cena entered at #6. Cena was eliminated by Edge after a Codebreaker from Jericho, a 619 from Mysterio and a Spear from Edge, guaranteeing a new World Heavyweight Champion. Jericho was eliminated by Mysterio after Mysterio pinned Jericho with a double leg cradle after countering the Walls of Jericho. Mysterio was eliminated by Edge after a Spear, meaning Edge won the match and the World Heavyweight Championship.

== Reception ==
No Way Out was generally well received by critics. John Canton of TJR Wrestling rated the WWE Championship and World Heavyweight Championship a 4.5 star and a 4 star out of 5 stars respectively, these are the two highest rated matches from the event. The event had 272,000 buys, down on the No Way Out 2008 figure of 329,000 buys.

== Aftermath ==
=== Raw ===
Randy Orton continued his feud with the McMahon family, after No Way Out. On the very next night on Raw, Orton faced Shane McMahon in an unsanctioned match, before both Cody Rhodes and Ted DiBiase had to interfered in the match, after the interference, Orton then punted Shane. When Raw General Manager Stephanie McMahon came out to check on Shane's condition and confront Orton, he attacked her with an RKO, that brought out the furious Triple H to the ring to check on his wife and led to him seeking revenge on Orton any way that he could. On the March 2 episode of Raw, Orton (who was the winner of the Royal Rumble) was goaded by Triple H into choosing to face him in the main event of WrestleMania 25 for the WWE Championship.

With their feud now over, Shawn Michaels and John "Bradshaw" Layfield went in different directions. JBL went on to feud with CM Punk over the WWE Intercontinental Championship, which he won on the March 9 episode of Raw to become the ninth Grand Slam winner in company history. Michaels, meanwhile, began feuding with The Undertaker in an effort to set up a match between the two of them for WrestleMania, which eventually took place.

=== SmackDown ===
Also on the same night, after No Way Out, Edge revealed that he entered the second Elimination Chamber match with the approval of his (kayfabe) wife, SmackDown General Manager Vickie Guerrero. John Cena then invoked his rematch clause, but Edge chose not to defend the title on that night and returned to SmackDown with it. Cena and Edge were eventually signed to face off in a triple threat match for the World Heavyweight Championship at WrestleMania with Big Show (who was Edge and Guerrero's ally), as their third opponent.

=== Future ===
This was the final No Way Out held until June 2012. In September 2009, WWE ran a poll on their website to decide a new name for No Way Out. Elimination Chamber was chosen as the new name for the February 2010 event, but WWE in turn decided to end the No Way Out chronology with Elimination Chamber becoming the new February PPV. This would also be the final No Way Out to occur during a brand split, as the first brand extension ended in August 2011.

== Results ==
No.	Results	Stipulations	Times
1^{D}	Melina (c) defeated Beth Phoenix by pinfall	Singles match for the WWE Women's Championship	—
2	Triple H defeated The Undertaker, Jeff Hardy, Big Show, Vladimir Kozlov, and Edge (c)	Elimination Chamber match for the WWE Championship	35:55
3	Randy Orton defeated Shane McMahon by pinfall	No Holds Barred match	18:16
4	Jack Swagger (c) defeated Finlay (with Hornswoggle) by pinfall	Singles match for the ECW Championship	7:53
5	Shawn Michaels defeated John "Bradshaw" Layfield by pinfall	All or Nothing singles match. Since Michaels won, he was released from his employment contract with JBL. Had JBL won, Michaels would have had to be a permanent employee of JBL.	13:17
6	Edge defeated Rey Mysterio, Chris Jericho, John Cena (c), Mike Knox, and Kane (Note: Before the match started, Edge attacked Kofi Kingston and replaced him in the match.)	Elimination Chamber match for the World Heavyweight Championship	29:46
(c) / – the champion(s) heading into the match; D / – this was a dark match

=== Elimination Chamber entrances and eliminations (SmackDown) ===
Eliminated	Wrestler	Entered	Eliminated by	Method	Times
1	Edge (c)	1	Jeff Hardy	Pinfall	03:00
2	Vladimir Kozlov	3	The Undertaker	Pinfall	22:57
3	Big Show	4	Triple H	Pinfall	26:09
4	Jeff Hardy	2	The Undertaker	Pinfall	28:28
5	The Undertaker	6	Triple H	Pinfall	35:55
Winner	Triple H	5			35:55

=== Elimination Chamber entrances and eliminations (Raw) ===
Eliminated	Wrestler	Entered	Eliminated by	Method	Times
1	Kane	3	Rey Mysterio	Pinfall	09:37
2	Mike Knox	4	Chris Jericho	Pinfall	14:42
3	John Cena (c)	6	Edge	Pinfall	22:22
4	Chris Jericho	2	Rey Mysterio	Pinfall	23:54
5	Rey Mysterio	1	Edge	Pinfall	29:46
Winner	Edge	5			29:46
