= No Way Out (2001) =

World Wrestling Federation pay-per-view event

- Promotional poster featuring Kurt Angle
- Promotion: World Wrestling Federation
- Date: February 25, 2001
- City: Paradise, Nevada
- Venue: Thomas & Mack Center
- Attendance: 15,223
- Buy rate: 590,000

Pay-per-view chronology
← Previous; Royal Rumble	Next → WrestleMania X-Seven

No Way Out chronology
← Previous; 2000	Next → 2002

The 2001 No Way Out was a professional wrestling pay-per-view (PPV) event produced by the World Wrestling Federation (WWF, now WWE). It was the third No Way Out and took place on February 25, 2001, at the Thomas & Mack Center in the Las Vegas suburb of Paradise, Nevada. The show is widely considered to be one of the greatest WWE pay-per-views of all time.

Seven professional wrestling matches were scheduled on the event's card, which featured a supercard, a scheduling of more than one main event. The first saw The Rock defeat Kurt Angle in a standard wrestling match to win the WWF Championship, despite interference by Big Show. The other main event was a Two-out-of-three falls match in which Triple H defeated "Stone Cold" Steve Austin two falls to one. The featured bout on the undercard was a Fatal Four Way match for the WWF Intercontinental Championship between defending champion Chris Jericho, Chris Benoit, Eddie Guerrero, and X-Pac, which Jericho won.

== Production ==
=== Background ===
No Way Out was first held by the World Wrestling Federation (WWF, now WWE) as the 20th In Your House pay-per-view (PPV) event in February 1998. Following the discontinuation of the In Your House series after February 1999, No Way Out returned in February 2000 as its own professional wrestling PPV event, thus establishing it as the annual February PPV for the promotion. The third No Way Out event was held on February 25, 2001, at the Thomas & Mack Center in the Las Vegas suburb of Paradise, Nevada.

=== Storylines ===
The main feud heading into the show was between The Rock and Kurt Angle for the WWF Championship. At SummerSlam, The Rock defeated Angle and Triple H in a Triple threat match to retain the WWF Championship. At No Mercy, Angle defeated The Rock to win the title after interference from Rikishi failed. Two months later, at Armageddon, Angle pinned The Rock to retain the WWF title in a Hell in a Cell match, also involving "Stone Cold" Steve Austin, Triple H, Rikishi, and The Undertaker. On the January 1 episode of Raw Is War, The Rock lost a #1 contenders match to Kane by countout after Angle interfered. A few days later on SmackDown!, The Rock lost a non-title match to Angle by disqualification after attacking Angle with a steel chair. On the February 8 episode of SmackDown!, The Rock defeated Big Show to become the #1 contender to the WWF Championship at No Way Out.

Another main feud was between "Stone Cold" Steve Austin and Triple H, which began at SummerSlam 1999 when Triple H, after failing to win the WWF Championship from Austin in a Triple threat match, also involving Mankind, decided to hit Austin with a steel chair, and targeted his leg with it. Austin would get his rematch a couple of months later at No Mercy against Triple H, but lost after The Rock accidentally struck him with a sledgehammer that was meant for Triple H. At Survivor Series, Austin was booked into a triple threat match for the WWF Championship that also included then-WWF Champion Triple H, and The Rock. Instead, however, Austin was run down by a car in the parking lot. Big Show would replace Austin in the match, and would win the WWF Championship. What followed was neck surgery by Dr. Lloyd Youngblood and a nine-month rehabilitation; with the car angle as his reason for leaving. In September 2000 at Unforgiven, Austin made his official return, and tried to find out who ran him down at Survivor Series the previous year. On the October 9, 2000 episode of Raw Is War, Rikishi finally admitted to being the driver because "he did it for The Rock." At the following pay-per-view, No Mercy, Austin made his in-ring return to face Rikishi in a No Holds Barred Match. During the match, Austin attempted to drive his truck into Rikishi, who by that time, was a bloody mess. Before he could, he was stopped by police officers, and WWF officials, and the match was deemed a no-contest. Austin was then arrested and was later bailed by Commissioner Mick Foley. During a handicap match against Rikishi and Kurt Angle, Triple H, who had been showing signs of a face turn, came down with the apparent intention of teaming with Austin. After clearing the ring, Triple H smashed his sledgehammer over Austin's head, and revealed it was actually him behind the whole scheme, and it was he who paid off Rikishi to run Austin over, attempting to keep the WWF Championship from Austin and end his career. At Survivor Series, Triple H had plotted to run Austin down again during their match (thus repeating the events of the previous year's Survivor Series) but his plot failed when Austin lifted Triple H's automobile with a forklift, then let it drop 20 feet. On the January 8th episode of Raw Is War, Austin challenged Kurt Angle for the WWF Championship. The title match ended in a no-contest when Triple H interfered and struck Austin with a steel pipe. At the Royal Rumble, Austin got back at Triple H by interfering and costing him the WWF Championship against Angle. Austin went on to win the Royal Rumble match, last eliminating Kane.

Finally, on the February 5 edition of Raw Is War, Vince McMahon announced a Two-out-of-three falls match between Austin and Triple H at No Way Out to settle their differences. The first fall would be a singles match, the second fall would be a street fight, and the third fall would be a steel cage match. McMahon then instituted a "zero tolerance" policy and said that if either man attacked the other before No Way Out, Austin would lose his WrestleMania match and Triple H would be suspended for six months. After Austin signed his name on paper, Triple H struck him in the back of the head with the clipboard and assaulted him. He then revealed to an irate McMahon that he still had to sign the contract, which he then did. Although the two came close to attacking each other, they did not do so. The week before the event, Austin performed a Stone Cold Stunner on Triple H's wife Stephanie McMahon-Helmsley during Raw Is War, while Triple H performed a Pedigree on Austin's friend and Raw play-by-play commentator Jim Ross on SmackDown! as retaliation.

== Event ==
Other on-screen personnel
Role:	Name:
English commentators	Jim Ross
English commentators	Jerry Lawler
English commentators	Tazz
Spanish commentators	Carlos Cabrera
Spanish commentators	Hugo Savinovich
Interviewers	Kevin Kelly
Interviewers	Lilian Garcia
Ring announcer	Howard Finkel
Referees	Mike Chioda
Referees	Jim Korderas
Referees	Earl Hebner
Referees	Jack Doan
Referees	Tim White
Referees	Theodore Long
Referees	Chad Patton

Before the event began, a dark match took place in which Rikishi defeated Matt Hardy by disqualification.

=== Preliminary matches ===
The event opened with Raven defending the WWF Hardcore Championship against Big Show. Tori, Crash Holly, Steve Blackman, Molly Holly, and Hardcore Holly interfered in the match. Billy Gunn performed a Fameasser on Raven to win the title. Holly, and Blackman attacked Gunn, allowing Raven to pin Gunn to win the title. Big Show executed a Chokeslam on Raven to win the match.

Next, Chris Jericho defended the WWF Intercontinental Championship against Chris Benoit, Eddie Guerrero, and X-Pac. Jericho pinned X-Pac with a Roll-Up to retain the title.

After that, Stephanie McMahon-Helmsley faced Trish Stratus. William Regal interfered in the match, leading to Stratus slapping Regal. Regal performed a Regal Cutter on Stratus, allowing Stephanie to pin Stratus to win the match.

In the fourth match, "Stone Cold" Steve Austin faced Triple H in a Two-out-of three falls match, in which the first fall was a Singles match. Austin targeted Triple H's arm, preventing Triple H from performing the Pedigree. Triple H targeted Austin's leg. Austin performed a Stone Cold Stunner on Triple H to win the first fall. The second fall was a Street Fight. Triple H attempted a Pedigree through an announce table on Austin, but was unable to, allowing Austin to perform a Back Body Drop through an announce table on Triple H. Austin attempted a Stone Cold Stunner on Triple H, but Triple H countered the move, hit Austin with his sledgehammer, and performed a Pedigree on Austin to win the second fall. The final fall was a Steel Cage match. Austin attempted a Stone Cold Stunner on Triple H, but Triple H countered the move into a Pedigree on Austin for a near-fall. Triple H attempted another Pedigree on Austin, but Austin countered the move and performed a Stone Cold Stunner on Triple H for a near-fall. In the end, Triple H hit Austin with a sledgehammer as Austin hit Triple H with a 2X4 wrapped in barbed wire. Triple H fell onto Austin into a pin, meaning Triple H won the match two falls to one. After the match, Austin hit a Stone Cold Stunner on Triple H.

Next, Steven Richards faced Jerry Lawler. The pre-match stipulation was that if Lawler won, The Kat would be able to strip down whenever she wanted and Right to Censor could not interfere. But if Richards won, The Kat would be forced to join Right to Censor. The Kat accidentally hit Lawler with the WWF Women's Championship belt, allowing Richards to pin Lawler to win the match, forcing The Kat to join Right to Censor.

After that, The Dudley Boyz (Bubba Ray Dudley and D-Von Dudley) defended the WWF Tag Team Championship against Edge and Christian and The Brothers of Destruction (The Undertaker and Kane) in a Triple threat tables match. Rikishi and Haku interfered, attacking Undertaker and Kane. Bubba Ray and D-Von performed a 3D through a table on Christian to retain the title.

=== Main event ===
In the main event, Kurt Angle defended the WWF Championship against The Rock. The Rock applied the Sharpshooter on Angle but Angle touched the ring ropes, forcing The Rock to break the hold. The Rock performed a DDT on Angle. While the two were recovering on the mat, Big Show interfered, performing Chokeslams on Angle, The Rock, and the referee. The Rock hit Angle with the title belt for a near-fall. Angle applied the Ankle Lock on The Rock but The Rock touched the ring ropes, forcing Angle to break the hold. The Rock performed a People's Elbow on Angle for a near-fall. Angle threw The Rock into an exposed turnbuckle and performed an Angle Slam on The Rock for a near-fall. The Rock threw Angle into the exposed turnbuckle and performed a Rock Bottom on Angle for a botched near-fall. The Rock performed another Rock Bottom to win the title.

== Aftermath ==
After No Way Out, "Stone Cold" Steve Austin set his focus back to the WWF Championship, and the new champion, The Rock. Austin won the WWF championship at WrestleMania X-Seven from The Rock in a No Disqualification match after Mr. McMahon handed Austin a steel chair to hit The Rock with, turning Austin heel. The following night on Raw is War, Austin, and Triple H truly laid their differences to rest by teaming up and assaulting The Rock following a steel cage rematch The Rock had with Austin.

Triple H felt that after he had defeated "Stone Cold" Steve Austin, there was no one left in the WWF to beat and that he had deserved to be in the main event at WrestleMania. The Undertaker then told Triple H that he'd never beat him and challenged him to a match at WrestleMania, which was made official by WWF Commissioner William Regal after Kane threatened to throw Stephanie McMahon over a balcony. The Undertaker would go on to defeat Triple H at WrestleMania and improve his record at WrestleMania to 9–0. Their feud continued, however, with Austin at Triple H's side as The Two-Man Power Trip and Kane at The Undertaker's side. The two teams would face off at Backlash where Austin and Triple H would come out victorious.

After winning the match at No Way Out, the Dudley Boyz feuded with the Hardy Boyz and Edge and Christian leading to a triple threat TLC match at WrestleMania X-Seven, which Edge and Christian won.

X-Pac would form X-Factor with Albert and a debuting Justin Credible.

Because Jerry Lawler lost his match, the pre-match stipulation was that The Kat was forced to join Right to Censor. However, in real life, The Kat would be fired because of backstage heat and Lawler would quit his job following his then-wife. Paul Heyman would debut and take his place as Jim Ross' announce partner. Heyman would stay on commentary until the end of The Invasion where Lawler returned to the WWF the night after Survivor Series.

== Reception ==
In 2019, Kevin Pantoja of 411Mania gave the event a rating of 9.0 [Amazing], writing, "As I said, the Rumble to Mania era in 2001 is some of the best stuff this company has ever produced. That’s especially true for the PPVs. An outstanding show with only two things that missed the mark. The Hardcore Title match was a mess, and Lawler/Richards did nothing for me. Other than that, you get three matches at ****+, including an all-timer in HHH vs. Austin. The WWF, and IC Title matches were total bangers, while the Tag Title, and Steph/Trish were fun brawls. A little bit of everything."

== Results ==
No.	Results	Stipulations	Times
1^{H}	Rikishi defeated Matt Hardy (with Lita) by disqualification	Singles match	3:50
2	Big Show defeated Raven (c)	Hardcore match for the WWF Hardcore Championship	4:20
3	Chris Jericho (c) defeated Chris Benoit, Eddie Guerrero, and X-Pac	Fatal 4-Way match for the WWF Intercontinental Championship	12:17
4	Stephanie McMahon-Helmsley defeated Trish Stratus	Singles match	8:29
5	Triple H defeated "Stone Cold" Steve Austin by 2–1	Two-out-of-three falls match: Fall 1: Singles match (won by "Stone Cold"); Fall 2: Street Fight (won by Triple H); Fall 3: Steel Cage match (won by Triple H)	39:26
6	Steven Richards (with Ivory) defeated Jerry Lawler (with The Kat)	Singles match Since Richards won, Kat was forced to join Right to Censor; if Lawler had won, Kat would have been allowed to strip naked.	5:32
7	The Dudley Boyz (Bubba Ray Dudley and D-Von Dudley) (c) defeated The Brothers of Destruction (Kane and The Undertaker) and Edge and Christian	Triple threat tag team tables match for the WWF Tag Team Championship	12:04
8	The Rock defeated Kurt Angle (c)	Singles match for the WWF Championship	16:53
(c) / – the champion(s) heading into the match; H / – the match was broadcast prior to the pay-per-view on Sunday Night Heat
