= No Way Out (2002) =

World Wrestling Federation pay-per-view event

- Promotional poster featuring Rob Van Dam
- Promotion: World Wrestling Federation
- Date: February 17, 2002
- City: Milwaukee, Wisconsin
- Venue: Bradley Center
- Attendance: 15,291
- Buy rate: 575,000

Pay-per-view chronology
← Previous; Royal Rumble	Next → WrestleMania X8

No Way Out chronology
← Previous; 2001	Next → 2003

The 2002 No Way Out was a professional wrestling pay-per-view (PPV) event produced by the World Wrestling Federation (WWF, now WWE). It was the fourth No Way Out and took place on February 17, 2002, at the Bradley Center in Milwaukee, Wisconsin. It was the final No Way Out held before the WWF introduced the brand extension in March and the final No Way Out promoted under the WWF name as the promotion was renamed to World Wrestling Entertainment (WWE) in May.

Eight professional wrestling matches were scheduled on the event's card. In the main event, Chris Jericho defeated "Stone Cold" Steve Austin to retain the Undisputed WWF Championship. In other prominent matches, Kurt Angle defeated Triple H to become the number one contender for the Undisputed WWF Championship, and The Rock defeated The Undertaker in a singles match.

This event is notable for the onscreen WWF debut of the New World Order (nWo), a dominant faction in World Championship Wrestling (WCW), which the WWF had acquired in March 2001. This iteration of the nWo consisted of the faction's three original members, Hollywood Hogan, Kevin Nash, and Scott Hall, with this also being their respective returns to the WWF. Coincidentally, No Way Out has the same three-letter abbreviation as the faction, and an altered event logo using the nWo logo font was used for commercials hyping the faction's WWF debut and on the cover of the home video release.

== Production ==
=== Background ===
No Way Out was a professional wrestling pay-per-view (PPV) event first held by the World Wrestling Federation (WWF, now WWE) as the 20th In Your House PPV in February 1998. Following the discontinuation of the In Your House series in February 1999, No Way Out was reinstated in February 2000 as its own PPV event, thus establishing it as the annual February PPV for the promotion. The fourth No Way Out event was held on February 17, 2002, at the Bradley Center in Milwaukee, Wisconsin.

=== Storylines ===
The biggest storyline for No Way Out was when Vince McMahon revealed that he would unleash the New World Order (nWo) upon the World Wrestling Federation in an attempt to "kill (his) creation". Ever since he had become (kayfabe) equal ownership partners with Ric Flair in November 2001 (after Survivor Series), he had gone to great lengths to try to undermine Flair, which led to the angle. McMahon promised that he would not bring the nWo in if Flair agreed to sell his fifty percent stake in the WWF back to McMahon. Flair refused to sell, leading McMahon to reveal several vignettes over the next several weeks with Hollywood Hulk Hogan, Scott Hall, and Kevin Nash, the three original members of the nWo in World Championship Wrestling (WCW), appearing as McMahon's hired guns.

After defeating Kurt Angle on the January 28, 2002 episode of WWF Raw, "Stone Cold" Steve Austin earned a match at No Way Out for the Undisputed WWF Championship against champion Chris Jericho, to whom he had lost in the finals of the tournament to crown the first undisputed champion at Vengeance the previous December. Jericho had just retained the title against The Rock at the Royal Rumble. Afterward, he successfully defended the title again against Maven on the same night where Austin earned a title shot. Jericho and Austin spent the weeks before No Way Out getting back at each other, including a segment where Jericho knocked out Austin and poured beer all over him. On the February 14 episode of WWF SmackDown!, after Jericho got himself disqualified in his non-title match against Kane, Austin retaliated by assaulting Jericho then finished off Jericho with the Stone Cold Stunner then poured beer all over him.

After winning the 2002 Royal Rumble match, Triple H was guaranteed a shot at the Undisputed WWF Championship at WrestleMania X8. Kurt Angle, who Triple H last eliminated, felt that he should have won the Royal Rumble instead so he challenged Triple H to a match at No Way Out with his WrestleMania title shot on the line. Triple H accepted, but was also having trouble with Stephanie McMahon, his on-screen wife, outside the ring. It was due to the face Triple H growing tired of Stephanie's heel characteristics that had led to some hostility between the two. On the February 4, 2002 episode of Raw, Stephanie demanded that they renew their wedding vows on the following week because she was pregnant with their child. On the February 11, 2002 episode of Raw, just before the wedding, Triple H was met with a phone call by his mother-in-law Linda McMahon, who had sent him a video tape revealing that it was a trick, and the doctor that Stephanie had brought in to verify her pregnancy was fake. On the night of the ceremony, Triple H exposed the truth, and declared an end to their on-screen marriage. Three days later, on the February 14, 2002 episode of WWF SmackDown!, after Triple H and WWF Hardcore Champion Maven defeated Angle and The Undertaker by disqualification, Angle and The Undertaker manhandled Triple H while Stephanie announced herself as the guest referee in the match between Triple H and Kurt Angle at No Way Out.

On the January 24, 2002 episode of SmackDown!, The Rock mocked The Undertaker for his quick elimination by Maven during the Royal Rumble match at the Royal Rumble. The Undertaker's interference led to The Rock losing to Kurt Angle in the Semi-finals tournament to challenge for the Undisputed championship at No Way Out. On the February 4, 2002 episode of Raw, during a tag team match, The Undertaker grabbed a steel lead pipe from his motorcycle and nailed The Rock in the head with it, allowing Chris Jericho to score the pinfall win. Three days later on SmackDown!, The Rock retaliated by hitting him with a chair and helping Maven win the WWF Hardcore Championship; however The Undertaker performed a Tombstone Piledriver on The Rock onto the hood of a limousine in revenge. A match was made between the two at No Way Out.

== Event ==
Other on-screen personnel
Role:	Name:
English commentators	Jim Ross
English commentators	Jerry Lawler
Spanish commentators	Carlos Cabrera
Spanish commentators	Hugo Savinovich
Backstage interviewer	Michael Cole
Backstage interviewer	Lilian Garcia
Backstage interviewer	Jonathan Coachman
Ring announcer	Howard Finkel
Referees	Mike Chioda
Referees	Jack Doan
Referees	Brian Hebner
Referees	Earl Hebner
Referees	Jim Korderas
Referees	Theodore Long
Referees	Chad Patton
Referees	Tim White
Referees	Stephanie McMahon (#1 Contender's Match)

Before the event aired live on pay-per-view, a dark match took place in which Diamond Dallas Page defended the WWF European Championship against Big Boss Man, Page defeated Big Boss Man by disqualification.

=== Preliminary matches ===
The event began with the New World Order (nWo) making their way to the ring. Kevin Nash later explained that the nWo wanted to prove that nobody was better than them. Scott Hall spoke briefly before Hollywood Hulk Hogan explained that the nWo did not want to kill the WWF but to be given a chance.

The first match was a Tag Team Turmoil match to determine the #1 contenders to the WWF Tag Team Championship at WrestleMania X8. Scotty 2 Hotty and Albert were the first eliminated by Christian and Lance Storm after Christian pinned Scotty following an Unprettier. Christian and Storm were eliminated by The Hardy Boyz (Matt Hardy and Jeff Hardy) after Jeff pinned Storm following a Swanton Bomb. The Dudley Boyz (Bubba Ray Dudley and D-Von Dudley) were eliminated by The Hardy Boyz after Matt pinned D-Von with a Roll Up. The Hardy Boyz were eliminated by Billy and Chuck after Gunn pinned Matt following a Fameasser. The APA (Faarooq and Bradshaw) eliminated Billy and Chuck after Bradshaw pinned Gunn following a Clothesline from Hell to win the match.

Next, Rob Van Dam faced Goldust. Van Dam executed a Rolling Thunder Senton on Goldust for a near-fall. After Van Dam missed a Five Star Frog Splash, Goldust executed a DDT on Van Dam for a near-fall. Goldust attempted a Curtin Call on Van Dam but Van Dam countered the move and executed a Spinning Heel Kick on Goldust for a near-fall. Goldust attempted a Bulldog on Van Dam but Van Dam countered the move and performed a Step Over Spinning Heel Kick on Goldust. Van Dam pinned Goldust after a Five Star Frog Splash to win the match.

After that, Tazz and Spike Dudley defended the WWF Tag Team Championship against Booker T and Test. Test pinned Tazz but the referee noticed Test using the ropes for leverage, voiding the pinfall. After Test argued with the referee, Tazz forced Test to submit to the Tazzmission to retain the title.

In the fourth match, William Regal defended the WWF Intercontinental Championship against Edge in a Brass Knuckles on a Pole match. Regal retrieved the brass knuckles but Edge knocked Regal off the top rope. Regal knocked the brass knuckles out of the ring to prevent Edge from using them. Edge performed a Spear on Regal and retrieved the brass knuckles whilst Regal pulled another pair out of his tights. Regal hit Edge with them and pinned Edge to retain the title.

=== Main event matches ===
In the fifth match, The Rock faced The Undertaker. The Undertaker executed a Chokeslam on The Rock for a near-fall. The Undertaker threw the referee into the steel steps and retrieved a lead pipe from his motorbike. Ric Flair interfered, attacking The Undertaker but The Undertaker performed a Big Boot on Flair. The Undertaker attempted to hit The Rock with the pipe but The Rock applied the Sharpshooter on The Undertaker. Vince McMahon interfered, distracting the referee. The Rock attacked Vince, which distracted the referee. The Undertaker attempted a Tombstone Piledriver on The Rock but Flair hit The Undertaker with the pipe and The Rock pinned The Undertaker after a Rock Bottom to win the match.

Next, Triple H and Kurt Angle wrestled to determine the #1 contender to the Undisputed WWF Championship at WrestleMania X8 with Stephanie McMahon as special guest referee. Angle attempted a Clothesline on Triple H but Triple H avoided the move, resulting in Angle knocking out Stephanie and Tim White replacing Stephanie as the referee. Angle attacked White and performed a low blow on Triple H whilst Stephanie returned to officiate. Angle applied an Ankle Lock on Triple H but Triple H countered the hold, resulting in Angle knocking Stephanie down again. After Angle missed a chair shot, Triple H performed a Pedigree on Angle and attempted a pin but Stephanie attacked White with a low blow. Triple H attempted a Pedigree on Stephanie but Angle hit Triple H with a chair and pinned Triple H after an Angle Slam to win the match.

In the main event, Chris Jericho defended the Undisputed WWF Championship against "Stone Cold" Steve Austin. Austin fought with Jericho in the entrance way, where Austin threw Jericho into the production trucks. Whilst the referee was distracted, Jericho performed a low blow and two Lionsaults on Austin for a near-fall. Jericho applied the Walls of Jericho on Austin but Austin touched the ropes, forcing Jericho to break the hold. After Jericho retrieved the title belt, the referee was knocked down. Austin performed a Spinebuster on Jericho onto the title belt and attempted a Stone Cold Stunner on Jericho but Jericho countered the move into a Breakdown onto the title belt for a near-fall. After the referee was knocked down again, Austin forced Jericho to submit to the Walls of Jericho. Austin performed a Stone Cold Stunner on Jericho but the nWo interfered, attacking Austin. Hall performed a Stunner on Austin whilst Jericho helped the referee. Jericho pinned Austin to retain the title. After the match, Austin fought with the nWo but Hall performed another Stunner on Austin and Hall spray-painted the initials "NWO" on Austin's back while Nash and Hogan held him down, as the event ended.

== Aftermath ==
After his win over "Stone Cold" Steve Austin, Chris Jericho aligned with Stephanie McMahon (with whom he had been feuding over the past few years), in an attempt to take down Triple H, who had won back his title shot on the episode of Raw immediately following No Way Out. Jericho lost the Undisputed WWF Championship to Triple H at WrestleMania X8, and also failed to win a rematch on the March 25 episode of Raw, in the process forcing Stephanie to, in storyline, leave the WWF per the pre-match stipulation. The feud with Triple H continued, and Jericho would get revenge a month later when he interfered in Triple H's championship defense against Hollywood Hulk Hogan at Backlash and cost him the title. The two would feud in the following weeks until Judgment Day, when Triple H defeated Jericho in a Hell in a Cell match.

The nWo set their sights on "Stone Cold" Steve Austin and The Rock. Austin wrestled and defeated Scott Hall at WrestleMania X8, while The Rock wrestled and defeated Hollywood Hulk Hogan at WrestleMania. Afterwards, Austin would continue to pursue the Undisputed title until he abruptly walked out of the company in June, and The Rock left for three months to make another film. Hogan was kicked out of the nWo after WrestleMania and, as mentioned above, later challenged Triple H for the Undisputed WWF Championship at Backlash and won it, tying him with Austin and The Rock for the record for most WWF Championship wins (which at that time was six and has since been broken twice; John Cena currently holds the record with 14). Hall defeated Bradshaw at Backlash, but was released less than a month later. Kevin Nash injured his biceps shortly after his debut and was relegated to a non-wrestling role within the nWo until July, when he suffered a torn quadriceps tendon in his first match back and missed the remainder of the year.

After losing to The Rock, The Undertaker would feud with Ric Flair, which ended with The Undertaker defeating Flair at WrestleMania X8.

Spike Dudley and Tazz would lose the WWF Tag Team Championship to Billy and Chuck shortly after No Way Out. Billy and Chuck would soon go on to successfully defend them at WrestleMania X8 against The Hardy Boyz, The Dudley Boyz, and The APA in the four teams elimination match.

William Regal would go on to defend the WWF Intercontinental Championship against Rob Van Dam at WrestleMania X8, where Van Dam would get the first of six career reigns as Intercontinental Champion. After losing to Regal at No Way Out, Edge would enter a very short feud with Booker T, which included Edge's first singles win at a WrestleMania event. After losing to Van Dam at No Way Out, Goldust entered the Hardcore division, where he would win the WWF Hardcore Championship nine times.

No Way Out 2002 was the last No Way Out held under the WWF name, as the promotion was renamed to World Wrestling Entertainment (WWE) in May. It was also the last No Way Out held before the promotion introduced the brand extension in March, a storyline subdivision in which the promotion divided its roster into two separate brands, Raw and SmackDown!, where wrestlers were exclusively assigned to perform.

== Results ==
No.	Results	Stipulations	Times
1^{H}	Diamond Dallas Page (c) defeated Big Boss Man by disqualification	Singles match for the WWF European Championship	3:19
2	The APA (Faarooq and Bradshaw) won by last eliminating Billy and Chuck	Tag team turmoil match to determine the #1 contenders to the WWF Tag Team Championship at WrestleMania X8	16:38
3	Rob Van Dam defeated Goldust	Singles match	11:00
4	Tazz and Spike Dudley (c) defeated Booker T and Test by submission	Tag team match for the WWF Tag Team Championship	7:16
5	William Regal (c) defeated Edge	Brass Knuckles on a Pole match for the WWF Intercontinental Championship	10:27
6	The Rock defeated The Undertaker	Singles match	17:25
7	Kurt Angle defeated Triple H	Singles match to determine the #1 contender for the Undisputed WWF Championship at WrestleMania X8 with Stephanie McMahon as special guest referee	14:39
8	Chris Jericho (c) defeated "Stone Cold" Steve Austin	Singles match for the Undisputed WWF Championship	21:33
(c) / – the champion(s) heading into the match; H / – the match was broadcast prior to the pay-per-view on Sunday Night Heat

=== Tag Team Turmoil ===
Draw	Team	Order	Eliminated by
1	Scotty 2 Hotty and Albert	1	Christian and Lance Storm
2	Christian and Lance Storm	2	The Hardy Boyz
3	The Hardy Boyz (Matt and Jeff) (with Lita)	4	Billy and Chuck
4	The Dudley Boyz (Bubba Ray and D-Von) (with Stacy Keibler)	3	The Hardy Boyz
5	Billy and Chuck	5	The APA
6	The APA (Faarooq and Bradshaw)	Winners	

=== Undisputed WWF Championship #1 Contender's Tournament bracket ===
1st Round; SmackDown; January 22, 2002 (Aired: January 24)
"Stone Cold" Steve Austin	Pinfall
Booker T	9:16
Kurt Angle	Pinfall
The Rock	9:21

Final; Raw; January 28, 2002
"Stone Cold" Steve Austin	Pinfall
Kurt Angle	10:27
