= WWE No Way Out =

WWE pay-per-view event series

- WWE No Way Out 2012 logo
- Created by: Vince McMahon
- Promotion: WWE
- Brands: Raw (2003, 2008–2009); SmackDown (2003–2009); ECW (2008–2009)
- Other name: No Way Out of Texas: In Your House
- First event: No Way Out of Texas: In Your House
- Last event: 2012
- Signature match: Elimination Chamber match (2008-2009)

WWE No Way Out was a professional wrestling pay-per-view (PPV) event produced by WWE, a professional wrestling promotion based in Connecticut. It was first held as the 20th In Your House PPV in February 1998 and was titled No Way Out of Texas. It returned as its own PPV in February 2000, with the event's title truncated to "No Way Out," and it continued as the annual February PPV and the last PPV until WrestleMania until 2009. The events in 2008 and 2009 featured the Elimination Chamber match. In turn, No Way Out was replaced by a new annual PPV titled Elimination Chamber in 2010, but one further No Way Out PPV was held as a one-off event in June 2012 to replace Capitol Punishment. In 2013, No Way Out was again discontinued and it was replaced by Payback.

The first four events were held when the promotion was still called the World Wrestling Federation (WWF). In May 2002, the promotion was renamed to World Wrestling Entertainment (WWE). To coincide with the brand extension that was also introduced in 2002, No Way Out was held exclusively for wrestlers of the SmackDown! brand from 2004 to 2007. Following WrestleMania 23 in April 2007, brand-exclusive pay-per-views were discontinued; No Way Out 2007 was the promotion's final PPV to be brand-exclusive during the first brand extension. "WWE" became an orphaned initialism for the promotion in April 2011 in an unofficial term (the legal entity of the company, as shown in the copyrights at the end of each broadcast, is currently "World Wrestling Entertainment, LLC" in 2023) and the brand extension ended that August before No Way Out's one-off return in June 2012.

== History ==
No Way Out was first held as an In Your House pay-per-view (PPV) event. In Your House was a series of monthly PPVs first produced by the World Wrestling Federation (WWF, now WWE) in May 1995. They aired when the promotion was not holding one of its major PPVs and were sold at a lower cost. The first No Way Out event was held as the 20th In Your House PPV on February 15, 1998, and was titled No Way Out of Texas: In Your House as it took place at the Compaq Center in Houston, Texas.

After the In Your House branding was retired following February 1999's St. Valentine's Day Massacre: In Your House, No Way Out branched off as its own PPV in February 2000, with the event's title truncated to "No Way Out" as it was not held in Texas. The event in turn became the promotion's annual February PPV. After Elimination Chamber matches were featured at the 2008 and 2009 events, the promotion ran a survey in September 2009 indicating a possible renaming for No Way Out. Voted by fans via the promotion's website, Elimination Chamber became the name of the February 2010 pay-per-view event, winning against Heavy Metal, Battle Chamber, Chamber of Conflict, and the original No Way Out name. Despite the poll, it was later announced that Elimination Chamber would not be considered as part of the No Way Out chronology and would instead be a new chronology, which in turn became the annual February PPV. The 2010 Elimination Chamber PPV was still promoted in Germany as No Way Out because of concerns that the "elimination chamber" name would bring back imagery of the gas chambers that were used in extermination camps during World War II. No Way Out returned as a one-off PPV in June 2012 (titled No Escape in Germany) and featured a traditional steel cage match; it replaced Capitol Punishment for the June 2012 PPV slot. In 2013, however, No Way Out was again discontinued with the June slot being given to Payback.

In May 2002, the WWF was renamed to World Wrestling Entertainment (WWE) as a result of a lawsuit from the World Wildlife Fund over the "WWF" initialism. Also around this time, the promotion held a draft that split its roster into two distinctive brands of wrestling, Raw and SmackDown!, where wrestlers were exclusively assigned to perform—a third brand, ECW, was added in 2006. No Way Out 2003 had featured wrestlers from both brands, but from 2004 to 2007, No Way Out was held exclusively for wrestlers of the SmackDown! brand. Following WrestleMania 23 in April 2007, WWE discontinued brand-exclusive PPVs. No Way Out 2007 was in turn the promotion's final PPV to be brand-exclusive during the first brand extension, with the events in 2008 and 2009 featuring wrestlers from the Raw, SmackDown, and ECW brands. Before No Way Out's one-off return in June 2012, the promotion ceased using its full name on-air in April 2011 except for the copyright disclaimer at the end of the broadcast, and the first brand extension ended that August.

== Events ==
SmackDown-branded event

#	Event	Date	City	Venue	Main event	Ref.
1	No Way Out of Texas: In Your House	February 15, 1998	Houston, Texas	Compaq Center	Stone Cold Steve Austin, Owen Hart, Cactus Jack, and Chainsaw Charlie vs. Triple H, Savio Vega, and The New Age Outlaws (Road Dogg and Billy Gunn)	
2	No Way Out (2000)	February 27, 2000	Hartford, Connecticut	Hartford Civic Center	Triple H (c) vs. Cactus Jack in a Title vs. Career Hell in a Cell match for the WWF Championship	
3	No Way Out (2001)	February 25, 2001	Las Vegas, Nevada	Thomas & Mack Center	Kurt Angle (c) vs. The Rock for the WWF Championship	
4	No Way Out (2002)	February 17, 2002	Milwaukee, Wisconsin	Bradley Center	Chris Jericho (c) vs. Stone Cold Steve Austin for the Undisputed WWF Championship	
5	No Way Out (2003)	February 23, 2003	Montreal, Quebec, Canada	Bell Centre	The Rock vs. Hulk Hogan	
6	No Way Out (2004)	February 15, 2004	Daly City, California	Cow Palace	Brock Lesnar (c) vs. Eddie Guerrero for the WWE Championship	
7	No Way Out (2005)	February 20, 2005	Pittsburgh, Pennsylvania	Mellon Arena	John "Bradshaw" Layfield (c) vs. Big Show in a Barbed wired Steel Cage match for the WWE Championship	
8	No Way Out (2006)	February 19, 2006	Baltimore, Maryland	1st Mariner Arena	Kurt Angle (c) vs. The Undertaker for the World Heavyweight Championship	
9	No Way Out (2007)	February 18, 2007	Los Angeles, California	Staples Center	John Cena and Shawn Michaels vs. Batista and The Undertaker	
10	No Way Out (2008)	February 17, 2008	Las Vegas, Nevada	Thomas & Mack Center	Triple H vs. Shawn Michaels vs. John "Bradshaw" Layfield vs. Umaga vs. Chris Jericho vs. Jeff Hardy in an Elimination Chamber match for a WWE Championship match at WrestleMania XXIV	
11	No Way Out (2009)	February 15, 2009	Seattle, Washington	KeyArena	John Cena (c) vs. Edge vs. Chris Jericho vs. Rey Mysterio vs. Kane vs. Mike Knox in an Elimination Chamber match for the World Heavyweight Championship	
12	No Way Out (2012)	June 17, 2012	East Rutherford, New Jersey	Izod Center	John Cena vs. Big Show in a Steel Cage match	
(c) – refers to the champion(s) heading into the match

== See also ==
- List of WWE pay-per-view events
