= No Way Out (2012) =

WWE pay-per-view event

- Promotional poster featuring AJ Lee and Daniel Bryan
- Promotion: WWE
- Date: June 17, 2012
- City: East Rutherford, New Jersey
- Venue: Izod Center
- Attendance: 10,000
- Buy rate: 194,000
- Tagline: Yes! Yes! Yes!

Pay-per-view chronology
← Previous; Over the Limit	Next → Money in the Bank

No Way Out chronology
← Previous; 2009	Next → Final

The 2012 No Way Out (known as No Escape in Germany) was a professional wrestling pay-per-view (PPV) event produced by WWE. It was the 12th and final No Way Out and took place on June 17, 2012, at the Izod Center in East Rutherford, New Jersey. This was the first No Way Out held since 2009.

Nine matches were contested at the event, with one match on the pre-show. In the main event, John Cena defeated Big Show in a Steel Cage match. In other prominent matches, Sheamus defeated Dolph Ziggler to retain the World Heavyweight Championship and CM Punk defeated Kane and Daniel Bryan in a triple threat match to retain the WWE Championship. The event received 194,000 pay-per-view buys, up from the prior year's Capitol Punishment event of 170,000, but down on the 2009 No Way Out figure of 272,000 buys.

This edition of No Way Out replaced Capitol Punishment for the June 2012 PPV slot, which made it the only No Way Out held in June as all previous ones were held in February. Following this event, however, No Way Out was again discontinued and replaced by Payback in 2013. This was in turn the only No Way Out held since the original brand extension ended in August 2011, and the only No Way Out held to be promoted under the company's shortened trade name of WWE, as following WrestleMania XXVII in April 2011, the company ceased using its full name of World Wrestling Entertainment, although that remains the legal name of the company.

== Production ==
=== Background ===
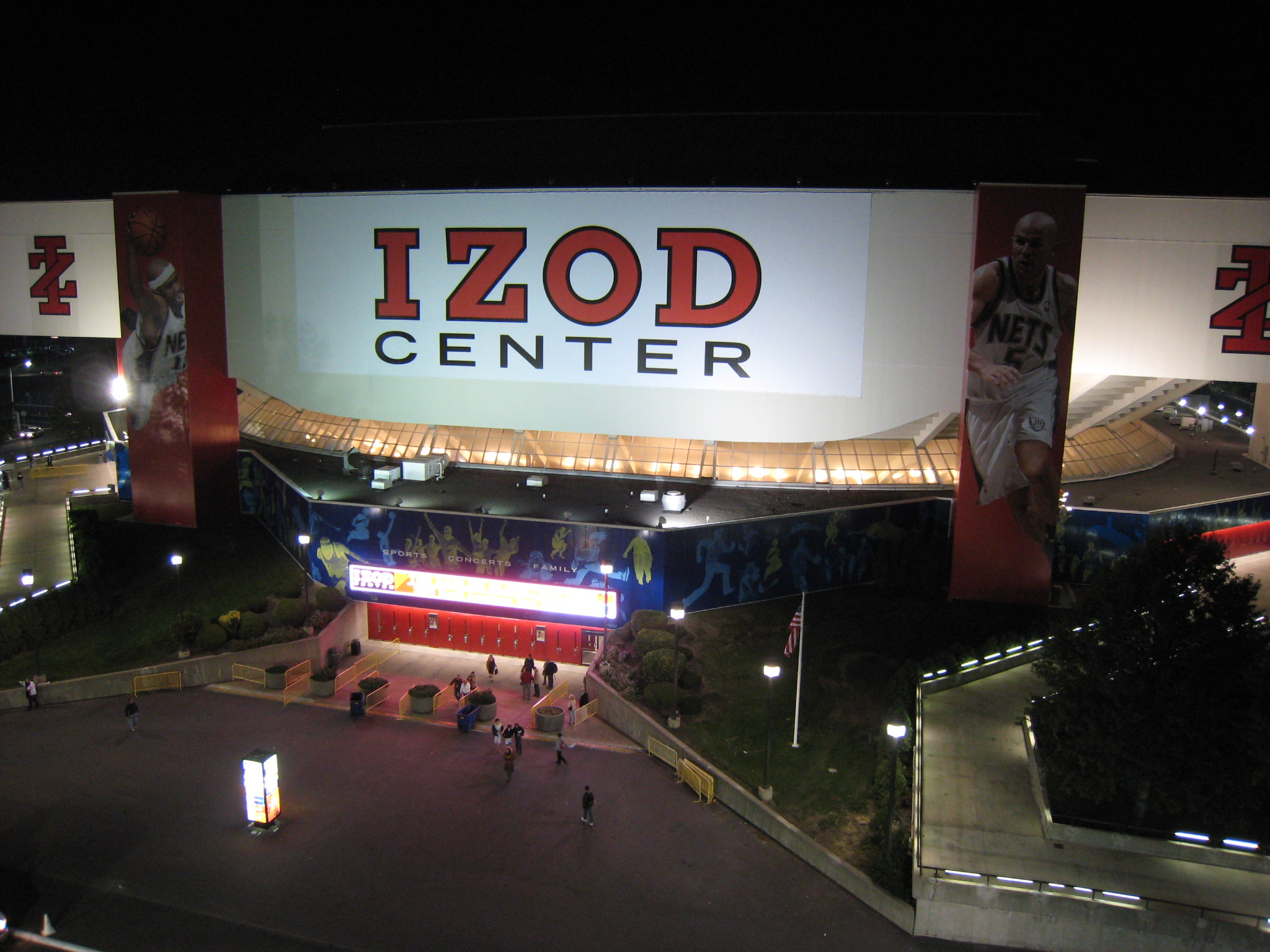
The 12th and final No Way Out was held at the Izod Center in East Rutherford, New Jersey.

No Way Out was a professional wrestling pay-per-view (PPV) event first held by WWE as the 20th In Your House PPV event in February 1998. Following the discontinuation of the In Your House series in February 1999, No Way Out was reinstated in February 2000 as its own PPV event, thus establishing it as the annual February PPV for the promotion until 2009, after which, No Way Out was discontinued and replaced by Elimination Chamber in 2010. After three years, No Way Out was reinstated to replace Capitol Punishment as the June 2012 PPV. The 12th No Way Out was scheduled to be held on June 17, 2012, at the Izod Center in East Rutherford, New Jersey, making it the only to be held in June.

This was the only No Way Out held since the end of the first brand extension in August 2011. It was also the only No Way Out held to be promoted under the company's shortened trade name of WWE, as following WrestleMania XXVII in April 2011, the company ceased using its full name of World Wrestling Entertainment, although that remains the legal name of the company.

In Germany, the event was titled "No Escape" as the "No Way Out" name was used as the substitute title for February's Elimination Chamber event due to concerns that the "Elimination Chamber" name may remind people of the gas chambers used during the Holocaust.

=== Storylines ===
The event comprised nine matches, including one on the pre-show, that resulted from scripted storylines. Results were predetermined by WWE's writers, while storylines were produced on WWE's weekly television shows, Raw and SmackDown.

The main event of the pay-per-view involved John Cena and Big Show. On the May 14 episode of Raw, the general manager of Raw and SmackDown John Laurinaitis fired Big Show for making fun of his voice. At Over the Limit, just before Cena would defeat Laurinaitis, Big Show turned heel and used his WMD (Weapon of Mass Destruction) finisher to incapacitate Cena, allowing Laurinaitis to pin Cena and keep his job as General Manager of Raw and SmackDown. The next night on Raw, Laurinaitis revealed that he gave Big Show back his job, complete with an ironclad contract with a bonus on the condition that he would take out Cena as Big Show was exempt from the "no interference" stipulation for the match. Big Show stated that he only helped Laurinaitis when he didn't receive any sympathy from the other Superstars, and because of his ironclad contract, started attacking every wrestler on WWE's roster in revenge. Laurinaitis would soon book a match between Cena and Big Show inside a steel cage for No Way Out. On the June 11 episode of Raw, Mr. McMahon returned to evaluate Laurinaitis's job, but was interrupted by the Big Show, at which point McMahon announced that if Big Show lost, Laurinaitis would be fired, at which point Big Show knocked out McMahon with the WMD after Cena ducked. On the June 15 episode of SmackDown, Laurinaitis announced the stipulation if Cena lost, he would be fired, at which point Cena knocked Laurinaitis out.

Originally Sheamus was set to defend his World Heavyweight Championship against Alberto Del Rio. Following a successful title defense by Sheamus against Del Rio, Randy Orton and Chris Jericho at Over the Limit, Del Rio, Orton and Kane competed in a triple threat match on the May 25 edition of SmackDown to earn a title match against Sheamus at No Way Out, which Del Rio won. However, Del Rio was pulled from the match following a concussion during the June 8 episode of SmackDown. On the June 11 episode of Raw, Dolph Ziggler defeated Christian, Jack Swagger, and The Great Khali in a fatal-four way elimination match to become the new number one contender for the World Heavyweight Championship.

Another feud involved the WWE Champion CM Punk defending his title in a Triple Threat match against Daniel Bryan and Kane. On the May 18 edition of SmackDown, Punk was put in a match against Kane, where Bryan was in commentary observing the match. Bryan would run interference by attacking Kane with a steel chair and making it look like Punk did it, causing Kane to attack Punk with the chair. On the May 21 edition of Raw, Bryan, who demanded a rematch due to Punk tapping out moments after scoring the pin during their WWE Championship match at Over the Limit, was facing off against Kane, set up by Punk in which the situation nearly reversed itself. Afterwards, Kane would start attacking both indiscriminately after being a pawn in each of their plans. On the June 1 episode of SmackDown, which involved Punk defending the WWE Championship against Kane, Bryan would interfere in the match, attacking both once more, only for Kane to chokeslam both Bryan and Punk. Afterwards, John Laurinaitis came out to announce a triple threat match involving Punk, Bryan and Kane for the WWE Championship at No Way Out.

== Event ==
Other on-screen personnel
Role:	Name:
English Commentators	Michael Cole
English Commentators	Jerry Lawler
English Commentators	Booker T
Spanish Commentators	Carlos Cabrera
Spanish Commentators	Marcelo Rodriguez
Backstage interviewer	Matt Striker
Backstage interviewer	Josh Mathews
Ring announcers	Lilian Garcia
Ring announcers	Justin Roberts
Referees	Mike Chioda
Referees	Charles Robinson
Referees	John Cone
Referees	Scott Armstrong
Referees	Chad Patton

=== Pre-show ===
The pre-show featured Brodus Clay defeating David Otunga by countout.

=== Preliminary matches ===
The event opened with Sheamus defending the World Heavyweight Championship against Dolph Ziggler. In the end, Ziggler applied a Sleeper Hold but Sheamus countered into White Noise on Ziggler. Sheamus executed a Brogue Kick on Ziggler to retain the title.

Next, Santino Marella faced Ricardo Rodriguez in a Tuxedo match. Marella won by stripping Rodriguez down to his underwear.

After that, Christian defended the WWE Intercontinental Championship against Cody Rhodes. The match ended when Rhodes attempted a Beautiful Disaster Kick but Christian avoided and executed a Spear on Rhodes to retain the title.

In the fourth match, The Prime Time Players (Titus O'Neil and Darren Young) faced Primo & Epico, The Usos (Jimmy Uso and Jey Uso), and Tyson Kidd and Justin Gabriel in a Fatal 4-Way Tag team match to determine the #1 contenders to the WWE Tag Team Championship. Young executed a Gut Check on Primo for the victory.

In the next segment, Triple H came out and spoke about Brock Lesnar, who was not present, and the lawsuit, which included Lesnar attacking Triple H. He then stated that they are fighters and he wants a fight with Lesnar. Triple H then formally challenged Lesnar to a match at SummerSlam.

Next, Layla defended the WWE Divas Championship against Beth Phoenix. Layla executed a Neckbreaker on Phoenix for the victory.

After that, Sin Cara faced Hunico. Sin Cara executed a Tilt-A-Whirl Headscissors Takedown on Hunico for the victory.

In the seventh match, CM Punk defended the WWE Championship against Daniel Bryan and Kane. During the match, Bryan applied the Yes Lock on Punk but Punk escaped the hold and executed a GTS on Bryan. Punk pinned Bryan but Kane pulled Bryan out of the ring, voiding the pinfall. Kane attempted a Chokeslam on Punk but Punk countered into a DDT on Kane for a near-fall. Punk executed a Diving Elbow Drop on Kane for a near-fall. Kane executed a Chokeslam on Punk for a near-fall. The match ended when Kane accidentally collided with AJ Lee, allowing Punk to execute the GTS on Kane to retain the title.

In the penultimate match, Ryback faced Dan Delaney and Rob Grimes in a Handicap match. Ryback executed a Shell Shocked on Delaney and Grimes simultaneously for the victory.

=== Main event ===
In the main event, John Cena faced Big Show inside a Steel Cage. The stipulation of the match was that if Big Show won, John Laurinaitis would fire Cena, but if Cena won, Mr. McMahon would fire Laurinaitis. Big Show dominated the match in the early going, stopping Cena from escaping multiple times. Cena nearly escaped through the door, but Laurinaitis pushed Mr. McMahon into the door, which struck Cena. Big Show then executed a Chokeslam on Cena for a near-fall. Big Show then inadvertently attacked the referee with a WMD after Cena ducked. Big Show then executed a second WMD on Cena and attempted to walk out the door, but was stopped by Brodus Clay, wielding a steel chair. Big Show then attempted to climb out over the top, but Santino Marella, Alex Riley, Zack Ryder, and Kofi Kingston who were Big Show’s victims tried to knock Big Show off the top of the cage. Kingston succeeded, temporarily stopping Big Show. Cena tried to escape through the door, but Big Show stopped him. Cena then executed an Attitude Adjustment on Big Show and climbed to the top of the cage, but was stopped by Laurinaitis, wielding his crutches. Clay restrained Laurinaitis, allowing Cena to climb out of the cage for the win before Big Show could drag himself through the door. McMahon then fired Laurinaitis and Cena put Laurinaitis through the Spanish announcers' table with an Attitude Adjustment as the event ended.

== Reception ==
The event received 194,000 buys, up from last year's Capitol Punishment pay-per-view of 170,000.

== Aftermath ==
No Way Out 2012 would be the final No Way Out event held, as in 2013, the event was again discontinued. That year's June slot was given to a new PPV titled Payback.

== Results ==
No.	Results	Stipulations	Times
1^{P}	Brodus Clay (with Cameron and Naomi) defeated David Otunga by countout	Singles match	05:43
2	Sheamus (c) defeated Dolph Ziggler (with Vickie Guerrero) by pinfall	Singles match for the World Heavyweight Championship	15:10
3	Santino Marella defeated Ricardo Rodriguez	Tuxedo match	04:25
4	Christian (c) defeated Cody Rhodes by pinfall	Singles match for the WWE Intercontinental Championship	11:30
5	The Prime Time Players (Darren Young and Titus O'Neil) (with A.W.) defeated Justin Gabriel and Tyson Kidd, Primo and Epico (with Rosa Mendes) and The Usos (Jey Uso and Jimmy Uso) by pinfall	Fatal-four way tag team match to determine #1 contenders to the WWE Tag Team Championship	09:30
6	Layla (c) defeated Beth Phoenix by pinfall	Singles match for the WWE Divas Championship	06:57
7	Sin Cara defeated Hunico (with Camacho) by pinfall	Singles match	05:48
8	CM Punk (c) defeated Daniel Bryan and Kane by pinfall	Triple threat match for the WWE Championship	18:17
9	Ryback defeated Dan Delaney and Rob Grymes by pinfall	Handicap match	01:38
10	John Cena (with Mr. McMahon) defeated Big Show (with John Laurinaitis) by escaping the cage	Steel Cage match Since Cena won, Laurinaitis was fired. Had Big Show won, Cena would have been fired.	19:10
(c) / – the champion(s) heading into the match; P / – the match was broadcast on the pre-show
