= No Way Out of Texas: In Your House =

1998 World Wrestling Federation pay-per-view event

- Promotional poster featuring Kane
- Promotion: World Wrestling Federation
- Date: February 15, 1998
- City: Houston, Texas
- Venue: Compaq Center
- Attendance: 16,110
- Buy rate: 150,000

Pay-per-view chronology
← Previous; Royal Rumble	Next → WrestleMania XIV

In Your House chronology
← Previous; D-Generation X	Next → Unforgiven

No Way Out chronology
← Previous; First	Next → 2000

No Way Out of Texas: In Your House was a 1998 professional wrestling pay-per-view (PPV) event produced by the World Wrestling Federation (WWF, renamed WWE in 2002). It was the 20th In Your House, and inaugural No Way Out, and took place on February 15, 1998, at the Compaq Center in Houston, Texas. The event's name was a reference to it being held in the U.S. state of Texas.

Seven matches were contested at the event. The main event was an eight-man tag team non-sanctioned match in which the team of "Stone Cold" Steve Austin, Owen Hart, Cactus Jack, and Chainsaw Charlie defeated the team of Triple H, Savio Vega, and The New Age Outlaws (Billy Gunn and Road Dogg); Shawn Michaels was originally advertised to take part in the match, but due to a severe back injury that resulted in his first retirement after the following month's WrestleMania XIV, he was replaced by Vega. Additionally, due to a partnership with the National Wrestling Alliance (NWA), the event saw a defense of the NWA North American Heavyweight Championship in which Justin Bradshaw defeated reigning champion Jeff Jarrett by disqualification, but Jarrett retained as titles do not change hands by disqualification unless stipulated.

This was one of the In Your House events which later became the title of an annual PPV, replacing the method at the time of making new names for all events, aside from the "Big Five" (Royal Rumble, WrestleMania, King of the Ring, SummerSlam, and Survivor Series). It was also the last In Your House event to have the In Your House banner around the ring. Unlike a few other former In Your House events, which returned in 1999 after In Your House was discontinued earlier that year, this event would not be reinstated until 2000, and because later events did not take place in Texas, the name was truncated to "No Way Out", which became the annual February PPV until 2009, after which, only one further event was held, which was in June 2012.

== Production ==
=== Background ===
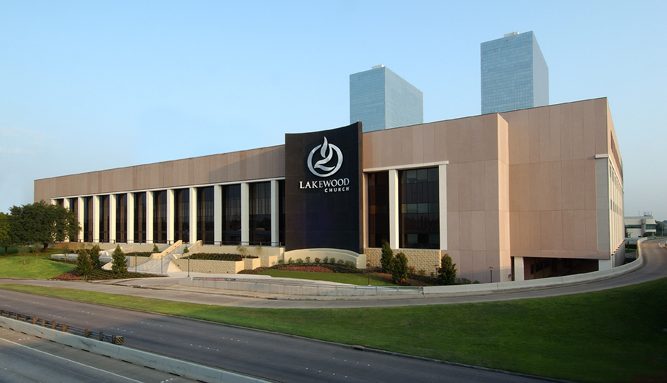
The 20th In Your House was held in Houston, Texas at the Compaq Center (pictured c.2005 after it had since been renamed as Lakewood Church Central Campus).

In Your House was a series of monthly professional wrestling pay-per-view (PPV) events first produced by the World Wrestling Federation (WWF, renamed WWE in 2002) in May 1995. They aired when the promotion was not holding one of its then-five major PPVs (WrestleMania, King of the Ring, SummerSlam, Survivor Series, and Royal Rumble) and were sold at a lower cost. The 20th In Your House, titled No Way Out of Texas: In Your House, was scheduled for February 15, 1998, at the Compaq Center in Houston, Texas. The event's name was a reference to it being held in the U.S. state of Texas.

=== Storylines ===
Due to jealousy over his wife, and valet, Sable, receiving all the attention of the audience, Marc Mero sought to annoy the crowd by sending Sable away from ringside, and instead being accompanied by The Artist Formerly Known as Goldust, who first dressed up as Sable, and then later, in a nod to the popular song "The Beautiful People", as Marilyn Manson. Metalheads, and cross-dressers The Headbangers, took exception to this.

During WWF Shotgun Saturday Night, the number one contender for the WWF Light Heavyweight Championship, Pantera, was getting ready to execute a moonsault on Brian Christopher. However, Christopher managed to get up, and attack Taka Michinoku, before laying him down for the moonsault instead. It turned out to all be a ploy, as the next week, Christopher and Pantera tagged up against Taka, and Aguila. During the match, Christopher tried to use a foreign object against Taka, but it was kicked out of his hands; Pantera quickly picked it up, and put it inside of his mask, making use of it by tagging himself in and performing a diving headbutt to take the pin.

Two Saturdays previous to the event, The Godwinns interrupted The Quebecers' match, causing them to lose by hitting them with a slop bucket; the Quebecers took revenge the following week; attacking Henry on the outside, distracting Phineas in the ring, giving Savio Vega a chance to hit a spinning heel kick, and win the match.

The National Wrestling Alliance's (NWA) presence continued to be felt in the WWF, proposing respect for tradition, whilst letting Jim Cornette's tennis racket assist them in winning matches. In a match against NWA North American Champion Jeff Jarrett, The New Blackjacks found themselves torn apart when Barry Windham mistimed a lariat, and hit teammate Justin "Hawk" Bradshaw when trying to aid him from interference from Cornette, and The Rock 'n' Roll Express. This turned out to be not so accidental as after the match, Windham attacked Bradshaw again and declared his alliance with the NWA. Windham appeared the next week without his facial hair, severing ties with Bradshaw, but after winning a match with Jeff Jarrett against the Legion of Doom, Bradshaw rushed the ring and chased away the NWA contingent. Accepting a challenge from the tag team, Bradshaw revealed his partner to be Flash Funk, who offered little assistance once the Express took him out behind the referee's back, leading Bradshaw to fight an effective handicap match. Despite winning the match, he suffered a post-match beat down after being hit with Cornette's tennis racket and suffered a four-man elevated neck breaker, followed by a figure-four leg lock, with the Express stretching his arms, and Windham – now sporting blond hair, further separating his image with Bradshaw – striking with a running bodysplash.

At the Royal Rumble, Ken Shamrock was awarded the Intercontinental Championship, defeating "The Rock" Rocky Maivia, despite The Rock using a foreign object. However, the decision was reversed immediately after the match when Rocky told the referee it was he who had been hit with the brass knuckles (Rocky had placed the knuckles inside of Shamrock's trunks after hitting him with them), and, subsequently, the match and the title was re-awarded to Rocky Maivia. This caused Shamrock to snap, and deliver a belly-to-belly slam on referee Mike Chioda, before putting him in the ankle lock submission. Later that night, Kama Mustafa was entering the Royal Rumble match as Ahmed Johnson was exiting the arena. The two crossed paths and Mustafa shoved Johnson, reigniting a longstanding feud between Johnson, and the Nation of Domination. The following week on Raw is War, a match between the Nation, and Disciples of Apocalypse went to a double disqualification. In a tag match between Rock & Faarooq versus Shamrock & Chainz, outside brawling between the two gangs distracted the referee, allowing Rock to hit Shamrock with a steel chair to steal the match away from him.

In a Royal Rumble rematch, Vader was booked to take on The Artist Formerly Known as Goldust, when the lights went out, and Kane interrupted, delivering a tombstone piledriver to the 450-pound wrestler. The following week, Vader returned the favor by attacking Kane in the ring, spraying him down with a fire extinguisher to taunt him over his burns, while trying to blind his one good eye. Paul Bearer later revealed his disgust at hearing Vader's catchphrase "It's time, it's time, it's Vader time", and presented a Vader-branded clock, which he handed to Kane as it spontaneously combusted to flames.

The eight-man main event was the result of several interlinking feuds. As winner of the Royal Rumble match, "Stone Cold" Steve Austin earned the right to a WWF Championship match at WrestleMania XIV against champion Shawn Michaels. Following the Montreal Screwjob, Owen Hart disappeared from WWF programming, only to reappear at the end of D-Generation X: In Your House, attacking Michaels. Owen then set his sights on Triple H, demanding a match for his European Championship, which Triple H declined on the grounds of a fractured kneecap injury, which was legitimate. Triple H eventually agreed to the match on the January 26 episode of Raw is War; however, he sent down the Artist Formerly Known as Goldust (who had been dressing up in various disguises each week) in his place with the belt, with Luna Vachon also posing as Chyna. After Hart won the match, WWF Commissioner Sgt. Slaughter declared the disguise to be so convincing that he upheld the decision, and awarded the European title to Owen. After tormenting the New Age Outlaws, the hardcore tag team of Cactus Jackband Chainsaw Charlie opened Raw is War with a match to determine the "king of hardcore wrestling", but after Cactus Jack had elbow dropped Charlie inside a dumpster, the Outlaws appeared; the Outlaws then locked the dumpster shut, and wheeled it off the stage, resulting in Cactus, and Chainsaw being hospitalized. Despite this, the two would reappear later in the night after Austin's match with Road Dogg ended in disqualification due to interference from D-Generation X, who tied Austin up in the ropes, and taunted him until Cactus, and Charlie came to his aid. The week before the event, Austin stole the championship belt from Shawn Michaels and locked up Los Boricuas, who were employed by Chyna to help retrieve it. Following a standoff in the ring between Austin, and DX with the Outlaws, Chainsaw Charlie chainsawed his way from underneath the ring, appearing with Cactus Jack as Owen Hart ran in through the crowd.

== Event ==
Other on-screen personnel
Role:	Name:
English commentators	Jim Ross
English commentators	Jerry Lawler
Spanish commentators	Carlos Cabrera
Spanish commentators	Hugo Savinovich
Interviewer	Michael Cole
Interviewer	Dok Hendrix
Ring announcer	Howard Finkel
Referees	Tim White
Referees	Jim Korderas
Referees	Jack Doan
Referees	Mike Chioda

Jim Ross revealed at the beginning of the pay-per-view that Shawn Michaels would not be taking part in the eight-man tag match main event due to injuries he had sustained during a casket match with The Undertaker the month before. JR also announced that due to the heated nature of the main event, the WWF did not want to accept any responsibility for the bout, opting to make it an unsanctioned match.

After making their way to the ring, Marc Mero announced there was only room for one sexy lady at ringside, and sent Sable to the back, despite the protestations of the audience. Mero's initial dominance was soon overturned by The Headbangers fluid teamwork, which included some abuse of the rules, despite not being the heel team. The tables were turned when Dustin Rhodes threw Thrasher over the top rope, where Luna Vachon opened him up on the steel steps while the referee was distracted. Sable returned during the match, making a beeline for Luna. This distraction allowed the Headbangers to swap places (Mosh having just suffered a TKO from Mero, and Thrasher taking his place), and steal a victory with an inside cradle. After the match, Mero, Goldust, and various officials had to restrain the two fighting women. After Goldust, and Luna left, Sable shoved Mero to the ground and walked away to loud cheers from the audience.

Sunny then made her way to the ring as the guest ring announcer for the Light Heavyweight Championship bout. Before the match could begin, Brian Christopher made his way down to ringside, and was invited to join the commentary team by Jerry Lawler. Challenger Pantera, and champion Taka Michinoku exchanged offense until Pantera was eventually thrown out of the ring; Taka then executed a springboard crossbody from the top rope. The highflying continued with Pantera delivering a diving spinning hurricanrana to Michinoku from the apron to ringside, before applying some submission holds, including a chicken-wing stretch, and a modified STF submission. Taka managed to kick out of a moonsault, and rolled out of a second attempt, building some offensive maneuvers until he eventually nailed Pantera with the Michinoku Driver for the win. After the match, Christopher went to enter the ring to attack Taka. As Jerry Lawler tried to stop Christopher, Taka took them both out with a crossbody to the outside of the ring, before escaping through the crowd.

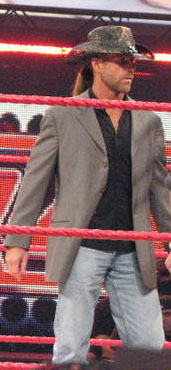
Shawn Michaels did not appear in the main event as advertised, owing to a severe back injury that resulted in his first retirement after the following month's WrestleMania XIV.

The tag team match between The Quebecers, and The Godwinns began with a lot of technical wrestling; a mixture of shoulder barges, arm twists, and armbar takedowns. The Godwinns isolated Jacques, frequently double-teaming him in the corner, which eventually led to their undoing, as the referee reprimanded Henry Godwinn, allowing Pierre to break the deadlock. This amounted to little though, as the illegal man, Henry, hit Pierre with a clothesline, forced into it by Phineas Godwin, from the apron, which led to the pin. Feeling cheated, The Quebecers held their hands up in celebration after that match and were struck from behind with slop buckets for their effort.

Justin "Hawk" Bradshaw then came to the ring in Texan attire, with leather chaps, a cowboy hat, and a bullwhip. After chasing the NWA team around the ring, Howard Finkel informed the crowd that, aside from Cornette, who possesses a manager's license, Jeff Jarrett's accomplices must leave the ringside area. After flailing Jarrett with the chaps, the match was officially underway, and before long, Jarrett soon left the ring, looking for support from Cornette; Bradshaw took a disliking to this, and slid out of the ring, banging the pair's head together. Upon re-entering the ring, Jarrett took advantage, with Cornette aiding him outside the ring. Midway through the match, Jarrett began to focus on Bradshaw's knee, delivering low kicks, and elbow drops to it. The match began to even up when Bradshaw caught Jarrett in a diving crossbody, turning it into a fall-away slam. Following an exchange of fists, Jarrett suffered a powerbomb, and, hoping to stall the pin, Cornette climbed onto the apron. Bradshaw pulled him into the ring, Irish whipping him into Jarrett, after which, the referee tried to remove Cornette from the ring. While the referee was occupied with Cornette, Jarrett hit Bradshaw with Cornette's tennis racket, but the match was stopped by disqualification, as Jarrett was spotted by the official. As Mike Chioda reprimanded Jarrett, Bradshaw stole the racket from him and struck him down, as well as all of the NWA members who ran back to ringside, eventually giving Cornette a power slam. The NWA then began to team up on Bradshaw again until the Legion of Doom ran out and helped Bradshaw chase away the NWA.

The ten-man "War of Attrition" match then began with D'Lo Brown taunting the audience with his fist. As Mark Henry entered the ring, he demanded Ahmed Johnson to be tagged, the latter picking up the 400-pound wrestler, and body-slamming him; Brown responded by delivering the Lo-Down from halfway across the ring, but would later miss a moonsault on Skull. Both teams, particularly the Nation, frequently tagged all their members in, and out until Rocky Maivia, and Ken Shamrock met for the second time, causing all ten men to gather in the ring for a massive brawl. Eventually, the brawl spilled out to ringside, leaving Chainz to deliver a spinebuster to Faarooq in the ring, as the legal man, Shamrock executed a belly-to-belly suplex to Maivia, following up immediately with the ankle lock, causing the Intercontinental champion to tap out. After the match, Maivia, and Faarooq exchanged words, which led to Maivia shoving his leader, and walking out. After calming down the rest of their stablemates, Faarooq demanded that Maivia return to the ring, upon which the Nation saluted the audience with their fists.

Vader attacked Kane before he had time to detonate his pyro, but the brawl quickly turned in Kane's favor, isolating Vader in the turnbuckle before suplexing him. Vader took much punishment for the beginning of the match, succumbing to a DDT before eventually fighting back, punching Kane from the turnbuckle, and turning the match in his favor by kicking Kane in the groin to prevent a chokeslam attempt. Vader then capitalized by slamming his opponent to the mat and executing a huge moonsault, from which Kane almost immediately sat up. The fight then went to the outside, where Vader once again sprayed a fire extinguisher in Kane's face, using this to his advantage to powerbomb Kane. Kane once again sat up, and grabbed Vader by the throat, choke-slamming him, and finishing him off with a tombstone piledriver. After the match, Kane violently struck Vader with a wrench, leading to an EMT team wheeling him out on a gurney.

The majority of wrestlers in the main event came to the ring with some form of weapon, including the last-minute replacement for Shawn Michaels: Savio Vega. Although "Stone Cold" Steve Austin began the match with a Lou Thesz press on Billy Gunn, soon everybody was in the ring attacking each other using various weapons. Austin soon set to work on Triple H, strangling him with a broom handle by the announce table, while Cactus Jack, and Chainsaw Charlie took it in turns to avenge themselves on Road Dogg, before helping Owen Hart power slam Gunn through a table, after which Owen locked Gunn in a sharpshooter. Helmsley then began to brawl with Hart, the two exchanging weapon shots, and ending up on the outside of the ring. Soon after, Road Dogg viciously powerbombed Charlie through two chairs, the shock of which helped the referee shape the match into a traditional tag match, in place of the bedlam style that it had previously been, although the D-Generation X contingent frequently flouted the rules with the referee distracted to isolate Charlie, who took many shots to the head. Cactus Jack managed to break the hold on Charlie, taking the attack to the other team with a series of double-arm DDTs before smashing Billy Gunn through a table, and delivering a double Mandible Claw to both of the Outlaws. A Cactus clothesline, however, allowed his adversaries to take advantage, smashing him with steel steps, with Vega then wrapping Jack's body in barbed wire. Cactus then suffered chair shots from every team member until he finally ducked, causing Gunn to nail Road Dogg. This allowed Cactus to slowly crawl over, and tag in Austin, who came into the ring clotheslining every enemy, knocking the heads of the Outlaws together, and delivering a stunner to Road Dogg, allowing him to quickly win the match for his team, stunning Billy Gunn immediately afterward. After "Stone Cold" celebrated, Chyna confronted him, and prevented Austin from leaving the ring. Austin initially attempted to walk away from Chyna, but after she forced the issue by giving him the finger, Austin gave her the stunner.

== Reception ==
In 2008, J.D. Dunn of 411Mania gave the event a rating of 5.5 [Not So Good], stating, "The wrestling was about par for 1998. There wasn't any angle advancement, and the PPV didn't do anything to set up WrestleMania that wasn't already done on Raw. I can't honestly think of a reason to recommend it, but it's not actively bad. Thumbs down."

== Aftermath ==
Goldust and Marc Mero would continue to tag for some weeks until the hostility between their valets, Luna Vachon, and Sable, respectively, resulted in an in-ring brawl. Mero took exception to Goldust grabbing Sable to restrain her, and struck Goldust, after which a mixed tag team match was booked for WrestleMania, which Sable won after using Mero's TKO on Vachon. Vachon, insistent on humiliating Sable, demanded a rematch between just the two of them at Unforgiven, and laid down the stipulation of an evening gown match.

Ken Shamrock would go on to face Rocky Maivia in a singles match at WrestleMania for the Intercontinental Championship. Shamrock would initially win the match, and the title, making Rock tap out to the ankle lock; but in his fury, Shamrock would not let go of the submission hold, and thus, was disqualified, and the title was returned to Maivia.

Vader's post-match assault allowed him to take some time off for some much-needed surgery, while Kane had to refocus his efforts on the resurrected Undertaker. Vader would make his return at Unforgiven while interfering during the first-ever Inferno Match.

Aside from Savio Vega, the members of the main event faced each other in smaller matches at WrestleMania, with Cactus Jack and Chainsaw Charlie winning the Tag Team championships in the first-ever dumpster match, although the decision would be upheld, and the Outlaws won a rematch, resulting in Charlie's departure from the WWF. Owen Hart lost his European Championship to Triple H, due to an ankle injury, and outside interference from Chyna. Similar interference prevented him from retrieving the gold at WrestleMania. "Stone Cold" Steve Austin would eventually get his hands on Shawn Michaels, who lost his WWF Championship and had to retire from wrestling due to his back injury until SummerSlam 2002.

The "In Your House" branding was retired shortly before April 1999's Backlash event, as the company moved to install permanent names for each of its monthly PPVs. After two years, No Way Out returned in February 2000 as its own PPV event and its title was truncated to "No Way Out" as it was not held in Texas. It then continued as the annual February PPV for nine years, during which the WWF was renamed to World Wrestling Entertainment (WWE) in 2002. No Way Out was replaced by Elimination Chamber in 2010, though one further event was produced in June 2012 as a one-off event. It was again discontinued, and replaced by Payback in 2013.

== Results ==
No.	Results	Stipulations	Times
1	The Headbangers (Mosh and Thrasher) defeated The Artist Formerly Known as Goldust and Marc Mero (with Luna and Sable)	Tag team match	13:53
2	Taka Michinoku (c) defeated Pantera	Singles match for the WWF Light Heavyweight Championship	10:09
3	The Godwinns (Henry O. Godwinn and Phineas I. Godwinn) defeated The Quebecers (Jacques and Pierre)	Tag team match	11:15
4	Justin Bradshaw defeated Jeff Jarrett (c) (with Jim Cornette) by disqualification	Singles match for the NWA North American Heavyweight Championship	8:33
5	Ken Shamrock, Ahmed Johnson, and The Disciples of Apocalypse (Chainz, 8-Ball, and Skull) defeated The Nation of Domination ("The Rock" Rocky Maivia, Faarooq, D'Lo Brown, Kama Mustafa, and Mark Henry) by submission	War of Attrition match	13:44
6	Kane (with Paul Bearer) defeated Vader	Singles match	11:00
7	"Stone Cold" Steve Austin, Owen Hart, Cactus Jack, and Chainsaw Charlie defeated Triple H, Savio Vega, and The New Age Outlaws (Billy Gunn and Road Dogg) (with Chyna)	Eight-man tag team non-sanctioned match	17:37
(c) / – the champion(s) heading into the match
