= Civil twilight (disambiguation) =

Civil twilight is the brightest phase of twilight, the illumination of the lower atmosphere when the Sun itself is not directly visible because it is below the horizon.

Civil twilight may also refer to:

- Civil Twilight (band), a South African four-piece rock band
  - Civil Twilight (album), 2010
- "Civil Twilight", a 2007 song by The Weakerthans from their album Reunion Tour
