= Steven McKellar =

South African musician

- Born: Cape Town, South Africa
- Genres: Alternative rock
- Occupations: Songwriter; musician
- Instruments: Vocals; bass guitar; keyboards; piano
- Years active: 2009–present

Steven McKellar is a South African musician. He is best known as the lead singer and primary songwriter for the band Civil Twilight. He performed "Nobody Can Save Me" with Linkin Park at the memorial concert for Chester Bennington at the Hollywood Bowl. In 2017, McKellar released a solo project, entitled Dayvid.

== Early life ==
McKellar was born in Cape Town, South Africa. Growing up, his father had a substantial record collection and his mother played piano, nurturing his interest in music. Among his early influences were Jeff Buckley, Oasis, and Blur. In 1996, he began playing music with his brother Andrew and childhood friend Richard Wouters, ultimately leading to the creation of Civil Twilight.

== Career ==
McKellar moved to Los Angeles, California in 2005, working various odd jobs before relocating to Nashville, Tennessee in 2008. As a member of Civil Twilight, he has shared the stage with Young the Giant, Florence + the Machine, Smashing Pumpkins, Jimmy Eat World, Silversun Pickups, and Of Monsters and Men.

His music has been featured in many TV spots, including One Tree Hill, House, Star-Crossed, and Terminator: The Sarah Connor Chronicles. "Letters From The Sky" was featured at the end of Episode 11 of Harper's Island.

In 2017, McKellar played with Linkin Park at the Hollywood Bowl in Los Angeles.

McKellar released an EP of his solo work in 2017, entitled Dayvid. In support of the record, he embarked on a five-date South African tour.

== Discography ==
=== Studio albums ===
List of studio albums, with selected chart positions
Title	Album details	Peak chart positions			
Title	Album details	US	US Alt.	US Heat.	US Rock
Civil Twilight	Released: 6 April 2010; Label: Wind-up; Formats: CD, digital download	—	—	16	—
Holy Weather	Released: 26 March 2012; Label: Wind-up; Formats: CD, digital download	124	20	3	31
Story of an Immigrant	Released: 10 July 2015; Label: Wind-up; Formats: CD, digital download	—	—	4	—
"—" denotes a recording that did not chart or was not released in that territory.
