= Story of an Immigrant =

Studio album by Civil Twilight
- Released: July 10, 2015
- Recorded: Atlanta, Georgia
- Genre: Alternative rock; indie rock
- Length: 52:08
- Label: Wind-up
- Producer: Ben H. Allen III

Civil Twilight chronology
Holy Weather (2012)	Story of an Immigrant (2015)

Singles from Story of an Immigrant
- 1. "Story of an Immigrant" Released: 3 March 2015; 2. "Holy Dove" Released: 14 April 2015; 3. "When, When" Released: 2 June 2015

Story of an Immigrant is the third and final studio album by South African alternative rock band Civil Twilight. It was released on 10 June 2015 through Wind-up Records. The album produced three singles: the title track "Story of an Immigrant", "Holy Dove" and "When, When".

== Track listing ==
No.	Title	Length
1.	"Oh Daniel"	4:53
2.	"Holy Dove"	3:40
3.	"When, When"	4:12
4.	"Story of an Immigrant"	4:36
5.	"Let It Go"	3:56
6.	"River Child"	4:18
7.	"All My Clothes"	3:50
8.	"The Other Side"	5:03
9.	"Didn't Know When to Stop"	3:09
10.	"Only for a Time"	5:58
11.	"Love Was All That Mattered"	4:45
12.	"Believe (bonus track)"	3:48
Total length:		52:08

== Personnel ==
- Steven McKellar – lead vocals, bass guitar, piano
- Andrew McKellar – guitar, backing vocals
- Richard Wouters – drums
- Kevin Dailey – guitar
