= WrestleMania 29 =

2013 WWE pay-per-view event

- Promotional poster featuring The Rock and John Cena
- Promotion: WWE
- Date: April 7, 2013
- City: East Rutherford, New Jersey
- Venue: MetLife Stadium
- Attendance: 74,300
- Buy rate: 1,104,000

Pay-per-view chronology
← Previous; Elimination Chamber	Next → Extreme Rules

WrestleMania chronology
← Previous; XXVIII	Next → XXX

WrestleMania 29, also promoted as WrestleMania NY/NJ, was a 2013 professional wrestling pay-per-view (PPV) event produced by WWE. It was the 29th annual WrestleMania and took place on April 7, 2013, at MetLife Stadium in East Rutherford, New Jersey. This was the final WrestleMania to broadcast exclusively via traditional PPV outlets due to the launch of the WWE Network streaming service in February 2014.

Nine professional wrestling matches were contested at the event, with one match contested on the Pre-Show. In the main event, John Cena defeated The Rock to win his record 11th WWE Championship, as well as avenging his loss to The Rock in the main event of WrestleMania XXVIII the previous year. John Cena vs. The Rock was the second time that a WrestleMania main event was held back-to-back (after Bret Hart vs. Yokozuna at WrestleMania IX and X). Other prominent matches included The Undertaker defeating CM Punk, concluding a storyline revolving around Paul Bearer's death and The Undertaker's WrestleMania undefeated streak. In the penultimate match, Triple H defeated Brock Lesnar in a No Holds Barred match; had Triple H lost, he would have retired. Also, Alberto Del Rio retained the World Heavyweight Championship against Jack Swagger in the title's final defense at WrestleMania, as it was unified with the WWE Championship at Tables, Ladders & Chairs in December 2013. Due to that, this was the last WrestleMania to feature two world titles until WrestleMania 33 in 2017.

WrestleMania 29 was a commercial success. It drew 80,676 fans, which became the third highest attended event in the history of WWE after WrestleMania 32 in 2016 and WrestleMania III in 1987. It also became the highest grossing live event in WWE history, grossing US$72 million.

== Production ==
=== Background ===
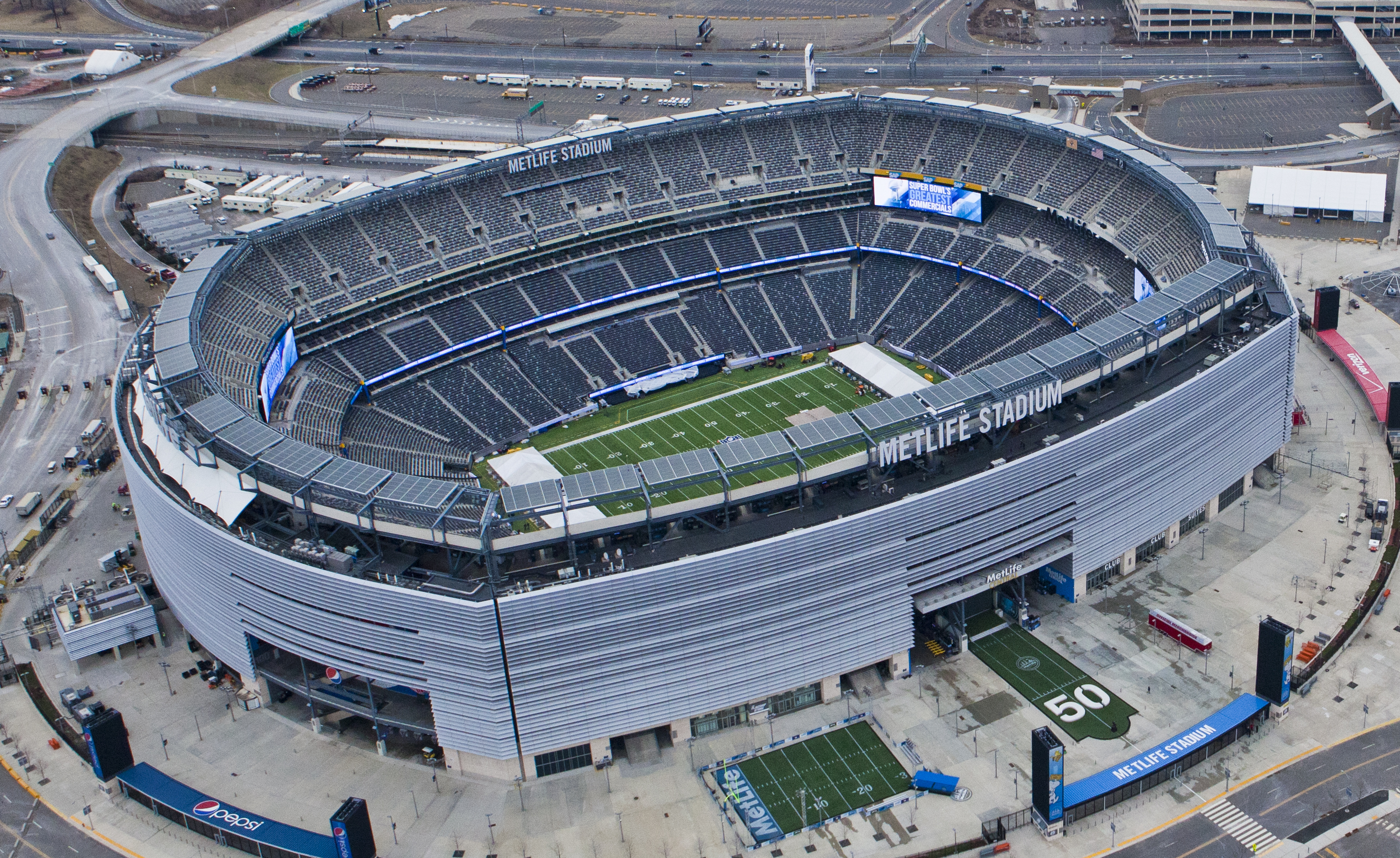
The 29th annual WrestleMania was held at MetLife Stadium in East Rutherford, New Jersey.

WrestleMania is considered WWE's flagship professional wrestling pay-per-view (PPV) event, having first been held in 1985. It is the longest-running professional wrestling event in history and is held annually between mid-March to mid-April. It was the first of WWE's original four pay-per-views, which includes Royal Rumble, SummerSlam, and Survivor Series, referred to as the "Big Four". In the lead up to WrestleMania 29, the event was described as the Super Bowl of sports entertainment. Much like the Super Bowl, cities bid for the right to host the year's edition of WrestleMania.

Announced on February 15, 2012, WrestleMania 29, promoted as WrestleMania NY/NJ, was scheduled to be held on April 7, 2013, at MetLife Stadium in East Rutherford, New Jersey. This was the fifth WrestleMania in the New York metropolitan area; WrestleMania I, X, and XX were held at Madison Square Garden, and a portion of WrestleMania 2 was held at Nassau Coliseum. It was the third WrestleMania held in the state of New Jersey after WrestleMania IV and V, both of which were held at Boardwalk Hall in Atlantic City. The event was the fifth WrestleMania to be held outdoors (after IX, XXIV, XXVI, and XXVIII), but the first to be held outdoors in a cold-weather city. To combat this, WWE added a heater that was hanging above the ring. Additionally, six electric furnaces were plumbed underneath the ring and vented into the ring posts to supply warm air.

Tickets went on sale on November 10, 2012, during which WWE set a first-day sales record of 52,029 tickets, beating the WrestleMania X8 record of 51,620 tickets. Partly due to increased ticket prices, WWE also set a first-day revenue record of more than US$10 million, which topped WrestleMania XXVIII's previous record of $6.3 million. For the first time, WrestleMania was streamed on mobile devices via the WWE app and on Xbox Live.

WrestleMania's set included replicas of several New York City landmarks, including the Brooklyn Bridge and Empire State Building on top of the entrance ramp and the Statue of Liberty on a podium above the ring. There were three official theme songs for the event, "Coming Home" by Diddy – Dirty Money feat. Skylar Grey, "Bones" by Young Guns, and "Letters from the Sky" by Civil Twilight.

Sean "Diddy" Combs performed a medley of tracks during the event, and Living Colour performed "Cult of Personality" as CM Punk made his way to the ring.

=== Storylines ===
The event comprised nine matches, including one on the Pre-Show, that resulted from scripted storylines. Results were predetermined by WWE's writers, while storylines were produced on WWE's weekly television shows, Raw and SmackDown.

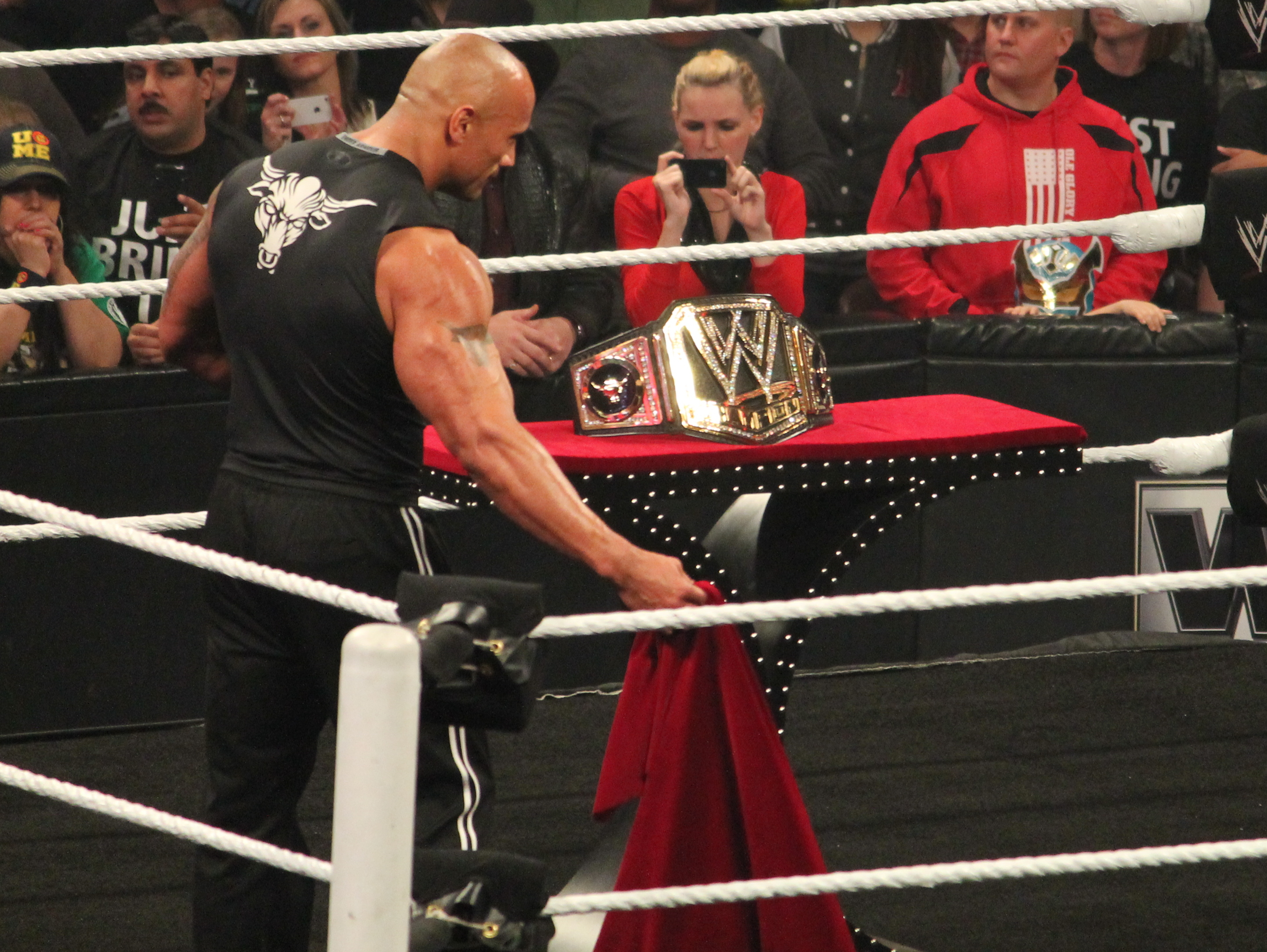
Prior to WrestleMania, The Rock introduced a new design for the WWE Championship

On January 27, John Cena won the 2013 Royal Rumble match, making him the fourth multiple Rumble winner, and earning himself either a WWE Championship or World Heavyweight Championship match at WrestleMania 29. Later that same night, The Rock won the WWE Championship from previous champion CM Punk. The next night on the January 28 episode of Raw, Cena announced he would challenge the reigning WWE Champion, thus challenging The Rock. At the Elimination Chamber event on February 17, Rock successfully defended the championship against Punk. The next night on Raw, Punk challenged Cena for his spot in the main event, and Cena accepted. Cena won the match on February 25, setting up a rematch of his "Once in a Lifetime" match from the previous year against Rock. Cena blamed Rock for sending his life into a downward spiral, citing events such as being attacked by Brock Lesnar on the post-WrestleMania Raw, Big Show turning heel and attacking him, being embarrassed by John Laurinaitis at Over the Limit, failing to cash in his Money in the Bank, losing to CM Punk multiple times and losing to Dolph Ziggler at TLC. He told Rock he would gain redemption by beating him at WrestleMania.

At Elimination Chamber, World Heavyweight Champion Alberto Del Rio successfully retained his championship against Big Show. Jack Swagger, Chris Jericho, and Mark Henry, who all made their return, earned spots in the six-man Elimination Chamber match, along with Daniel Bryan, Kane, and Randy Orton to become the number one contender for the World Heavyweight Championship. Swagger won the match and challenged Del Rio for the title at WrestleMania. Throughout the weeks, Swagger and his new manager, Zeb Colter, repeatedly stressed about the ignorance of America and allowing illegal immigrants in, and promised that they would bring a new era of "Jack Swagger's America". They also repeatedly attacked Del Rio, and Swagger injured Del Rio's ring announcer, Ricardo Rodriguez's ankle.

On the February 25 episode of Raw, Triple H returned, brawling with a returning Brock Lesnar (who was last seen at SummerSlam in 2012), who was about to attack Vince McMahon for the second time, thus reigniting their feud from last year. During the brawl, Lesnar's head was busted open and required 18 stitches. The following week, Triple H set out a challenge to Lesnar at WrestleMania. On the March 11 episode of Raw, after Lesnar attacked Triple H's former D-Generation X members, The New Age Outlaws, Lesnar's manager, Paul Heyman, stated that Lesnar accepted Triple H's challenge, but only if Heyman could add the stipulations, to be revealed after Triple H signed the contract. Triple H signed the contract, therefore, he accepted the conditions, then Heyman revealed that the bout would be No Holds Barred and that if Triple H lost the match, he must retire from WWE. On the final Raw before WrestleMania, Shawn Michaels announced that he would be in Triple H's corner for the match to support him.

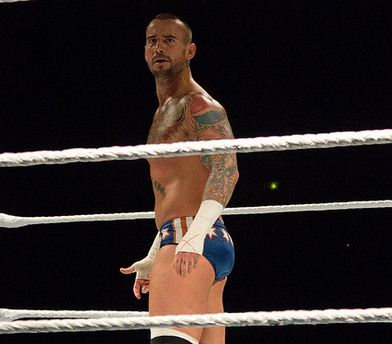
CM Punk faced The Undertaker in Punk's last WrestleMania match until WrestleMania 41 in 2025

On the March 4 episode of Raw, which celebrated "Old School Raw", The Undertaker made his return (his first appearance since WWE Raw 1000) by opening up the show, signaling any challenger to face him and try to end his undefeated WrestleMania streak at the event. CM Punk, Randy Orton, Big Show, and Sheamus all declared they wanted to face The Undertaker, prompting Raw's Managing Supervisor Vickie Guerrero to set a Fatal Four-Way match among the four later that night. CM Punk won the match by pinning Orton, earning him the match against The Undertaker. The following night, The Undertaker and Kane's former manager Paul Bearer died of respiratory problems. The next week on Raw, Punk interrupted Paul Bearer's tribute segment to boast that he would break Undertaker's streak, which prompted Kane to attack Punk, although Punk escaped. Later that night, Kane defeated Punk in a No Disqualification Match, before The Undertaker came to the stage to perform his signature taunt with Kane to honor Bearer. Punk interrupted once again by hitting Kane with The Undertaker's urn, which prompted The Undertaker to chase him away, and Punk escaped with the urn. On the March 18 episode of Raw, The Undertaker came to the ring to tell Punk he had one chance to return Undertaker's property but was interrupted by Punk on the TitanTron, who further boasted about being the one to "snap the streak" while nonchalantly tossing the urn in the air. Disguised as a druid, Punk further assaulted The Undertaker on Raw and constantly beat him with the urn while Punk's manager Paul Heyman looked on, dressed like Bearer. Punk then boldly opened the urn and emptied its ashes over a fallen Undertaker, thus igniting their feud.

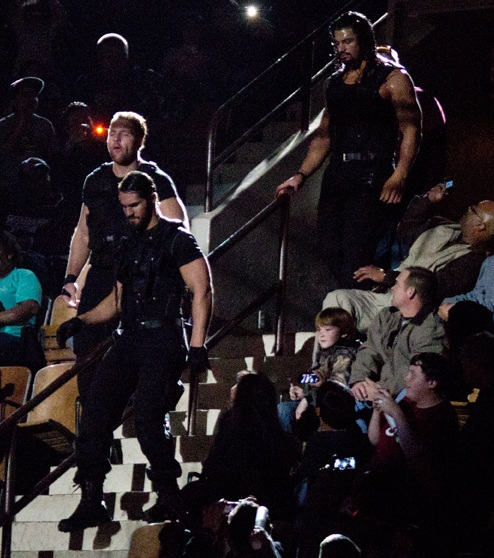
The Shield making their entrance through the crowd at WrestleMania

On the March 15 episode of SmackDown, The Shield (Roman Reigns, Seth Rollins, and Dean Ambrose) challenged Randy Orton and Sheamus to a six-man tag team match at WrestleMania 29. Orton and Sheamus accepted, then recruited Ryback as their partner. Later that night, The Shield interfered in Ryback's match with Mark Henry and delivered a triple powerbomb to Ryback before he was given three World's Strongest Slams by Henry. The following Monday on Raw, Vickie Guerrero pulled Ryback from the six-man tag team match and put him in a singles match with Henry. After winning a match on the March 18 episode of Raw, Sheamus and Orton were about to be assaulted by The Shield, but then Big Show – who had also been brutalized by The Shield – came out to aid Orton and Sheamus, causing The Shield to retreat, and on SmackDown that week, Sheamus, Orton, and Big Show were teamed together by Booker T to test their teamwork in a six-man tag match against 3MB (Heath Slater, Drew McIntyre and Jinder Mahal), in which they were victorious. Following the match, The Shield came to the ring to confront the victors before retreating once again.

On the March 18 episode of Raw, Dolph Ziggler defeated Kofi Kingston, with outside help from his bodyguard Big E Langston. This caused WWE Tag Team Champions Team Hell No (Daniel Bryan and Kane), who both had been attacked by Langston during past matches with Ziggler, to challenge them at WrestleMania. Ziggler's girlfriend, AJ Lee, said they would accept the match only if Team Hell No put their Tag Team Championship on the line, to which they agreed.

A minor rivalry between Chris Jericho and Fandango (the former Johnny Curtis from NXT) developed prior to Wrestlemania. Fandango made numerous appearances, but he never competed in matches due to announcers and wrestlers repeatedly mispronouncing his name or did not say it with the right kind of "feel" he liked. The feud with Jericho began on the March 22 episode of SmackDown when Jericho made fun of Fandango's name. This caused Fandango to interfere with Jericho's match and attack him following the match. Fandango attacked Jericho once more on the March 25 episode of Raw after Jericho's match. This caused Jericho to ask Vickie Guerrero to set up a match between himself and Fandango at WrestleMania. According to Jericho, the original plan was Jericho vs. Ryback, but Vince McMahon changed his rival.

The other rivalry that had escalated was between The Miz and Intercontinental Champion Wade Barrett. Miz and Barrett had been trading jabs back and forth about which of them was the better actor, as Miz had starred in The Marine 3: Homefront, and Barrett had a minor role in the film Dead Man Down. After defending his title in a triple threat match against Miz and Chris Jericho on the March 18 episode of Raw, Barrett continued the feud with Miz after he shoved him on Main Event on March 20, which caused Miz to retaliate. On the March 25 episode of Raw, Miz defeated Barrett in a non-title match via submission, thus earning him a championship match against Barrett. The match took place on the WrestleMania 29 Pre-Show.

==== Canceled match ====
The Bella Twins and Team Rhodes Scholars (Cody Rhodes and Damien Sandow) were scheduled to participate in an eight-person tag team match against Tons of Funk (Brodus Clay and Tensai) and The Funkadactyls (Naomi and Cameron) at WrestleMania, but the match was canceled due to time constraints and instead took place the following night on Raw, where Tons of Funk and The Funkadactyls emerged victorious.

== Event ==
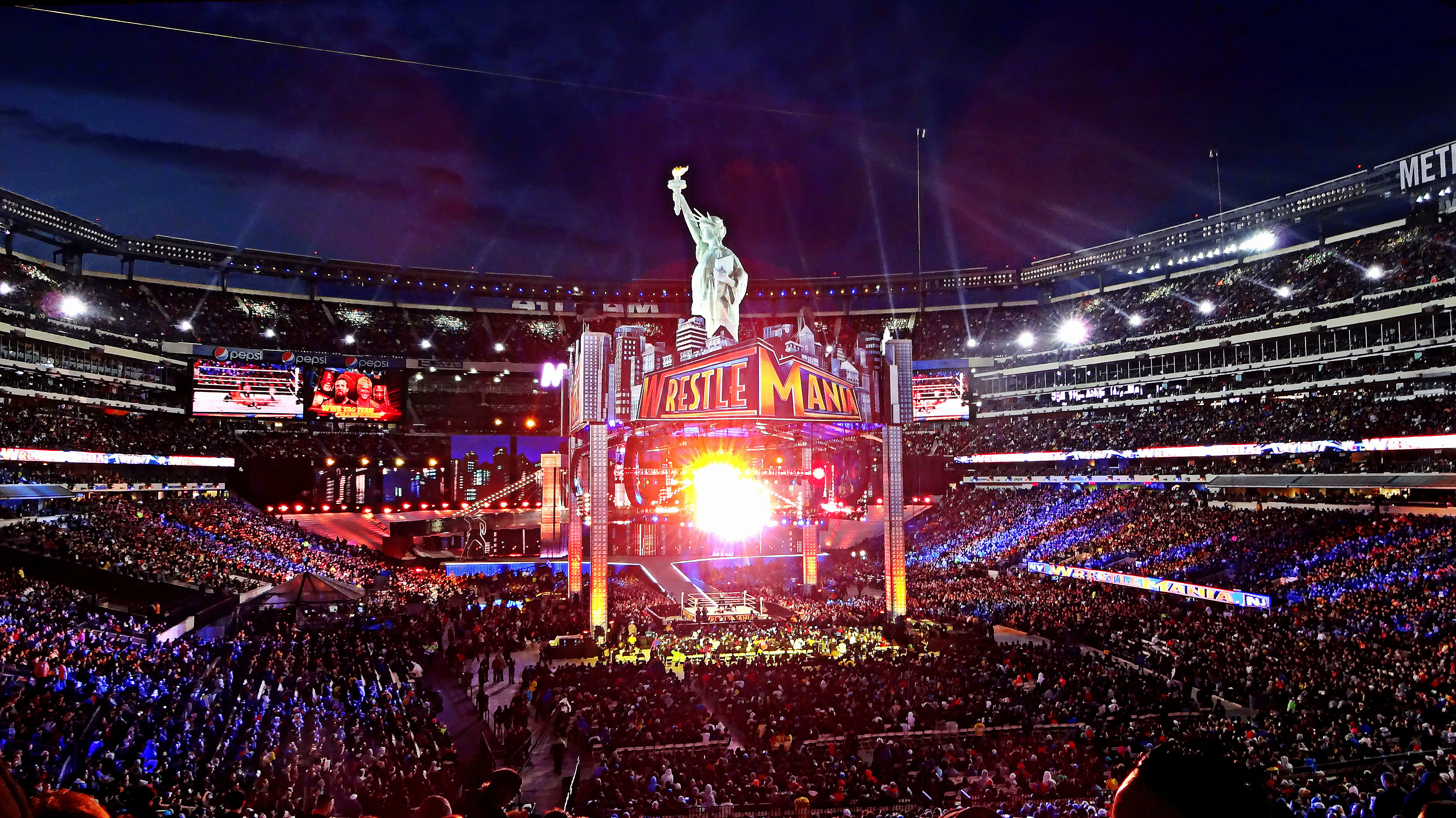
80,676 fans packed MetLife Stadium for WrestleMania

Other on-screen personnel
Role	Name
English Commentators	Michael Cole (Raw)
English Commentators	Jerry Lawler (Raw)
English Commentators	John "Bradshaw" Layfield (Raw)
English Commentators	Josh Mathews (SmackDown)
English Commentators	Matt Striker (Wrestlemania Pre-show)
Spanish Commentators	Carlos Cabrera
Spanish Commentators	Marcelo Rodríguez
Interviewers	Renee Young (WrestleMania Pre-show)
Interviewers	Tony Dawson (WrestleMania Pre-show)
Ring announcers	Lilian Garcia (SmackDown)
Ring announcers	Justin Roberts (Raw)
Ring announcers	Howard Finkel (WWE Hall of Fame)
Ring announcers	Tony Chimel (WrestleMania Pre-show)
Referees	Charles Robinson
Referees	Mike Chioda
Referees	John Cone
Referees	Scott Armstrong
Referees	Marc Harris
Referees	Chad Patton
Referees	Ryan Tran
Referees	Rod Zapata
Pre-show Panel	Scott Stanford
Pre-show Panel	Jim Ross
Pre-show Panel	Kofi Kingston
Pre-show Panel	Dusty Rhodes

=== Pre-show ===
During the WrestleMania XXIX Pre-Show, a panel consisting of Jim Ross, Kofi Kingston, Dusty Rhodes and Scott Stanford discussed the event's matches. Later in the pre-show, Snooki spoke backstage to The Miz and Wade Barrett. Their Intercontinental Championship match, commentated by Matt Striker and Josh Mathews, went back and forth between both wrestlers. The Miz went for the Skull Crushing Finale, but Barrett moved and went for the Bull Hammer. The Miz moved and knocked Barrett to the ground and locked in the Figure-Four Leglock, shades of Ric Flair, and Barrett submitted, giving The Miz his second Intercontinental championship in his career.

=== Preliminary matches ===
The actual pay-per-view opened with The Shield (Roman Reigns, Seth Rollins, and Dean Ambrose) facing Sheamus, Big Show, and Randy Orton in a six-man tag team match. Sheamus and Roman Reigns started the match. Big Show ripped off Ambrose's vest and chopped his chest. Sheamus also removed Seth Rollins's vest. When The Shield went for their trademark Triple Powerbomb on Sheamus, Big Show speared all of them at the same time. When Sheamus tried to tag Big Show, Orton tagged himself in, frustrating Big Show. Rollins came off the top rope but Orton performed an RKO on Rollins. Reigns performed a spear on Orton and Ambrose pinned him. After the match, Big Show knocked out both Sheamus and Orton.

Next, Mark Henry faced Ryback. Henry knocked Ryback out of the ring a few times. Ryback knocked Henry down with a Meat Hook Clothesline, then tried to perform a Shell Shock on Henry, who grabbed the ropes. Henry crashed down on Ryback, driving his face into the mat and knocking him out, then pinned him. Afterward, Ryback gave Henry a spinebuster and a Shell Shock.

After that, Team Hell No (Daniel Bryan and Kane) defended the WWE Tag Team Championship against Dolph Ziggler and Big E Langston. Ziggler mocked Bryan by kissing his on-screen girlfriend, AJ Lee, as Bryan did before his loss at WrestleMania XXVIII. Bryan flew out of the ring onto Ziggler, while Kane and Big E fought inside. Later, as Big E distracted Kane, Ziggler executed the Zig-Zag on Kane for a nearfall. While AJ distracted the referee, Big E threw Ziggler his Money In The Bank briefcase. Ziggler tried to strike Kane with it, but he ducked and Kane performed a chokeslam. In the end, Kane tagged in Bryan and Bryan executed a top-rope headbutt for the pin on Ziggler to retain the titles.

In the fourth match, Fandango, in his in-ring debut, faced Chris Jericho, who began by punishing Fandango. Jericho delivered a Codebreaker early in the match. Fandango executed a roundhouse kick, then a diving leg drop on Jericho for a near-fall. When he went for another, Jericho moved, then went for a Lionsault, but Fandango got his knees up. As Jericho attempted for the Walls of Jericho, Fandango quickly rolled him up for the pin.

Next, Alberto Del Rio defended the World Heavyweight Championship against Jack Swagger (accompanied by Zeb Colter). Del Rio Irish whipped Swagger into the barricade. Swagger later executed the Swagger Bomb, but Del Rio kicked out. Swagger then executed his gut-wrench powerbomb but Del Rio kicked out again. Swagger worked Del Rio's leg, then tried the Patriot Lock a few times, but Del Rio didn't submit. In the end, Del Rio locked in the Cross Armbreaker and Swagger submitted, and Del Rio retained the title.

=== Main event matches ===
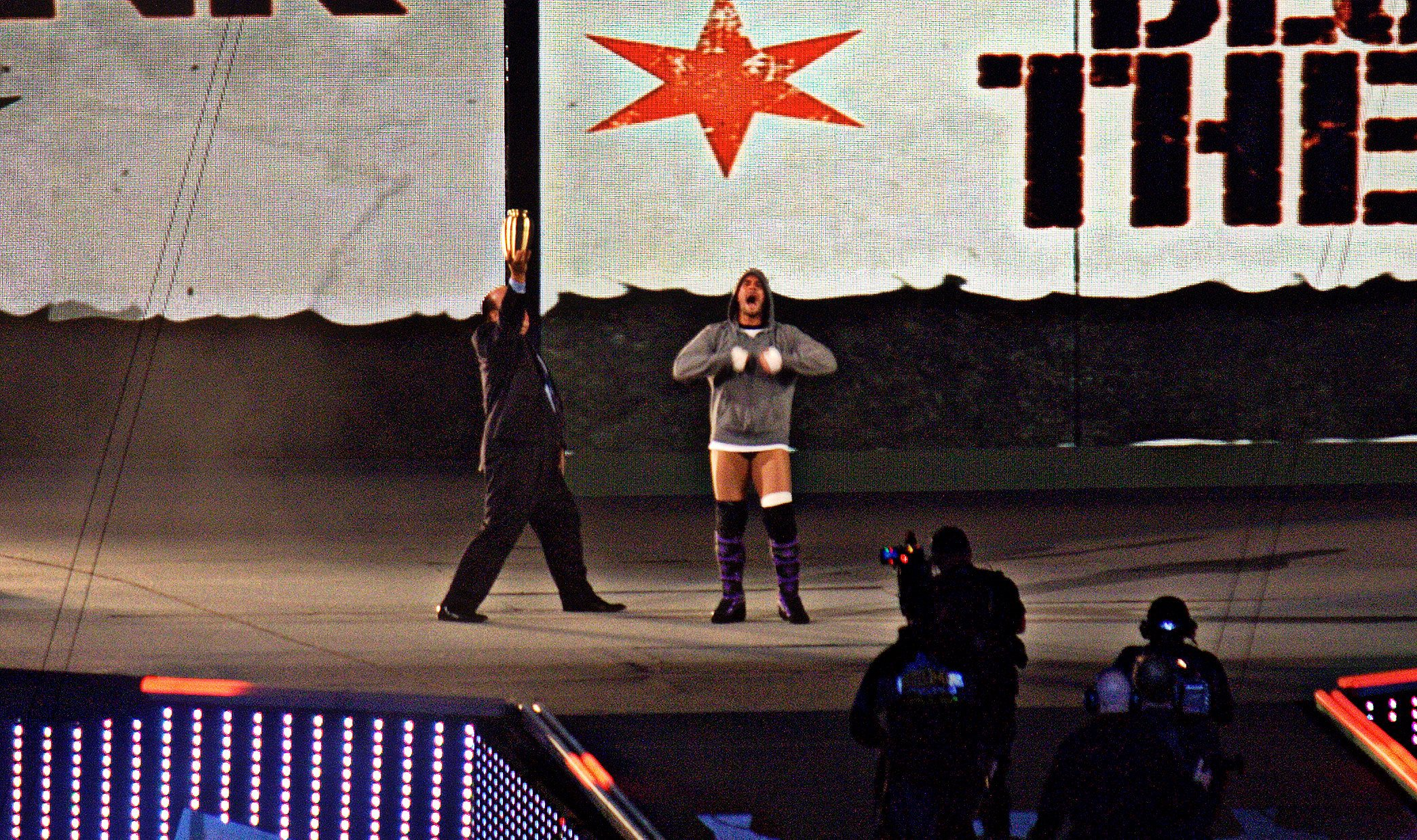
CM Punk making his entrance with Paul Heyman

In the first match of the triple main event, The Undertaker defended his 20–0 WrestleMania winning streak against CM Punk (accompanied by Paul Heyman). Punk first tried to intimidate The Undertaker, finally slapping him. The Undertaker retaliated with a chokeslam attempt, but Punk countered it with a roundhouse kick to the back of the head. The Undertaker delivered a big boot to Punk and threw him outside, where they brawled. The Undertaker cleared the Spanish broadcasting table and executed a guillotine leg drop on the ring apron on Punk. Back in the ring, The Undertaker attempted his signature move, Old School, but was pulled off the rope. Punk then stole the move and used it against The Undertaker. The Undertaker attempted a big boot to the corner but was caught on the top rope when Punk moved. Punk executed a flying double axe handle and then attempted to steal Old School again, but was thrown from the ring. The Undertaker then ran the ropes in an attempt to perform his signature over-the-top-rope suicide dive but Heyman stepped onto the apron in his way. The Undertaker then attempted to chokeslam Heyman but Punk saved Heyman by connecting with a springboard clothesline on The Undertaker for a near-fall. Punk then performed a running high knee in the corner and short-arm clothesline followed by a diving elbow drop on The Undertaker for another count of two. He then attempted a Go To Sleep, but The Undertaker countered with a chokeslam, for a two-count, then Snake Eyes. Punk retaliated with a heel kick and threw The Undertaker to the outside. The Undertaker tried to Last Ride Punk through the table he'd cleared, but Punk countered and kicked him the back of the head. He laid The Undertaker on the table, climbed the turnbuckle, and executed another diving elbow drop onto the broadcasting table. The referee began counting The Undertaker out as Punk made it back into the ring, but The Undertaker made it back into the ring with one second to spare. As Punk attempted to pick him up from the mat, The Undertaker suddenly attempted the Hell's Gate. Punk countered into a bridging pin for another near-fall. He then secured the Anaconda Vice, but The Undertaker powered through to his feet and tried another chokeslam, which Punk reversed into the Go To Sleep but The Undertaker immediately rebounded off the ropes and nailed Punk with the Tombstone for a dramatic near-fall. Back on their feet, the two traded blows, and the referee was knocked down in the chaos. Punk hit the high knee again, but The Undertaker took advantage of the position by attempting Last Ride. While Punk was on The Undertaker's shoulders, Heyman handed him the urn, which he struck on the back of The Undertaker's head. Punk then mocked The Undertaker's traditional pinning style for another two-count. Punk and The Undertaker proceeded to trade near-finishers, with The Undertaker's Tombstone finally winning out, securing his victory and improving his streak to 21 wins. He reclaimed the urn and walked backstage, pausing on the ramp to raise his fist.

In the second main event match, Triple H (accompanied by Shawn Michaels) faced Brock Lesnar (accompanied by Paul Heyman) in a No Holds Barred match with Triple H's career at stake. Prior to the match, Triple H suffered second-degree freeze burns due to a pyrotechnic malfunction, causing dry ice to be sprayed on to his chest and torso during his entrance. Triple H and Lesnar quickly spilled to the floor of MetLife Stadium, pummeling each other with anything and everything within arm's reach. Triple H sent Lesnar crashing into the ringside barricade and then Lesnar drove Triple H's sternum into the broadcasting table in return. After a big brawl, both in and outside of the ring, which included Shawn Michaels getting an F5 from Lesnar and Heyman receiving Sweet Chin Music, Triple H stole Lesnar's submission move, the Kimura lock, and locked it on Lesnar for an extended amount of time. In the end, Triple H performed a Pedigree on Lesnar onto the steel steps and got him down for the three-count securing his career and keeping his in-ring skills intact.

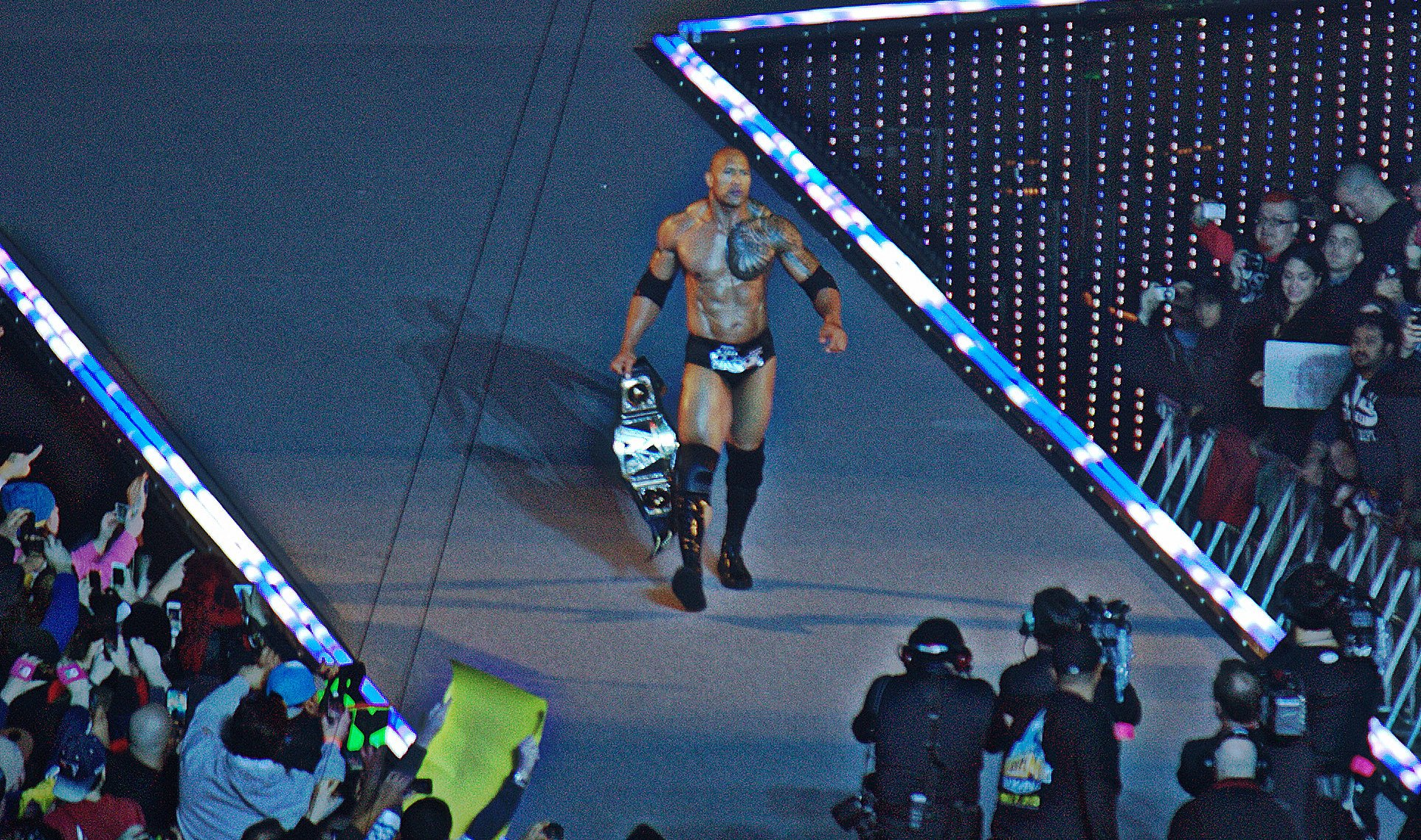
The Rock as WWE Champion at WrestleMania 29

In the main event, The Rock defended the WWE Championship against John Cena. After the bell rang, Cena struck first before The Rock seized control of the match and halted Cena's momentum by sending him scrambling outside the ring to regroup within the bout's opening moments. The match went on while The Rock had control by striking Cena with blows and punches. Cena then locked The Rock into a Crossface, but The Rock countered into a pin for a 2-count. Cena then locked The Rock in an STF, but The Rock powered out. The Rock then executed a Rock Bottom on Cena but only for a 2-count. Cena then performed an AA on The Rock, but only got a 2-count. The Rock soon delivered a People's Elbow on Cena for another 2-count. Cena soon went for a second AA, but The Rock countered into a second Rock Bottom for a 2-count yet again. A frustrated Rock nearly fell into the same trap Cena did the year before when he taunted Cena with Cena's own "You Can't See Me" taunt before going for a second People's Elbow, however, Cena caught The Rock and delivered a second AA for another near-fall. The Rock soon went for a third Rock Bottom, but Cena countered and executed a Rock Bottom instead for a near fall. Cena then tried to sucker The Rock into a third AA by faking a People's Elbow attempt, the same mistake that cost Cena the match the last year. However, when Cena went for the third AA, The Rock countered into a third Rock Bottom for another 2-count. Afterward, both John Cena and The Rock went for an AA and a Rock Bottom respectively. This continued until The Rock delivered a DDT on Cena. But instead of pinning Cena, The Rock instead went for a fourth Rock Bottom and Cena countered with a third AA to win the match and the title. After the match, The Rock and Cena shook hands and hugged each other and The Rock praised Cena as the new WWE Champion, and raised his hand on the top of the stage.

== Reception ==
WrestleMania 29 received generally positive reactions. Matt Kodner of The A.V. Club gave the show a letter grade of B. He generally criticized the event as "too much of the same, with nary a sense of fun to the matches". He claimed the main event between John Cena and The Rock was "all too similar, and the match never popped". He named The Undertaker vs. CM Punk "match of the night". "Though it came nearly an hour before the night was over, their match was the clear climax, and the only true triumph of WrestleMania XXIX [sic]" he said. Kodner claimed P. Diddy gave a "spectacularly phoned-in performance", claiming, "I'll take last year's funky army of dancing mommas as led by Brodus Clay over Diddy any day of the week". He praised the announcers for doing a "fine job" but said John "Bradshaw" Layfield stole the show during the advertisement for Power Slammers action figures. He also praised Fandango's understated entrance but criticized the technical problems on the live stream that caused many watching through WWE.com to miss the opening match.

Canadian Online Explorer's professional wrestling section gave the entire event a rating of 8 out of 10. The six-man tag team match received a 7 out of 10, the World Heavyweight Championship match received a 5 out of 10 and the CM Punk-Undertaker match received a perfect score of 10 out of 10. The Triple H-Brock Lesnar match received a 7 out of 10, the same rating as the main event.

WrestleMania XXIX garnered 1,048,000 PPV buys, 205,000 fewer than the previous year's event. The event set a new record for the highest grossing live event in WWE history, grossing $72 million.

WrestleMania 29 set a new claimed world record of 80,676 fans at MetLife Stadium and was the then second-highest attended wrestling event in history after WrestleMania III.

== Aftermath ==
The Rock suffered legitimate torn muscles and tendons around his pelvis from the match. He later returned at WrestleMania XXX, albeit in a non-wrestling appearance. This would end-up being The Rock’s last match until WrestleMania 32 as well as WrestleMania 40.

On the Raw after WrestleMania, Cena put his championship on the line against anyone. Mark Henry answered the challenge, which turned into a number-one-contender match. Cena won by count-out, and was then assaulted by Henry. Ryback then came to seemingly save Cena – making Henry retreat and helping Cena to his feet – but then attacked Cena. Prior to the April 22 episode, Cena was scheduled to defend the WWE Championship against Ryback. On the May 6 episode, the match was made a Last Man Standing match. The match ended in a no-contest after Ryback rammed Cena through the entrance stage. The night after, Ryback came out with an ambulance and challenged Cena at Payback in an ambulance match. Cena accepted and made the match a three stages of hell match, in which Cena won.

Wade Barrett invoked his rematch clause on Raw and defeated The Miz, reclaiming the Intercontinental Championship for his third reign. In reality, this was done so The Miz could take time off to film the movie Christmas Bounty. Barrett was set to put the title on the line at Payback in a triple threat match against The Miz and Fandango. Fandango was injured and replaced by Paul Heyman's newest client, Curtis Axel. Axel won the championship.

Alberto Del Rio and Jack Swagger had one more match to end their feud, but it turned into a 2-on-1 handicap match with Del Rio facing Swagger and Zeb Colter. Del Rio won but had his leg injured by Swagger. Dolph Ziggler took this opportunity to cash in his Money in the Bank contract, and – despite Del Rio putting up a fight – pinned Del Rio to become the new World Heavyweight Champion. Ziggler was soon concussed and put out of action. He still held the title, and Del Rio and Swagger feuded over the number one contendership. At Extreme Rules, Del Rio won an "I Quit" match for the number one contendership. Del Rio defeated Ziggler at Payback to win the World Heavyweight Championship for a second time, ending Ziggler's reign at 69 days. During the match a double turn occurred, Del Rio turned heel attacking Ziggler's head taking advantage of his concussion, and Ziggler turned face showing a "never-say-die" attitude.

Brock Lesnar returned to Raw on April 15, to challenge Triple H (who had suffered second degree burns to his torso and arms during his WrestleMania ring entrance when the stage sprayed dry ice on him) to a steel cage match at Extreme Rules. A week later, Triple H came out to the surprise of Paul Heyman to accept the challenge and gave Heyman a Pedigree. Lesnar won the rematch at Extreme Rules. Paul Heyman came out the next night to reveal his newest client Curtis Axel. Triple H interrupted and issued a challenge to Axel before slapping him. Later that night, Triple H suffered a concussion during the match. The match ended as a no contest, but the victory went to Axel. Triple H returned on the June 3 episode of Raw, attempting to fight Axel, but was forbidden by his wife Stephanie McMahon, and his father-in-law Vince McMahon. He returned to the ring on June 10 edition of Raw to fight Axel. During the match, Vince took the ring bell and stopped the match after Triple H tried to restart it.

On the April 15 episode of Raw, CM Punk came out to talk about his match with The Undertaker and his historic WWE championship reign. Punk gave Heyman the microphone, hugged him and walked out of the arena. He returned by defeating Chris Jericho at Payback. Punk then dropped Heyman as his manager, causing Heyman to turn on Punk and Punk becoming a face again.

The Undertaker came out the next night on Raw to pay tribute to Paul Bearer, but was interrupted by The Shield, who tried to attack him, until Team Hell No made the save. The next week, Undertaker wrestled his last match on Raw teaming up with Team Hell No in a losing effort against The Shield by pinfall from Dean Ambrose on Daniel Bryan. The same week, Undertaker wrestled his last match on SmackDown in a winning effort against Ambrose of The Shield by submission with Hell's Gate. Afterwards, Undertaker made some defense against The Shield, but Roman Reigns speared him through the barricade in the timekeeper's area and with his teammates triple-powerbombed him through the broadcasting table. After SmackDown went off the air, Undertaker was saved by D-Generation X (Triple H, Billy Gunn and Road Dogg). CM Punk would become the final victim of Undertaker's undefeated WrestleMania streak as at WrestleMania XXX would lose at the hands of Brock Lesnar, ending the streak at 21-1.

Chris Jericho continued his feud with Fandango, with each man attacking the other after matches. Jericho defeated Fandango in a rematch at Extreme Rules.

WrestleMania 29 was the final WrestleMania to broadcast exclusively via traditional PPV outlets due to the launch of the WWE Network streaming service in February 2014, after which, WWE's PPVs were simulcast on the Network and included as part of the service's $9.99 monthly subscription instead of a separate PPV purchase (in the 2020s, the WWE Network began to merge under other streaming platforms, but maintaining this model for PPV events). This was also the last WrestleMania to feature the original World Heavyweight Championship, as the title was unified with the WWE Championship at December's TLC: Tables, Ladders & Chairs event, with the latter being renamed to WWE World Heavyweight Championship. It would in turn be the final WrestleMania to feature two world championships until WrestleMania 33 in 2017.

== Results ==
No.	Results	Stipulations	Times
1^{P}	The Miz defeated Wade Barrett (c) by submission	Singles match for the WWE Intercontinental Championship	4:08
2	The Shield (Dean Ambrose, Roman Reigns, and Seth Rollins) defeated Big Show, Randy Orton, and Sheamus by pinfall	Six-man tag team match	10:33
3	Mark Henry defeated Ryback by pinfall	Singles match	8:02
4	Team Hell No (Daniel Bryan and Kane) (c) defeated Big E Langston and Dolph Ziggler (with AJ Lee) by pinfall	Tag team match for the WWE Tag Team Championship	6:17
5	Fandango defeated Chris Jericho by pinfall	Singles match	9:11
6	Alberto Del Rio (c) (with Ricardo Rodriguez) defeated Jack Swagger (with Zeb Colter) by submission	Singles match for the World Heavyweight Championship	10:30
7	The Undertaker defeated CM Punk (with Paul Heyman) by pinfall	Singles match	22:08
8	Triple H (with Shawn Michaels) defeated Brock Lesnar (with Paul Heyman) by pinfall	No Holds Barred match Had Triple H lost, he would have been forced to retire from in-ring competition.	23:58
9	John Cena defeated The Rock (c) by pinfall	Singles match for the WWE Championship	23:58
(c) / – the champion(s) heading into the match; P / – the match was broadcast on the pre-show
