= The Streak (professional wrestling) =

The Undertaker's WrestleMania undefeated streak

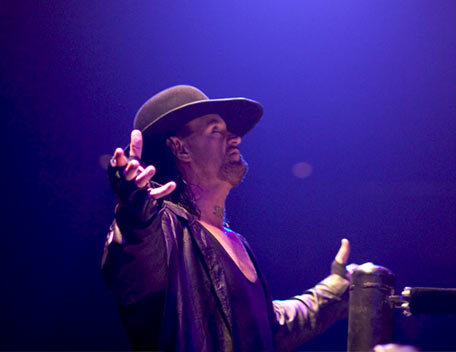
The Undertaker making his entrance in 2008

The Streak (Note: Along with WWE, multiple news outlets have dubbed this run of victories as "the Streak".) was a series of 21 consecutive victories for professional wrestler The Undertaker (Mark Calaway) at WWE's annual flagship marquee event, WrestleMania. It began at WrestleMania VII in 1991 when he beat Jimmy Snuka, with the final win coming against CM Punk at WrestleMania 29 in 2013; The Undertaker was absent from WrestleMania X in 1994 and WrestleMania 2000, owing to injury. Overall, he defeated 18 men during the Streak, which included three bouts with Triple H and two each opposite Kane and Shawn Michaels, as well as a handicap match against A-Train and Big Show at WrestleMania XIX.

The Streak became the cornerstone of WrestleMania, with a potential win over The Undertaker at the event being described as a greater honor than winning the WWE Championship. For years, debate had revolved around who, if anybody, should break the Streak, with prominent wrestlers giving comment. At WrestleMania XXX in 2014, The Undertaker lost by pinfall to Brock Lesnar, thus ending the Streak.

== Background ==
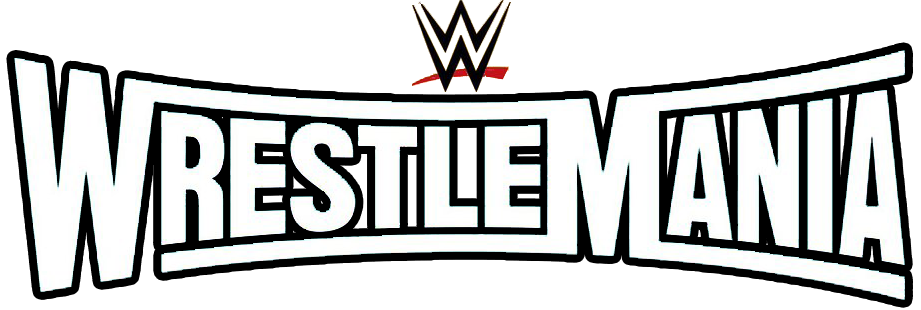
The current official WrestleMania logo

=== WrestleMania ===
WrestleMania is the premier annual event of the largest professional wrestling promotion in the United States, WWE. Formed as a counter to Jim Crockett Promotions' successful Starrcade event, WrestleMania I was broadcast to one million nationwide via closed-circuit television and pay-per-view. WrestleMania's widespread success helped transform professional wrestling and made WWE the most successful wrestling promotion in the world, prompting WWE to promote the event as the "Super Bowl of sports entertainment".

=== The Undertaker ===
Born Mark William Calaway on March 24, 1965, in Houston, The Undertaker is a former American professional wrestler. He is currently retired from the WWE, where he had worked since 1990, making him the company's longest-tenured in-ring performer. Holding the streak for most wins at WrestleMania, Calaway began his wrestling career with World Class Championship Wrestling (WCCW) in 1987. After wrestling for World Championship Wrestling (WCW) as "Mean" Mark Callous from 1989 to 1990, he signed with the World Wrestling Federation (WWF, later WWE) in 1990. In WWE, The Undertaker is a seven-time world champion, having won the WWF/E Championship four times and the World Heavyweight Championship three times, as well as the winner of the 2007 Royal Rumble. He is recognized as the fourth youngest WWF/E Champion in history, having won the championship aged 26 years, 8 months, and 3 days.

== Match statistics ==
WrestleMania record breakdown		
27 matches	25 wins	2 losses
By pinfall	20	2
By submission	2	0
By disqualification	1	0
By casket	1	0
By burial	1	0

WrestleMania win–loss record of The Undertaker
Result	Rec.	Opponent	Date	Match time and method of victory	Venue	Note
Win	1–0	Jimmy Snuka	March 24, 1991; WrestleMania VII	4:20; Pinfall	Los Angeles Memorial Sports Arena; Los Angeles, California	
Win	2–0	Jake Roberts	April 5, 1992; WrestleMania VIII	6:36; Pinfall	Hoosier Dome; Indianapolis, Indiana	
Win	3–0	Giant González	April 4, 1993; WrestleMania IX	7:33; Disqualification	Caesars Palace; Las Vegas, Nevada	
Win	4–0	King Kong Bundy	April 2, 1995; WrestleMania XI	6:36; Pinfall	Hartford Civic Center; Hartford, Connecticut	
Win	5–0	Diesel	March 31, 1996; WrestleMania XII	16:46; Pinfall	Arrowhead Pond; Anaheim, California	
Win	6–0	Sycho Sid	March 23, 1997; WrestleMania 13	21:19; Pinfall	Rosemont Horizon; Rosemont, Illinois	Won the WWF Championship.
Win	7–0	Kane	March 29, 1998; WrestleMania XIV	17:05; Pinfall	Fleet Center; Boston, Massachusetts	
Win	8–0	Big Boss Man	March 28, 1999; WrestleMania XV	9:48; Pinfall	First Union Center; Philadelphia, Pennsylvania	This was a Hell in a Cell match.
Win	9–0	Triple H	April 1, 2001; WrestleMania X-Seven	18:19; Pinfall	Reliant Astrodome; Houston, Texas	
Win	10–0	Ric Flair	March 17, 2002; WrestleMania X8	18:47; Pinfall	SkyDome; Toronto, Ontario, Canada	This was a no disqualification match.
Win	11–0	A-Train and Big Show	March 30, 2003; WrestleMania XIX	9:45; Pinfall	Safeco Field; Seattle, Washington	This was a 2-on-1 handicap match.
Win	12–0	Kane	March 14, 2004; WrestleMania XX	7:45; Pinfall	Madison Square Garden; New York City, New York	
Win	13–0	Randy Orton	April 3, 2005; WrestleMania 21	14:14; Pinfall	Staples Center; Los Angeles, California	
Win	14–0	Mark Henry	April 2, 2006; WrestleMania 22	9:26; Casket	Allstate Arena; Rosemont, Illinois	This was a casket match.
Win	15–0	Batista	April 1, 2007; WrestleMania 23	15:47; Pinfall	Ford Field; Detroit, Michigan	Won the World Heavyweight Championship.
Win	16–0	Edge	March 30, 2008; WrestleMania XXIV	23:50; Submission	Citrus Bowl; Orlando, Florida	Won the World Heavyweight Championship.
Win	17–0	Shawn Michaels	April 5, 2009; WrestleMania XXV	30:41; Pinfall	Reliant Stadium; Houston, Texas	
Win	18–0	Shawn Michaels	March 28, 2010; WrestleMania XXVI	23:59; Pinfall	University of Phoenix Stadium; Glendale, Arizona	This was a Streak vs. Career match contested under No Holds Barred rules.
Win	19–0	Triple H	April 3, 2011; WrestleMania XXVII	29:22; Submission	Georgia Dome; Atlanta, Georgia	This was a No Holds Barred match.
Win	20–0	Triple H	April 1, 2012; WrestleMania XXVIII	30:50; Pinfall	Sun Life Stadium; Miami Gardens, Florida	This was a Hell in a Cell match with Shawn Michaels serving as the special guest referee.
Win	21–0	CM Punk	April 7, 2013; WrestleMania 29	22:07; Pinfall	MetLife Stadium; East Rutherford, New Jersey	
Loss	21–1	Brock Lesnar	April 6, 2014; WrestleMania XXX	25:12; Pinfall	Mercedes-Benz Superdome; New Orleans, Louisiana	End of The Undertaker's WrestleMania win Streak.
Win	22–1	Bray Wyatt	March 29, 2015; WrestleMania 31	15:12; Pinfall	Levi's Stadium; Santa Clara, California	
Win	23–1	Shane McMahon	April 3, 2016; WrestleMania 32	30:05; Pinfall	AT&T Stadium; Arlington, Texas	This was a Hell in a Cell match.
Loss	23–2	Roman Reigns	April 2, 2017; WrestleMania 33	23:00; Pinfall	Camping World Stadium; Orlando, Florida	This was a No Holds Barred match.
Win	24–2	John Cena	April 8, 2018; WrestleMania 34	2:46; Pinfall	Mercedes-Benz Superdome; New Orleans, Louisiana	
Win	25–2	AJ Styles	March 25–26, 2020; WrestleMania 36	19:18; Burial	WWE Performance Center; Orlando, Florida	This was a Boneyard Match. The match was taped between March 25 and 26, and aired on April 4.

== The Streak ==
=== The beginning of the Streak (4–0) ===
I looked forward to that, brother, when Vince Jr. told me to wrestle The Undertaker. Brother, I loved it. I loved it. I said, "Why not?". Here's a kid that's blowing up. He looks the part. He looked good. It was a pleasure for me to go in there and work with him.

— Jimmy Snuka in 2013

Early into The Undertaker's career, he would defeat various jobbers and other established stars in squash matches, leading to a match with Jimmy "Superfly" Snuka. The match at WrestleMania VII ended when Snuka's attempted springboard maneuver was countered as The Undertaker caught him, and he then hit the Tombstone Piledriver before pinning Snuka. The match has been described retrospectively as "incredibly important" for a match seen at the time as a throwaway match.

In mid-1991, The Undertaker aligned himself with Jake "The Snake" Roberts in his feud with Ultimate Warrior. However, during an episode of Saturday Night's Main Event in February 1992, The Undertaker turned face and defended Randy Savage's manager and wife, Miss Elizabeth, from Roberts's attack. Two weeks later during a "Funeral Parlor" segment, when berated by Roberts regarding whose side he was on, The Undertaker responded, "Not yours". The feud culminated in a match at WrestleMania VIII, where, after delivering his finishing move, the DDT, for the second time, Roberts went to the outside to attack The Undertaker's manager Paul Bearer. The Undertaker then recovered and delivered a Tombstone Piledriver to Roberts on the floor, before rolling him inside the ring and pinning him. Wrestler Bret Hart was critical of the finish, in particular Roberts' role, describing him as "sneaky" for receiving The Undertaker's finishing move outside the ring, preventing a clean victory for the younger wrestler. Calaway credits Roberts for providing him with advice and insight in his early career, while Roberts said he knew from the very beginning Calaway would become a superstar as The Undertaker.

In late 1992 and into early 1993, The Undertaker had been feuding with Harvey Wippleman and engaged in matches with the various wrestlers managed by Wippleman. During the 1993 Royal Rumble, Wippleman introduced Giant Gonzáles. Gonzáles then illegally entered the Royal Rumble match and eliminated The Undertaker. This set up a match between the two at WrestleMania IX, in which Giant Gonzáles was disqualified when he covered The Undertaker's face with a cloth covered in chloroform. This was the only disqualification victory in The Undertaker's streak, as all other wins were obtained by pinfall, submission, or casket. Calaway has described it as the most physically and mentally straining match he ever wrestled, and is rated as amongst the worst matches in his career. Originally, the WWF planned to have Nailz feud with The Undertaker and would have featured an "electric chair match" with Nailz losing and being “electrocuted”. This storyline would be scrapped after Nailz was fired for attacking Vince McMahon over a financial dispute.

Throughout 1994, The Undertaker was sidelined through a legitimate injury and missed WrestleMania X as a consequence. In the months that followed, Ted DiBiase, leader of The Million Dollar Corporation, introduced his own Undertaker, prompting a long-running feud between The Undertaker and the Corporation. King Kong Bundy would represent the Million Dollar Corporation when he faced The Undertaker at WrestleMania XI in 1995. The match, refereed by baseball umpire Larry Young, finished when The Undertaker first bodyslammed and then delivered a flying clothesline to King Kong Bundy before pinning him. The Undertaker never losing at WrestleMania was acknowledged for the first time on commentary during Undertaker's entrance in this match.

=== Major feuds (8–0) ===
At the 1996 Royal Rumble, The Undertaker faced Bret Hart for the WWF Championship, but Diesel cost him the match due to interference. As revenge, The Undertaker cost Diesel his WWF Championship match at In Your House: Rage in the Cage the following month. The two settled their feud at WrestleMania XII, which would be Diesel's final match at the annual event before leaving the company and moving to WCW a couple of months later. Diesel lost via pinfall after The Undertaker delivered the Tombstone Piledriver.

In February 1997, Shawn Michaels vacated the WWF Championship 3 days before the In Your House 13: Final Four event, leaving the championship to be decided at the event in a four corners elimination match between The Undertaker, Bret Hart, Vader and "Stone Cold" Steve Austin. Hart won the match and the championship, but lost it to Sycho Sid in a match the following night on Raw. While Hart and Austin continued their feud, The Undertaker challenged Sid for the WWF Championship at WrestleMania 13. Hart interfered in the match at WrestleMania 13 by hitting Sid with a steel chair. The Undertaker followed up the chair shot by Hart with a Tombstone Piledriver to Sid before pinning him to claim the WWF Championship for the second time, his first reign, in five years, only to later drop the title at SummerSlam 1997, to Bret Hart by an accidental chair shot by special guest referee Shawn Michaels.

Getting to work with The Undertaker right off the bat was a tremendous opportunity. It was an opportunity to be a career-maker, and fortunately I was able to take advantage of that.

— Kane in 2010

Undertaker, after losing the WWF Championship, went after Shawn Michaels, in a small feud leading up to the first-ever Hell in a Cell match between the two at Badd Blood: In Your House, and during the match, Kane was introduced by Paul Bearer to cost The Undertaker the match and the following match at the 1998 Royal Rumble in a casket match thanks to Kane. Kane, before he locked The Undertaker in the casket and set it on fire, leaving people to presume The Undertaker had met his demise, constantly challenged him to many fights, yet The Undertaker refused to fight his flesh and blood. However, The Undertaker would return a month later and challenged Kane to a match at WrestleMania XIV. After Kane had kicked out of two Tombstone Piledrivers (the first man ever to do so), The Undertaker delivered a third to pick up the win over his (storyline) brother. But the rivalry leading up to WrestleMania XIV, only would later, start the ongoing war that would last only two decades from now.

Late-1998 saw the creation of The Undertaker's Ministry of Darkness, and in turn, reignited his pursuit for the WWF Championship. Along the way, he opted to switch targets, and aimed to take control of the entire World Wrestling Federation. In feuding with The Corporation, The Undertaker faced the stable's enforcer, Big Boss Man at WrestleMania XV inside Hell in a Cell. The first WrestleMania match to take place inside Hell in a Cell ended when The Undertaker executed a Tombstone Piledriver to Big Boss Man, who was then hanged from a noose with the help of The Brood and Paul Bearer.

=== The American Bad-Ass years (11–0) ===
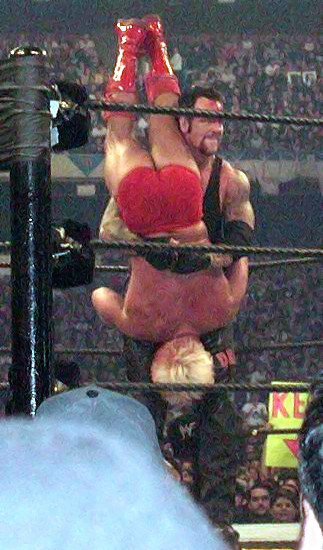
The Undertaker delivering a Tombstone Piledriver to Ric Flair

The Undertaker went on a hiatus in September 1999 to treat his groin injury and also tore his pectoral muscle, putting him out of action for eight months and missing Wrestlemania 2000 as a result. He returned to the company in May 2000 under his "American Badass" gimmick.

In early 2001, The Undertaker found Triple H's statement of having "already beaten everyone in the business" as arrogant and untrue as the two had never met in a one-on-one match before (in fact, they had met several times on Raw is War in 1999). Following various brawls between their respective allies, The Undertaker and Kane held Stephanie McMahon hostage until then-commissioner, William Regal, gave them matches against Triple H and the Big Show at WrestleMania X-Seven, respectively. Following a match involving a brawl through the crowd, The Undertaker finally pinned Triple H after using the Last Ride. This bout marked his first WrestleMania appearance under his "American Badass" biker persona.

At the No Way Out 2002 PPV, The Undertaker faced The Rock amidst a rivalry between the two, but would lose the match when Ric Flair interfered, sparking a feud between the two which led to a match at WrestleMania X8. Fought under No Disqualification rules, The Undertaker beat Flair after delivering a Tombstone Piledriver, despite interference from Arn Anderson. After the match, The Undertaker gestured his number of WrestleMania wins. In 2020, Calaway revealed in an interview with Stone Cold Steve Austin that he had chosen to face Flair over Rob Van Dam after receiving the two options from Vince McMahon, citing Flair's legendary wrestling status. Also, according to Ric Flair, he mentioned that prior to the storyline feud between the two, Triple H told him that The Undertaker wanted to wrestle him.

In late-2002, Big Show kayfabe injured The Undertaker, who would make his return at the 2003 Royal Rumble. Although The Undertaker defeated Big Show at No Way Out, A-Train would attack The Undertaker, while newcomer Nathan Jones would aid The Undertaker. Just prior to their match at WrestleMania XIX, however, Jones would be attacked by The Full Blooded Italians on Heat, turning the tag team match into a two-on-one handicap match instead. Jones helped The Undertaker win by delivering kicks to both Big Show and A-Train, and allowing The Undertaker to hit a Tombstone Piledriver on A-Train to get the pinfall win. This bout at WrestleMania XIX would be the final match The Undertaker would have under the "American Badass" persona.

=== Defending the Streak (14–0) ===
Survivor Series 2003 marked the end of The Undertaker's Big Evil persona, when he lost a Buried Alive Match against Vince McMahon due to interference from Kane. Reverting to his former Deadman persona, The Undertaker would haunt Kane throughout various matches in vignettes in the build up to the match, before his eventual return at WrestleMania XX. The Undertaker defeated Kane for the second time at WrestleMania by executing a Tombstone Piledriver.

As part of his "Legend Killer" gimmick, Randy Orton began seeking out The Undertaker, hoping to be the one to finally end the Streak at WrestleMania 21. Orton would go as far as attacking his on-screen girlfriend, Stacy Keibler, and WWE Legend Jake "The Snake" Roberts turning heel in the process, before The Undertaker accepted the challenge. The finish to the match came when Randy Orton attempted to execute a Tombstone Piledriver, only for it to be reversed by The Undertaker into one of his own. Speaking to Yahoo Sports in 2015, Orton reflected on the success of the match, saying: "We killed it. I reversed the chokeslam into the RKO, everybody bought it, he beat my ass and that was it. He picked up another win at 'Mania, and rightfully so, because I think the WrestleMania brand and Undertaker go hand in hand". This match marked the first time "The Streak" had been properly acknowledged since WrestleMania XI and 6 years later at WrestleMania X-Seven.

During the start of 2006, The Undertaker began his pursuit for the World Heavyweight Championship, held by Kurt Angle at the time. On an episode of SmackDown! that aired on March 3, Mark Henry cost The Undertaker the match, as well as the World Heavyweight Championship. As a result, Undertaker then challenged Henry to a casket match at WrestleMania 22. The Undertaker won the match when he put Henry inside the casket. In 2019, former WWE producer Bruce Prichard claimed that the initial plan set out by Vince McMahon was for Henry to win the match, with The Undertaker and other producers unreceptive to the idea. Kurt Angle claimed that Undertaker wanted to wrestle with him for a "5-star match" and let Angle break the Streak, but this plan wasn't accepted by McMahon. The match was instead held at No Way Out. Mark Henry later stated during his interview that, "Going into WrestleMania 22 against The Undertaker, is like playing Michael Jordan one-on-one."

=== Pursuit for the World Heavyweight Championship (16–0) ===
When we get in the ring together, I think it's magic. I think we always have the same goal, and that's just to give a heck of a competitive match. It's not easy with us both being babyfaces, but as long as we’re competitive and we're physical and give the crowd their money's worth and take them on a ride, then it's going to work. It's like a dream come true. Him being such a large man and so athletic, he's the perfect opponent for me.

— Batista in 2007

Having won the 2007 Royal Rumble, The Undertaker earned the opportunity to select his opponent for WrestleMania 23. With the option to wrestle Raw's WWE Champion John Cena, ECW World Champion Bobby Lashley, or SmackDown!'s World Heavyweight Champion Batista; The Undertaker chose Batista, thus staying on SmackDown!.

The Undertaker used his signature moves Snake Eyes, Old School, and a flying clothesline early on, before executing a suicide dive to Batista, who then retaliated by performing a running powerslam through the ECW broadcast table. Batista put The Undertaker back in the ring and attempted a pin to no avail as he kicked out. The Undertaker recovered with a Last Ride and a chokeslam, but was unable to score a pin from either move. Batista then hit a spear and his finishing move the Batista Bomb, but The Undertaker stunned everybody by kicking out. Batista tried another, but was countered and The Undertaker hit a Tombstone Piledriver to win the World Heavyweight Championship.

The genesis of the feud between The Undertaker and Edge began on the May 11, 2007, episode of SmackDown!, which saw The Undertaker successfully defend his World Heavyweight Championship in a draw against Batista in a steel cage match, after which The Undertaker was attacked by a returning Mark Henry; Edge capitalized by cashing in his Money in the Bank briefcase to win the championship from The Undertaker. When The Undertaker returned later that year, he restarted his feud with Batista, leading to championship matches between the pair at October's Cyber Sunday, followed by a Hell in a Cell match at Survivor Series in November, with Batista emerging victorious in both, the latter due to interference from a returning Edge. The trio would have a Triple Threat match at December's Armageddon PPV for the championship, which saw Edge become champion. In February 2008, The Undertaker would prevail in the SmackDown Elimination Chamber match at No Way Out to become the number one contender for Edge's championship at WrestleMania XXIV. Although The Undertaker entered the event undefeated to much acclaim, Edge had also never lost a singles match at WrestleMania. Edge described the match as "the biggest match of my career, bar none. The main event, against The Undertaker for the world championship, it doesn't get any better".

The match was full of reversals by Edge, including The Undertaker's signature moves Old School, the big boot, the Last Ride, and the Tombstone Piledriver, while hitting big moves of his own such as the Impaler DDT and the Edge-o-matic. The end of the match came when, despite Edge using a camera as a weapon, and interference from La Familia members The Edgeheads (Curt Hawkins and Zack Ryder), The Undertaker performed his Hell's Gate submission hold after being hit with Edge's finisher, the spear. Edge would submit, and for the second year in a row, The Undertaker won the World Heavyweight Championship at WrestleMania. Meanwhile, Edge later revealed in a podcast, that the original plan for the match was to be "Streak vs. Streak", as he was originally slated to win WrestleMania 23's Money in the Bank Ladder Match, but booking eventually shifted the win to Mr. Kennedy instead. Calaway's wife, Michelle McCool, revealed in 2020 that Edge refused the opportunity to break the Streak.

=== Shawn Michaels challenges the Streak (18–0) ===
What more could you ask for as a wrestling fan?

— Jim Ross at WrestleMania 25

After defeating Vladimir Kozlov on the March 2, 2009, episode of Raw, Shawn Michaels earned the right to challenge The Undertaker at WrestleMania 25. The feud revolved around a "good vs evil" story, with Michaels being a born again Christian, and Undertaker a Lucifer-type figure.

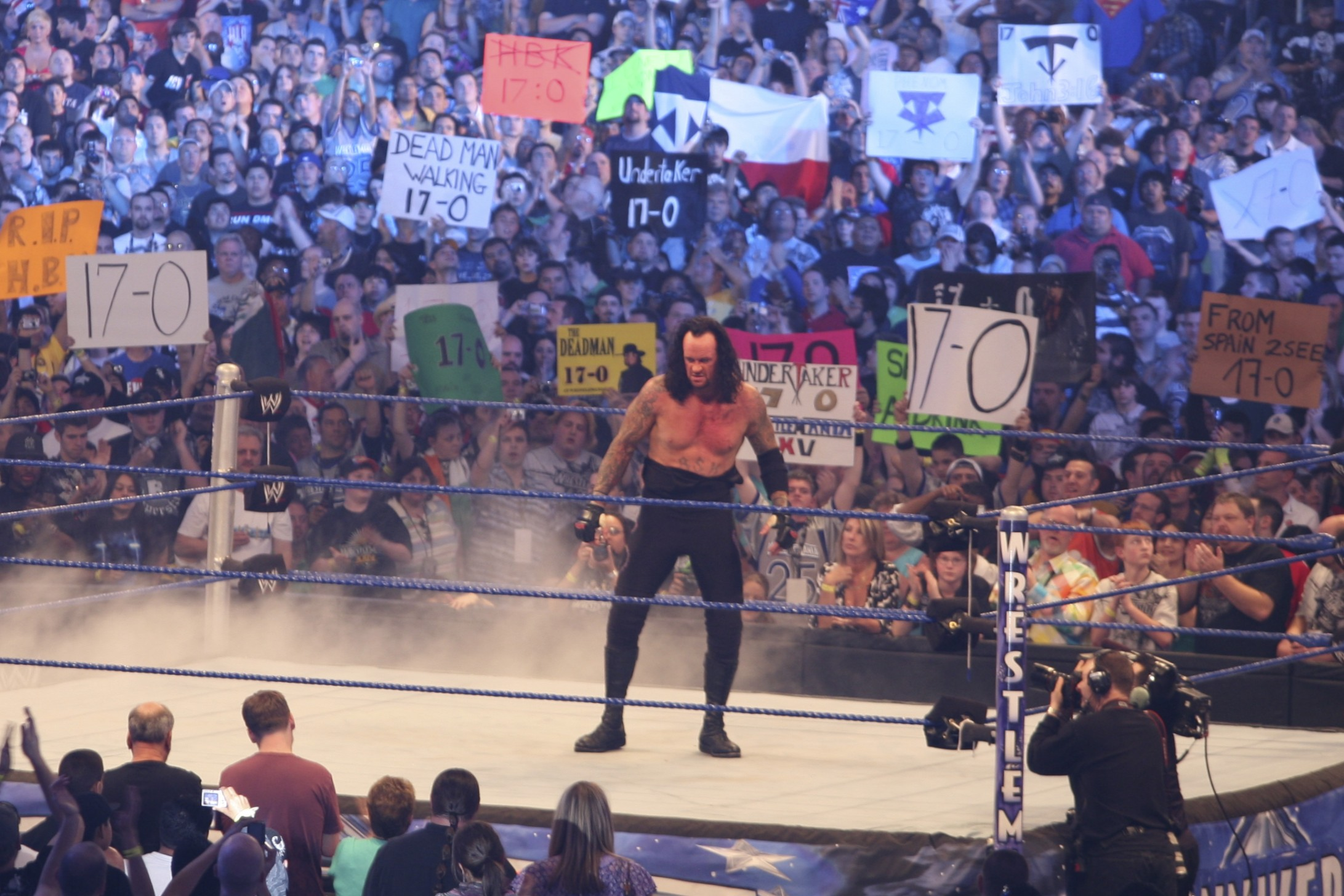
The Undertaker after defeating Shawn Michaels at WrestleMania 25

During the match, The Undertaker attempted his signature suicide dive, but Michaels pulled a cameraman in the way, leaving The Undertaker to land awkwardly on his neck; the spot was said to have "added more drama and emotion to the match, and gave it an element of realism". The cameraman was portrayed by Jimmy Snuka's son Sim Snuka, as a nod to The Undertaker's first WrestleMania match. The finish, described as "emotionally charged", involved The Undertaker using all four of his recognized finishers (Tombstone Piledriver, Last Ride, Chokeslam, Hell's Gate) without managing to finish the match on any occasion; The Undertaker's "wide-eyed look of sadness and desperation on his face" after Michaels kicked out of the Tombstone Piledriver was described as a "snapshot of the heart and passion that was on display at the spectacle". Michaels made a comeback, and eventually hit Sweet Chin Music, but The Undertaker kicked out. Soon after, Michaels attempted a top-rope moonsault, but was caught, and The Undertaker quickly executed a second Tombstone Piledriver to finally win the match. The match was described as "show-stealing" and an "instant classic", and was eventually hailed by many as the greatest bout in WrestleMania history.

The Undertaker initially rejected a rematch with Shawn Michaels at WrestleMania XXVI, saying "a rematch at this year's WrestleMania will only result in more bitter disappointment for yourself", before Michaels retaliated by saying "I'll see you at WrestleMania. Your streak, your title, your soul will be mine". At the Elimination Chamber PPV, Michaels cost The Undertaker his World Heavyweight Championship, coming out from under the ring and connecting with Sweet Chin Music and allowing Chris Jericho to pin him.

Towards the end, Michaels hit Sweet Chin Music on the outside, leaving The Undertaker lay on the broadcast table, before performing a top-rope moonsault, breaking the table. At the end of a 24-minute match, after kicking out of a Tombstone Piledriver, Michaels slapped The Undertaker, leading to The Undertaker executing a jumping Tombstone Piledriver on Michaels. As a result of the loss per the pre-match stipulations, Michaels retired from professional wrestling, a moment described as "the end of an era".

=== Final wins (21–0) ===
In the lead-up to WrestleMania XXVII, Triple H vowed to do what his best friend Michaels could not: end the Streak. After a near-30 minute bout, in a match contested under No Holds Barred rules, and after The Undertaker kicked out of a Tombstone Piledriver by Triple H, The Undertaker was triumphant when he locked in the Hell's Gate on Triple H; Triple H attempted to use a sledgehammer while in the hold, but was unable to do so before tapping out. Although victorious, The Undertaker could not walk out of the arena, and had to be stretchered to the back by paramedics. Calaway revealed in an interview in 2021 that this ending was planned to build the feud to the following year's WrestleMania.

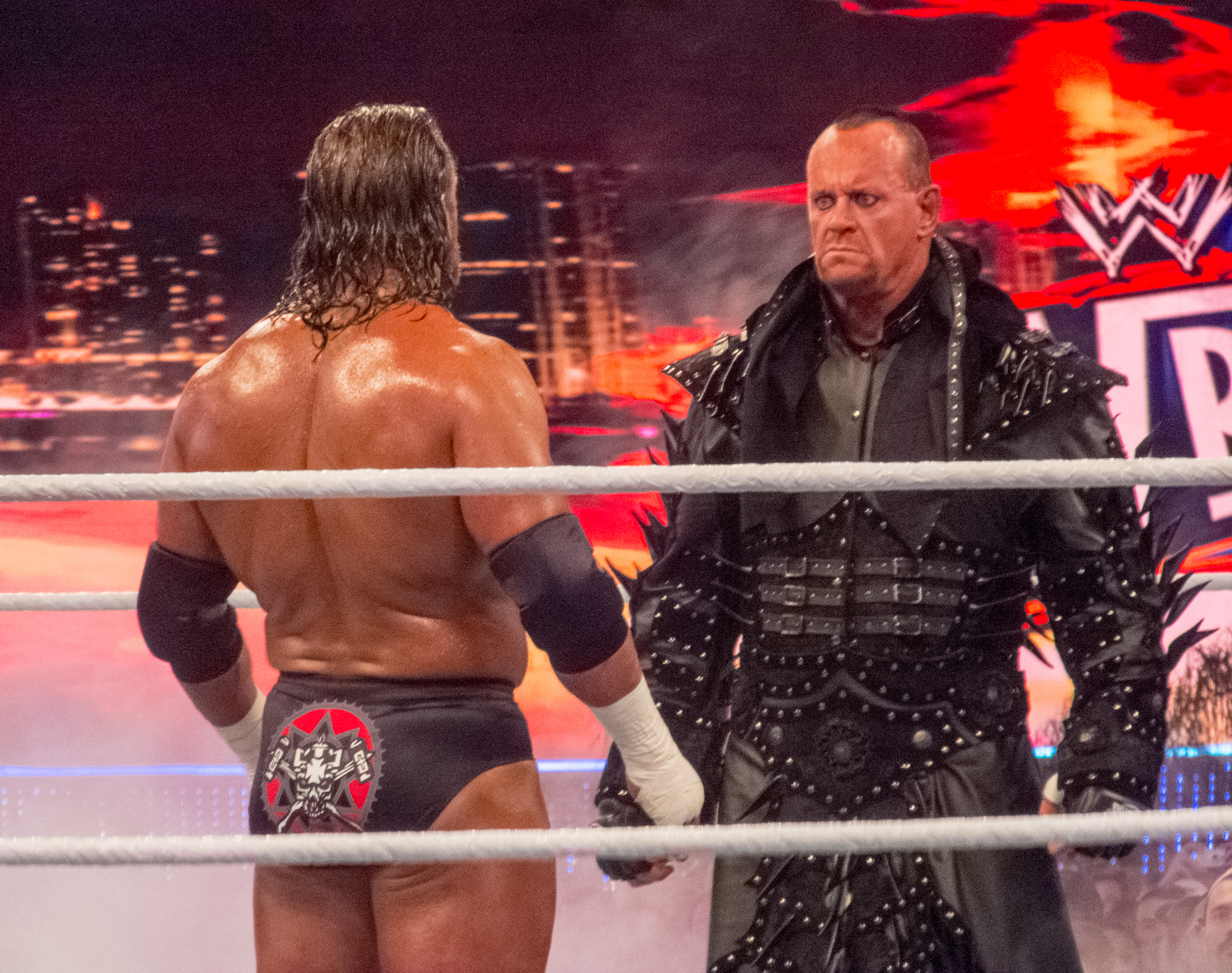
The Undertaker and Triple H facing off before their match

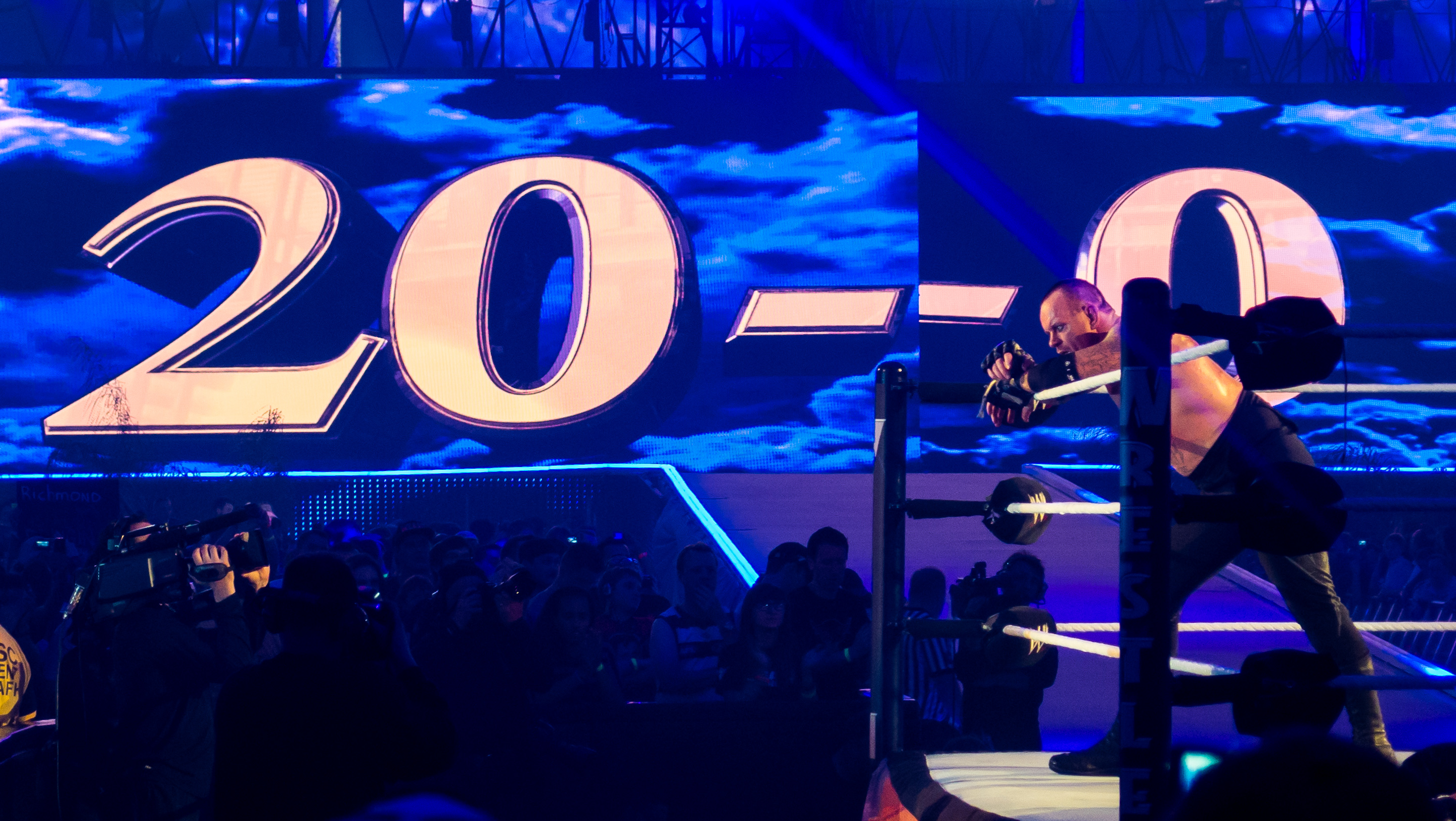
The Undertaker leaning on the ropes after his victory, with "20-0" being shown on the Titantron in the background

The Undertaker made the challenge, as he wanted to redeem himself against Triple H from the previous year, where he had to be stretchered out of the arena. Triple H initially rejected before accepting for WrestleMania XXVIII. Contested inside Hell in a Cell, and refereed by Shawn Michaels, the match, billed as the "End of an Era" began with both men brawling in and around the ring. Shortly afterwards, with the steel steps inside the ring, Triple H hit a spinebuster on The Undertaker, who then managed to lock in the Hell's Gate, which was countered when Triple H lifted him up and slammed him on the steel steps. The match was littered with weapon shots, including 16 consecutive chair shots by Triple H, followed by a sledgehammer shot to the skull, all the while The Undertaker instructed Michaels not to stop the match.

When being checked on by Michaels, The Undertaker locked him in the Hell's Gate, leaving him out cold. Replacement referee Charles Robinson ran down to the ring after The Undertaker hit a chokeslam on Triple H, but could only make a two-count, and was then on the receiving end of a chokeslam himself. Michaels recovered and hit The Undertaker with Sweet Chin Music followed by a Pedigree by Triple H, but this wasn't enough for the three count. Both men traded finishing moves for near-falls, before The Undertaker delivered his own series of chair shots for another two count. The Undertaker won shortly afterwards with a Tombstone Piledriver. It was praised as one of the greatest Hell in a Cell matches of all time, while Triple H thought it was one of his favorite matches of his career.

Honestly, I love it, that's why. I've got 26 years in the business and all these injuries, but WrestleMania has become so huge, it's just hard to walk away from it. I want the audience leaving the stadium going 'Wow!' It's a responsibility I have being a top dog in this business. The crowd will let me know when it's time to leave. They haven't yet. And if I didn't perform at WrestleMania, in some strange weird way, I'd feel like I was letting Vince McMahon down. I've been in the WWE for so long, and he's done so much for me.

— Calaway in 2013, on why he continued to wrestle

In a controversial angle the week before WrestleMania 29, CM Punk's manager Paul Heyman, dressed as, and using the mannerisms of, the recently deceased Paul Bearer, came out to confront The Undertaker whilst flanked by The Undertaker's signature druids. As The Undertaker attempted to assault them, Punk, in disguise as a druid, assaulted him before pouring the ashes of an urn, purporting to be those of Bearer's, over The Undertaker. In a 2020 interview, Calaway said that he was initially conflicted about the angle, but realized that Bearer "would have loved it", with storyline brother Kane stating it was "the biggest compliment and that's the biggest tribute". Heyman has described it as intentionally offensive and controversial. Punk has spoken of his frustrations with the build of the match, saying that he was disappointed not to be presented on television as a legitimate threat to the Streak, feeling he was "just another guy".

During the 22 minute match, Punk delivered a Macho Man elbow drop from the top rope onto The Undertaker, who was lay on the Spanish broadcast table. The Undertaker survived this, and, after Punk hit The Undertaker with the urn containing the alleged ashes of Paul Bearer, he still kicked out. The Undertaker reversed Punk's attempt to use his Go To Sleep (GTS) finishing move, and hit a Tombstone Piledriver to mark the final victory in the Streak.

== End of the Streak and aftermath ==
=== WrestleMania XXX (21–1) ===
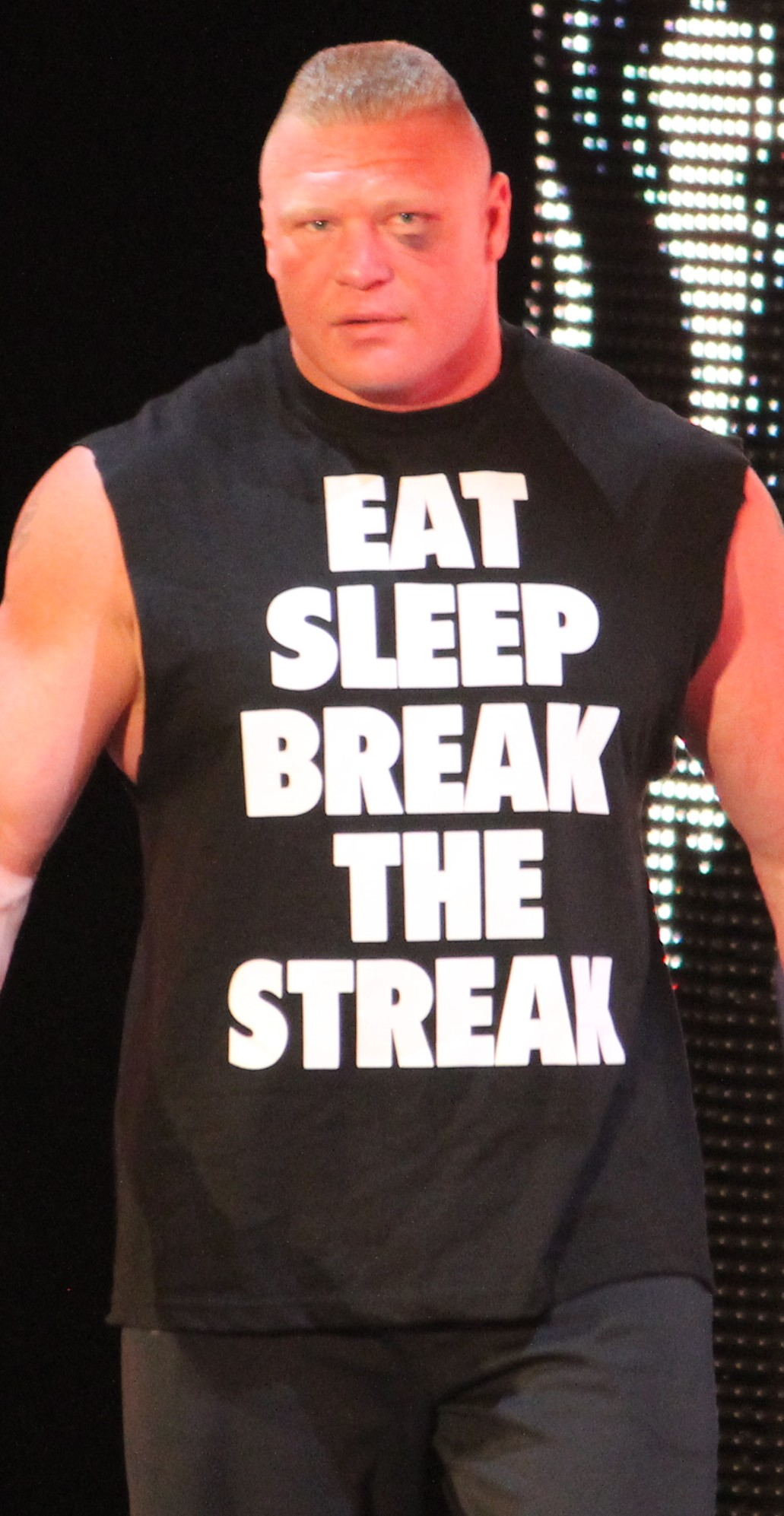
Brock Lesnar wore merchandise celebrating the end of the Streak the following day at Raw

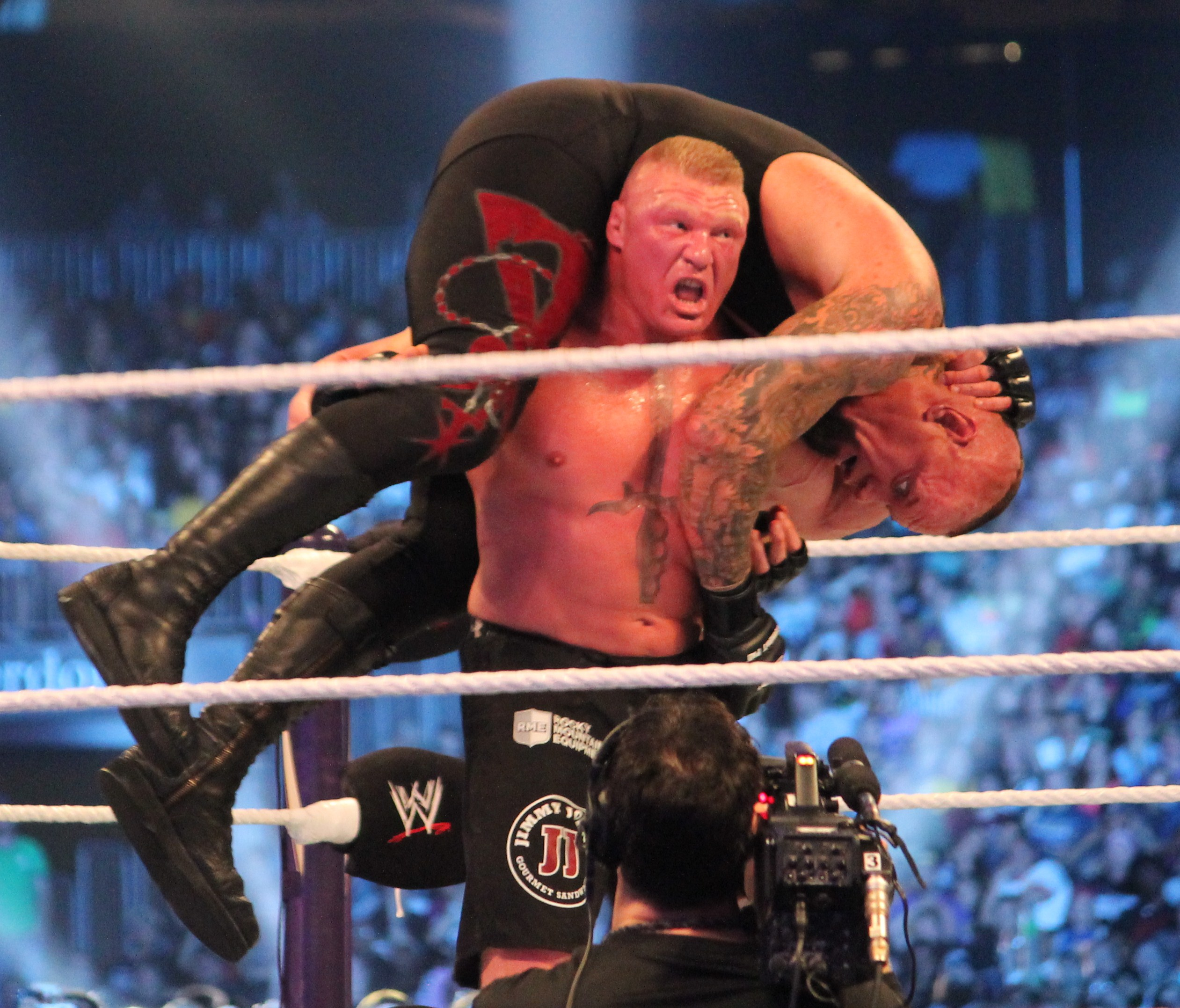
Lesnar setting up The Undertaker for an F5 during their match at WrestleMania XXX

On October 23, 2010, after losing his UFC Heavyweight Championship to Cain Velasquez at UFC 121, Brock Lesnar was confronted by The Undertaker, who asked, "you wanna do it?" The incident led to speculation about a WrestleMania match between the two, and was described by Fox Sports as the "genesis" of their feud. In a 2020 interview with Stone Cold Steve Austin following his retirement, Calaway said that the interaction with Lesnar at UFC 121 was to "start a buzz." At the time, he said he did not know if Lesnar was going to return to WWE, but he wanted to position himself for a match with him just in case and that came later than expected.

On the February 24, 2014, episode of Raw, The Undertaker appeared for the first time since The Shield performed a powerbomb on him through a broadcast table ten months earlier, to answer Lesnar's challenge for a match at WrestleMania XXX, scheduled for April 6 at the Mercedes-Benz Superdome in New Orleans. The Undertaker went into the match as the massive odds-on favorite, but after three F-5s, Lesnar pinned The Undertaker in 25 minutes and 12 seconds to end the undefeated WrestleMania streak, silencing and shocking the entire crowd in the process. Calaway was legitimately hospitalized afterwards with a severe concussion suffered early in the match. Lesnar's music was not played for a few minutes while WWE cameramen continued to highlight the reaction of a stunned crowd, and his manager Paul Heyman would compare the crowds' reaction to when Ivan Koloff defeated Bruno Sammartino for the WWWF Championship in Madison Square Garden in 1971. Heyman thereafter began using the victory to further promote his on-screen client and referred to himself as "the one behind the one in 21 and 1". Heyman later described himself as "giddy" at the prospect.

It was an unbelievable moment, it was an amazing moment, one of the top five in WrestleMania history and it was one of those things that was just a genuine reaction that came out of my mouth like, 'Oh my God, I can't believe this happened'

— Announcer Michael Cole recalling commentating the end of the streak

The match has been described as having the most shocking result since the Montreal Screwjob. A great number of fans objected to the outcome; Justin Henry of WrestleCrap made an impassioned defense of the decision, arguing that it elicited an emotional response that reduced him and other viewers "to the most base-ishness of our fanhood". Questioned by Austin about his decision to end the Streak, Vince McMahon said it was done to make a big deal of Lesnar and that there were no other viable candidates for the role. He added that Calaway was shocked by the decision, but willingly participated since he wanted to give back to the business. According to wrestling journalist Dave Meltzer, McMahon made the decision to end the Streak on the day of the show, believing it doubtful that he would have any more matches. During an interview on the Broken Skull Sessions with Stone Cold in November 2020 following his retirement, Calaway confirmed that the decision to end the Streak was made the day of the show, stating that he was still going over as of that morning. He also confirmed McMahon's opinion of there being no other viable candidate, but Calaway felt that Lesnar did not need the win as he was already a huge star. Jim Ross believes the Streak should not have been broken, as it was a unique selling point of WrestleMania.

=== After the streak (25–2) ===
Taking exception to Lesnar's boasting about ending The Streak, The Undertaker cost him a WWE World Heavyweight Championship victory at Battleground in July 2015, instigating a rematch between the two at the next month's SummerSlam. At SummerSlam on August 23, after a distraction and a low blow, The Undertaker gained his first televised singles victory over Lesnar when Lesnar passed out to Hell's Gate. A Hell in a Cell match between the pair at October's Hell in a Cell, billed as their final meeting, was won by Lesnar after a low blow and an F-5.

Following The Undertaker's WrestleMania XXX loss to Lesnar, he had five more matches at the annual event against:

- Bray Wyatt at WrestleMania 31
- Shane McMahon at WrestleMania 32 in a Hell in a Cell match
- Roman Reigns at WrestleMania 33 in a No Holds Barred match
- John Cena at WrestleMania 34
- AJ Styles at WrestleMania 36 in a Boneyard match

He won all but the match with Reigns, making his overall WrestleMania record 25–2. In a 2020 interview following his retirement, Calaway said losing the Streak to Reigns would have made "a lot more sense" for the impact on their respective careers.

== Reaction, discussion, and legacy ==
"Ultimately, the streak is one of the greatest accomplishments of my career and something I'll be synonymous with for my legacy".

— Mark Calaway discussing The Streak in 2020.

Shawn Michaels described the Streak as "phenomenal", and Stone Cold Steve Austin said it was "special".

== Media ==
WWE has released various DVDs covering the Streak, including one for the 15–0 milestone in 2008, and a four-disc set to mark the 20–0 milestone in 2012. An updated version including the final victory over CM Punk, as well as the loss to Brock Lesnar, was issued in 2015.

Video game WWE SmackDown vs. Raw 2011 features a Road to WrestleMania storyline in which the player can attempt to break the Undertaker's streak. WWE 2K14 features a more detailed the Streak mode, in which players can attempt to defend the Streak as The Undertaker. Alternatively, they can try to break it as any other wrestler in the game.

== See also ==
- Goldberg win streak
