= Holy Weather =

Studio album by Civil Twilight
- Released: 26 March 2012
- Recorded: 2010–2012
- Genre: Indie rock; alternative rock
- Length: 43:42
- Label: Wind-up
- Producer: John Congleton; Dan Carey

Civil Twilight chronology
Civil Twilight (2009)	Holy Weather (2012)	Story of an Immigrant (2015)

Singles from Holy Weather
- 1. "Fire Escape" Released: 21 February 2012

Holy Weather is the second album by South African alternative rock band Civil Twilight. Written and recorded in the years following their debut album, Civil Twilight, the album was released 26 March 2012 in both the United States and other regions including the United Kingdom, Canada and South Africa. The album has received generally positive reviews, with many comparing the outfit to early-generation U2.

== Background and development ==
After the release of their debut album, Civil Twilight toured around the United States and Europe playing at many popular venues including Bonnaroo in 2011. After returning from that tour, the band began work on the album. According to a blog post on their website, Burial, James Blake and The National were some of the big influences on the direction of their album.

== Critical reception ==
Professional ratings
Review scores
Source	Rating
Alternative Addition	4/5 stars
RRF	3.5/5
AllMusic	3.5/5 stars

Holy Weather has received generally positive reviews since its release. Many reviews have made connections between Civil Twilight and some of their contemporaries, such as Muse, U2 and Radiohead.

== Commercial performance ==
Holy Weather debuted at number three on the Billboard Heatseekers album chart. It stayed on the chart for more than two weeks, falling to number 31 by 13 April. The album also debuted at number 124 on the Billboard 200 and number 20 on the Rock Albums chart. The first single, "Fire Escape" charted at number 44 on the Rock Songs chart and number 22 on the Alternative Songs chart.

== Track listing ==
No.	Title	Writer(s)	Length
1.	"River"	Civil Twilight; McKellar	3:14
2.	"Holy Weather"	Civil Twilight; McKellar	4:56
3.	"Fire Escape"	Civil Twilight; McKellar	3:40
4.	"Move/Stay"	Civil Twilight; McKellar	3:14
5.	"Every Walk That I've Ever Taken Has Been in Your Direction"	Civil Twilight; McKellar	3:50
6.	"Highway of Fallen Kings"	Civil Twilight; McKellar	4:16
7.	"It's Over"	Civil Twilight; McKellar	3:43
8.	"Shape of a Sound"	Civil Twilight; McKellar	2:54
9.	"Sweet Resistance"	Civil Twilight; McKellar	4:07
10.	"Please Don't Find Me"	Civil Twilight; McKellar	4:14
11.	"Doorway"	Civil Twilight; McKellar	4:22
12.	"Wasted (iTunes bonus track)"	Civil Twilight; McKellar	3:23
13.	"Surrender (iTunes bonus track)"	Civil Twilight; McKellar	3:39
14.	"Church on Fire (iTunes bonus track)"	Civil Twilight; McKellar	3:14
15.	"Night is Cold (iTunes pre-order bonus track)"	Civil Twilight; McKellar	3:55

== Personnel ==
- Steven McKellar – bass guitar, lead vocals, keyboards
- Andrew McKellar – guitar, backing vocals
- Richard Wouters – drums, percussion
