= Civil Twilight (band) =

South African rock band

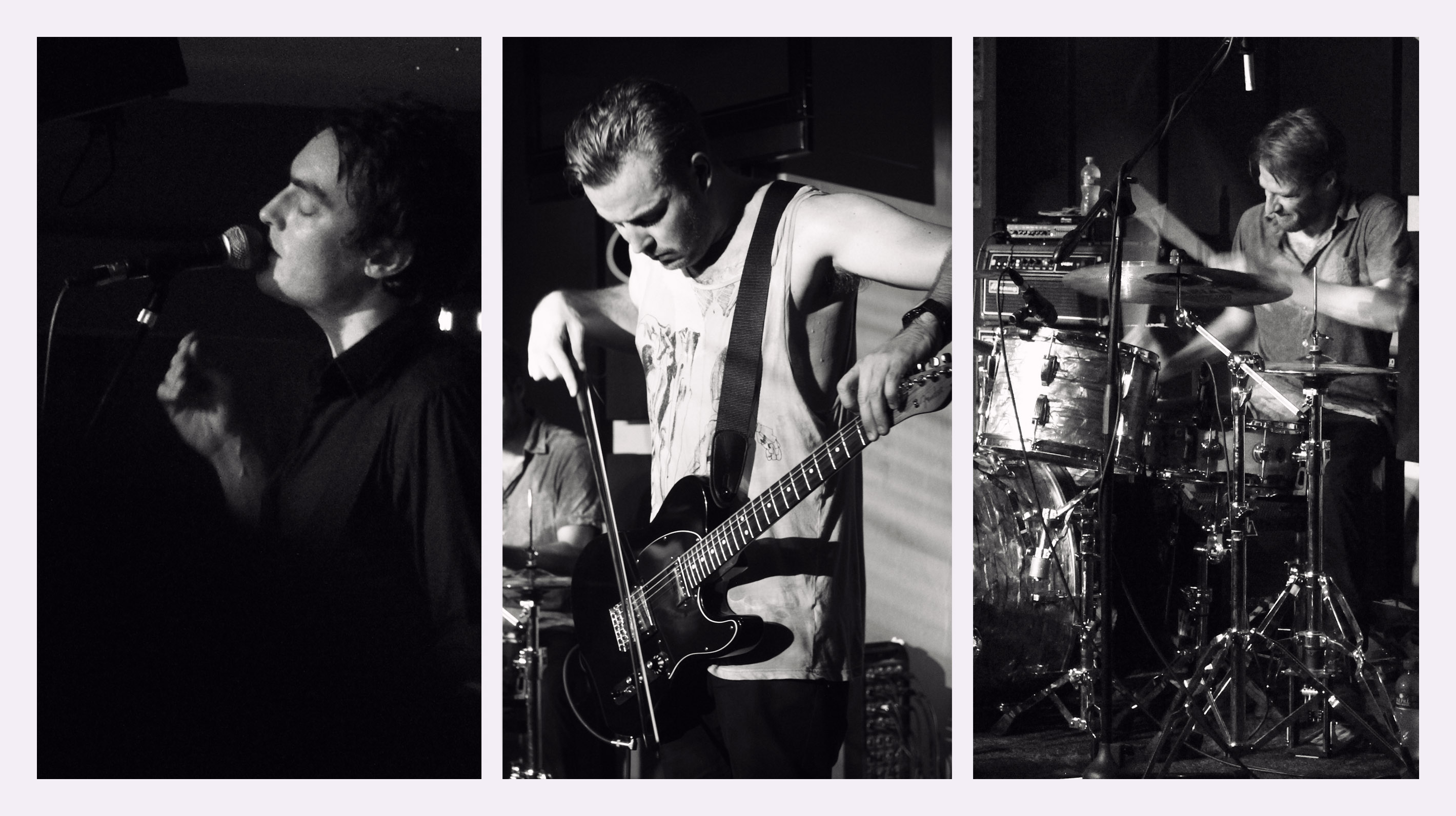
- Civil Twilight performing in 2010. L–R: Steven McKellar, Andrew McKellar, Richard Wouters.

Background information
- Origin: Cape Town, South Africa
- Genres: Alternative rock
- Years active: 1996–2016
- Label: Wind-up
- Members: Andrew McKellar; Richard Wouters; Steven McKellar; Kevin Dailey
- Website: civiltwilightmusic.com

Civil Twilight was a South African rock band from Cape Town, consisting of the brothers Andrew and Steven McKellar plus Richard Wouters and Kevin Dailey. They were signed to Wind-up Records, and released three studio albums – their self-titled debut album, Civil Twilight (2009), Holy Weather (2012), and Story of an Immigrant (2015).

== Origin ==
Originally hailing from Cape Town, Civil Twilight started as a trio that drew parallels with The Police and very early U2, Muse, Jeff Buckley, and Radiohead. Their music has been described as having impassioned vocals and classic song craft. Brothers Andrew and Steven McKellar were raised in a musical household, having explored their father's jazz collection at a young age while listening to their classically trained mother play piano. In November 1996, Andrew launched a teenaged band with help from his high school classmate, drummer Richard Wouters, who was just starting out in music. The two scheduled an inaugural rehearsal for the following month; in the interim, Andrew discovered that his younger brother, Steven, could sing and write songs. The three musicians subsequently banded together, with Steven agreeing to learn the bass.

== Career ==
Civil Twilight spent several years practicing in local church halls and garages before graduating to the local club scene, where they steadily became a well-respected act. Having finished their education, the bandmates then relocated to Los Angeles in August 2005; shortly thereafter, they signed with the indie label One October and co-produced their debut record, Human. The album arrived in 2007 and received an extra boost when several songs were featured in prime-time television shows, including One Tree Hill, House, Star-Crossed and Terminator: The Sarah Connor Chronicles. As their profile mounted, the musicians relocated to Nashville.

Their musical influences, interests, and heroes range from Oasis to Wilco, The National to Grizzly Bear.

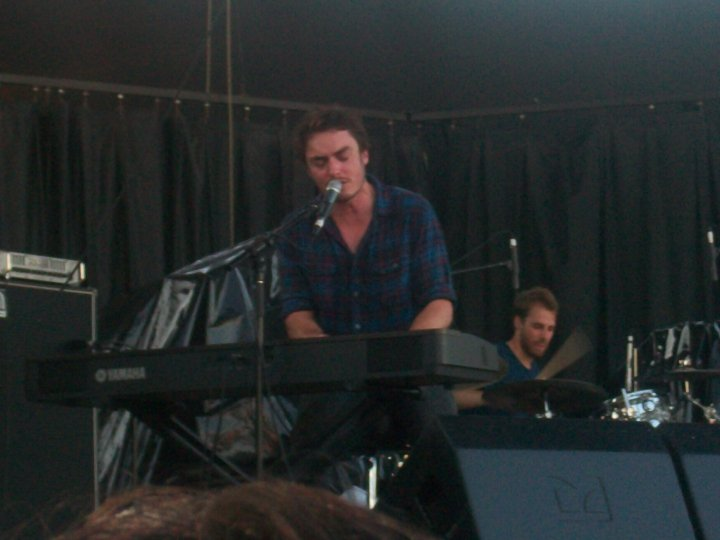
Civil Twilight performing in 2010

In 2012, they headlined a US tour (with Morning Parade opening up), supported two months with Mutemath, and various dates with Young the Giant. Past tour mates have also included Florence + the Machine, Smashing Pumpkins, Anberlin, Neon Trees, Jimmy Eat World, Silversun Pickups, and Of Monsters and Men.

Civil Twilight played the Main stages of 2012 festivals such as Austin City Limits, Bumbershoot (their 2nd visit), Milwaukee Summerfest (their third visit), and Music Midtown 2011 also saw them play most every major festival in the US, including but not limited to, Bonnaroo, Voodoo, Hangout, Mountain Jam, 80–35, Vh1's Best Cruise Ever, Rivers Edge, and a headline performance at the Rockin' the Daisies festival in Cape Town, South Africa.

Civil Twilight's debut single in 2010, "Letters from the Sky", reached #5 on the Alternative radio charts and remained in the Top 10 for six months of the year, with over 1,000 spins throughout Texas, and from Philadelphia to Seattle, selling over 200,000 copies.

Their last single "Fire Escape" charted Top 20 Alternative, and received extensive coverage on Vh1, Fuse and MTV.

Their songs have been featured in many TV spots, including One Tree Hill and Terminator: The Sarah Connor Chronicles. "Quiet in My Town" was prominently featured at the end of season 6, episode 3 Get Cape. Wear Cape. Fly. of One Tree Hill on The CW Network. It played for 6 minutes during the coda – the scene of Quentin's funeral. They have also had songs on Vampire Diaries and the movie, Underworld: Awakening.

"Letters from the Sky" was featured at the end of Episode 11 of Harper's Island. In addition to this, the song was also featured on season 7 of One Tree Hill, in the opening scene of the episode You Are a Runner and I Am My Father's Son. The song has also featured at the end of the film I Am Number Four left behind 2014. It was also featured in Shameless season 8 episode 7 as Lip pays a visit to Professor Youens in his new living situation. "Letters from the Sky" also featured prominently in the 10th episode of series 7 of The Mentalist. "Letters from the Sky" was also used by World Wrestling Entertainment for the promo video between Dwayne "The Rock" Johnson and John Cena for their Championship match at WrestleMania 29. "Letters from the Sky" was the iTunes Free Download of the Week for the week of 6–12 October 2009.

The band's self-titled album was originally released independently in 2008. Having now signed to Wind-up Records, this album was due to be re-released 31 March 2009; however, due to scheduling issues it was pushed back. It was eventually released 21 July 2009.

Civil Twilight's album Holy Weather came out 26 March 2012. Kevin Dailey from Charlotte, North Carolina, also joined the band around this time.

On 2 March 2015, the band released a new song, titled "Story of an Immigrant", and announced their new album of the same name. In a statement, the band has this to say about the new track: "This song both lyrically and musically seemed to set the course for the new music we were writing. It was the first song written for the new record where we all collectively went, 'I like this. Let's keep going in this direction.' We think musically it very naturally links our past with where we're headed—and lyrically it's in many ways the story of our lives, our band, and our journey". The album was released on 10 July 2015.

In October 2017, at the Linkin Park and Friends: Celebrate Life in Honor of Chester Bennington tribute concert, Linkin Park's Mike Shinoda spoke about how Talinda, Chester Bennington's widow, had described that Bennington was a fan of Steve McKellar's voice, so McKellar was invited to join the tribute concert, performing vocals on "Nobody Can Save Me" and "Waiting for the End".

== Members ==
- Steven McKellar – bass, lead vocals, keyboards, piano
- Andrew McKellar – guitar, violin bow, backing vocals
- Richard Wouters – drums, percussion
- Kevin Dailey – keyboards, guitar, backing vocals

== Discography ==
=== Studio albums ===
List of studio albums, with selected chart positions
Title	Album details	Peak chart positions			
Title	Album details	US	US Alt.	US Heat.	US Rock
Civil Twilight	Released: 21 July 2009; Label: Wind-up; Formats: CD, digital download	—	—	16	—
Holy Weather	Released: 26 March 2012; Label: Wind-up; Formats: CD, digital download	124	20	3	31
Story of an Immigrant	Released: 10 July 2015; Label: Wind-up; Formats: CD, digital download	—	—	4	—
"—" denotes a recording that did not chart or was not released in that territory.

=== Extended plays ===
- iTunes Live from SoHo, 2010
- Holy Weather Remix EP, 2012

=== Singles ===
List of singles, with selected chart positions, showing year released and album name
Title	Year	Peak chart positions		Album
Title	Year	US Alt.	US Rock	Album
"Quiet in My Town"	2009	—	—	Civil Twilight
"Letters from the Sky"	2009	7	25	Civil Twilight
"Soldier"	2009	—	—	Civil Twilight
"Anybody Out There"	2010	—	—	Civil Twilight
"Next to Me"	2011	—	—	Civil Twilight
"Fire Escape"	2012	21	44	Holy Weather
"River"	2012	—	—	Holy Weather
"Too Far Gone"	2013	—	—	single only
"Story of an Immigrant"	2015	—	—	Story of an Immigrant
"Holy Dove"	2015	38	—	Story of an Immigrant
"—" denotes a recording that did not chart or was not released in that territory.

== TV and film appearances ==
Song	Show / Promo
"Human"	Blackstone (TV series); Alias; Without a Trace; House M.D.; WWE promo for the Bret Hart/Vince McMahon match at WrestleMania 26; The Vampire Diaries; Star-Crossed
"Quiet in My Town"	One Tree Hill; 2010 Celebrity Rehab
"Letters from the Sky"	Harper's Island; One Tree Hill; Terminator: The Sarah Connor Chronicles; WWE promo for the John Cena/Randy Orton match at WWE Bragging Rights (2009); Big Love Season 5 trailer; Celebrity Rehab with Dr. Drew Season 4, Episode 10; Jimmy Kimmel 27 April 2010; I Am Number Four; 24/7 Pacquiao vs. Margarito Episode 1; The Event 7 March 2-Hour Premiere; A Gifted Man Season 1 finale.; The Voice UK Series 1, Blind Auditions Day 4; WWE promo for the John Cena/The Rock match at WrestleMania XXIX; Defiance promo; The East Trailer; Necessary Roughness Season 2, Episode 1; Left Behind Trailer; The Originals Season 2, Episode 6 (Wheel Inside the Wheel); The Mentalist Season 7, Episode 10 (Nothing Gold Can Stay); Shameless (US) Season 8, Episode 7 (Occupy Fiona)
"Next to Me"	Degrassi – Season 10 episode "Try Honesty-Part 1"; Arrow Season 1, Muse of Fire
"Fire Escape"	The Vampire Diaries; Pretty Little Liars Season 3, Episode 11; Killjoys Season 1, Episode 1
"Dying to Be Born"	The Vampire Diaries
"How'm I Supposed to Die"	Underworld: Awakening; Wynonna Earp Season 1, Episode 3 (Leavin' on Your Mind)
"Come As You Are"	Defiance Season 1, Episode 2
"Too Far Gone"	Low Winter Sun Season 1, Episode 3
"The Courage or the Fall"	Arrow Season 3, Episode 2; Deadbeat Season 1, Episode 9; Pretty Little Liars Season 4, Episode 18
"Holy Dove"	Shadowhunters Season 1, Episode 3; Quantico Season 1
