= Civil Twilight (album) =

Studio album by Civil Twilight
- Released: 21 July 2009
- Recorded: 2005–2007
- Genre: Indie rock; alternative rock
- Length: 67:42
- Label: Wind-up
- Producer: Civil Twilight; Noel Golden; Michael Carney

Civil Twilight chronology
Civil Twilight (2009)	Holy Weather (2012)

Singles from Civil Twilight
- 1. "Letters from the Sky" Released: 17 July 2010; 2. "Human" Released: 30 September 2010

The self-titled debut studio album by South African alternative rock band Civil Twilight was released on 21 July 2009. It features many alternative rock and classical influences. Many have drawn parallels between the band's debut and the early work of U2 along with Muse. Steven McKellar's vocals have been compared to that of Radiohead's Thom Yorke and Jeff Buckley. During its original independent release by the band in 2007, the album was originally titled Human.

== Singles ==
"Letters from the Sky" was the first single to be released from this album. It reached number seven on Billboard Alternative Songs chart. It also reached number 25 on the Rock Songs chart. It is their best charting single to date on that chart.

== Critical reception ==
Professional ratings
Review scores
Source	Rating
Consequence of Sound	4/5 stars
Sputnikmusic	3.0/5

Civil Twilight received general acclaim from those who reviewed it, with three main reviewers giving positive ratings.

== Commercial performance ==
Civil Twilight charted at number 16 on the Billboard Heatseekers chart. Its first single, "Letters from the Sky", peaked at number seven on the Alternative Songs chart and at number 25 on the Rock Songs chart.

== In popular culture ==
The song "Human" was not only used in an episode of Alias, but also in a promo for the match between Vince McMahon and Bret Hart at WrestleMania XXVI.

"Human" was also used in the ending of the House episode "Frozen".

"Letters from the Sky" has been used multiple times.

On film it played during the closing credits of the film I Am Number Four, the trailer for Left Behind and in the film Legendary.

In television, it can be heard in the episodes of the series Harper's Island, The Mentalist, One Tree Hill, Shameless and The Originals.

The song also went on to be used in many different media promotions, used for the Iron man match between John Cena and Randy Orton for the WWE Championship at WWE Bragging Rights and the rematch between Cena and The Rock for the WWE Championship at WrestleMania 29, the WTA's "Strong is Beautiful" campaign in 2011 and teasers for the Syfy's Defiance and The Event's spring return.

== Track listing ==
Lyrics by Steven Mckellar.

All music are credited to Steven McKellar, Andrew McKellar and Richard Wouters. However, the actual composers of each song are listed below.

No.	Title	Music	Length
1.	"Anybody Out There"	A. Mckellar; S. Mckellar; Wouters	6:18
2.	"Soldier"	S. Mckellar; A. Mckellar	3:21
3.	"Next to Me"	S. Mckellar	3:44
4.	"Letters from the Sky"	S. Mckellar	4:35
5.	"On the Surface"	S. Mckellar; Wouters	3:50
6.	"Trouble"	S. Mckellar; A. Mckellar; Wouters	5:28
7.	"Human"	S. Mckellar	4:10
8.	"Perfect Stranger"	S. Mckellar; A. Mckellar; Wouters	5:47
9.	"What You Want"	A. Mckellar; S. Mckellar	6:36
10.	"Something She Said"	S. Mckellar; A. Mckellar; Wouters	5:10
11.	"Quiet in My Town"	A. Mckellar; S. Mckellar	6:36
12.	"Run Dry (deluxe edition bonus track)"	S. Mckellar; A. Mckellar	4:17
13.	"Save Yourself (deluxe edition bonus track)"	S. Mckellar	3:33
14.	"Stolen (deluxe edition bonus track)"	A. Mckellar	5:08

== Personnel ==
- Steven McKellar – bass guitar, lead vocals, keyboards
- Andrew McKellar – guitar, backing vocals
- Richard Wouters – drums, percussion
