= Chris Jericho =

American-Canadian professional wrestler, rock musician, and actor (born 1970)

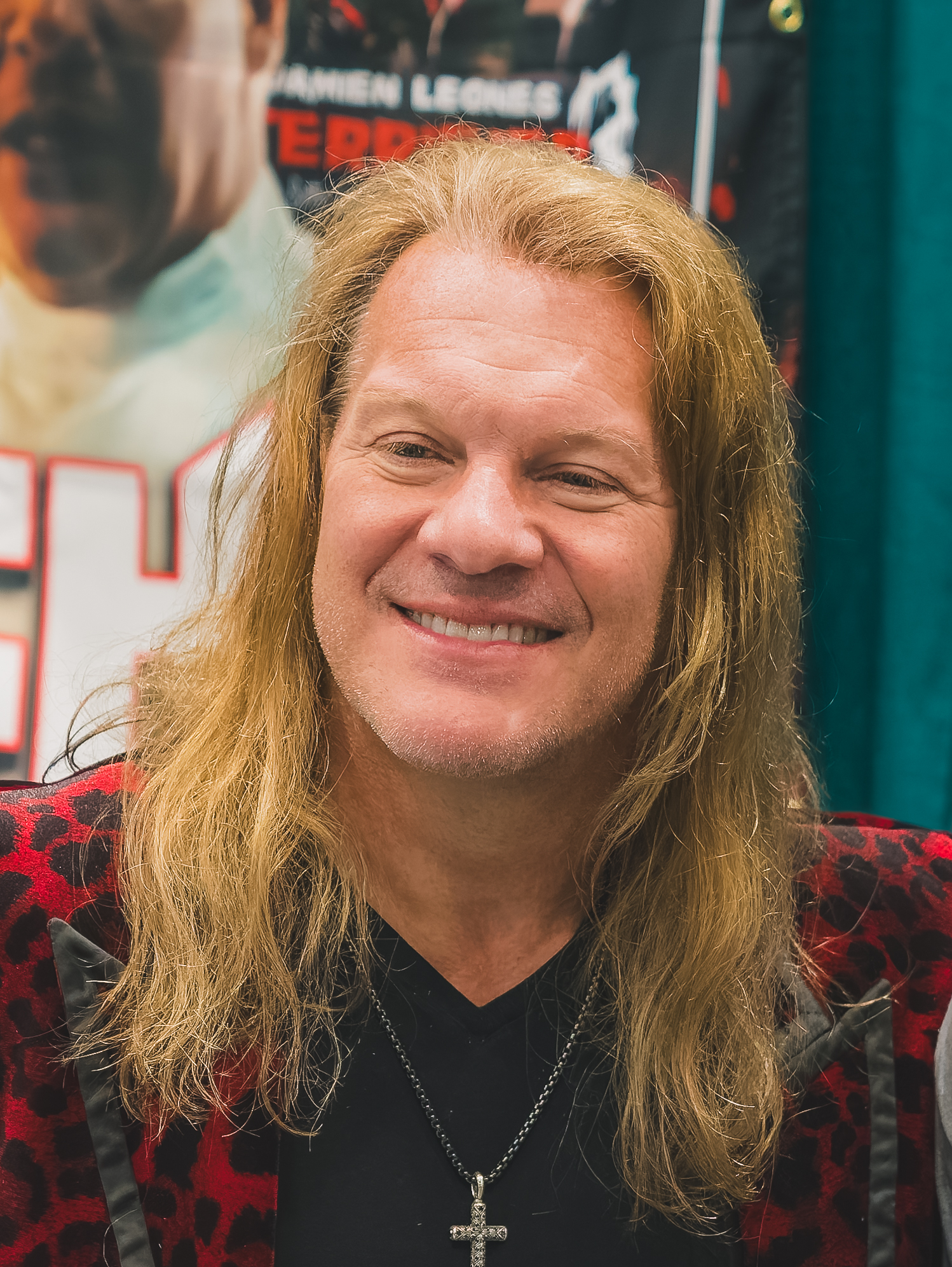
- Jericho in 2026
- Born: Christopher Keith Irvine; November 9, 1970 (age 56); Manhasset, New York, U.S.
- Education: Red River College
- Occupations: Professional wrestler; singer; podcaster; actor; author
- Spouse: Jessica Lockhart (m. 2000)
- Children: 3
- Relatives: Ted Irvine (father)
- Professional wrestling career
- Website: chrisjericho.com talkisjericho.com webisjericho.com
- Ring names: Chris Jericho; Corazón de León; Jericho; Lionheart; León D'Oro; Lion Do; Painmaker; Super Liger
- Billed height: 6 ft 0 in (183 cm)
- Billed weight: 227 lb (103 kg)
- Billed from: Calgary, Alberta, Canada; Manhasset, New York; Winnipeg, Manitoba, Canada
- Trained by: Brad Young; Ed Langley; Keith Hart; Stu Hart
- Debut: October 2, 1990

Christopher Keith Irvine (born November 9, 1970), better known by the ring name Chris Jericho, is an American-Canadian professional wrestler, rock musician, and actor. As of January 2019, he is signed to All Elite Wrestling (AEW), where he is also referred to mononymously as Jericho.

During the 1990s, Jericho performed for American organizations Extreme Championship Wrestling (ECW) and World Championship Wrestling (WCW), as well as for promotions in countries such as Canada, Japan, and Mexico. In the latter half of 1999, he made his debut in the World Wrestling Federation (WWF, renamed WWE in 2002). In 2001, he became the first Undisputed WWF Champion, and thus the final holder of the WCW World Heavyweight Championship (then referred to as the World Championship), having won and unified the WWF and World titles by defeating Stone Cold Steve Austin and The Rock on the same night. Jericho headlined multiple pay-per-view (PPV) events during his time with the WWF/WWE, including WrestleMania X8 and the inaugural TLC: Tables, Ladders & Chairs and the Elimination Chamber matches and the shows themselves. He was inducted into the Wrestling Observer Newsletter Hall of Fame in 2010.

Jericho won the Undisputed WWF Championship once, the WCW/World Championship twice, and the World Heavyweight Championship (2002–2013 version) three times. He has also held the WWE Intercontinental Championship a record nine times and was the ninth Triple Crown Champion, as well as the fourth Grand Slam Champion in history. In addition, he was the 2008 Superstar of the Year Slammy Award winner and (along with Big Show as Jeri-Show) won the 2009 Tag Team of the Year Slammy Award—making him the only winner of both Superstar and Tag Team of the Year.

After his departure from WWE in 2018, Jericho signed with New Japan Pro-Wrestling (NJPW), where he became a one-time IWGP Intercontinental Champion, becoming the first man to have held both the WWE and IWGP versions of the Intercontinental Championship. In January 2019, Jericho joined All Elite Wrestling (AEW) and became the inaugural holder of the AEW World Championship in August of that year. While in AEW, Jericho would also capture the ROH World Championship (the main title of AEW's sister promotion Ring of Honor) twice and the FTW Championship. All totaled between WWE, WCW, ECW, AEW, ROH and NJPW, Jericho has won 37 total championships (including nine world titles).

In 1999, Jericho became the lead vocalist of the heavy metal band Fozzy, who released their eponymous debut album the following year. The group's early work is composed largely of cover versions, although they have focused primarily on original material from their third album, All That Remains (2005), onward. Jericho has also appeared on numerous television shows over the years, including the 2011 season of Dancing with the Stars. He hosted the ABC game show Downfall, the 2011 edition of the Revolver Golden Gods Awards, and the UK's Metal Hammer Golden Gods Awards in 2012 and 2017.

== Early life ==
Christopher Keith Irvine was born in Manhasset, New York on November 9, 1970, the son of a Canadian couple. He is of Scottish descent from his father's side and Ukrainian descent from his mother's side. His father, ice hockey player Ted Irvine, had been playing for the New York Rangers at the time of Jericho's birth. When his father retired, the family moved back to Winnipeg, Manitoba, where Irvine grew up. He holds dual American and Canadian citizenships. He attended Red River College in Winnipeg, graduating in 1990 with a diploma in Creative Communications.

Irvine's interest in professional wrestling began when he started watching the local American Wrestling Association (AWA) events that took place at the Winnipeg Arena with his family, and his desire to become a professional wrestler himself began when he saw footage of Owen Hart, then appearing with Stampede Wrestling, performing various high-flying moves. In addition, Irvine also cited Owen's older brother Bret, Ricky Steamboat and Shawn Michaels as inspirations for him becoming a professional wrestler. His first experience with a professional wrestling promotion was when he acted as part of the ring crew for the first tour of the newly opened Keystone Wrestling Alliance promotion, where he learned important pointers from independent wrestlers Catfish Charlie and Caveman Broda.

== Professional wrestling career ==
=== Early career (1990-1996) ===
At the age of 19, Jericho entered the Hart Brothers School of Wrestling, where he met Lance Storm on his first day and was trained by Ed Langley and Brad Young. He made his debut as "Cowboy" Chris Jericho at the Moose Hall in Ponoka, Alberta, on October 2, 1990, in a ten-minute time-limit draw against Storm, with whom he then formed the tag team Sudden Impact. Jericho later said that he had intended to use the ring name "Jack Action", but blurted out "Chris Jericho" when pressed, taking "Jericho" from the album Walls of Jericho by the German power metal band Helloween. Jericho and Storm worked for Tony Condello on tours of Northern Manitoba alongside Adam Copeland, Jason Reso, and Terry Gerin, and also wrestled for Calgary's Canadian National Wrestling Alliance and Canadian Rocky Mountain Wrestling. In October 1991, the pair toured Japan with Frontier Martial-Arts Wrestling (FMW), where Jericho befriended Ricky Fuji; he returned in September 1992 with Eric Freeze, defeating Eiji Ezaki and Koji Nakagawa at the FMW 3rd Anniversary Show in Yokohama Stadium.

In the winter of 1992, Jericho traveled to Mexico, wrestling as Leon D'Oro and later Corazón de León for several small promotions in Nuevo León before joining Consejo Mundial de Lucha Libre (CMLL) in April 1993. There, he held the NWA World Middleweight Championship for 11 months starting in December 1993, and he made his last appearance for the company in September 1995 before returning in 2024, when he lost to Mistico at the 91st CMLL Anniversary Show. From February 1994, he also wrestled regularly in Japan for Genichiro Tenryu's Wrestling and Romance (WAR) as "Lion Heart", losing the NWA title to Último Dragón in November 1994. He won the WAR International Junior Heavyweight Championship in June 1995, joined the heel stable Fuyuki-Gun, and won the International Junior Heavyweight Tag Team Championship with Gedo in February 1996 before leaving the promotion that July. In between Japanese tours, Jericho and Storm competed in Smoky Mountain Wrestling from March 1994 as the babyface tag team the Thrillseekers, leaving after a street fight win over the Heavenly Bodies in August 1994, having suffered a broken arm in training. Recommended to promoter Paul Heyman by Chris Benoit, Dave Meltzer, Perry Saturn, and Mick Foley, Jericho joined Extreme Championship Wrestling in February 1996, where he defeated Rob Van Dam and won the ECW World Television Championship from Pitbull #2 in June. He lost the title to Shane Douglas in a four-way dance at Heat Wave the following month and left after losing to 2 Cold Scorpio in August 1996, having by then attracted the attention of World Championship Wrestling (WCW).

=== World Championship Wrestling (1996–1999) ===
==== Early appearances (1996–1997) ====
Jericho debuted for WCW on August 20, 1996, by defeating Mr. JL, which aired on the August 31 episode of WCW Saturday Night. Jericho's televised debut in WCW occurred on the August 26 episode of WCW Monday Nitro against Alex Wright in a match which ended in a no contest. He made his pay-per-view debut on September 15 against Chris Benoit in a losing effort at Fall Brawl '96: War Games. The following month, at Halloween Havoc, Jericho lost to nWo member Syxx due to biased officiating by nWo referee Nick Patrick. This led to a match between Jericho and Patrick at World War 3, which stipulated that Jericho's one arm would be tied behind his back. Despite the odds stacked against him, Jericho won the match. Later that night, Jericho participated in the World War 3 match for a future WCW World Heavyweight Championship match but failed to win the match.

Jericho represented WCW against nWo Japan member Masahiro Chono in a losing effort at the nWo Souled Out event. At SuperBrawl VII, Jericho unsuccessfully challenged Eddie Guerrero for the WCW United States Heavyweight Championship.

==== Cruiserweight Champion (1997–1998) ====
On June 28, 1997, Jericho defeated Syxx at a Saturday Nitro house show in Los Angeles, California to win the WCW Cruiserweight Championship, his first championship with WCW. He lost the title to Alex Wright a month later on Monday Nitro. He lost a second title match with Wright at Road Wild before reclaiming the Cruiserweight Championship from Wright in an August 16 match on Saturday Night. Jericho defended the championship against Eddie Guerrero at Clash of the Champions XXXV before losing to Guerrero in September at Fall Brawl, ending his second cruiserweight title run. He won the title again in January with a victory over Rey Mysterio Jr. at Souled Out, after which Jericho turned heel and assaulted Mysterio's knee with a toolbox. After Jericho repeatedly refusing requests from Juventud Guerrera for a title match, the two fought a title versus mask match at SuperBrawl VIII where Guerrera lost and removed his mask. Following this match, Jericho began a gimmick of collecting and wearing to the ring trophies from his defeated opponents, such as Guerrera's mask, Prince Iaukea's Hawaiian dress, and a headband from Disco Inferno.

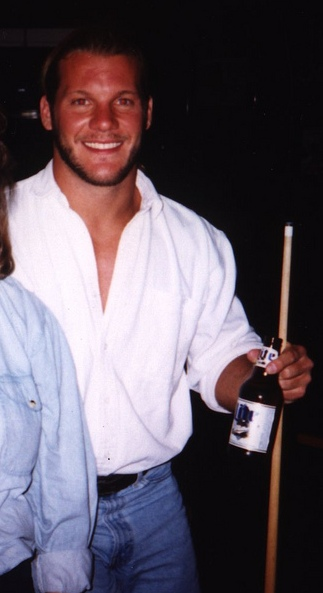
Jericho after a taping of WCW Monday Nitro in 1998

Jericho then began a long feud with Dean Malenko, in which Jericho repeatedly claimed he was a better wrestler than Malenko, but refused to wrestle him. Because of his mastery of technical wrestling, Malenko was known as "The Man of 1,000 Holds", so Jericho claimed to be "The Man of 1,004 Holds"; Jericho mentions in his autobiography that this line originated from an IWA interview he saw as a child, where manager Floyd Creatchman claimed that Leo Burke, the first professional wrestler to be known as "The Man of 1,000 Holds", was now known as "The Man of 1,002 Holds", to which Floyd Creatchman stated that "he learned two more".

During the March 30, 1998, episode of Nitro, after defeating Marty Jannetty, Jericho pulled out a long scroll of paper that purportedly listed each of the 1,004 holds he knew and recited them to the audience. Many of the holds were fictional, and nearly every other hold was an armbar. On the March 12, 1998, episode of WCW Thunder, Malenko defeated a wrestler wearing Juventud Guerrera's mask who appeared to be Jericho. However, the masked wrestler was actually Lenny Lane, whom Jericho bribed to appear in the match. This started a minor feud between Lane and Jericho after Jericho refused to pay Lane. At Uncensored, Jericho finally wrestled Malenko and defeated him, after which Malenko took a leave of absence from wrestling. Jericho then proceeded to bring with him to the ring a portrait of Malenko that he insulted and demeaned.

Just prior to Slamboree, J. J. Dillon (referred to by Jericho as "Jo Jo") scheduled a cruiserweight Battle Royal, the winner of which would immediately have a shot at Jericho's Cruiserweight Championship. Jericho accepted on the grounds that whoever he faced would be too tired to win a second match. At Slamboree, Jericho came out to introduce the competitors in an insulting fashion before the match started and then went backstage for coffee. An individual who appeared to be Ciclope won the battle royal after Juventud Guerrera shook his hand and then eliminated himself. The winner was a returning Malenko in disguise. Following one of the loudest crowd reactions in WCW history, Malenko proceeded to defeat Jericho for the championship.

Jericho claimed he was the victim of a carefully planned conspiracy to get the belt off of him. He at first blamed the WCW locker room, then added Dillon, Ted Turner, and finally in a vignette, he walked around Washington, D.C., with the sign "conspiracy victim" and accused President Bill Clinton of being one of the conspirators after being rejected from a meeting. Eventually, Malenko vacated the title. Jericho ended up defeating Malenko at The Great American Bash to win the vacant title after Malenko was disqualified after hitting Jericho with a chair. The next night, Malenko was suspended for his actions.

At Bash at the Beach, a returning Rey Mysterio Jr. defeated Jericho in a no disqualification match following interference by the still-suspended Malenko, though Jericho won the title back the following night on Nitro. Eventually, Jericho decisively lost the title to Guerrera at Road Wild in a match refereed by Malenko.

==== World Television Champion (1998–1999) ====
On August 10, 1998, Jericho defeated Stevie Ray (substituting for Booker T) to win the WCW World Television Championship. Soon afterward, Jericho repeatedly called out WCW World Heavyweight Champion Goldberg in an attempt to begin a feud with him, but never actually wrestled him. Jericho cites Eric Bischoff, Goldberg and Hulk Hogan's refusal to book Jericho in a pay-per-view squash match loss against Goldberg, which Jericho felt would be a big draw, as a major reason for leaving the company. On November 30, 1998, Jericho lost the World Television Championship to Konnan.

In early 1999, Jericho began a feud with Perry Saturn. The feud saw Jericho and Saturn instigating bizarre stipulation matches, such as at Souled Out, where Jericho defeated Saturn in a "loser must wear a dress" match. At SuperBrawl IX, Jericho and Saturn wrestled in a "dress" match which Jericho won. Saturn finally defeated Jericho at Uncensored in a dog collar match. Jericho alternated between WCW and a number of Japanese tours before he signed a contract with the World Wrestling Federation (WWF) on June 30. Jericho's final WCW match came during a Peoria, Illinois, house show July 21, where he and Eddie Guerrero lost to Billy Kidman and Rey Mysterio Jr. in a tag team match.

Fifteen years after Jericho's departure from WCW, his best known entrance music within the company, "One Crazed Anarchist", lent its name to the second single from his band Fozzy's 2014 album, Do You Wanna Start a War.

=== New Japan Pro-Wrestling (1997, 1998) ===
In January 1997, Jericho made his debut for New Japan Pro-Wrestling (NJPW), who had a working agreement with WCW, as Super Liger, the masked nemesis of Jyushin Thunder Liger. According to Jericho, Super Liger's first match against Koji Kanemoto at Wrestling World 1997 in the Tokyo Dome was so poorly received that the gimmick was dropped instantly. Jericho botched several moves in the match and complained he had difficulty seeing through the mask.

Jericho subsequently spent the next several months working for NJPW unmasked as Chris Jericho. He frequently teamed with fellow WCW wrestler Scotty Riggs and with his former opponent Kanemoto, facing wrestlers such as Liger, El Samurai, and Norio Honaga. In May 1997, he competed in the Best of the Super Juniors IV tournament, placing joint second in block B. His stint ended in September 1997 when he was recalled by WCW; his final match, held in the Nippon Budokan, saw him team with Kanemoto and Dr. Wagner Jr. in a loss to Liger, El Samurai, and Wild Pegasus.

On September 23, 1998, Jericho made a one night return to NJPW at that year's Big Wednesday show, teaming with Black Tiger to unsuccessfully challenge IWGP Junior Heavyweight Tag Team Champions Shinjiro Otani and Tatsuhito Takaiwa.

=== World Wrestling Federation/Entertainment (1999–2005) ===
==== Intercontinental Champion (1999–2001) ====
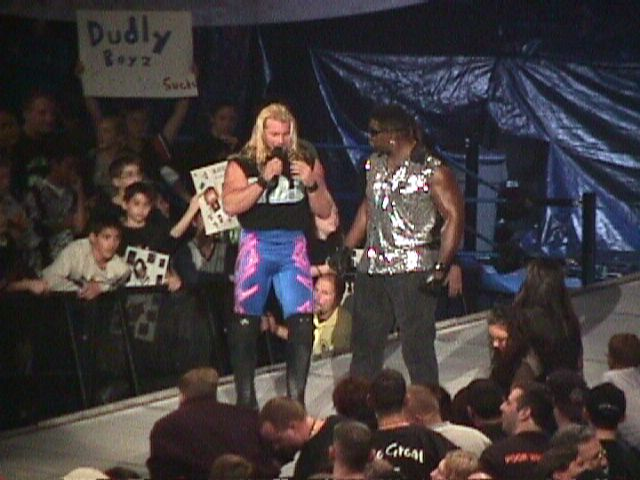
Jericho on SmackDown! in 1999 with Mr. Hughes, his enforcer during his rivalry with Ken Shamrock

In the weeks before Jericho's debut, a clock labeled "countdown to the new millennium" appeared on WWF programming. On the home video, Break Down the Walls, Jericho states he was inspired to do this as his entrance when he saw a similar clock in a post office and Vince McMahon approved its use as his introduction to the WWF. The clock finally ran out on the August 9 episode of Raw Is War in Chicago, Illinois while The Rock was in the ring cutting a promo on the Big Show. Jericho entered the arena and proclaimed "Raw Is Jericho" and that he had "come to save the World Wrestling Federation", referring to himself as "Y2J" (a play on the Y2K bug). The Rock proceeded to verbally mock Jericho for his interruption. Later that month, Jericho would interact with several superstars including in particular interrupting a promo that The Undertaker was involved in. Jericho made his in-ring debut as a heel on August 26, losing a match against Road Dogg by disqualification on the inaugural episode of SmackDown! after he performed a powerbomb on Road Dogg through a table.

Jericho's first long-term feud was with Chyna, for the WWF Intercontinental Championship. After losing to Chyna at Survivor Series on November 14, Jericho defeated her to win his first WWF Intercontinental Championship at Armageddon on December 12. This feud included a controversial decision during a rematch in which two separate referees declared each one of them the winner of a match for the title. As a result, Jericho and Chyna became co-champions, during which Jericho turned face. Jericho attained sole champion status at the Royal Rumble on January 23, 2000, by defeating Chyna and Hardcore Holly in a Triple Threat match.

Jericho lost the WWF Intercontinental title to then-European Champion Kurt Angle at No Way Out on February 27. Jericho competed in a Triple Threat match against Chris Benoit and Angle at WrestleMania 2000 on April 2 in a two-falls contest with both of Angle's titles at stake. Jericho won the European Championship by pinning Benoit, after Benoit pinned Jericho to win the WWF Intercontinental Championship.

On the April 17 episode of Raw is War, Jericho defeated Triple H to win the WWF Championship, but the decision was reversed that same night. On the May 4 episode of SmackDown!, Jericho defeated Benoit to win his third WWF Intercontinental Championship but lost the title back to Benoit four days later on Raw is War. Jericho's feud with Triple H ended at Fully Loaded on July 23, when Jericho lost in a Last Man Standing match.

At the Royal Rumble on January 21, 2001, Jericho defeated Chris Benoit in a ladder match to win the WWF Intercontinental Championship for the fourth time. At WrestleMania X-Seven on April 1, Jericho successfully defended his title in a match against William Regal, only to lose it four days later to Triple H. Jericho and Benoit would defeat Stone Cold Steve Austin and Triple H for their WWF Tag Team Championship on Raw. Jericho and Benoit defended their titles in the first fatal four-way Tables, Ladders and Chairs match on the May 24 episode of SmackDown!, where Benoit sustained a year-long injury after missing a diving headbutt through a table. Despite Benoit being carried out on a stretcher, he returned to the match to climb the ladder and retain the championship. Jericho and Benoit lost the titles one month later to The Dudley Boyz on the June 21 episode of SmackDown!.

==== Undisputed WWF Champion (2001–2002) ====
In the following months, Jericho became a major force in The Invasion storyline in which WCW and ECW joined forces to overtake the WWF. Jericho remained on the side of the WWF despite previously competing in WCW and ECW. He defeated The Rock at No Mercy on October 21 for the WCW Championship and they won the WWF Tag Team Championship from the Dudley Boyz soon after.

After they lost the titles to Test and Booker T on the November 1 episode of SmackDown!, The Rock defeated Jericho to regain the WCW Championship. At Survivor Series on November 18, Jericho turned heel by almost costing Team WWF the victory after he was eliminated in their Winner Take All matchup by once again attacking The Rock. Despite this, Team WWF won the match. At Vengeance on December 9, Jericho defeated both The Rock for the World Championship (formerly the WCW Championship) and Stone Cold Steve Austin for his first WWF Championship on the same night to become the first wrestler to hold both championships at the same time, which made him the first-ever Undisputed WWF Champion, as well as the fourth Grand Slam winner under the original format. He retained the title at the Royal Rumble on January 20, 2002, against The Rock and at No Way Out on February 17 against Austin. Jericho later lost the title to Triple H in the main event of WrestleMania X8 on March 17. Jericho was later drafted to the SmackDown! brand in the inaugural WWF draft lottery. After Jericho costed Triple H the title, they wrestled in a Hell in a Cell match at Judgment Day on May 19, where Triple H won.

==== Teaming and feuding with Christian (2002–2004) ====
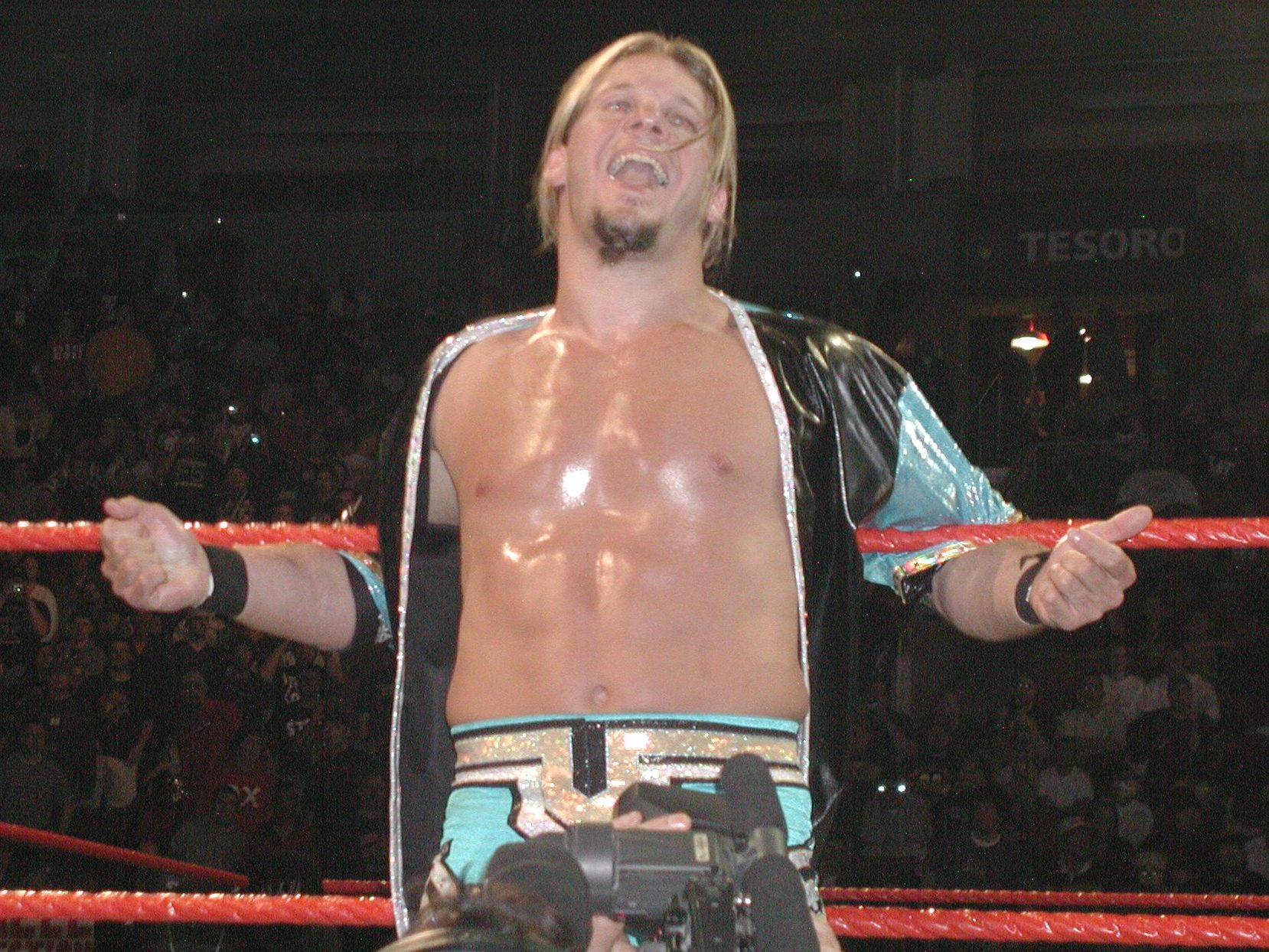
Jericho's ring entrance during Raw

After his feud with Cena ended, Jericho moved to the Raw brand on the July 29 episode of Raw, unwilling to work for SmackDown! General Manager Stephanie McMahon. Upon his arrival to the brand, he initiated a feud with Ric Flair, leading to a match at SummerSlam on August 25, which Jericho lost. On the September 16 episode of Raw, he won the WWE Intercontinental Championship for the fifth time from Rob Van Dam, before losing the title to Kane two weeks later on Raw. He then later formed a tag team with Christian, with whom he won the World Tag Team Championship by defeating Kane and The Hurricane on the October 14 episode of Raw. Christian and Jericho lost the titles to Booker T and Goldust in a fatal four-way elimination match, involving the teams of The Dudley Boyz, and William Regal and Lance Storm at Armageddon on December 15.

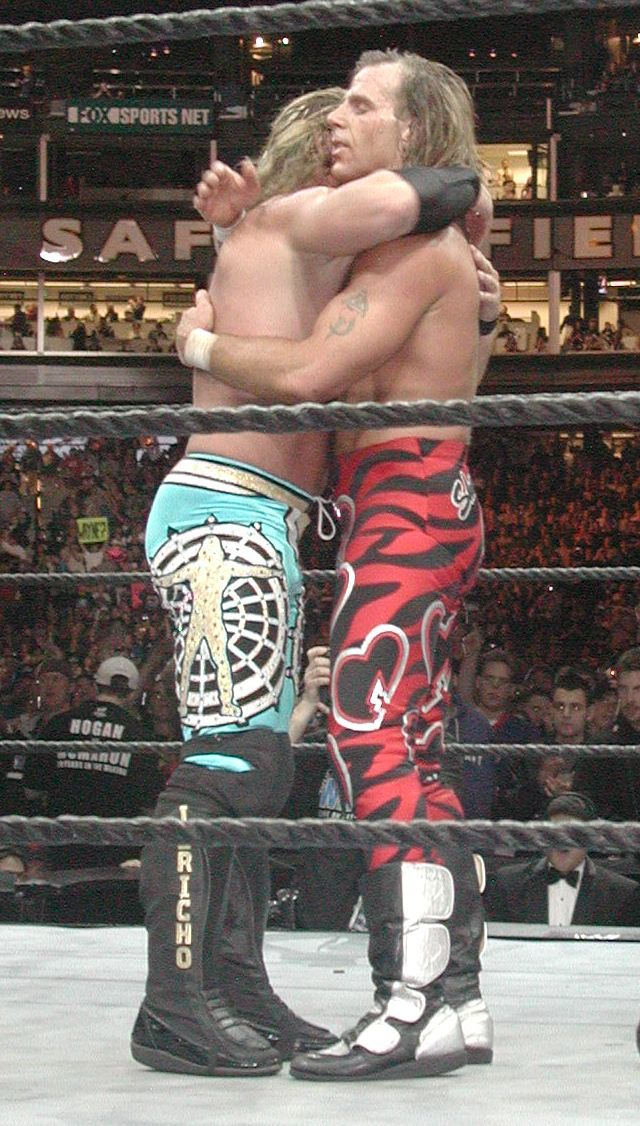
Jericho and Shawn Michaels after their match at WrestleMania XIX (2003)

On the January 13, 2003, episode of Raw, Jericho won an over-the-top-rope challenge against Kane, Rob Van Dam, and Batista to select his entry number for the Royal Rumble match on January 19. He chose number two in order to start the match with Shawn Michaels, who had challenged him to prove Jericho's claims that he was better than Michaels. After Michaels's entrance, Jericho entered as the second participant. Christian, in Jericho's attire, appeared while the real Jericho attacked Shawn from behind. He eliminated Michaels shortly afterward, but Michaels got his revenge later in the match by causing Test to eliminate Jericho. Jericho spent the most time of any other wrestler in that same Royal Rumble. Jericho simultaneously feuded with Test, Michaels, and Jeff Hardy, defeating Hardy at No Way Out on February 23. Jericho and Michaels fought again at WrestleMania XIX on March 30, which Michaels won. Jericho, however, attacked Michaels with a low blow after the match following an embrace.

After this match, Jericho entered a rivalry with Goldberg, which was fueled by Goldberg's refusal to fight Jericho in WCW. During Jericho's first episode of the Highlight Reel, an interview segment, where Goldberg was the guest, he complained that no one wanted Goldberg in WWE and continued to insult him in the following weeks. On the May 12 episode of Raw, a mystery assailant attempted to run over Goldberg with a limousine. A week later, Co-Raw General Manager, Stone Cold Steve Austin, interrogated several Raw superstars to find out who was driving the car. One of the interrogates was Lance Storm, who admitted that he was the assailant. Austin forced Storm into a match with Goldberg, who defeated Storm. After the match, Goldberg forced Storm to admit that Jericho was the superstar who conspired Storm into running him over. On the May 26 episode of Raw, Goldberg was once again a guest on the Highlight Reel. Jericho expressed jealousy towards Goldberg's success in WCW and felt that since joining WWE, he had achieved everything he had ever wanted in his career and all that was left was to defeat Goldberg and challenged him to a match. At Bad Blood on June 15, Goldberg settled the score with Jericho and defeated him.

On the October 27 episode of Raw, Jericho won his sixth WWE Intercontinental Championship when he defeated Rob Van Dam. He lost the title back to Van Dam immediately after in a steel cage match. Later in 2003, Jericho started a romance with Trish Stratus while his tag team partner Christian began one with Lita. This, however, turned out to be a bet over who could sleep with their respective paramour first, with a Canadian dollar at stake. Stratus overheard this and ended her relationship with Jericho, who seemingly felt bad for using Stratus. After he saved her from an attack by Kane, Stratus agreed that the two of them could just be "friends", thus turning Jericho face for the first time since 2001. After Christian put Stratus in the Walls of Jericho while competing against her in a match, Jericho sought revenge on Christian, which led to a match at WrestleMania XX on March 14, 2004. Christian defeated Jericho after Stratus ran down and "inadvertently" struck Jericho (thinking it was Christian) and Christian got the roll-up. After the match, Stratus turned on Jericho and revealed that she and Christian were a couple. This revelation led to a handicap match at Backlash on April 18 that Jericho won. Jericho won his record-breaking seventh WWE Intercontinental Championship at Unforgiven on September 12 in a ladder match against Christian, breaking the previous record held by Jeff Jarrett from 1999. Jericho's seventh reign was short lived, as he lost it at Taboo Tuesday on October 19 to Shelton Benjamin.

==== World championship pursuits and departure (2004–2005) ====
Jericho teamed up with Randy Orton, Chris Benoit, and Maven to take on Triple H, Batista, Edge, and Gene Snitsky at Survivor Series on November 14. The match stipulated that each member of the winning team would be the general manager of Raw over the next four weeks. Jericho's team won, and took turns as general manager. During Jericho's turn as general manager, the World Heavyweight Championship was vacated because a Triple Threat match for the title between Triple H, Benoit and Edge a week earlier ended in a draw. At New Year's Revolution on January 9, 2005, Jericho competed in the Elimination Chamber against Triple H, Chris Benoit, Batista, Randy Orton, and Edge for the vacant World Heavyweight Championship. Jericho began the match with Benoit and eliminated Edge, but was eliminated by Batista. Triple H went on to win. At WrestleMania 21 on April 3, Jericho participated in the first ever Money in the Bank ladder match. Jericho suggested the match concept, and he competed in the match against Shelton Benjamin, Chris Benoit, Kane, Christian, and Edge. Jericho lost the match when Edge claimed the briefcase.

At Backlash on May 1, Jericho challenged Shelton Benjamin for the WWE Intercontinental Championship, but lost the match. Jericho lost to Lance Storm at ECW One Night Stand on June 12. Jericho used his old "Lionheart" gimmick, instead of his more well known "Y2J" gimmick. Jericho lost the match after Jason and Justin Credible hit Jericho with a Singapore cane, which allowed Storm to win the match. The next night on Raw, Jericho turned heel by betraying WWE Champion John Cena after defeating Christian and Tyson Tomko in a tag team match. Jericho lost a Triple Threat match for the WWE Championship at Vengeance on June 26 which also involved Christian and Cena. The feud continued throughout the summer and Jericho lost to Cena in a WWE Championship match at SummerSlam on August 21.

The next night on the August 22 episode of Raw, Jericho faced Cena for the WWE Championship again in a rematch, this time in a "You're fired" match. Cena won again, and Jericho was fired by Raw General Manager Eric Bischoff. Jericho was carried out of the arena by security as Kurt Angle attacked Cena. Jericho's WWE contract expired on August 25.

=== Return to WWE (2007–2010) ===
==== Feud with Shawn Michaels (2007–2008) ====
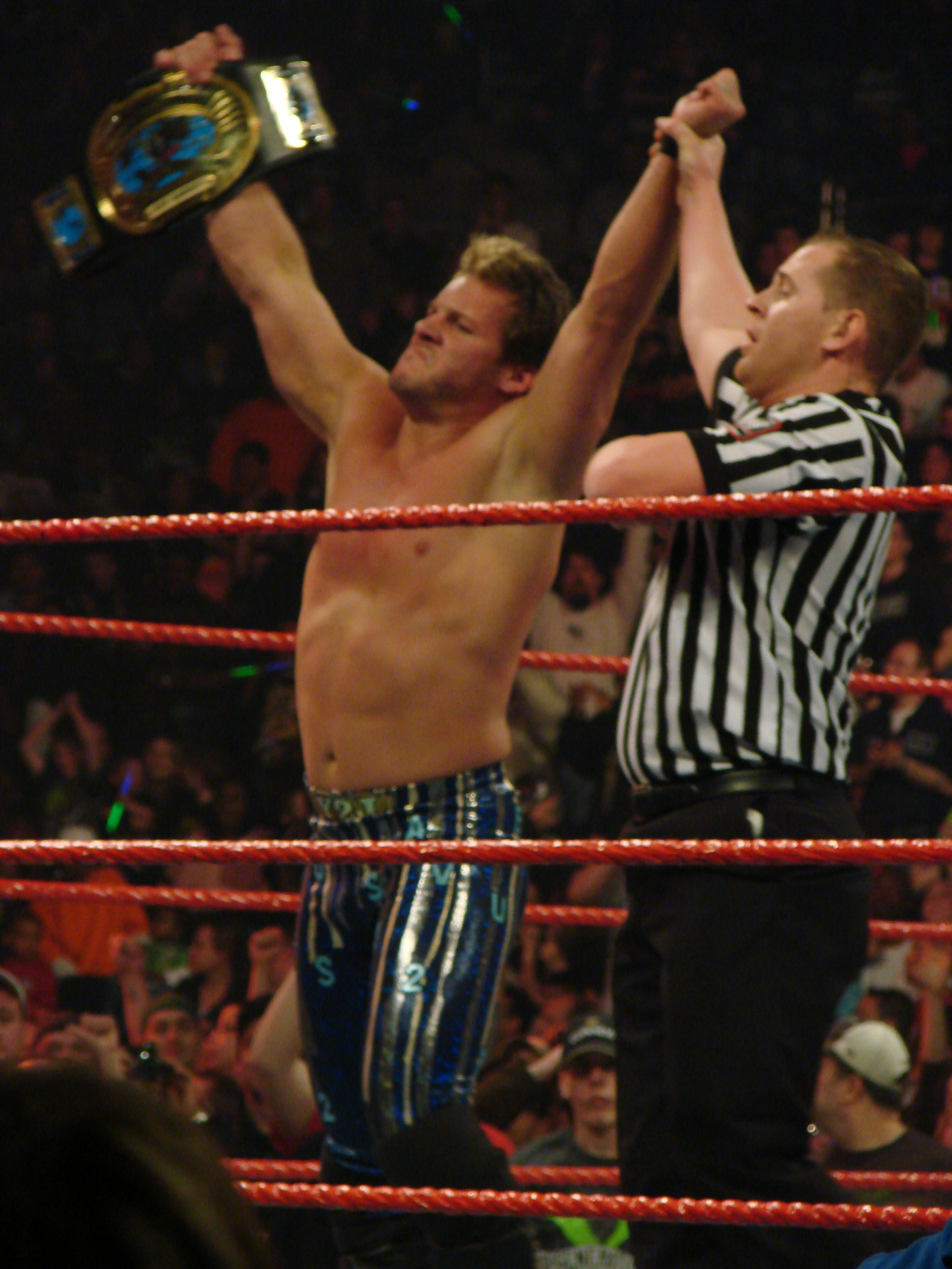
Jericho celebrates after winning his eighth WWE Intercontinental Championship in March 2008

After a two-year hiatus, WWE promoted Jericho's return starting on the September 24, 2007, episode of Raw with a viral marketing campaign using a series of 15-second cryptic binary code videos, similar to the matrix digital rain used in The Matrix series. The videos contained hidden messages and biblical links related to Jericho. Jericho made his return to WWE television as a face on the November 19, 2007, episode of Raw when he interrupted Randy Orton during Orton's orchestrated "passing of the torch" ceremony. Jericho stated his intentions to reclaim the WWE Championship in order to "save" WWE fans from Orton. On the November 26 episode of Raw, Jericho defeated Santino Marella and debuted a new finishing move called the Codebreaker. At Armageddon on December 16, he competed in a WWE Championship match against Orton, defeating him by disqualification when SmackDown!'s color commentator John "Bradshaw" Layfield (JBL) interfered in the match, but Orton retained the title. He began a feud with JBL and met him at the Royal Rumble on January 27, 2008. Jericho was disqualified after hitting JBL with a steel chair. On the March 10 episode of Raw, Jericho captured the WWE Intercontinental Championship for a record eighth time when he defeated Jeff Hardy.

In April, Jericho became involved in the ongoing feud between Shawn Michaels and Batista when he suggested that Michaels enjoyed retiring Ric Flair, causing Michaels to attack him. Jericho thus asked to be inserted into the match between Batista and Michaels at Backlash on April 27, but instead, he was appointed as the special guest referee. During the match at Backlash, Michaels feigned a knee injury so that Jericho would give him time to recover and lured Batista in for Sweet Chin Music for the win. After Backlash, Jericho accused Michaels of cheating, but Michaels continued to play up an injury. When Jericho was finally convinced and he apologized to Michaels for not believing him, Michaels then admitted to Jericho that he had faked his injury and he attacked Jericho with Sweet Chin Music. After losing to Michaels at Judgment Day on May 18, Jericho initiated a handshake after the match.

On the June 9 episode of Raw, during his segment The Highlight Reel, Jericho turned heel when he attacked Shawn Michaels hitting with the television. This began what was named by both Pro Wrestling Illustrated and the Wrestling Observer Newsletter the "Feud of the Year". At Night of Champions on June 29, Jericho lost the Intercontinental Championship to Kofi Kingston after a distraction by Michaels. In June, Jericho took on Lance Cade as a protégé.

==== World Heavyweight Champion (2008–2009) ====
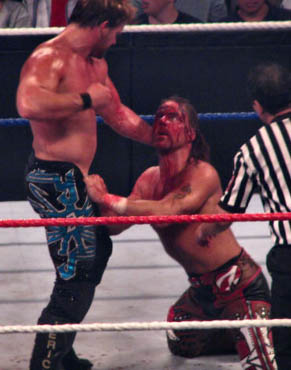
Jericho attacking the injured eye of Michaels at the 2008 Great American Bash. Their rivalry was named "Feud of the Year" by both Pro Wrestling Illustrated and the Wrestling Observer Newsletter.

Afterward, Jericho developed a suit-wearing persona inspired by Javier Bardem's character Anton Chigurh from the 2007 film No Country for Old Men and wrestler Nick Bockwinkel. Jericho and Michaels met at The Great American Bash on July 20, which Jericho won after attacking the cut on Michaels's eye. They fought in an unsanctioned match at Unforgiven on September 7, which Jericho lost by referee stoppage. Later that night, Jericho won the Championship Scramble match to win the World Heavyweight Championship. A final match between Jericho and Michaels was booked at No Mercy, where Jericho retained the title in a Ladder match. At Cyber Sunday on October 26, Jericho lost the title to Batista, but later won it back eight days later on November 3 on the 800th episode of Raw in a steel cage match. He lost the title again at Survivor Series on November 23 to the returning John Cena. On the December 8 episode of Raw, Jericho was awarded the Slammy Award for 2008 Superstar of the Year award. Six days later, he lost his rematch with John Cena for the World Heavyweight Championship at Armageddon on December 14.

Starting 2009, Jericho began a rivalry with veteran wrestlers Ric Flair, Ricky Steamboat, Jimmy Snuka and Roddy Piper, as well as actor Mickey Rourke. Jericho was originally arranged to face Rourke at WrestleMania 25 on April 5, but Rourke later pulled out of the event. Instead, Jericho defeated Piper, Snuka and Steamboat in a 3-on-1 elimination handicap match at WrestleMania, but was knocked out by Rourke after the match.

On the April 13 episode of Raw, Jericho was drafted to the SmackDown brand as part of the 2009 WWE draft. Jericho then faced Steamboat in a singles match at Backlash on April 26, where Jericho was victorious. In May, Jericho started a feud with Intercontinental Champion Rey Mysterio, leading to a match at Judgment Day on May 17, which Jericho lost. However, Jericho defeated Mysterio in a No Holds Barred Match at Extreme Rules on June 7 to win his ninth Intercontinental Championship, breaking his own record again. At The Bash on June 28, Jericho lost the Intercontinental Championship back to Mysterio in a mask vs. title match.

==== Jeri-Show and feud with Edge (2009–2010) ====
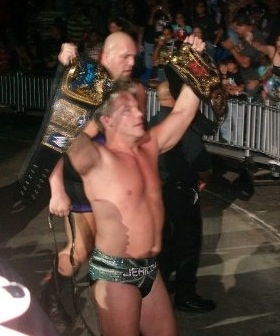
Jeri-Show as the Unified WWE Tag Team Champions

Later in the event, Jericho and his partner Edge won the Unified WWE Tag Team Championship as surprise entrants in a triple threat tag team match. As a result of this win, Jericho became the first wrestler to win every (original) Grand Slam eligible championship. Shortly thereafter Edge suffered an injury and Jericho revealed a clause in his contract to allow Edge to be replaced and Jericho's reign to continue uninterrupted. At Night of Champions on July 26, Jericho introduced Big Show as his new tag team partner, creating a team that would come to called Jeri-Show. The duo defeated Cody Rhodes and Ted DiBiase to retain the championship. Jeri-Show successfully defended the title against Cryme Tyme at SummerSlam on August 23, MVP and Mark Henry at Breaking Point on September 13 and Rey Mysterio and Batista at Hell in a Cell on October 4. At Survivor Series on November 22, both Jericho and Big Show took part in a triple threat match for the World Heavyweight Championship, but the Undertaker successfully retained the title. At TLC: Tables, Ladders & Chairs on December 13, Jeri-Show lost the tag titles to D-Generation X (DX) (Shawn Michaels and Triple H) in a Tables, Ladders and Chairs match. As a member of the SmackDown brand, Jericho could only appear on Raw as a champion and DX intentionally disqualified themselves in a rematch to force Jericho off the show. On the January 4, 2010, episode of Raw, DX defeated Jeri-Show to retain the championship once again, marking the end of Jeri-Show.

Jericho entered the 2010 Royal Rumble match on January 31, but was eliminated by the returning Edge, his former tag team partner, who went on to win the match. At Elimination Chamber on February 21, Jericho won the World Heavyweight Championship in an Elimination Chamber match, defeating The Undertaker, John Morrison, Rey Mysterio, CM Punk and R-Truth following interference from Shawn Michaels. The next night on Raw, Edge used his Royal Rumble win to challenge Jericho for the World Heavyweight Championship at WrestleMania XXVI on March 28. Jericho defeated Edge at WrestleMania to retain the title, but lost the championship to Jack Swagger on the following episode of SmackDown, who cashed in his Money in the Bank contract. Jericho then failed to regain the title from Swagger in a triple-threat match also involving Edge on the April 16 episode of SmackDown. Jericho and Edge continued their feud leading into Extreme Rules on April 25, where Jericho was defeated in a steel cage match.

Jericho was drafted to the Raw brand in the 2010 WWE draft. He formed a brief tag team with The Miz and unsuccessfully challenged The Hart Dynasty for the Unified WWE Tag Team Championship at Over the Limit on May 23. A month later, Jericho lost to Evan Bourne at Fatal 4-Way on June 20, but won a rematch during the following night on Raw, where he put his career on the line. On the July 19 episode of Raw, after being assaulted by The Nexus, Jericho teamed with rivals Edge, John Morrison, R-Truth, Daniel Bryan and Bret Hart in a team led by John Cena to face The Nexus at SummerSlam on August 15. Jericho and Cena bickered over leadership of the team, which led to him and Edge attacking Cena during the SummerSlam match that they won.

Jericho was punished for not showing solidarity against The Nexus, when he was removed from a Six-Pack Challenge for Sheamus's WWE Championship at Night of Champions on September 19. Although he re-earned his place in the match after defeating The Hart Dynasty in a handicap steel cage match, he was the first man eliminated from the match at Night of Champions. On the September 27 episode of Raw, Jericho faced Randy Orton who punted him in the head. This was used to explain Jericho's departure from WWE.

=== Second return to WWE (2011–2018, 2022) ===
==== Feud with CM Punk (2011–2012) ====
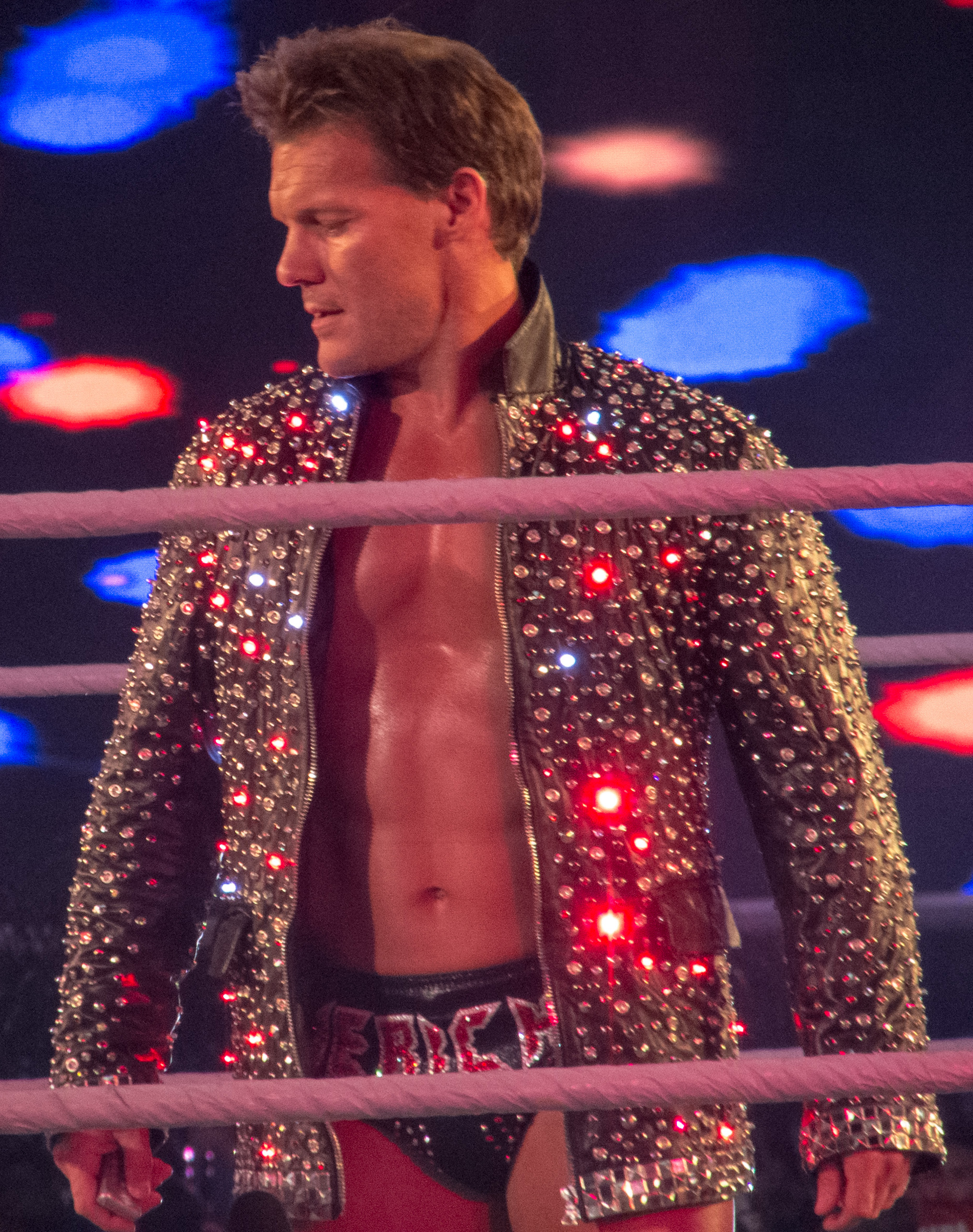
Jericho at WrestleMania XXVIII shortly before his match against CM Punk

Beginning in November 2011, WWE aired cryptic vignettes that promoted a wrestler's return, making his appearance on January 2, 2012, episode of Raw SuperShow. He participated in the Royal Rumble match at the Royal Rumble on January 29, where he was eliminated last by Sheamus. Leading to WrestleMania XXVIII on April 1, Jericho feuded with WWE Champion CM Punk over the moniker "the Best in the World". In a bid to psychologically unsettle Punk, Jericho revealed that Punk's father was an alcoholic and Punk's sister was a drug addict, which contradicted Punk's straight edge philosophy. Jericho faced Punk for the title at WrestleMania and Extreme Rules on April 29 in a Chicago Street Fight, but Punk won both matches.

==== Championship pursuits (2012–2013) ====
On May 24 at a WWE live event in Brazil, Jericho wrestled a match against CM Punk, during which Jericho kicked a Brazilian flag, causing local police to intervene and threaten Jericho with arrest. Jericho issued an apology to the audience, enabling the event to resume. The following day, WWE suspended Jericho for 30 days while apologizing to the people and government of Brazil. Jericho returned on the June 25 episode of Raw SuperShow, and his absence was explained by a European tour with his band Fozzy which happened to coincide with his suspension. After losing the WWE Championship Money in the Bank ladder match on July 15, Jericho feuded with the newly crowned Mr. Money in the Bank, Dolph Ziggler, turning face for the first time since 2008. Despite Jericho defeating Ziggler at SummerSlam on August 19, he lost to Ziggler the following night on Raw, and, as a result, Ziggler retained his Money in the Bank contract and Jericho was terminated from WWE. This was used to write him off so he could tour with Fozzy for the remainder of the year.

On January 27, 2013, Jericho returned after a five-month hiatus entering the Royal Rumble match as the second entrant. Jericho lasted over 47 minutes before being eliminated by Dolph Ziggler. On the March 18 episode of Raw, The Miz and Jericho faced Wade Barrett for the Intercontinental Championship, but Barrett retained his title. Jericho asked Vince McMahon to face Barrett and win his 10th Intercontinental title at WrestleMania 29 on April 7, but he was booked in a feud with Fandango, losing to Fandango at WrestleMania, but Jericho won a rematch at Extreme Rules on May 19. He then faced the returning CM Punk at Payback on June 16, where he was defeated. Jericho then began feuding with Ryback, which led to a singles match on July 14 at Money in the Bank, where Ryback emerged victorious. On the July 19 episode of SmackDown, Jericho unsuccessfully challenged Curtis Axel for the WWE Intercontinental Championship and was afterwards attacked by Ryback. This was done to write Jericho off television as he was taking a temporary hiatus to tour with Fozzy for the remainder of the year and possibly January and February.

In a November interview for WWE.com, Jericho said that he would not be a full-time wrestler due to his musical and acting ventures.

==== Various sporadic feuds (2014–2016) ====
After an eleven-month hiatus, Jericho returned on the June 30, 2014, episode of Raw and attacked The Miz, who had also returned minutes earlier, before being attacked in turn by The Wyatt Family. Across the following month Jericho fought three matches against Bray Wyatt, winning the first at Battleground before losing a second match at SummerSlam and a third on Raw three weeks later. Jericho then feuded with Randy Orton, who defeated him at Night of Champions on September 21. After exclusively wrestling at live events through October and November, Jericho returned to Raw on December 15, where he was attacked by Brock Lesnar during his match with Paul Heyman.

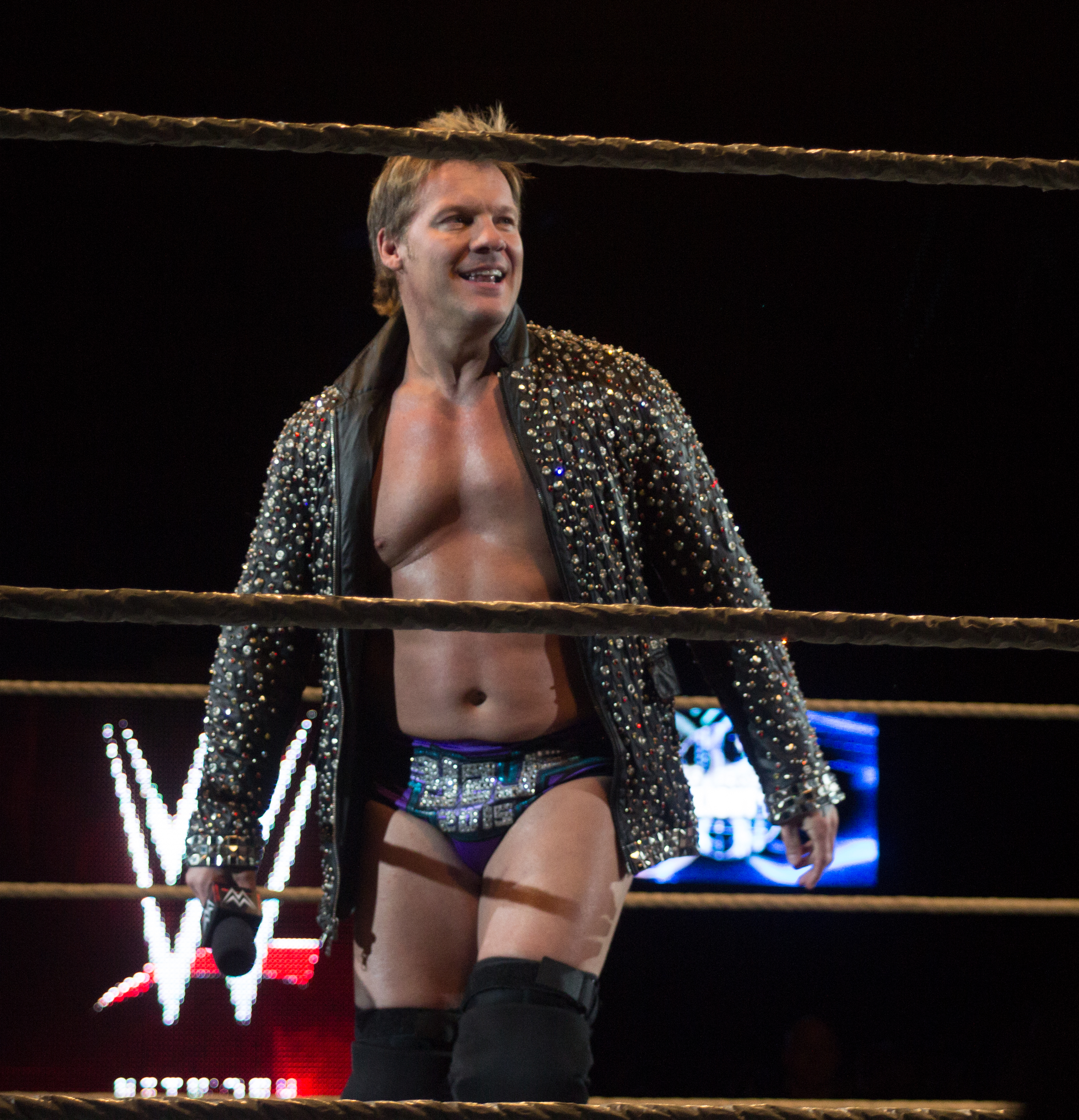
Jericho at a WWE event in 2015

In January 2015, Jericho said that he signed an exclusive WWE contract, under which he would compete at 16 house shows only. He later signed a similar contract once the former expired and competed at house shows throughout the rest of the year. In May, Jericho was one of the hosts of Tough Enough's sixth season. Jericho also hosted two Live! With Chris Jericho specials on the WWE Network during the year. Jericho returned to television again The Beast in the East on July 4, defeating Neville. At Night of Champions on September 20, Jericho lost to the Wyatt Family alongside Roman Reigns and Dean Ambrose, and lost a title match against Intercontinental Champion Kevin Owens at Live from Madison Square Garden on October 3.

At the Royal Rumble on January 24, 2016, Jericho participated in the Royal Rumble match as the sixth entrant, eliminated by Dean Ambrose, and lost a match to AJ Styles on Raw the following night. Jericho and Styles fought two more matches, with Jericho winning the second and Styles the third, before the two formed the tag team Y2AJ on February 22. The team soon separated, as Jericho attacked Styles on March 7 after the team lost a match. Jericho declared that he was sick of the fans chanting for Styles instead of him and turned heel. Jericho would then defeat Styles in a match at WrestleMania 32 on April 3, and be pinned by him in a four-way match on Raw the following night.

Then, he started a feud with Dean Ambrose, being defeated at Payback and Extreme Rules in a Asylum match.

==== The List of Jericho (2016–2017) ====
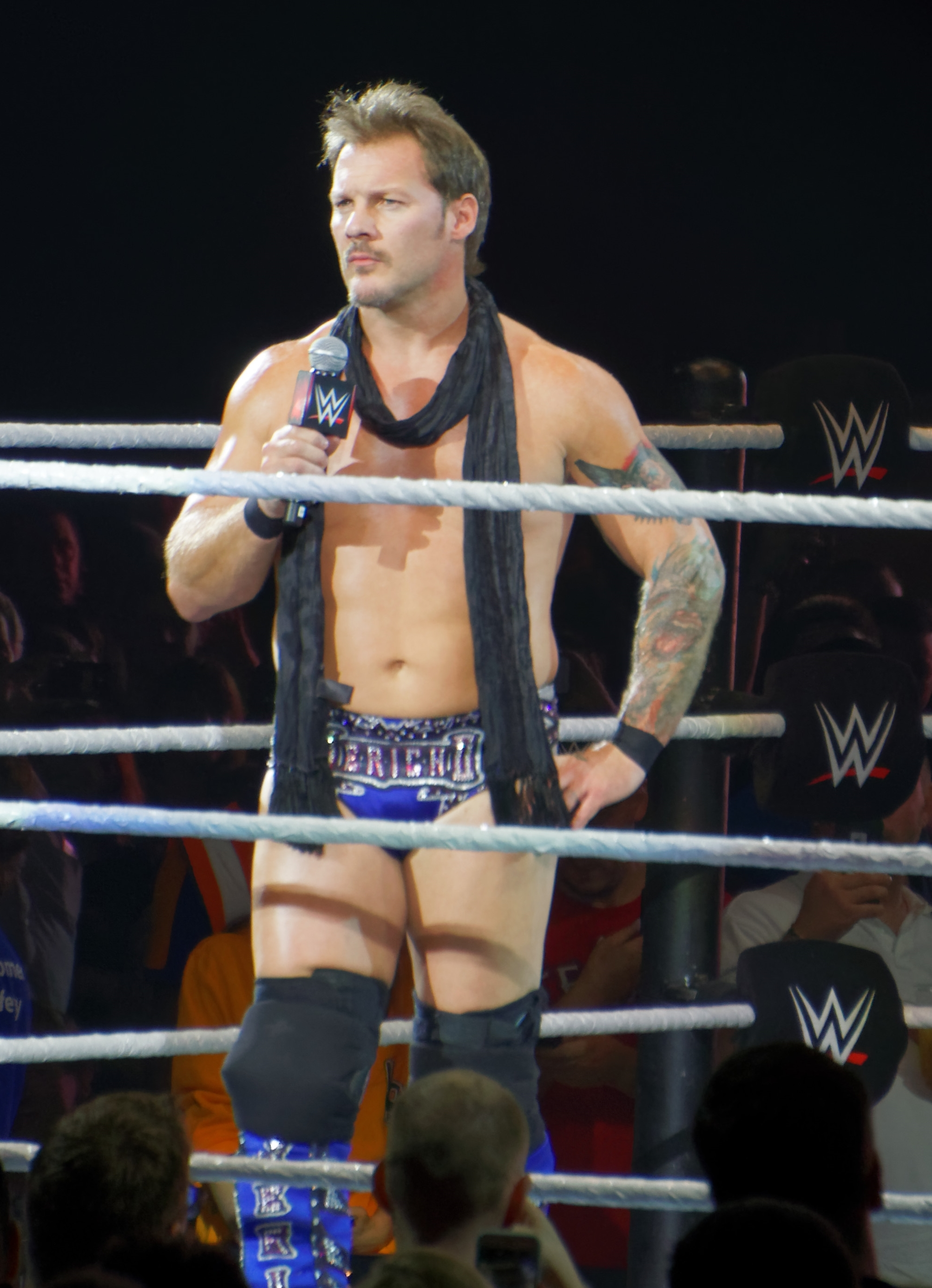
Jericho at a WWE event in September 2016

At SummerSlam, Jericho and Kevin Owens defeated Enzo and Cass. Both wrestlers began an alliance, allowing Owens to win the WWE Universal Championship.

Jericho also started a new character, where he began a list called "The List of Jericho", where he wrote down the name of the person that bothered him and why. If someone annoyed Jericho, he would ask "you know what happens?" before shouting "you just made the list!" and writing the person's name down. The List of Jericho soon became incredibly popular with the fans, with many critics describing Jericho and his list as "easily one of the best moments of Raw's broadcast". During Owens' reign, Jericho assisted him to retain the title in matches at Clash of Champions on September 25, Hell in a Cell on October 30, and the November 21 episode of Raw. Jericho also defeated Roman Reigns in a handicap match also involving Owens on the January 9, 2017, episode of Raw to win the WWE United States Championship, becoming Grand Slam winner under the current format. Due to interfering multiple times in Owens's matches, Jericho was suspended above the ring in a shark proof cage during Reigns's rematch at the Royal Rumble pay-per-view event on January 29. Owens nonetheless retained the championship after Braun Strowman, taking advantage of the added no disqualification stipulation, interfered. Also at the Royal Rumble, Jericho entered as the second entrant in the Royal Rumble match, lasting over an hour (thus breaking the record with a cumulative time of over five hours) and being the third to last before being eliminated by Reigns.

In February, a feud started between Jericho and Owens after Jericho accepted a Universal Championship challenge from Goldberg on Owens's behalf. On the February 13 episode of Raw, Jericho held a "Festival of Friendship" for Owens, who attacked Jericho, ending their alliance. Jericho returned at Fastlane on March 5, distracting Owens during his match with Goldberg and causing Owens to lose the Universal Championship, turning face again in the process. This led to a match between Jericho and Owens at WrestleMania 33 on April 2, where Jericho lost the title. At Payback on April 30, Jericho defeated Owens to regain the title and moved to the SmackDown brand, but lost it back to him two nights later on SmackDown Live. Following the match, Owens attacked Jericho, who was carried out on a stretcher. Thus, Jericho was written off television so he could fulfill his commitments to tour with and promote his new album with Fozzy. Jericho made a surprise return at a house show in Singapore on June 28, where he lost to Hideo Itami.

==== Final matches and departure (2017–2018) ====
On the July 25 episode of SmackDown Live, Jericho participated in a triple threat match against Owens and Styles for the title in which Jericho was pinned by Styles. On January 22, 2018, during the 25th Anniversary of Raw, Jericho appeared backstage in a segment with Elias, putting him on The List of Jericho. At the Greatest Royal Rumble on April 27, Jericho was the final entrant in the 50-man Royal Rumble match, eliminating Shelton Benjamin before being eliminated by the eventual winner Braun Strowman. This event marked Jericho's final in-ring appearance with WWE to date. In September 2019, during an interview for the Mature Audiences Mayhem Podcast, Jericho explained that an incident occurred that made him finalize a decision to leave WWE. Even though Jericho was with the WWE for 15 years, at WrestleMania 33 in 2017, the match between Jericho and Kevin Owens (an established feud) was marked as second place on the WrestleMania match card for the United States Championship. The decision, made by Vince McMahon, prompted Jericho to seek work elsewhere.

==== Cameo (2022) ====
On the June 27, 2022, episode of Raw, Jericho made an appearance via video message to congratulate John Cena on his career.

=== Return to NJPW (2017–2020) ===
On November 5, 2017, Jericho returned to NJPW in a pre-taped vignette, challenging Kenny Omega to a match at Wrestle Kingdom 12 in Tokyo Dome for Omega's IWGP United States Heavyweight Championship. The match, dubbed "Alpha vs. Omega", was Jericho's first match outside of WWE since he left WCW in July 1999. Journalist Dave Meltzer wrote that Jericho's WWE contract had expired and that he was a "free agent". NJPW also referred to Jericho as a free agent. In contrast, the Tokyo Sports newspaper described an anonymous NJPW official saying that Jericho is still under contract with WWE, and that WWE chairman Vince McMahon had given him permission to wrestle this match in NJPW. Jericho was defeated by Omega in the Wrestle Kingdom match, which was the first of Jericho's career to receive a five-star rating from Dave Meltzer of the Wrestling Observer Newsletter.

At Wrestling Dontaku 2018, Jericho ambushed and assaulted Tetsuya Naito.

Jericho's next feud was against Tetsuya Naito, defeating him at Dominion 6.9 in Osaka-jo Hall to win the IWGP Intercontinental Championship. After retaining the title against Evil at Power Struggle, he lost it against Naito at Wrestle Kingdom 13.

Jericho's last matches with NJPW were at Dominion 6.9 in Osaka-jo Hall, being defeated by Kazuchika Okada for the IWGP Heavyweight Championship, and at Wrestle Kingdom 14, where he defeated Hiroshi Tanahashi.

=== Return to the independent circuit (2018–2024) ===
On September 1, 2018, Jericho (disguised as Penta El Zero) appeared at the All In show promoted by Cody and The Young Bucks, where he attacked Kenny Omega following Omega's victory over Penta to promote his upcoming Rock 'N' Wrestling Rager at Sea cruise.

In October 2018, Jericho organized his annual Chris Jericho's Rock 'N' Wrestling Rager at Sea, a series of professional wrestling matches originating from Jericho's cruise ship, which embarked from Miami, Florida and featured wrestlers from Ring of Honor. The series would also continue with wrestlers from All Elite Wrestling after Jericho signed with the promotion in 2019.

On May 3, 2019, Jericho appeared at a Southern Honor Wrestling event, where he was attacked by Kenny Omega.

On January 8, 2023, Jericho made his debut for Pro Wrestling Guerrilla (PWG), as part of PWG Battle of Los Angeles 2023 night 2, where he teamed with the Jericho Appreciation Society (Daniel Garcia, Angelo Parker, Matt Menard and Sammy Guevara) to defeat the team of Jonathan Gresham, Kevin Blackwood, Michael Oku, Player Uno, and SB Kento in a ten-man tag team match. On August 26, 2023, Jericho made his surprise debut for Revolution Pro Wrestling (RevPro) at RevPro 11th Anniversary Show by attacking Will Ospreay ahead of their match at All In. On December 3, 2023, Jericho made a surprise appearance at Vietnam Pro Wrestling (VPW).

On December 14, 2024, Jericho made his debut for Game Changer Wrestling (GCW) at Highest in the Room 3, where he attacked Effy and Matt Cardona.

=== All Elite Wrestling / Ring of Honor (2019–present) ===
==== The Inner Circle (2019–2021) ====
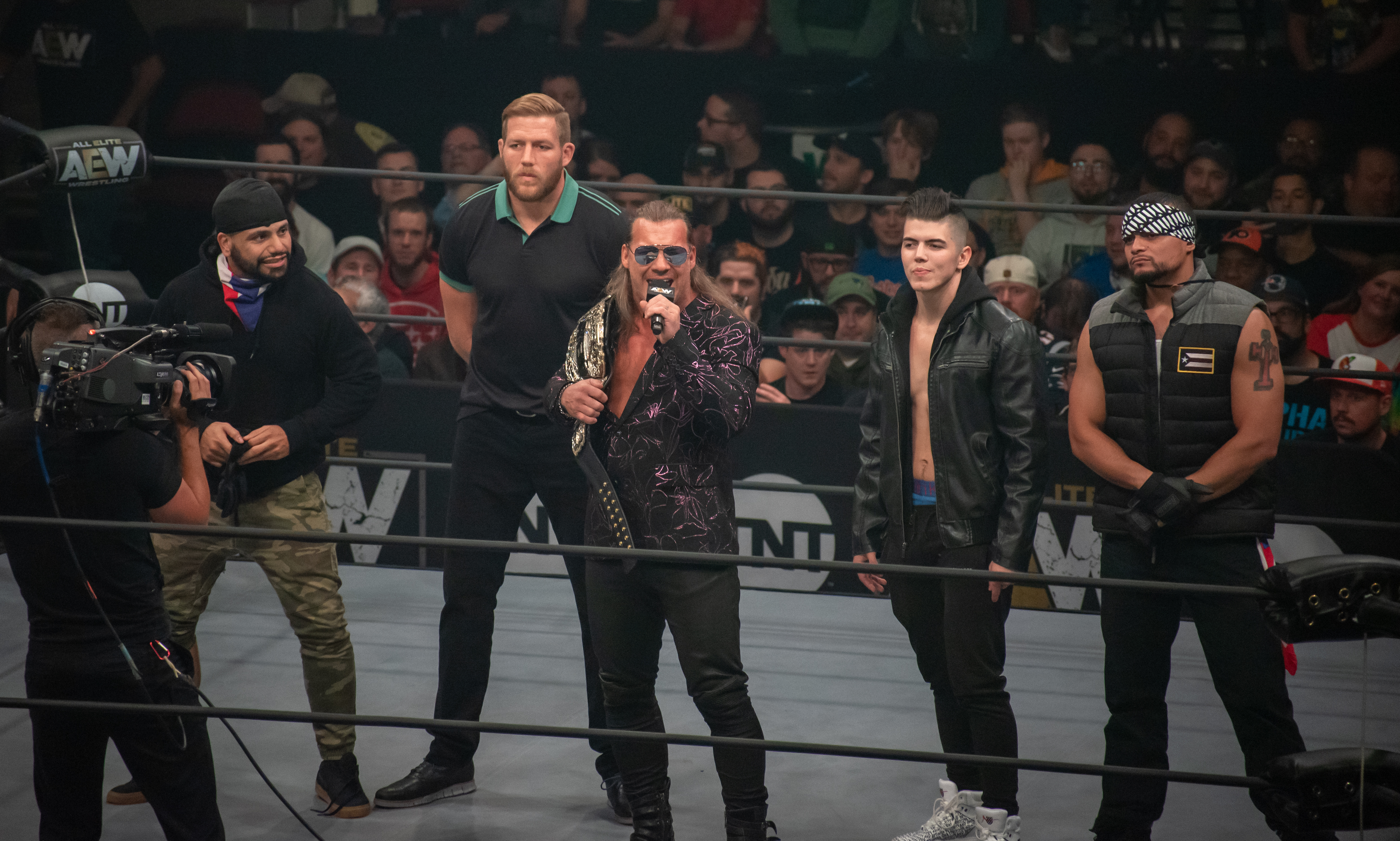
Jericho delivering a message to the crowd during AEW Dynamite in front of the newly formed Inner Circle faction in October 2019

On January 8, 2019, Jericho made a surprise appearance at a media event organized by the upstart All Elite Wrestling (AEW) promotion. Shortly afterwards, Jericho was filmed signing a full-time performers three-year contract with AEW. Jericho defeated Kenny Omega at the promotion's inaugural event Double or Nothing on May 25, and went on to defeat Adam Page at All Out on August 31 to become the inaugural AEW World Champion. On the premiere episode of Dynamite on October 2, Jericho allied himself with Sammy Guevara, Jake Hager, Santana and Ortiz, creating a stable that would be known as The Inner Circle. Jericho would make successful title defences against Darby Allin on the October 16 episode of Dynamite, Cody at Full Gear on November 9, and Scorpio Sky on the Thanksgiving Eve special episode on November 27. In December, Jericho started a feud with Jon Moxley where he unsuccessfully tried to convince Moxley to join the group. At Revolution on February 29, 2020, Jericho lost the world championship to Moxley, ending his reign at 182 days.

After losing the championship, Jericho and The Inner Circle began a feud with The Elite (Adam Page, Cody, Kenny Omega and The Young Bucks). At Double or Nothing on May 23, The Inner Circle were defeated by Page, Omega, The Young Bucks and Matt Hardy in a Stadium Stampede match. Jericho next began a rivalry with Orange Cassidy, with Jericho defeating him on the Fyter Fest episode of Dynamite on July 8, but losing a rematch on the August 12 episode of Dynamite. The two faced once again at All Out on September 5, in a Mimosa Mayhem match, which Jericho lost.

Beginning in October, Jericho began a feud with MJF, who requested to join the Inner Circle, despite disapproval from the rest of the group. Jericho and MJF wrestled in a match at the Full Gear event on November 7, which MJF won, thus allowing him to join the Inner Circle. On the Beach Break episode of Dynamite on February 3, 2021, Jericho and MJF won a tag team battle royal to become the number one contenders for the AEW World Tag Team Championship at the Revolution event on March 7 against The Young Bucks, which they were unsuccessful in winning.

On the March 10 episode of Dynamite, MJF betrayed and left The Inner Circle after revealing he had been secretly plotting against them and building his own stable, The Pinnacle—consisting of Wardlow, Shawn Spears and FTR (Cash Wheeler and Dax Harwood)—turning the Inner Circle face. On the Blood and Guts episode of Dynamite on May 5, The Inner Circle lost to The Pinnacle in the inaugural Blood and Guts match. However, in the main event of Double or Nothing on May 30, The Inner Circle defeated The Pinnacle in a Stadium Stampede match, after Sammy Guevara pinned Shawn Spears. Jericho then began pursuing another match with MJF, who stated that he would first have to defeat a gauntlet of opponents selected by MJF, in a series dubbed the "Labors of Jericho". Jericho would defeat each of MJF's handpicked opponents (Shawn Spears, Nick Gage, Juventud Guerrera and Wardlow) and faced MJF in the final match on the August 18 episode of Dynamite, but he was defeated. Jericho demanded one more match, stipulating that if he lost, he would retire from in-ring competition, which MJF accepted. At All Out on September 5, Jericho defeated MJF to maintain his career and end their feud.

Following All Out, The Inner Circle started a rivalry with Men of the Year (Ethan Page and Scorpio Sky), and their ally, mixed martial arts (MMA) coach Dan Lambert. Lambert also brought in members of his MMA team American Top Team (ATT) to oppose The Inner Circle, including former UFC Heavyweight Champions Andrei Arlovski and Junior dos Santos. At the Full Gear event on November 13, The Inner Circle defeated Men of the Year and ATT in a Minneapolis Street Fight.

==== Jericho Appreciation Society (2022–2023) ====
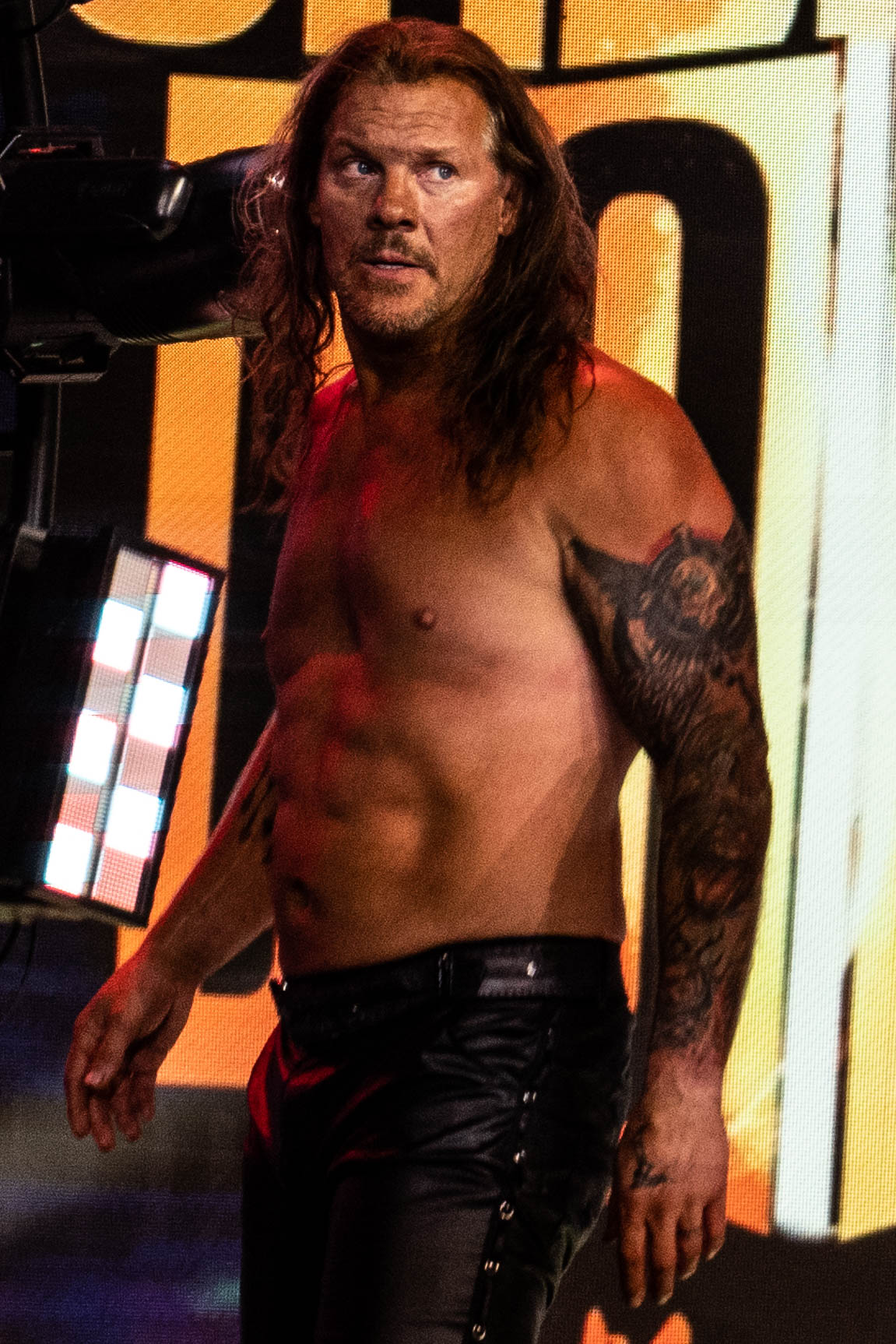
Jericho during AEW x NJPW Forbidden Door 2022

At Revolution on March 6, 2022, Jericho was defeated by Eddie Kingston. After the match, Jericho refused to shake Kingston's hand. On the March 9 episode of Dynamite, Jericho turned heel by attacking Kingston and the team of Santana and Ortiz with a help of 2.0 and Daniel Garcia, ending the Inner Circle. At Double or Nothing on May 29, The Jericho Appreciation Society defeated the Blackpool Combat Club (Jon Moxley and Bryan Danielson), Eddie Kingston, Santana and Ortiz in an Anarchy in the Arena match. At Blood & Guts on June 29, The Jericho Appreciation Society were defeated by Blackpool Combat Club (Jon Moxley, Wheeler Yuta and Claudio Castagnoli), Eddie Kingston, Santana and Ortiz in a Blood and Guts match. At Fyter Fest on July 20, Jericho defeated Kingston in a Barbed Wire Deathmatch to end their feud. The Jericho Appreciation Society and Blackpool Combat Club feud continued through 2022 and saw the return of Jericho's Lionheart persona in matches with Moxley and Danielson. At Dynamite: Grand Slam on September 21, Jericho defeated Claudio Castagnoli to win the ROH World Championship for the first time in his career. On October 18, it was announced that Jericho had signed a contract extension with AEW through December 2025. With this extension, Jericho received new roles as a coach and creative consultant, in addition to performing for AEW as an in-ring wrestler. During his reign as ROH World Champion, Jericho referred to himself as "The Ocho" (as it marked his eighth overall world championship) and successfully defended the title against many former ROH champions, such as Dalton Castle, whom he defeated at Title Tuesday, Colt Cabana, Tomohiro Ishii, whom he defeated on the Thanksgiving Eve episode of Dynamite on November 23, and Bandido. At Final Battle on December 10, Jericho lost the ROH World Championship back to Castagnoli, ending his reign at 80 days.

Going into 2023, Jericho began a feud with Ricky Starks. The feud culminated at Revolution on March 5, where Jericho was defeated by Starks. After losing to Starks, Jericho began a feud with Adam Cole, which culminated at Double or Nothing on May 28, where Jericho was defeated by Cole in an unsanctioned match. On the August 9 episode of Dynamite, all members except Sammy Guevera, of the Jericho Appreciation Society walked out on Jericho due to his association with Don Callis, effectively disbanding the stable.

==== Feud with The Don Callis Family (2023–2024) ====
Jericho was able to maintain his alliance with Guevara, reforming their tag team known as "Le Sex Gods". At All In on August 27, Jericho was defeated by Will Ospreay. After the match, Jericho shoved Guevara away. On the Dynamite edition of Grand Slam, Jericho defeated Guevara, but when Jericho tried to show respect, Guevara hit him with a low blow and joined The Don Callis Family, turning Jericho face in the process. On the Rampage edition of Grand Slam, Jericho tried to attack The Don Callis Family, only to be outnumbered and saved by Kenny Omega. Jericho and Omega then formed a tag team known as "The Golden Jets" to take out The Don Callis Family. At WrestleDream on October 1, The Golden Jets with Kota Ibushi were defeated by The Don Callis Family (Ospreay, Guevera, and Konosuke Takeshita). At Full Gear on November 18, The Golden Jets defeated The Young Bucks to earn a shot at the AEW World Tag Team Championships. In December, Omega was diagnosed with diverticulitis and would be forced to take time off, effectively ending The Golden Jets. On the December 27 edition of Dynamite, Jericho came to Guevara's aid from a Don Callis Family attack and reunited Le Sex Gods. At Worlds End on December 30, Le Sex Gods teamed with Sting and Darby Allin to defeat The Don Callis Family (Takeshita and Powerhouse Hobbs), Ricky Starks, and Big Bill.

On January 13, 2024, at Battle of the Belts IX, Le Sex Gods unsuccessfully challenged Starks and Bill for the AEW World Tag Team Championships due to interference from Hobbs and Takeshita. On the February 7 episode of Dynamite, Jericho was defeated by Takeshita, ending a near six-month feud with The Don Callis Family.

==== The Learning Tree (2024–2025) ====
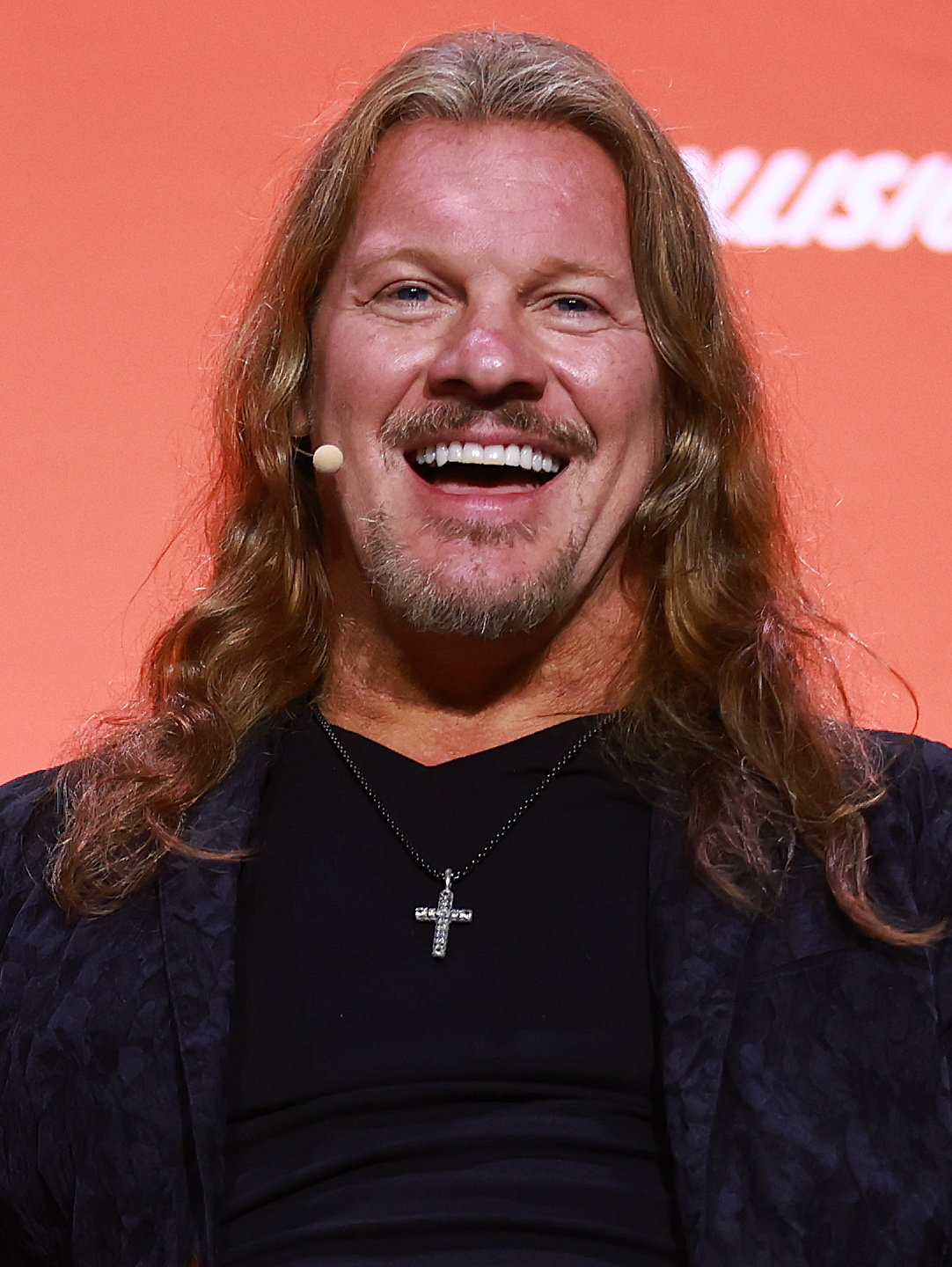
Jericho in 2024

Starting in March 2024, Jericho attempted to form a mentor-student relationship with Hook, however, Jericho was rebuffed, ultimately leading to a match between the two at Dynasty on April 21 which saw Jericho win the FTW Championship. On the April 24 episode of Dynamite, Jericho renamed the FTW Championship to the "For The World Championship", dubbed himself "The Learning Tree", where he portrayed a delusional mentor and sarcastically saying he needs his "TV time", which was a reference to the online criticism of Jericho being constantly featured on AEW programming, turning heel once again. On the May 1 episode of Dynamite, Jericho successfully defended the FTW Championship against Katsuyori Shibata, with the assistance of Big Bill, whom Jericho then agreed to add to his learning tree. On May 26 at Double or Nothing, Jericho successfully defended the title against Hook and Katsuyori Shibata with the help of Bryan Keith. On June 30 at Forbidden Door Jericho teamed with Jeff Cobb and Big Bill to take on Samoa Joe, Katsuyori Shibata and Hook but was unsuccessful. On August 25, Jericho faced Hook at All In but lost the title, ending his reign at 127 days. On October 12 at WrestleDream, Jericho challenged Mark Briscoe for the ROH World Championship, in a losing effort. On the October 23 episode of Dynamite, Jericho defeated Mark Briscoe in a Ladder War (with Big Bill giving him a boost on his shoulders) to win the ROH World Championship for the second time, marking his ninth overall world title, and with that he gave himself the nickname of "The Nueve" (nine in Spanish). On November 27 at Thanksgiving Eve Dynamite, Jericho successfully defended his title against Tomohiro Ishii. On December 20 at Final Battle, Jericho successfully defended his title against Matt Cardona. After the match, Jericho attempted to attack Cardona but was chased off by a returning Bandido.

On the February 22, 2025, episode of Collision, Jericho successfully defended his title against Bandido. On March 9 at Revolution Zero Hour, Jericho was scheduled to defend his title against Bandido's brother Gravity, but the match never started due to The Learning Tree attacking Gravity and unmasking him. On April 6 at Dynasty, Jericho lost the title to Bandido in a Title vs. Mask match. On the following episode of Dynamite, The Learning Tree would disband as Jericho would blame losing the ROH World Championship on both Big Bill and Bryan Keith, before saying he would "leave" until Bill and Keith make a change.

==== Various feuds (2026–present) ====
After nearly a year off television and speculation over his status in AEW, Jericho returned as a face on the April 1, 2026, episode of Dynamite in his hometown of Winnipeg, Manitoba. He subsequently adopted the truncated ring name Jericho, although he continued to be referred to by his full ring name on occasion. On April 12 at Dynasty, Jericho was defeated by Ricochet in his first match in over a year. At Double or Nothing on May 24, Jericho's team defeated Ricochet's team in a Stadium Stampede. On the following episode of Dynamite, Jericho defeated Ricohet in a Dynasty rematch with the stipulation of everyone being banned from ringside, ending their feud. After the match, Jericho was attacked by Tommaso Ciampa. On July 8 at Dynamite: Beach Break, Jericho was defeated by Ciampa but defeated him in a No Holds Barred match at Redemption on July 26 as Painmaker, ending their feud. On August 30 at All In, Jericho unsuccessufully competed in the Casino Gauntlet match for an AEW World Championship opportunity. Following All In, Jericho entered a feud with Nick Wayne, trading victories against each other over the following weeks.On October 17 at WrestleDream, Jericho was defeated by Wayne in their third match to end the feud.

== Legacy ==
Known for his over-the-top, rock star persona, Jericho has been described by multiple industry commentators as one of the greatest professional wrestlers of all time. (Note: Jericho has been named as one of the greatest professional wrestlers of all time by journalists for ProWrestling.net, the Pro Wrestling Torch, ESPN, the Miami Herald, TV Guide, Complex and Heavy, as well as by Chris Van Vliet and Peter Rosenberg.) Journalist Chris Van Vliet noted that his name is "always thrown around as the GOAT [greatest of all time], or at least one of the GOATs", with Van Vliet himself asserting that Jericho is "if not the best, certainly one of the best". Todd Martin of the Pro Wrestling Torch remarked, to agreement from editor Wade Keller, that Jericho is "one of the great wrestlers of all time" and in "a lofty category", while likening his oeuvre to those of WWE Hall of Famers Randy Savage, Ricky Steamboat, Ted DiBiase and Dory Funk Jr. Praised for his ability to continually evolve his gimmick, Jericho was dubbed by KC Joyner of ESPN as "wrestling's David Bowie".

Various outlets have included Jericho in lists of the greatest wrestlers ever. (Note: Jericho has appeared in "greatest wrestlers" lists by outlets such as Sports Illustrated, IGN, Muscle & Fitness, Metro New York, and InsideSTL.) Baltimore Sun reporter Kevin Eck, who has also served as editor of WCW Magazine and a WWE producer, featured Jericho in his "Top 10 favorite wrestlers of all time" and "Top 10 all-around performers"—the former piece noting that Jericho is "regarded as one of the very best talkers in the business". Keisha Hatchett in TV Guide wrote that Jericho "owns the mic with cerebral insults" and is set apart from peers by "his charismatic presence, which is highlighted by a laundry list of unforgettable catchphrases". He was voted by Wrestling Observer Newsletter (WON) readers as "Best on Interviews" for the 2000s decade, coinciding with his 2010 induction into the WON Hall of Fame. Fans also named Jericho the greatest WWE Intercontinental Champion of all time in a 2013 WWE poll, affording him a landslide 63% victory over the other four contenders (Mr. Perfect, The Honky Tonk Man, Rick Rude and Pat Patterson).

Chris Jericho's feud with Shawn Michaels and their series of matches, particularly their ladder match at No Mercy in 2008 received critical acclaim. Wrestling Observer Newsletter named their feud the "feud of the year" and the ladder match the "match of the year". Jericho was listed in the top 20 of both Sports Illustrated and IGN’s list of the greatest pro wrestlers of all time. Kerry Miller of Bleacher Report wrote "Jericho was one of the best trash talkers the WWE has ever had."

A number of Jericho's industry colleagues have hailed him as one of the greatest wrestlers in history. (Note: Industry colleagues who have named Jericho as one of the greatest performers of all time include: Kurt Angle, Stone Cold Steve Austin, Triple H, Jon Moxley, Kenny Omega, Dolph Ziggler, Matt Striker, Shad Gaspard, James Ellsworth and Eric Bischoff. He also appeared in WWE's 2011 DVD Top 50 Superstars of All Time, as voted by the company's roster.) Kurt Angle labelled him the single greatest performer of all time. Stone Cold Steve Austin lauded his consistently "dynamic" promos and in-ring work, while arguing that he should be considered among the 10 best ever. Kenny Omega asserted that Jericho "has a legit argument for being the best of all time", based on his ability to achieve success and notoriety across numerous territories. Jon Moxley said, "Jericho is really making a case for being the greatest of all time... he's doing it again, he's doing something completely new, and breaking new barriers still here in 2020." Matt Striker pointed to Jericho's "magnanimous" nature as a contributing factor to his status as an all-time great; his willingness to impart knowledge was commended by James Ellsworth, who described Jericho as an "outstanding human being" and a childhood favorite. Kevin Owens stated that "Jericho was always someone I looked up to", while The Miz affirmed that he was part of a generation of young wrestlers who sought to "emulate" Jericho.

WWE declared Jericho a "marquee draw" with a "reputation as one of the best ever". As of 2026, he is one of the ten most prolific pay-per-view performers in company history.

After Jericho signed with All Elite Wrestling, it was said his role was similar to Terry Funk in ECW, as an experienced veteran bringing credibility to a younger promotion. Jericho was credited as one of the key attractions of AEW's weekly television broadcasts, leading to him adopting the nickname "The Demo God" due to many of the segments he appeared in being some of the highest viewed in the key demographics. He was voted as the Best Box Office Draw by readers of the Wrestling Observer Newsletter in 2019.

On March 15, 2023, prior to an AEW Dynamite broadcast from Winnipeg, Jericho was bestowed with a Queen Elizabeth II Platinum Jubilee Medal by Premier of Manitoba Heather Stefanson, and it was announced that a portion of Winnipeg's Wordsworth Way where he lived would be renamed "Chris Jericho Way".

== Music career ==
Chris Jericho
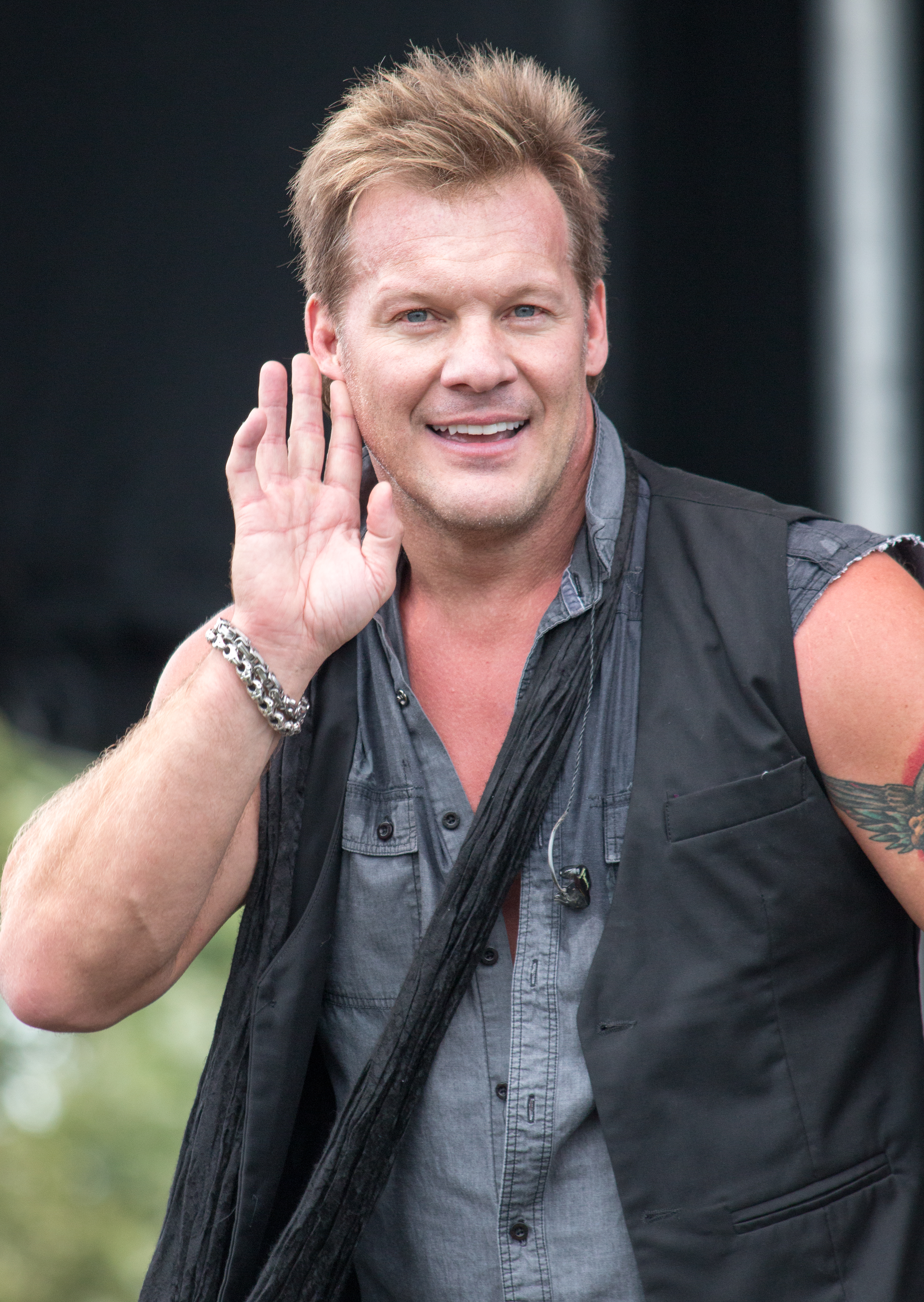
- Jericho live with Fozzy in August 2015

Background information
- Also known as: Moongoose McQueen
- Born: Christopher Keith Irvine; November 9, 1970 (age 56); Manhasset, New York, U.S.
- Genres: Heavy metal, hard rock
- Occupation: Singer
- Years active: 1999–present
- Member of: Fozzy, Kuarantine
- Website: chrisjericho.com fozzyrock.com

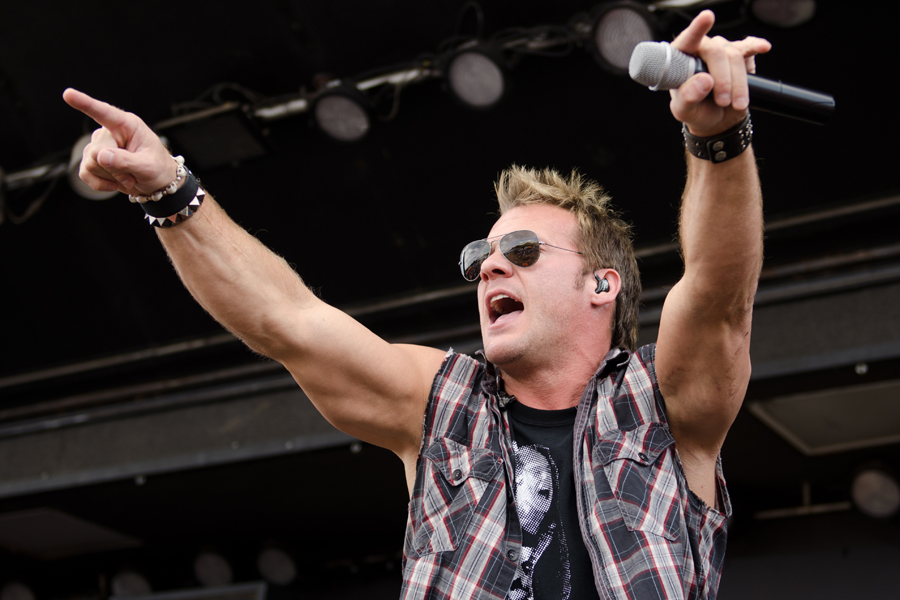
Jericho performing in December 2012

"Enemy" by Fozzy (2005)
Sample from "Enemy" by Fozzy, with Jericho on vocals

Jericho is the lead singer for the heavy metal band Fozzy. Starting with their eponymous debut album in 2000, Fozzy have released eight studio albums; Happenstance, All That Remains, Chasing the Grail, Sin and Bones, Do You Wanna Start a War, Judas, Boombox, and one live album, Remains Alive.

Jericho also serves as one of the song writers for Fozzy some of his lyrical themes touch upon relationships, personal struggle, self-belief and anthems. Jericho has also stated he often starts with a song title rather than a complete theme stating "I have a list of song titles when it's time to write lyrics" "I'll go back and look through what I have."

In 2005, Jericho performed vocals on a cover of "The Evil That Men Do" on the Iron Maiden tribute album, Numbers from the Beast. He made a guest appearance on Dream Theater's album, Systematic Chaos on the song "Repentance", as one of several musical guests recorded apologizing to important people in their lives for wrongdoings in the past.

In the mid-1990s, Jericho wrote a monthly column for Metal Edge magazine focused on the heavy metal scene. The column ran for about a year. He started his own weekly XM Satellite Radio show in March 2005 called The Rock of Jericho, which aired Sunday nights on XM 41 The Boneyard.

Jericho has cited the following bands as a musical influence: The Beatles, Iron Maiden, Judas Priest, Ozzy Osbourne, Pantera, and Metallica. He has also credited 1980s pop acts like Billy Ocean, Madonna, and Duran Duran as influences as well.

=== Discography ===
Albums with Fozzy

- Fozzy (2000)
- Happenstance (2002)
- All That Remains (2005)
- Chasing the Grail (2010)
- Sin and Bones (2012)
- Do You Wanna Start a War (2014)
- Judas (2017)
- Boombox (2022)

Live albums

- Remains Alive (2009)

As guest

- Don't You Wish You Were Me? - WWE Originals (2004)
- King of the Night Time World - Spin the Bottle: An All-Star Tribute to Kiss (2004) * With Rich Ward, Mike Inez, Fred Coury
- Bullet for My Valentine – Temper Temper – Dead to the World (2013)
- Devin Townsend – Dark Matters (2014)
- Michael Sweet – I'm Not Your Suicide – Anybody Else (2014)

== Other endeavors ==
Chris Jericho

YouTube information
- Channel: Chris Jericho
- Years active: 2017–present
- Genre: Entertainment
- Subscribers: 244 thousand
- Views: 26.98 million
- Last updated: December 26, 2025

=== Film, theater, comedy, and writing ===
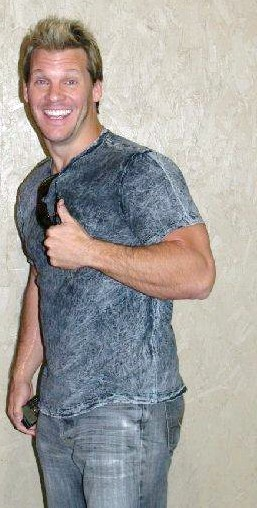
Jericho in 2007

In 2000, a WWE produced VHS tape documenting Jericho's career titled Break Down the Walls was released. He later received two three disc sets profiling matches and interviews.

On June 24, 2006, Jericho premiered in his first Sci-Fi Channel movie Android Apocalypse alongside Scott Bairstow and Joey Lawrence.

Jericho debuted as a stage actor in a comedy play Opening Night, which premiered at the Toronto Centre for the Arts during July 20–22, 2006, in Toronto. During his stay in Toronto, Jericho hosted the sketch comedy show Sunday Night Live with sketch troupe The Sketchersons at The Brunswick House.

Jericho was also the first wrestler attached and interviewed for the wrestling documentary, Bloodstained Memoirs. The interview was recorded in the UK during a Fozzy tour in 2006.

Jericho wrote his autobiography, A Lion's Tale: Around the World in Spandex, which was released on October 25, 2007, and became a New York Times bestseller. It covers Jericho's life and wrestling career up to his debut in the WWE. Jericho's second autobiography, Undisputed: How to Become the World Champion in 1,372 Easy Steps, was released on February 16, 2011, and covers his wrestling career since his WWE debut. On October 14, 2014, Jericho's third book, The Best In The World...At What I Have No Idea, was released. It covers some untold stories of the "Save Us" era, his Fozzy career, and his multiple returns from 2011 to 2013. Jericho's fourth book, No Is a Four-Letter Word: How I Failed Spelling but Succeeded in Life, was released on August 29, 2017, and details twenty valuable lessons Jericho learned throughout his career as a wrestler and musician.

Jericho appeared in the 2009 film Albino Farm. In the film MacGruber, released May 21, 2010, he briefly appeared as Frank Korver, a former military teammate of the eponymous Green Beret, Navy Seal, and Army Ranger.

Jericho hosted the Revolver Golden Gods Music Awards three times in 2010, 2011 and 2013. He also hosted the Metal Hammer Golden Gods Awards in 2012 and 2017.

Jericho released a comedy web series on October 29, 2013, that is loosely based on his life entitled But I'm Chris Jericho! Jericho plays a former wrestler, struggling to make it big as an actor. A second season was produced in 2017 by CBC and distributed over CBC's television app and CBC.ca.

In 2016, Jericho starred in the documentary film Nine Legends alongside Mike Tyson and other wrestlers.

In August 2018, Jericho was confirmed to star in the film KillRoy Was Here.

On March 14, 2019, filmmaker Kevin Smith cast Jericho as a KKK Grand Wizard in Jay and Silent Bob Reboot.

=== Television ===
Jericho was a contributor to the VH1 pop culture shows Best Week Ever, I Love the '80s, and VH1's top 100 artists.

Jericho also hosted the five-part, five-hour VH1 special 100 Most Shocking Music Moments, an update of the original special 100 Most Shocking Moments in Rock N' Roll first hosted by Mark McGrath of Sugar Ray.

On July 12, 2006, he made an appearance on G4's Attack of the Show!; he made a second appearance on August 21, 2009. In May 2006, Jericho appeared on VH1's 40 Greatest Metal Songs and Heavy: The Story of Metal as a commentator.

He was one of eight celebrities in the 2006 Fox Television singing reality show Celebrity Duets, produced by Simon Cowell, and was the first contestant eliminated. Jericho worked at a McDonald's to show off his skills while prepping for the show.

Jericho hosted his own reality show in 2008 titled Redemption Song, in which 11 women tried their hand at getting into the music scene. It was shown on Fuse TV.

He guest starred as Billy "The Body Bag" Cobb in "Xero Control", an episode of the Disney XD 2009 original series Aaron Stone.

He hosted VH1's 100 Most Shocking Music Moments, which began airing in December 2009. In June 2010, Jericho was named the host of the ABC prime-time game show Downfall.

On March 1, 2011, Chris Jericho was named one of the contestants on the 2011 lineup of Dancing with the Stars. His partner was two-time champion Cheryl Burke. This led to a wave of publicity, including an interview with Jay Leno. On April 26, Jericho was the fifth contestant eliminated on the show.

On May 5, Jericho made his third appearance as a guest on Attack of the Show! where he depicted Thor. On January 17, 2012, Jericho made his fourth appearance on Attack of the Show! in a segment called "Twitter Twister" where he portrayed a character called "The Twistercutioner" and read tweets as instructions for a game of Twister between Kevin and Candace.

On February 26, 2013, Jericho began hosting a robot combat competition program on SyFy titled Robot Combat League the series ended on April 23, 2015.

In 2022, Jericho competed in season eight of The Masked Singer as "Bride" which resembles a dragon-like Kaiju in a wedding dress. After besting George Foreman as "Venus Fly Trap" and George Clinton as "Gopher" on "Hall of Fame Night", he was eliminated on "Comedy Roast Night" alongside Adam Carolla as "Avocado".

=== Talk Is Jericho podcast ===
In December 2013, Jericho began hosting his own podcast, Talk Is Jericho. Episodes usually include a loosely scripted monologue before an interview, typically with a wrestler, rock musician or paranormal expert. The show originally appeared on PodcastOne, before moving to the WestwoodOne network in 2018. Notable guests on the show include Bruce Dickinson from Iron Maiden, Lemmy from Motörhead, Paul Stanley from Kiss, Zak Bagans from Ghost Adventures, pornographic actress Asa Akira, writer/director Kevin Smith and many former and current wrestlers.

In April 2015, Jericho hosted his own video podcast on the WWE Network, Live! with Chris Jericho, with John Cena as his first guest, followed by Stephanie McMahon as his guest later that same month.

Once he signed with AEW, he was no longer allowed to have WWE performers as guests on the podcast.

=== Web ===
On August 10, 2019, Jericho launched his own dirtsheet website called WebIsJericho.com. The website is dedicated to the memory of Axl Rotten.

=== Cruises ===
In 2017, Jericho launched Chris Jericho's Rock 'N' Wrestling Rager at Sea, a cruise "combining the worlds of rock and wrestling with a once in a lifetime amazing vacation experience". The cruise featured live band performances, artist-hosted activities and a Sea of Honor Tournament with over a dozen Ring of Honor wrestlers competing. Guests had the opportunity to get up close and personal with Chris and his closest wrestling, comedian, and musician friends including Jim Ross, Diamond Dallas Page and Jim Breuer, among others. The cruise sailed October 27–31, 2018, from Miami to Nassau, Bahamas. Further cruises followed in 2020, 2021, 2023, 2024 and 2025 with a seventh journey planned for 2026.

== Personal life ==
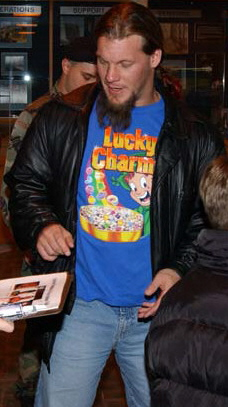
Jericho in 2003

Irvine married Jessica Lockhart on July 30, 2000. They reside in Odessa, Florida, with their three children: son Ash Edward Irvine (born 2003) and identical twin daughters Sierra Loretta "SiSi" Irvine and Cheyenne Lee "Chey" Irvine (born 2006). All three have been guests on his podcast, Talk Is Jericho, with his son discussing fish and his daughters discussing literature. Irvine owns three cats. He is a supporter of the Winnipeg Jets. In October 2020, Irvine reportedly donated $3,000 to Donald Trump's presidential re-election campaign.

Irvine is a Christian. He has a tattoo of his wife's name on his ring finger. He has the letter F, representing Fozzy, on the back of his hand. Since 2012, he has gradually gotten a sleeve over his left arm. His tattoos include: the artwork of Fozzy's album Sin and Bones, a Jack-o'-lantern (Avenged Sevenfold vocalist M. Shadows, who collaborated with Fozzy on the track "Sandpaper" from Sin and Bones, also got a matching tattoo), a lake monster, and himself from his WWF debut in 1999.

On January 27, 2010, Irvine and fellow wrestler Gregory Helms were arrested in Fort Mitchell, Kentucky after leaving a bar. A police report stated that Helms punched Irvine and the other passengers in the cab. Fellow wrestlers Christian and CM Punk later bailed them out.

Since January 2012, Irvine (along with former NFL Quarterback Tim Tebow, former NFL player Derrick Brooks, and former Atlanta Braves player Chipper Jones) has been the co-owner of a sports training facility in Tampa, a franchise site of D1 Sports Training and Therapy.

Irvine is a fan of Japanese convenience store chain Lawson, which Irvine would frequently shop at when he wrestled in Japan in the 1990s. Irvine still visits Lawson whenever he returns to Japan, whether to wrestle or if he is touring with Fozzy.

=== Charity work ===
Jericho has made numerous philanthropic and charitable efforts. Alongside WWE superstars Kevin Owens and Tyler Breeze, he donated $2,500 to help victims of the Alberta forest fires. He also donated $1,500 to help Brian Knobbs with his knee surgery. In 2014 Jericho recorded a YouTube only exclusive podcast with a fan named Daniel House who was terminally ill. He also set up a fundraiser to help the fan and let him tour with his band Fozzy. In 2016 Jericho donated $3,000 to help pay the medical expenses for Rico Constantino's.

In 2019 Jericho donated $5,000 to former professional wrestler Kamala to help him pay for his housing expenses as he was getting evicted from his home. The following year he donated another $5,000 to Kamala's family following his death to help pay for his funeral. That same year he also donated another $5,000 to the family of Shad Gaspard following his death.

In 2021 Jericho donated $2,500 to help Steve "Mongo" McMichael cover medical expenses after he was diagnosed with ALS. He also donated $2,500 to the GoFundMe campaign set up for the family of Mohammad Anwar who was killed in a carjacking incident. In 2023 the wife of former professional Umaga revealed that Jericho donated $5,000 to his family following his death in 2009.

In 2023, after Buffalo Bills player Damar Hamlin's on-field collapse during a game against the Cincinnati Bengals, Jericho donated $10,000 to Hamlin's charity; originally a $5,000 donation, he later donated another $5,000 after misspelling his own name in the original donation. In 2025 Jericho donated $5,000 to help cover fellow wrestler Sabu's funeral arrangements. Later that same year he contributed $2,500 to a fundraiser for independent wrestler Syko Stu after he faced serious assault and injuries during a match.

== Filmography ==
Year	Title	Role	Notes
2006	Android Apocalypse	TeeDee	
2009	Albino Farm	Levi	
2009	Bloodstained Memoirs	Himself	Documentary
2010	MacGruber	Frank Korver	
2015	Sharknado 3: Oh Hell No!	Bruce, the ride attendant	Television film
2016	Nine Legends	Himself	
2019	Jay and Silent Bob Reboot	KKK Grand Wizard	
2020	In Search of Darkness: Part II	Himself	Documentary
2021	I'm Too Old For This Sh*t	Producer	Documentary
2022	KillRoy Was Here	The Gator Chaser	
2022	Terrifier 2	Adam Burke	
2024	Dark Match	Prophet	
2024	Terrifier 3	Adam Burke	

== Television ==
Year	Title	Role	Notes
2004	Headbangers Ball	Himself	
2008	Redemption Song	Himself	Host
2009	Aaron Stone	Billy Cobb	Season 1, episode 11
2009	Z Rock	Himself	Season 2, episode 6
2010	Downfall	Himself	Host
2011	Dancing with the Stars	Himself	Season 12 contestant
2011	Cubed	Himself	
2013	Robot Combat League	Himself	Host
2013; 2016; 2019	Talking Dead	Himself	3 episodes
2013; 2017	But I'm Chris Jericho!	Himself	Lead
2014	@midnight	Himself	Episode 47
2015	Nothing to Report	Chance Blackstreet	Web series
2015	WWE Tough Enough	Himself	Host
2016	The Eric Andre Show	Himself	Season 4, episode 8
2016	Hollywood Game Night	Himself	Contestant (Season 4, episode 9)
2016	Whose Line Is It Anyway?	Himself	Season 12, episode 5
2016	The Thundermans	Gary	Season 3, episode 19
2017	Tanked	Himself	Season 12, episode 1
2017	Hot Ones	Himself	Season 4, episode 15
2017	The Legend of... with Chris Jericho	Himself	Host
2018	Rock and Roll Road Trip with Sammy Hagar	Himself	Season 3, episode 5
2018	Drop the Mic	Himself	Season 2, episode 9
2019	Engraved on a Nation	Himself	Season 2, episode 5
2019	America's Got Talent	Himself	Season 14, episode 23
2019	Lights Out with David Spade	Himself	Panelist (Season 1, episode 37)
2020–present	Dark Side of the Ring	Himself	Narrator and occasional interviewee (seasons 2–present, 65 episodes)
2022	Fast Foodies	Himself	Season 2, episode 2
2022	The Masked Singer	Himself	Season 8 contestant
2026	Tracker	Virgil Dean	Episode:"Breakaway"
2026	Margo's Got Money Troubles	Himself	Miniseries, 1 episode
2026	Dexter: Resurrection	Midnight Mangler	Episode: "Risky Business"

== Video games appearances ==
=== World Championship Wrestling ===
Year	Title	Notes
1998	WCW Nitro	Video game debut
1998	WCW/nWo Revenge	
1999	WCW/nWo Thunder	
1999	WCW Mayhem	

=== World Wrestling Federation / World Wrestling Entertainment / WWE ===
Year	Title	Notes
1999	WWF WrestleMania 2000	
2000	WWF SmackDown!	
2000	WWF Royal Rumble	
2000	WWF No Mercy	
2000	WWF SmackDown! 2: Know Your Role	Cover athlete
2001	WWF With Authority!	
2001	WWF Betrayal	
2001	WWF Road to WrestleMania	
2001	WWF SmackDown! Just Bring It	
2002	WWF Raw	
2002	WWE WrestleMania X8	
2002	WWE Road to WrestleMania X8	
2002	WWE SmackDown! Shut Your Mouth	Cover athlete (NTSC version)
2003	WWE Crush Hour	
2003	WWE WrestleMania XIX	
2003	WWE Raw 2	
2003	WWE SmackDown! Here Comes the Pain	
2004	WWE Day of Reckoning	
2004	WWE Survivor Series	Cover athlete
2004	WWE SmackDown! vs. Raw	
2005	WWE WrestleMania 21	
2005	WWE Aftershock	
2005	WWE Day of Reckoning 2	
2005	WWE SmackDown! vs. Raw 2006	
2008	WWE SmackDown vs. Raw 2009	
2009	WWE SmackDown vs. Raw 2010	
2010	WWE SmackDown vs. Raw 2011	
2011	WWE All Stars	
2012	WWE '13	
2013	WWE 2K14	
2014	WWE 2K15	Motion capture
2014	WWE SuperCard	
2015	WWE 2K16	Motion capture
2016	WWE 2K17	Motion capture
2017	WWE Champions	
2017	WWE Tap Mania	
2017	WWE 2K18	Motion capture
2017	WWE Mayhem	
2018	WWE 2K19	Motion capture

=== All Elite Wrestling ===
Year	Title	Notes
2021	AEW Elite GM	
2021	AEW Casino: Double or Nothing	
2023	AEW Fight Forever	Cover athlete

== Championships and accomplishments ==
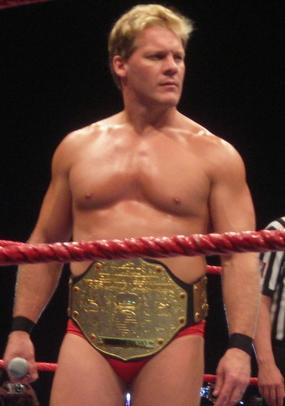
Jericho is a six-time world champion in WWE—in all six of those reigns the Big Gold Belt (shown here) was used as the championship belt or part of it in the case of his Undisputed title reign.

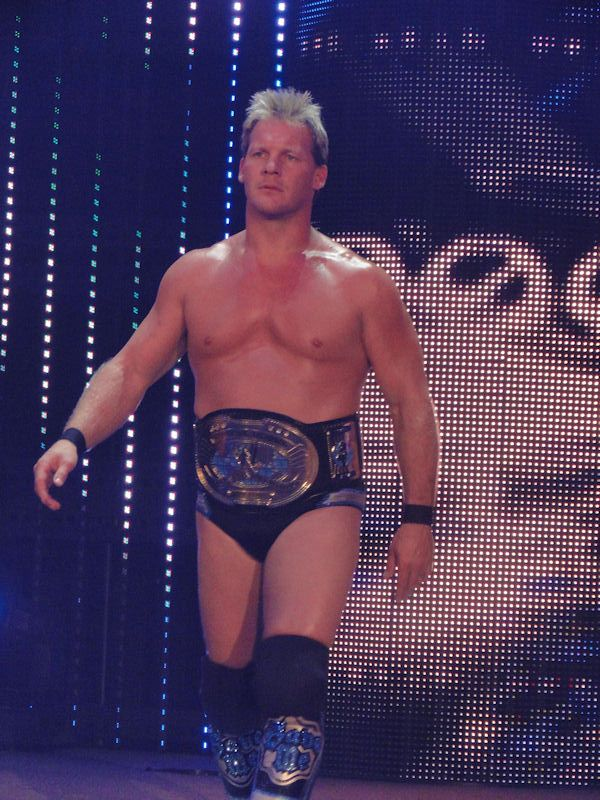
Jericho has held the WWF/WWE Intercontinental Championship on a record nine occasions.

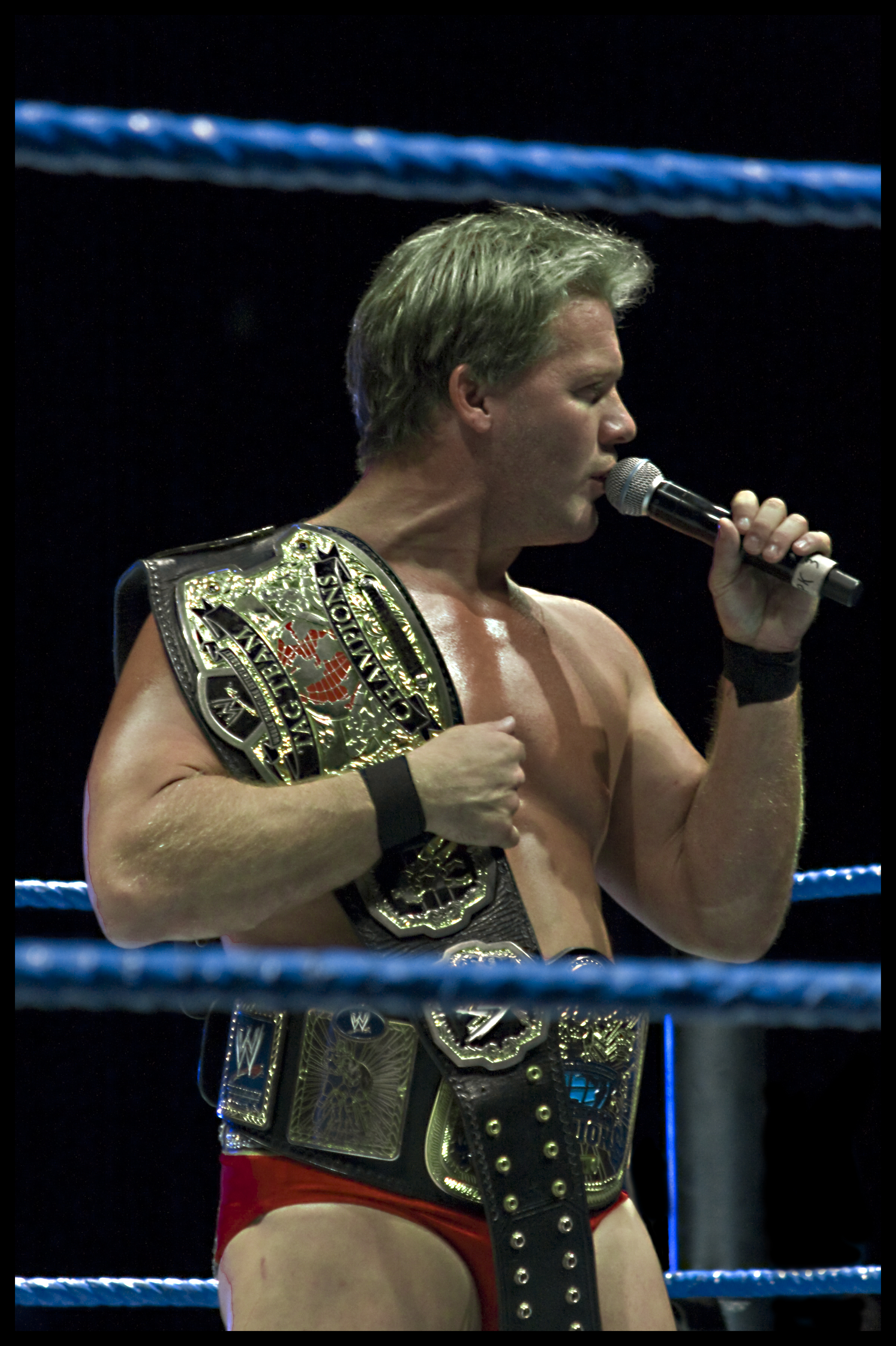
All totaled, Jericho is a seven-time tag team champion in WWE—having held five World Tag Team Championships (around shoulder) and two WWE Tag Team Championships (around waist), with both titles together referred to as the Unified WWE Tag Team Championship.

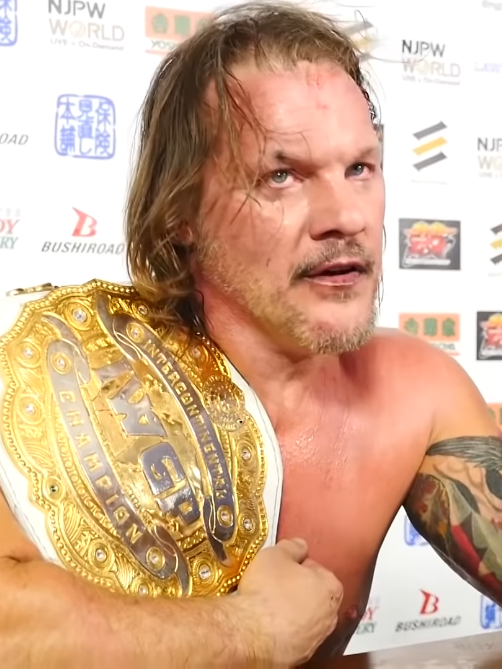
One reign as IWGP Intercontinental Champion bring Jerichos's total to 10 intercontinental championships.

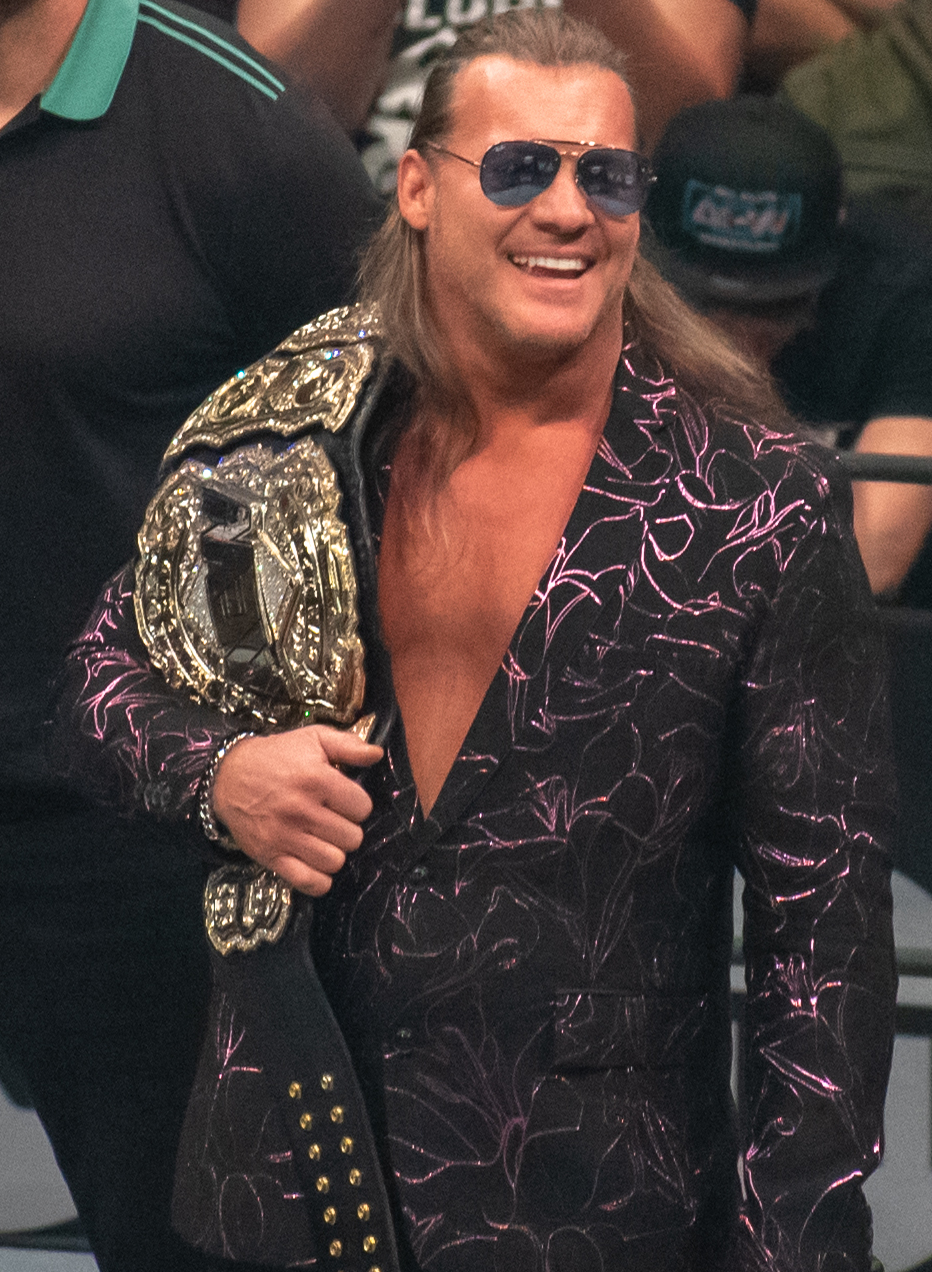
In AEW, Jericho was the inaugural AEW World Champion...

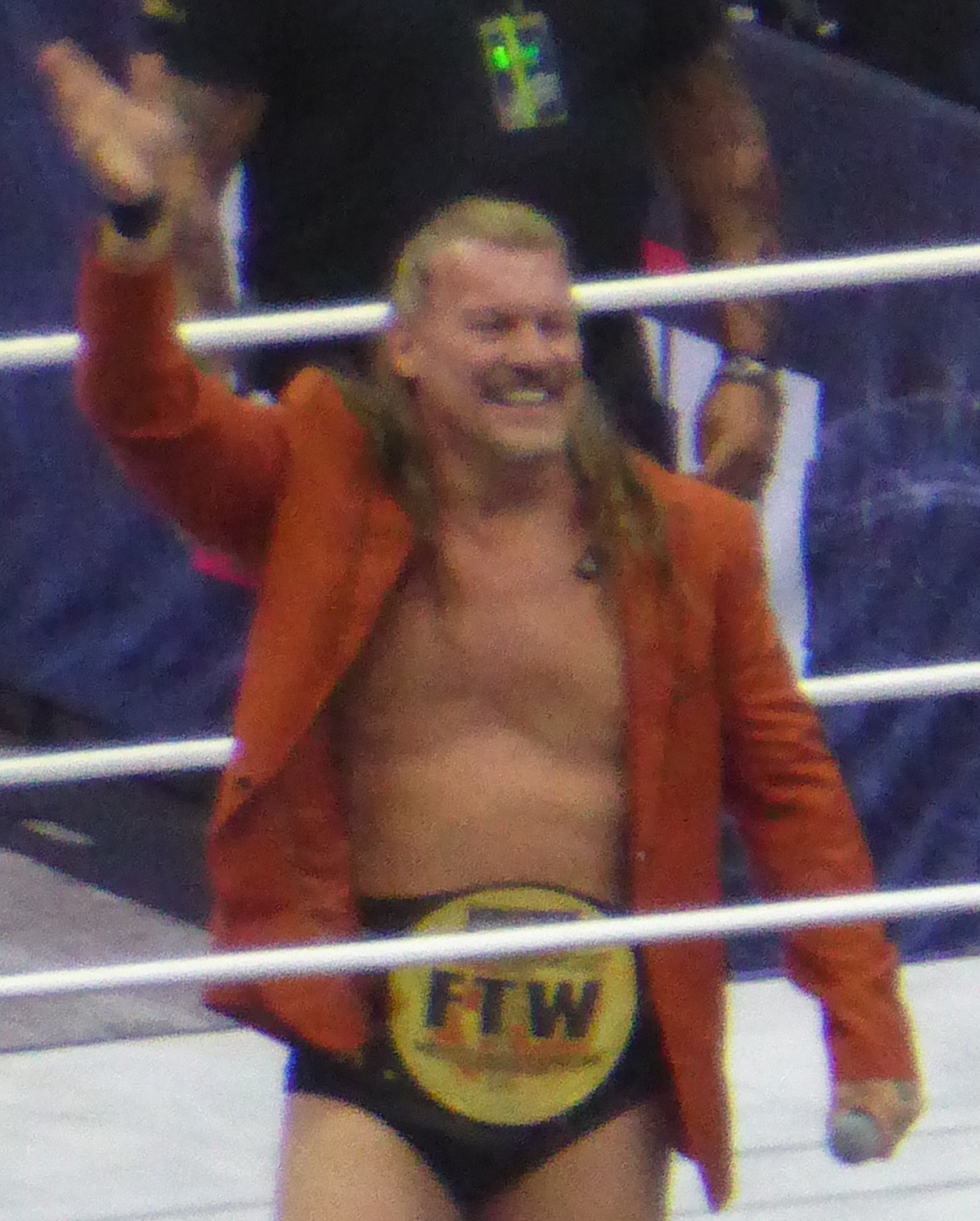
...and a former FTW Champion.

=== Professional wrestling ===
- All Elite Wrestling
  - AEW World Championship (1 time, inaugural)
  - FTW Championship (1 time)
  - AEW Dynamite Awards (2 times)
    - Bleacher Report PPV Moment of the Year (2021) – Stadium Stampede match (The Elite vs The Inner Circle) at Double or Nothing
    - Biggest Beatdown (2021) – The Inner Circle jumps Orange Cassidy on Dynamite
- The Baltimore Sun
  - Feud of the Year (2008) vs. Shawn Michaels
- Canadian Pro-Wrestling Hall of Fame
  - Class of 2023
- Canadian Rocky Mountain Wrestling
  - CRMW North American Heavyweight Championship (1 time)
  - CRMW North American Tag Team Championship (2 times) – with Lance Storm
  - CRMW Mid-Heavyweight Championship (2 times)
- Canadian Wrestling Connection
  - CWC Tag Team Championship (1 time) - with Lance Storm
- Consejo Mundial de Lucha Libre
  - NWA World Middleweight Championship (1 time) (Note: Despite still using the NWA initials, Consejo Mundial de Lucha Libre is no longer a member of the National Wrestling Alliance. As a result, the NWA doesn't recognize or sanction this championship.)
- Extreme Championship Wrestling
  - ECW World Television Championship (1 time)
- International Wrestling Alliance
  - IWA Junior Heavyweight Championship (1 time)
- New Japan Pro-Wrestling
  - IWGP Intercontinental Championship (1 time)
- Pro Wrestling Illustrated
  - Faction of the Year (2021) – with The Inner Circle
  - Feud of the Decade (2000s) vs. Shawn Michaels
  - Feud of the Year (2008) vs. Shawn Michaels
  - Feud of the Year (2021) vs. MJF
  - Most Hated Wrestler of the Year (2002, 2008)
  - Ranked No. 2 of the top 500 singles wrestlers in the PWI 500 in 2009
- Ring of Honor
  - ROH World Championship (2 times)
- Rolling Stone
  - Ranked No. 3 of the 10 best WWE wrestlers of 2016
- Sports Illustrated
  - Ranked No. 5 of the top 10 male wrestlers in 2019
  - Ranked No. 18 of the 20 Greatest WWE Wrestlers Of All Time
- World Championship Wrestling
  - WCW Cruiserweight Championship (4 times)
  - WCW World Television Championship (1 time)
- World Wrestling Federation/Entertainment/WWE
  - Undisputed WWF Championship (1 time) (Note: Jericho's reign occurred after unifying the World Championship (formerly the WCW Championship) and the WWF Championship, making him the first-ever Undisputed WWF Champion.)
  - World Heavyweight Championship (3 times)
  - WCW/World Championship (2 times)
  - WWF/WWE Intercontinental Championship (9 times)
  - WWE United States Championship (2 times)
  - WWF European Championship (1 time)
  - WWF Hardcore Championship (1 time)
  - WWE Tag Team Championship (2 times) – with Edge (1) and Big Show (1) (Note: After Edge suffered an injury, Jericho chose Big Show as a replacement partner to hold the championships with. WWE recognizes this occurrence as two separate reigns for Jericho.)
  - WWF/World Tag Team Championship (Note: Jericho's reigns with Edge and Big Show were as Unified WWE Tag Team Champions.) (5 times) – with Chris Benoit (1), The Rock (1), Christian (1), Edge (1), and Big Show (1)
  - Bragging Rights Trophy (2009) – with Team SmackDown (Kane, Matt Hardy, Finlay, R-Truth, David Hart Smith, and Tyson Kidd)
  - Queen's Cup (2001)
  - Undisputed WWF Championship Tournament (2001)
  - Fourth Grand Slam Champion
  - Ninth Triple Crown Champion
  - Slammy Award (3 times)
    - Extreme Moment of the Year (2014) Executing a crossbody on Bray Wyatt from the top of a steel cage on Raw
    - Superstar of the Year (2008)
    - Tag Team of the Year (2009) – with Big Show
- Wrestle Association "R"
  - WAR International Junior Heavyweight Championship (1 time)
  - WAR International Junior Heavyweight Tag Team Championship (1 time) – with Gedo
- World Wrestling Association
  - WWA Tag Team Championship (1 time) – with El Dandy
- Wrestling Observer Newsletter
  - Wrestler of the Year (2008, 2009, 2019)
  - Best on Interviews (2003, 2008, 2009, 2019)
  - Best on Interviews of the Decade (2000s)
  - Feud of the Year (2008) vs. Shawn Michaels
  - Pro Wrestling Match of the Year (2008) vs. Shawn Michaels in a ladder match at No Mercy
  - Most Underrated Wrestler (1999, 2000)
  - Readers' Favorite Wrestler (1999)
  - United States/Canada MVP (2019)
  - Most Charismatic (2019)
  - Best Box Office Draw (2019)
  - Best Pro Wrestling Book (2011) for Undisputed: How to Become the World Champion in 1,372 Easy Steps
  - Worst Gimmick (2024) as part of The Learning Tree
  - Wrestling Observer Newsletter Hall of Fame (Class of 2010)

=== Music ===
- Revolver Magazine's 100 Greatest Living Rock Stars (2011)
- Loudwire Cage Match Hall of Fame for "Sandpaper" as a member of Fozzy (2012)
- Gold for "Judas" by the RIAA as a member of Fozzy (2022)

=== Other ===
- The Order of the Buffalo Hunt of the province of Manitoba, awarded for his "championship achievements in sports and commitments to underprivileged children". (2004)
- Recipient of the Keys to the City of Winnipeg (2004).
- (Canada) Queen Elizabeth II Platinum Jubilee Medal of the province of Manitoba, for his work with various local charities. (2023)
- The city of Winnipeg renamed the street he grew up on into "Chris Jericho Way" (2023).

== Luchas de Apuestas record ==
Winner (wager)	Loser (wager)	Location	Event	Date	Notes
Corazón de León (hair)	Cro-Magnon (hair)	Mexico City	CMLL Live event	May 30, 1993	
Chris Jericho (championship)	Juventud Guerrera (mask)	Daly City, California	SuperBrawl VIII	February 22, 1998	
Chris Jericho (hair)	Kevin Nash (hair)	Grand Rapids, Michigan	Raw	August 18, 2003	
Rey Mysterio (mask)	Chris Jericho (championship)	Sacramento, California	The Bash	June 28, 2009	
Chris Jericho (hair)	Ortiz (hair)	St. Louis, Missouri	Road Rager	June 15, 2022	
Bandido (mask)	Chris Jericho (championship)	Philadelphia, Pennsylvania	Dynasty	April 6, 2025	

== Bibliography ==
- Jericho, Chris & Fornatale, Peter Thomas (2007). A Lion's Tale: Around the World in Spandex. Grand Central Publishing. 432pp. ISBN 978-0-446-58006-9.
- Jericho, Chris & Fornatale, Peter Thomas (2011). Undisputed: How to Become the World Champion in 1,372 Easy Steps. Grand Central Publishing. 448pp. ISBN 978-0-446-53815-2.
- Jericho, Chris; Fornatale, Peter Thomas (2014). The Best in the World: At What I Have No Idea. Orion Publishing. 320pp. ISBN 978-1-409-13762-7.
- Jericho, Chris; Fornatale, Peter Thomas; Marvez, Alex (2021). The Complete List of Jericho. Lioncrest Publishing. 381pp. ISBN 978-1-544-52003-2.
