= Downfall (game show) =

- Genre: Game show
- Developed by: Chris Ahearn; Graham Shaw
- Directed by: Russell Norman
- Presented by: Chris Jericho
- Country of origin: United States
- No. of episodes: 5

Production
- Executive producers: Ken Warwick; Scott St. John
- Producers: Chris Ahearn; Graham Shaw; Brian Hawley
- Camera setup: Multi-camera
- Running time: 42 minutes
- Production company: FremantleMedia North America

Original release
- Network: ABC
- Release: June 22 – July 20, 2010

Downfall is an American television game show series in which contestants try to answer trivia questions and win up to $1 million while on the roof of a 10-story building in Downtown Los Angeles. The series, hosted by Chris Jericho, premiered on June 22, 2010, on ABC.

== Production and broadcast history ==
In April 2010, ABC named Downfall to its summer schedule. Originally scheduled to debut on June 29, the premiere date was moved to June 22. Casting for the show took place in May, and in June, Chris Jericho was announced as host. The series, originally given a six-episode order by ABC but then reduced to five, is produced by FremantleMedia with Scott St. John as executive producer. The building used in the first season is near Seventh and Alameda streets in Los Angeles, and it is owned by MerueloMaddux.

On July 15, 2010, TVSeriesFinale.com published an article claiming that after the fifth episode of Downfall aired on July 20, the remaining episode would be replaced with a two-hour Wipeout special. The same day, on his official Twitter page host Chris Jericho claimed that only five episodes of the show were produced due to editing, a faster pace and a shortage of contestants. He also stated that more episodes are scheduled to be filmed in the fall, but no recordings have occurred. It is now listed as cancelled on TvSeriesFinale.com.

== Format ==
Contestants stand on top of a 10-story building in Downtown Los Angeles and are joined by Jericho along with what is billed as the "largest conveyor belt ever seen on TV". The belt holds replicas of all the cash and prizes that the contestants may win. The game consists of up to seven timed rounds during which contestants attempt to answer category-based trivia questions as they watch their potential winnings move along the belt. Each contestant picks one of nine categories and must correctly answer the questions as quickly as possible before the cash and prize replicas fall off the building and are destroyed. Most rounds feature two or three prizes each. The first prize is located one-quarter of the way down the belt, the second is at the halfway mark, the third (if applicable) is three-quarters of the way down, and the cash is held in a transparent display case.

Contestants can answer a question as many times as they wish, and are not able to move on to the next question until it is answered correctly or the contestant chooses to pass. Every time a question is passed, the belt gets faster. In addition, the starting speed of the belt increases as the contestant advances to later rounds. If a contestant successfully completes a round by answering the requisite number of questions (see table below) before the cash prize falls off the belt, the contestant wins the cash plus any prizes still on the belt. If the contestant successfully completes round 3, he or she is guaranteed $25,000 in cash, but prizes are always at risk. After each round, the contestant is given the choice of quitting and keeping the cash and prizes won, or risking it to continue to the next round. If the cash prize falls, the contestant loses and the game is over. In addition to losing any prizes won, the contestant is also dropped from the building (wearing a safety harness that stops their fall shortly before impact). In the final round, worth $1 million, the contestant is placed on the belt with the money and must correctly answer all the questions before falling off the edge.

A contestant who feels he or she cannot answer the remaining questions before all prizes fall may hit the "panic button" at the podium to reset the current round. The contestant then replays the level with a new category from the list. All non-cash prizes are forfeited if the contestant chooses to use the panic button, even if the prizes are not dropped before the button is pressed. The button may be used twice: once to allow the contestant to "surrender a personal possession" and once to get help from a friend or family member. When a contestant chooses to surrender a possession, an item of great importance to him or her is placed before the cash on the belt and, in order to salvage the item, the contestant must complete the round before the item falls. When help from a companion is desired, the partner is strapped into a safety harness and placed in front of the cash on the belt. The contestant's companion can help by shouting answers but all final answers must come from the contestant. If the companion falls, he or she can no longer be of use but the round continues until the cash falls. There is a short span of time between the companion going over the edge and the companion actually dropping. During this time, the companion can still assist; however, once the companion is over the edge, for safety reasons, they must be dropped, even if the contestant completes the round before that happens.

=== Prizes ===
All prizes salvaged up to that point in the game are won if the contestant chooses to walk away with the earned money. If the contestant fails, all non-cash prizes are lost.

==== Money Tree ====
The chart below details the sequence of prize values for each round of the game.

| Round | Correct answers needed | Value if challenge is met |
|---|---|---|
| 1 | 4 out of 10 | $5,000 |
| 2 | 5 out of 10 | $10,000 |
| 3 | 6 out of 10 | $25,000 (guaranteed) |
| 4 | 7 out of 10 | $50,000 |
| 5 | 8 out of 10 | $100,000 |
| 6 | 9 out of 10 | $250,000 |
| 7 | 10 out of 10 | $1,000,000 (grand prize) |

^{1}The credits state that the "million dollar prize is paid in either 40 annual installments or as net present value."

== Ratings ==
=== Season 1 (2010) ===
| No. | Airdate | Rating | Share | 18–49 | Viewers (millions) |
|---|---|---|---|---|---|
| 1 | Tuesday, June 22, 2010 | 3.1 | 5 | 2.0/6 | 5.86 |
| 2 | Tuesday, June 29, 2010 | 2.3 | 4 | 1.4/5 | 4.18 |
| 3 | Tuesday, July 6, 2010 | 2.1 | 4 | 1.2/3 | 3.77 |
| 4 | Tuesday, July 13, 2010 | 2.2 | 4 | 1.4/4 | 3.80 |
| 5 | Tuesday, July 20, 2010 | 2.0 | 3 | 1.2/3 | 3.37 |
