= Jeri-Show =

Professional wrestling tag team

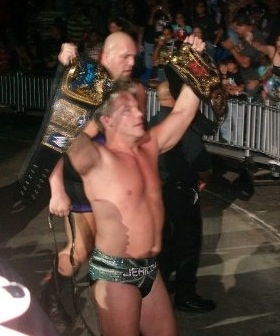
- Jeri-Show as the Unified WWE Tag Team Champions

Tag team
- Members: Big Show / Paul Wight; Chris Jericho
- Name(s): Jeri-Show; Chris Jericho and The Big Show
- Billed heights: Big Show: 7 ft 0 in (2.13 m); Chris Jericho: 6 ft 0 in (1.83 m)
- Combined billed weight: 711 lb (323 kg)
- Debut: July 26, 2009
- Years active: 2009–2010; 2023–2024

The team of Paul Wight and Chris Jericho, better known as Jeri-Show, are a professional wrestling tag team currently signed with All Elite Wrestling (AEW). They previously competed in the World Wrestling Entertainment (WWE) promotion, where Wight was known as (The) Big Show.

The duo made their debut in July 2009 at WWE's Night of Champions pay-per-view event, where Jericho replaced the legitimate injured Edge with Show as his tag team partner in his defense of the Unified WWE Tag Team Championship (which was made by the unification of the World Tag Team Championship and WWE Tag Team Championship).

Throughout the remainder of 2009, Jeri-Show were involved in several highly promoted feuds and angles, as well as defending the Unified WWE Tag Team Championship and challenging for the World Heavyweight Championship. The duo also headlined two of WWE's pay-per-view events during their short tenure together, with the first being at Survivor Series and the second at TLC: Tables, Ladders & Chairs.

After their WWE departures in 2019 and 2021, respectively, Jericho had signed with AEW as one of the earliest members of the roster while Wight (formerly Big Show) followed two years later.

== History ==
=== World Wrestling Entertainment / WWE (2009–2016) ===
==== Unified WWE Tag Team Champions (2009–2010) ====
At The Bash on June 28, 2009, Jericho and his then partner Edge, both heels, won the Unified WWE Tag Team Championship (which consisted of the World Tag Team Championship and the WWE Tag Team Championship) as surprise entrants in a tag team match. When Edge suffered a legitimate torn Achilles tendon shortly thereafter which left him unable to wrestle, Jericho exploited a contractual loophole that allowed him to choose a new partner to replace Edge so that Jericho's reign could continue uninterrupted, while insulting Edge for being injury prone.

On July 26 at Night of Champions, Jericho revealed fellow heel Big Show as his new tag team partner and they defeated Legacy members Cody Rhodes and Ted DiBiase to retain the Unified WWE Tag Team Championship, thus allowing Big Show (who was from the Raw brand) and Jericho (who was from the SmackDown brand) to appear on both brands. Jeri-Show would then feud with Cryme Tyme (JTG and Shad Gaspard), which culminated in a successful title defense for Jeri-Show at SummerSlam on August 23. Jericho and Big Show would then feud with Montel Vontavious Porter and Mark Henry, which would also result in another successful title defense for Jeri-Show at Breaking Point on September 13 against them. Next, Jeri-Show would move on to feud with Batista, who then challenged for the Unified WWE Tag Team Championship with Jericho's rival Rey Mysterio at Hell in a Cell on October 4, where resulted in another successful title defense.

On the October 5 episode of Raw, Jeri-Show would begin a feud with Shawn Michaels and Triple H of D-Generation X (D-X) following a loss in a non-title match. Leading up to Bragging Rights, Jericho was named as a co-captain (with Kane) for Team SmackDown while Big Show joined Team Raw, which was captained by D-X. At Bragging Rights on October 25, Big Show turned on Team Raw when he attacked his teammates Kofi Kingston and Triple H, resulting in Jericho getting the win for Team SmackDown. Big Show would then reveal that his motives for aiding Team SmackDown was so that he would be granted a shot against SmackDown's World Heavyweight Champion The Undertaker, while Jericho would insert himself into the title match as well after defeating Kane, thus making it a triple threat match. At Survivor Series on November 22, The Undertaker retained his World Heavyweight Championship after Jericho and Big Show turned on each other despite working together throughout most of the match. Jeri-Show would then continue their feud with D-X and on December 13 at TLC: Tables, Ladders & Chairs, they lost the Unified WWE Tag Team Championship to D-X in a Tables, Ladders and Chairs match, ending their reign at 140 days. On the December 14 episode of Raw, Jeri-Show won a Slammy Award for "Tag Team of the Year", while that same night they used their rematch clause against D-X, who quickly intentionally disqualified themselves and retained the Unified WWE Tag Team Championship (as a result, Jericho, from the SmackDown brand, could not appear on Raw as he was no longer a Unified WWE Tag Team Champion). D-X granted Jeri-Show yet another rematch for the Unified WWE Tag Team Championship, with the additional stipulation that Jericho had to "leave Raw forever" if Jeri-Show lost, which they did on the January 4, 2010 episode of Raw, marking the end of Jeri-Show.

After their breakup, Edge made his return at the 2010 Royal Rumble match to feud with Jericho, eliminating Jericho en route to winning the Rumble. Meanwhile, Big Show would go on to win the Unified WWE Tag Team Championship back from D-X when he teamed with The Miz, forming ShoMiz. Jericho would eventually return to Raw again when he was drafted to the Raw brand through the 2010 WWE draft.

==== Unofficial reunions (2012–2016) ====
On the July 9, 2012 episode of Raw, Jeri-Show (as villains) reunited for one-time to take on John Cena and Kane in a tag team match, which they went to lose by disqualification.

On the September 5, 2014 episode of SmackDown, Jeri-Show (as fan favorites) had a one-night reunion, competing in a ten-man tag team match that consisted of themselves teaming with John Cena, Mark Henry and Roman Reigns against Kane, Seth Rollins and The Wyatt Family (Bray Wyatt, Erick Rowan and Luke Harper), which Jeri-Show's team won by disqualification after The Wyatt Family broke up Cena's STF on Rollins and refused to stop their assault on Cena.

On the January 28, 2016 episode of SmackDown, Big Show helped Jericho, Reigns and Dean Ambrose from a Wyatt Family assault, having a one night reunion for Jeri-Show.

=== All Elite Wrestling (2023–2024) ===
Jericho filed a trademark to the team name in February 2023 while both him and Big Show, referred by his real name Paul Wight, were signed to All Elite Wrestling (AEW). The duo got involved in a feud against the Don Callis Family in November. They were officially referred to as Jeri-Show during a match at Jericho cruise in January 2024.

== Championships and accomplishments ==
- World Wrestling Entertainment
  - World Tag Team Championship (1 time)
  - WWE Tag Team Championship (1 time)
  - Slammy Award (1 time)
    - Tag Team of the Year (2009)
