= WWE Breaking Point =

2009 World Wrestling Entertainment pay-per-view event

Breaking Point
- Promotional poster featuring Triple H
- Promotion: World Wrestling Entertainment
- Brand(s): Raw; SmackDown; ECW
- Date: September 13, 2009
- City: Montreal, Quebec, Canada
- Venue: Bell Centre
- Attendance: 12,000
- Buy rate: 169,000

Pay-per-view chronology
| ← Previous; SummerSlam | Next → Hell in a Cell |

WWE in Canada chronology
| ← Previous; Unforgiven | Next → Roadblock |

Breaking Point was a 2009 professional wrestling pay-per-view (PPV) event produced by the American company World Wrestling Entertainment (WWE). It took place on September 13, 2009, at the Bell Centre in Montreal, Quebec, Canada, and was held for wrestlers from the promotion's Raw, SmackDown, and ECW brand divisions. The theme of the event was that each main event match was contested under submission or surrender rules.

In the main events, CM Punk retained SmackDown's World Heavyweight Championship against The Undertaker in a submission match, John Cena won Raw's WWE Championship from Randy Orton in an "I Quit" match, and in a bout from Raw, The Legacy (Cody Rhodes and Ted DiBiase Jr.) defeated D-Generation X (Triple H and Shawn Michaels) in a Submissions Count Anywhere match. Also on the card, Unified WWE Tag Team Champions Jeri-Show (Chris Jericho and Big Show) defeated Montel Vontavious Porter and Mark Henry, Kofi Kingston successfully defended Raw's United States Championship against The Miz, Kane defeated The Great Khali in a Singapore Cane match, and Christian successfully defended the ECW Championship against William Regal.

Breaking Point replaced WWE's previously annual September event, Unforgiven; however, it was a one-off event, as the September slot was in turn replaced by Night of Champions in 2010, which was moved back from its previous July slot. The Breaking Point name was later used for the submission system included in the WWE '12 video game and some of its sequels. The event had 169,000 pay-per-view buys, down from the Unforgiven 2008 figure of 211,000 buys.

== Production ==
=== Background ===
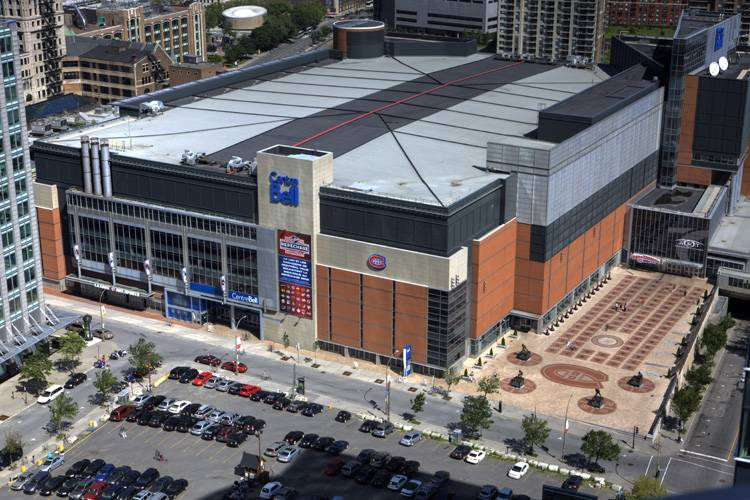
The event was held at the Bell Centre in Montreal, Quebec, Canada.

In May 2009, the American professional wrestling promotion World Wrestling Entertainment (WWE) ran a poll on their website in which fans could vote on the name for that year's September pay-per-view (PPV) event, which would replace the company's previously annual September event, Unforgiven. Breaking Point was chosen over Submission Sunday, Total Submission, and Submit & Quit, and the concept was that each main event match would be contested under submission or surrender rules. The event was scheduled to be held on September 13, 2009, at the Bell Centre in Montreal, Quebec, Canada and featured wrestlers from the Raw, SmackDown, and ECW brands. Tickets went on sale on July 11.

=== Storylines ===
The event included matches that resulted from scripted storylines. Results were predetermined by WWE's writers on the Raw, SmackDown, and ECW brands, while storylines were produced on WWE's weekly television shows, Raw, SmackDown, and ECW.

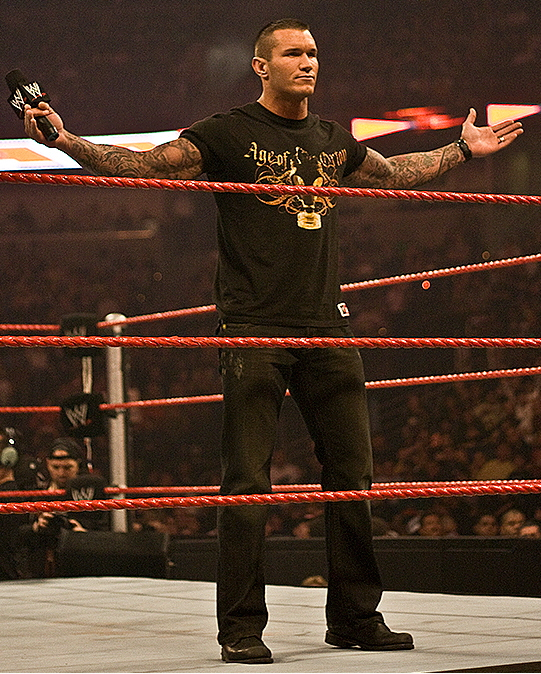
Randy Orton lost Raw's WWE Championship against John Cena in an "I Quit" match.

At SummerSlam, Randy Orton defended the WWE Championship against John Cena. Orton intentionally got himself disqualified and was counted out of the ring. This would have allowed Orton to retain the title, but the match was repeatedly restarted and eventually Orton pinned Cena with illegal leverage. As a result of Orton's actions in the match, WWE Chairman, Vince McMahon awarded Cena a rematch. In the spirit of the submission concept of the show, the title was defended in an "I Quit" match, a match that can only be won by causing the opponent to say "I Quit". Mr. McMahon added another stipulation if anyone interferes in the match on Orton's Behalf (in respond to Brett Dibiase's actions) Orton will be immediately stripped the title.

At SummerSlam, CM Punk defeated Jeff Hardy in a Tables, Ladders, and Chairs match to win the World Heavyweight Championship. After the match, The Undertaker returned after a four-month hiatus and attacked Punk with a chokeslam. On the following SmackDown, Punk was scheduled to defend the title against Undertaker at Breaking Point in a submission match.

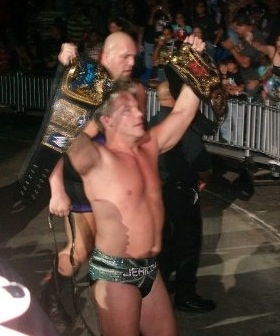
Jeri-Show (Chris Jericho and Big Show) defended the Unified WWE Tag Team Championship against MVP and Mark Henry.

The guest host and storyline matchmaker of the August 24 episode of Raw was welterweight boxing champion, Floyd Mayweather Jr., who had a match with The Big Show at WrestleMania XXIV the previous year. Due to the lingering animosity, Mayweather awarded Montel Vontavious Porter (MVP) and Mark Henry a match against The Big Show and his tag team partner, Chris Jericho, for the Unified WWE Tag Team Championship at Breaking Point, provided they defeat them in an exhibition match that night; MVP and Henry gained their chance after Mayweather gave MVP brass knuckles while the referee was distracted, to knock out and pin Jericho for the win.

During a night-long challenge on the July 27 episode of Raw, to determine who would challenge Randy Orton for the WWE Championship at SummerSlam, Triple H had to defeat his opponent, Cody Rhodes, in the allotted time of 6:49 set by prior competitor, Mark Henry, but was not successful in doing so; this was followed by Rhodes assaulting his incapacitated opponent with the assistance of his affiliate in The Legacy, Ted DiBiase Jr. This led to Triple H enlisting help in the returning Shawn Michaels to reform the faction, D-Generation X (DX), to face his adversaries at SummerSlam in a winning effort. After continued assaults, a Submissions Count Anywhere match between the two teams was scheduled for Breaking Point.

Since The Bash, Kane and The Great Khali had been in constant conflict, taking turns interfering in each other's matches, blindsiding each other, or, in Kane's case, avoiding Khali. To get Khali's attention and the upper hand, Kane kidnapped his adversary's translator and storyline brother, Ranjin Singh, before their match at SummerSlam, which was won by Kane. Khali continued after Kane following the show, leading to the announcement of a match between the two with legal use of a Singapore cane.

== Event ==
Other on-screen personnel
| Role: | Name: |
|---|---|
| Commentators | Michael Cole (Raw) |
| Commentators | Jerry Lawler (Raw) |
| Commentators | Jim Ross (SmackDown) |
| Commentators | Todd Grisham (SmackDown) |
| Commentators | Josh Mathews (ECW) |
| Commentators | Matt Striker (ECW) |
| Interviewer | Josh Mathews |
| Ring announcers | Lilian Garcia (Raw) |
| Ring announcers | Justin Roberts (SmackDown) |
| Ring announcers | Tony Chimel (ECW) |
| Referees | Charles Robinson |
| Referees | John Cone |
| Referees | Scott Armstrong |
| Referees | Chad Patton |

Before Breaking Point aired on pay-per-view, an untelevised match took place between Evan Bourne and Chavo Guerrero. Bourne won the match by pinfall after a shooting star press.

=== Preliminary matches ===
The show aired with the tag team match for the Unified WWE Tag Team Championship, as Jeri-Show (Chris Jericho and Big Show) faced Montel Vontavious Porter (MVP) and Mark Henry. Henry countered Jericho's "Codebreaker" and whilst the referee was tending to him, Big Show delivered a knockout punch to Henry, allowing Jericho to get the pinfall.

The following match was the WWE United States Championship match. Defending champion Kofi Kingston countered a neckbreaker by The Miz and delivered his finisher "Trouble in Paradise" to secure the win.

The first ever Submissions Count Anywhere match pitted D-Generation X (Triple H and Shawn Michaels) against The Legacy (Cody Rhodes and Ted DiBiase). The match was quickly taken out of the ring as Michaels threw DiBiase over the barricade. Michaels attempted to make Rhodes submit by using a sleeper hold on the rail of the steps in the crowd. Meanwhile, Triple H and Rhodes fought in the lobby of the arena and eventually all four men returned to ringside. Triple H placed Rhodes' legs through the back of a steel chair and performed a Boston crab while Michaels simultaneously performed a camel clutch on him. Rhodes later threw Michaels out of the stands in the crowd, leaving he and DiBiase to double team on Triple H. They ended up in the backstage area where Triple H delivered a spinebuster to DiBiase through a catering table. A crossface on Rhodes was broken after DiBiase hit Triple H with an icebox. Rhodes and DiBiase headed back to the ring with Michaels in tow and dominated him for a while. Michaels started to fight back when he hit Rhodes with the "Sweet Chin Music" and applied a figure-four leglock, but this hold was broken by DiBiase. After, Rhodes performed the figure-four leglock around the ring post on Michaels whilst DiBiase performed the "Million Dollar Dream", which resulted in Michaels submitting.

There was a Singapore Cane Match between Kane and The Great Khali who was accompanied to the ring by Ranjin Singh. Kane used the cane to apply a submission hold to Khali's arm only for him to break it. Khali used his signature "Vice Grip", but Kane broke out of the hold by hitting Khali with a cane. Singh interfered in the match allowing Khali to get the advantage, but Kane managed to get the upper hand and delivered a chokeslam to Khali to get the victory.

The ECW Championship match saw defending champion Christian face William Regal who was accompanied by Ezekiel Jackson and Vladimir Kozlov. However, before the match began, ECW General Manager Tiffany announced that Jackson and Kozlov were banned from ringside. If they refuse to leave immediately, Regal would lose by the match by forfeit. In a physical match, Christian dodged a left knee from Regal and executed the "Killswitch" to get the victory.

Pat Patterson made an appearance and was interrupted by Dolph Ziggler. Ziggler then attacked Patterson, but John Morrison made the save.

=== Main event matches ===
The "I Quit" match for the WWE Championship was next which saw defending champion Randy Orton face John Cena, in which if anyone interfered on Orton's behalf, Orton would be stripped of the title immediately. After wrestling in the ring, Orton threw Cena towards the commentary desk and hit him with a camera monitor. Orton dragged Cena back to the ring, hoping to deliver an "RKO" to him onto a steel chair, but Cena countered. The action went to ringside as Orton threw Cena into the steel steps. After Orton had punished Cena with the steel steps, the referee asked if he wanted to quit to which he refused. Orton then handcuffed one of Cena's arms to the middle rope and continued to assault him by hitting him with the referee's microphone. After refusing to quit once again, Cena was placed on the steel steps in a sitting position with his arms in handcuffs hanging over the top of the ring post. Orton then poured a bottle of water over Cena and when asked if he wanted to quit, Cena spat the water in Orton's face. Orton repeatedly hit Cena with a Singapore cane and choked him with it until Cena delivered a low blow to Orton. Cena escaped from the ring post only to be hit with a steel chair by Orton and handcuffed with one arm to the bottom rope outside the ring. Cena managed to give a one-armed "Attitude Adjustment" to Orton, took the key from around Orton's neck and handcuffed himself to Orton. Whilst still handcuffed together, Cena dragged Orton inside the ring and Orton hit an "RKO" on Cena. Orton reached for the key to the handcuffs at the other side of the ring but was unsuccessful as Cena held him back. Cena then applied the STF, tugging at the handcuffs to hurt Orton's wrist. As a result, Orton said the words 'I quit', to which Cena was victorious.

The main event was a submission match for the World Heavyweight Championship between defending champion CM Punk and The Undertaker. Immediately after the bell rang, Punk retreated outside the ring and once back in the ring, he cornered The Undertaker with multiple elbows to the back of his head. The Undertaker tossed Punk out of the ring, Punk ran back to the ring and The Undertaker hit him with a clothesline. The two ended up at ringside, The Undertaker threw Punk into the barricade and missed a big boot. Punk began to attack The Undertaker with a steel chair. The two returned to the ring and Punk countered The Undertaker's signature "Old School" and delivered a superplex from the top rope. The Undertaker later went for a chokeslam, but was met with a roundhouse kick from Punk. The Undertaker eventually applied "Hell's Gate" and Punk tapped out. However, Theodore Long interrupted the celebration by informing everyone that The Undertaker's submission "Hell's Gate" was banned by Vickie Guerrero. Long ordered the match to be continued, when the bell rang Punk immediately applied the anaconda vise and the bell rang to signal the match was over although The Undertaker did not submit. Regardless of this Punk retained the title thus mimicking the Montreal Screwjob.

== Aftermath ==
The following night on Raw, two rematches were scheduled for Hell in a Cell as Hell in a Cell matches: John Cena vs. Randy Orton for the WWE Championship and D-Generation X (Triple H and Shawn Michaels) vs. The Legacy (Cody Rhodes and Ted DiBiase).

The Undertaker would kidnap Teddy Long in his limousine on the following SmackDown, eventually scheduling him to face CM Punk for the World Heavyweight Championship in a Hell in a Cell match at Hell in a Cell.

Breaking Point would be a one-off event for WWE, as the event's September slot was replaced with Night of Champions in 2010, which was previously held in July. Montreal would later receive another pay-per-view event when Elimination Chamber was held on February 18, 2023.

== Results ==
| No. | Results | Stipulations | Times |
|---|---|---|---|
| 1^{D} | Evan Bourne defeated Chavo Guerrero by pinfall | Singles match | 05:00 |
| 2 | Jeri-Show (Chris Jericho and Big Show) (c) defeated The World's Strongest Tag Team (Montel Vontavious Porter and Mark Henry) by pinfall | Tag team match for the Unified WWE Tag Team Championship (Note: The name "Unified WWE Tag Team Championship" referred to both the World Tag Team Championship and WWE Tag Team Championship being held and defended together, although both titles remained independently active.) | 12:13 |
| 3 | Kofi Kingston (c) defeated The Miz by pinfall | Singles match for the WWE United States Championship | 11:56 |
| 4 | The Legacy (Cody Rhodes and Ted DiBiase) defeated D-Generation X (Triple H and Shawn Michaels) | Submissions Count Anywhere match | 21:44 |
| 5 | Kane defeated The Great Khali (with Ranjin Singh) by pinfall | Singapore Cane match | 05:50 |
| 6 | Christian (c) defeated William Regal by pinfall | Singles match for the ECW Championship; Ezekiel Jackson and Vladimir Kozlov were banned from ringside. If they had refused to leave immediately, then Regal would have lost the match by forfeit. | 10:15 |
| 7 | John Cena defeated Randy Orton (c) | "I Quit" match for the WWE Championship; Had anyone interfered in the match on Orton's behalf, Orton would have been stripped of the title immediately. | 19:46 |
| 8 | CM Punk (c) defeated The Undertaker | Submission match for the World Heavyweight Championship | 08:52 |
(c) / – the champion(s) heading into the match; D / – this was a dark match

== See also ==
- Professional wrestling in Canada
