= TLC: Tables, Ladders & Chairs (2009) =

World Wrestling Entertainment pay-per-view event

- Promotional poster featuring Edge and The Undertaker during their TLC match at One Night Stand (2008)
- Promotion: World Wrestling Entertainment
- Brand(s): Raw; SmackDown; ECW
- Date: December 13, 2009
- City: San Antonio, Texas
- Venue: AT&T Center
- Attendance: 15,226
- Buy rate: 228,000

Pay-per-view chronology
← Previous; Survivor Series	Next → Royal Rumble

TLC: Tables, Ladders & Chairs chronology
← Previous; First	Next → 2010

The 2009 TLC: Tables, Ladders & Chairs was a professional wrestling pay-per-view (PPV) event produced by World Wrestling Entertainment (WWE). It was the inaugural TLC: Tables, Ladders & Chairs and took place on December 13, 2009, at the AT&T Center in San Antonio, Texas, held for wrestlers from the promotion's Raw, SmackDown, and ECW brand divisions. The concept of the show was based around the primary matches of the card each utilizing tables, ladders, and chairs as legal weapons.

The main event saw D-Generation X (Triple H and Shawn Michaels) defeat Jeri-Show (Chris Jericho and Big Show) in a Tables, Ladders, and Chairs match to win the Unified WWE Tag Team Championship. Other primary matches included Christian defeating Shelton Benjamin in a Ladder match to retain the ECW Championship, Sheamus defeating John Cena in a Tables match to win Raw's WWE Championship, and The Undertaker defeating Batista in a Chairs match to retain SmackDown's World Heavyweight Championship. Other matches on the card included John Morrison versus Drew McIntyre for SmackDown's Intercontinental Championship, Michelle McCool versus Mickie James for SmackDown's WWE Women's Championship, and Randy Orton versus Kofi Kingston.

The event replaced Armageddon as the annual December PPV, and it drew 228,000 pay-per-view buys. This was the only TLC event to feature the ECW brand and the ECW Championship as the brand was dissolved in February 2010, deactivating the championship along with it.

== Production ==
=== Background ===
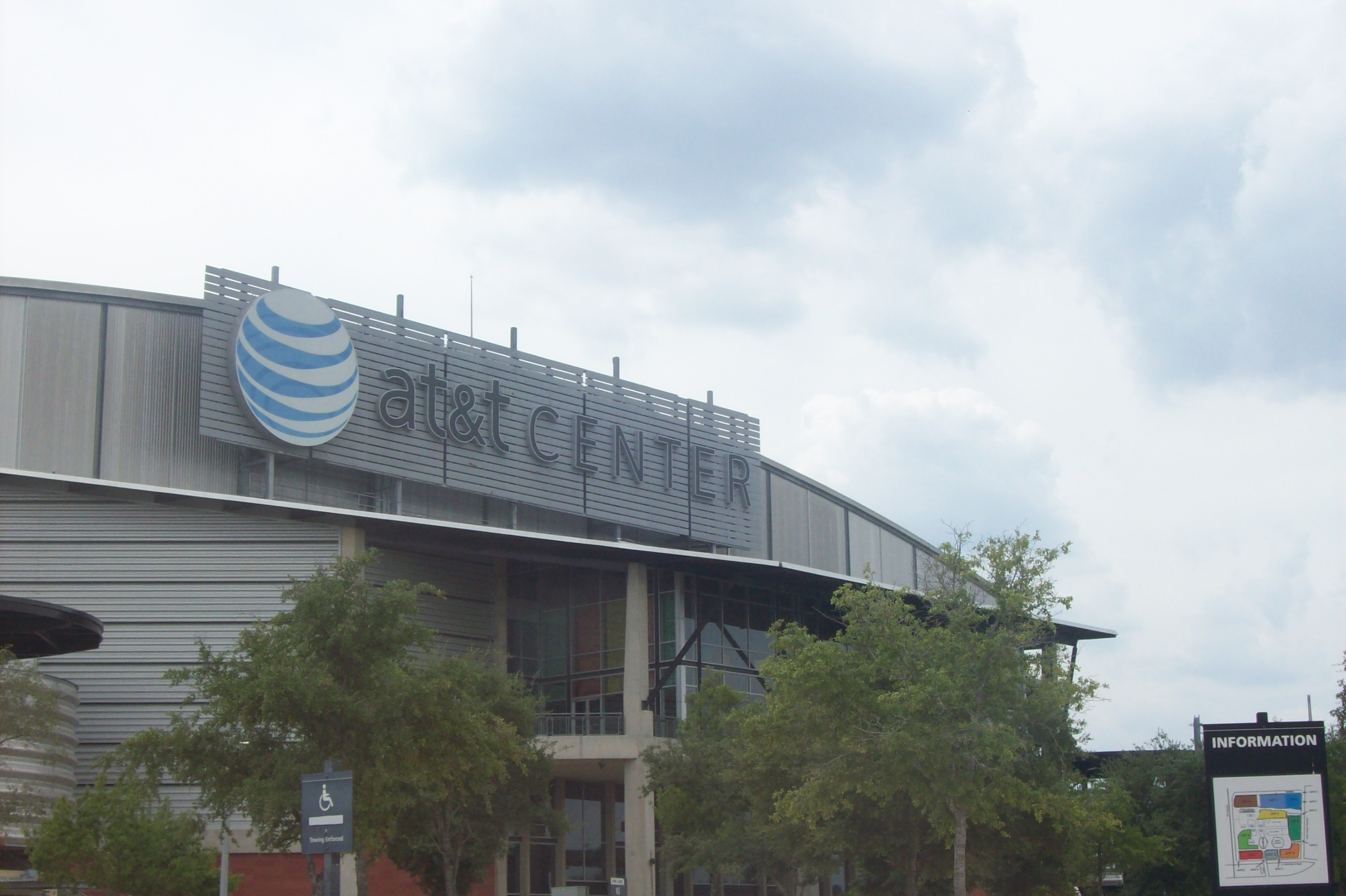
The inaugural TLC: Tables, Ladders & Chairs was held at the AT&T Center in San Antonio, Texas.

In August 2009, the professional wrestling company World Wrestling Entertainment (WWE) ran a poll on their official website in which fans could vote on the concept of that year's December pay-per-view (PPV) event that would replace their previously annual December event, Armageddon. The choices in the poll included an event themed around street fight main events, an event featuring a single-elimination tournament, and an event featuring matches that contained stipulations using tables, ladders, and/or chairs as legal weapons with the main event being a Tables, Ladders, and Chairs (TLC) match. The TLC theme was chosen, and the event was named TLC: Tables, Ladders & Chairs. It was scheduled to take place on December 13, 2009, at the AT&T Center in San Antonio, Texas and featured wrestlers from the Raw, SmackDown, and ECW brand divisions. Tickets went on sale on August 29.

=== Storylines ===
The professional wrestling matches at TLC: Tables, Ladders & Chairs featured professional wrestlers performing as characters in scripted events pre-determined by the hosting promotion, WWE. Storylines between the characters were produced on WWE's weekly television shows, Raw, SmackDown, and ECW.

On the November 23 episode of Raw, guest host and storyline matchmaker Jesse Ventura arranged an interpromotional "Breakthrough Battle Royal", where the winner gained a shot at their brand's world championship at TLC. Qualifying matches were also held that night with each wrestler having the distinction of having held neither the WWE Championship nor the World Heavyweight Championship. In qualifiers, Kofi Kingston defeated Dolph Ziggler, Sheamus defeated Finlay, the team of Mark Henry, Montel Vontavious Porter and R-Truth defeated the team of Jack Swagger, Chris Masters and Chavo Guerrero Jr. in a six-man tag team match. Disagreeing with the battle royal concept, former world champion Randy Orton attacked Primo and defeated Primo's intended opponent, Evan Bourne, to qualify. In the last qualifying match, the team of The Legacy (Cody Rhodes and Ted DiBiase Jr.) defeated the team of Cryme Tyme (Shad Gaspard and JTG) to qualify. In the main event, Sheamus won the battle royal, last eliminating Kofi Kingston and earning him the chance to face WWE Champion John Cena at TLC. A contract signing was immediately held when Sheamus attacked Cena, slamming him through a table. Declaring his preference of Sheamus over Cena, Ventura made the prospective match a tables match.

During his night as guest host, Ventura also booked a tag team match for the Unified WWE Tag Team Championship at the TLC event, where the champions Chris Jericho and The Big Show will defend their titles against the team of Triple H and Shawn Michaels (collectively known as D-Generation X) in a Tables, Ladders, and Chairs match.

On the November 24 episode of ECW, Shelton Benjamin defeated Zack Ryder to become the number one contender to the ECW Championship. ECW Champion Christian stated that the ECW Championship has been overlooked on recent pay-per-views and challenged Benjamin to a ladder match.

After defeating Rey Mysterio Jr. at Survivor Series, Batista challenged World Heavyweight Champion, The Undertaker. Batista was interrupted by Kane who challenged him to a physical confrontation, which Batista refused. On the November 27 episode of SmackDown, the two were pitted in a match, with the winner receiving a title match against The Undertaker at TLC. When outside of the referee's sight, Batista attacked Kane's knee with a steel chair and won the match by countout. A few days later, it was announced that the title match would be a Chairs match.

On the December 4 episode of SmackDown, WWE Intercontinental Champion John Morrison faced Drew McIntyre in an exhibition contest, which saw the latter win. Later in the evening, McIntyre was awarded another match against Morrison for his title.

Since Bragging Rights, Randy Orton and Kofi Kingston had been in constant conflict ever since Kingston prevented Orton's teammates Cody Rhodes and Ted DiBiase from interfering in Orton's Iron Man match against John Cena for the WWE Championship. The rivalry led to the two each captaining teams for a five-on-five Survivor Series elimination match at Survivor Series, in which Kingston's team won. On the November 30 episode of Raw, Kingston was scheduled to wrestle Orton in a singles match but was ambushed by Rhodes and DiBiase before the match began and hence was too weak to offer a fair match with Orton. The following week, Raw guest host Mark Cuban booked Kingston into another match with Orton, with Cuban serving as guest referee. Still bitter from the events at the 2003 Survivor Series, where Orton performed an RKO on him, Cuban gave a fast count for Kingston's pin and gave him the win. Cuban then said that the two were now tied with one victory apiece and the match that would settle the score would take place at the TLC event.

On the December 11 episode of SmackDown, WWE Women's Champion Michelle McCool was scheduled to defend her title against Mickie James at the TLC event. The two became close rivals when in November the two were made respective captains for opposing teams in a five-on-five Survivor Series elimination match at Survivor Series. Three days before Survivor Series, James was shown a video package featuring McCool performing a parody of "Old McDonald Had a Farm", calling her rival "Piggy James" and sending James into tears. At Survivor Series, James and Melina won the elimination match for their team, last eliminating McCool. On the December 4 episode of SmackDown, James defeated Beth Phoenix and Natalya in a triple threat match to become the number one contender for the WWE Women's Championship.

== Event ==
Other on-screen personnel
Role:	Name:
English commentators	Michael Cole
English commentators	Jerry Lawler
English commentators	Matt Striker
Spanish commentators	Carlos Cabrera
Spanish commentators	Hugo Savinovich
Interviewer	Josh Mathews
Ring announcers	Tony Chimel
Ring announcers	Justin Roberts
Referees	Charles Robinson
Referees	John Cone
Referees	Scott Armstrong
Referees	Chad Patton

Prior to the show airing live on pay-per-view, R-Truth defeated CM Punk in a dark match.

=== Preliminary matches ===
The opening match was the ladder match for the ECW Championship between Christian and Shelton Benjamin. As the match went underway, both men retrieved a ladder. As Christian tried to retrieve the belt, Benjamin pulled him down; Christian later reciprocated, but as he made another attempt to climb, Benjamin forced the ladder on top of him. Benjamin climbed a ladder at ringside and performed a senton bomb onto Christian. As the action returned to the ring, the two countered the other's attempts at climbing the ladder. As Christian climbed, Benjamin threw him off the ladder with a powerslam. As both men recovered, Christian propped a ladder up in the corner but Benjamin executed a stinger splash on him against the ladder. As the match progressed, Christian climbed the ladder, and grabbed the belt but Benjamin pulled the ladder out from underneath him and executed a powerbomb into a ladder. In the end, Christian executed a frog splash on Benjamin, who was laid out on a ladder bridged between the apron and the broadcast table, causing the ladder to break in half. Christian retrieved the belt to retain the title.

Next, John Morrison defended the WWE Intercontinental Championship against Drew McIntyre. McIntyre gained control by applying various submission holds. Morrison gained the advantage by executing a tilt-a-whirl DDT. Outside the ring, Morrison executed a Flying Chuck. Morrison executed a Starship Pain but the count was stopped when the referee saw McIntyre's foot was under the ropes. Later in the match, McIntyre raked Morrison's eyes and executed a Future Shock to win the title.

After that, Michelle McCool defended the WWE Women's Championship against Mickie James. The match started with both competitors holding the advantage until the match ended up outside the ring. With Layla distracting James, McCool threw her into the barricade. McCool executed a big boot to retain the title.

=== Main event matches ===
The next match was a Tables match for the WWE Championship between John Cena and Sheamus. After countering attempts to put each other through a table, Cena fought with Sheamus in the ring until Sheamus executed the Brogue Kick. Sheamus tried to put Cena through a table in the corner but Cena countered. Cena attempted an Attitude Adjustment from the top rope but Sheamus countered and the two fought on the top rope. The match ended when Sheamus fell off the top rope to the outside but Cena fell through the table, meaning Sheamus won the title.

The next match was a Chairs match for the World Heavyweight Championship between The Undertaker and Batista. Batista retrieved a chair and The Undertaker attempted a big boot, but missed and Batista attacked The Undertaker with a chair. After multiple chair shots, The Undertaker executed a leg drop on Batista, who was hung on the apron. Back in the ring, Batista executed a superplex on The Undertaker. Batista attempted a Batista Bomb, but The Undertaker countered with a back body drop onto a chair. The Undertaker executed Snake eyes and Old School on Batista. Batista executed a spear, a spinebuster on a chair and threw The Undertaker into a chair wedged between the middle and top turnbuckles. Batista pushed The Undertaker into the referee, executed a low blow and a chair shot to win the match. As Batista celebrated his win, Theodore Long walked out and restarted the match. The Undertaker hit Batista with a chair and executed a Tombstone Piledriver to retain the title.

Next, Kofi Kingston faced Randy Orton in a singles match. During the match, the two used many submission holds. While Orton was outside the ring, Kingston attempted a diving crossbody but Orton countered with a dropkick and targeted his abdomen. Kingston executed Trouble in Paradise but Orton touched the ropes, voiding the pin. Orton executed an RKO on Kingston to win the match.

The main event was the Tables, Ladders, and Chairs match for the Unified WWE Tag Team Championship, between JeriShow (Chris Jericho and Big Show) and D-Generation X (Shawn Michaels and Triple H). Jericho fought with Michaels while Triple H fought Big Show. While Big Show and Triple H fought near the stage, Michaels dominated Jericho in the ring until Jericho countered. Jericho helped Big Show attack Triple H but Michaels attacked Jericho with a chair. Big Show executed a chokeslam on Michaels onto Triple H through a table positioned against the barricade. Big Show destroyed all the ladders and Jericho climbed on Big Show's shoulders in an attempt to retrieve the belts but Michaels executed Sweet Chin Music on Big Show, knocking Jericho into a table outside the ring. Triple H held half a ladder as Michaels retrieved the belts to win the match and the titles.

== Reception ==
The event received positive reviews from critics with praise being put on the shock endings and title changes and on the quality of the matches. John Canton of TJR Wrestling Reviews gave the entire event a 7.5 rating out of 10, and his highest rated match was the ECW Championship ladder match which was rated 4 stars out of 5.

== Aftermath ==
A second TLC event was held the following year, thus establishing TLC: Tables, Ladders & Chairs as an annual event for the promotion. The 2009 event would also be the only one to feature the ECW brand, as it was disbanded in February 2010. It was also the only TLC event held before the original World Tag Team Championship was deactivated in August 2010 in favor of the WWE Tag Team Championship; since WrestleMania 25 in April, both titles were held and defended together across all brands as the Unified WWE Tag Team Championship. It would also be the only TLC event held before the original WWE Women's Championship was deactivated in September 2010 in favor of the WWE Divas Championship.

The annual event continued to be held in December, except for the 2017 event, which occurred in October. TLC was discontinued after the 2020 event, as an event was scheduled for 2021, however, it was canceled so that WWE could focus on a new event called Day 1, taking place on New Year's Day 2022. After six years, TLC was reinstated in 2026 for WWE's developmental brand, NXT.

== Results ==
No.	Results	Stipulations	Times
1^{D}	R-Truth defeated CM Punk (with Luke Gallows)	Singles match	8:12
2	Christian (c) defeated Shelton Benjamin	Ladder match for the ECW Championship	18:04
3	Drew McIntyre defeated John Morrison (c)	Singles match for the WWE Intercontinental Championship	10:19
4	Michelle McCool (c) (with Layla) defeated Mickie James	Singles match for the WWE Women's Championship	7:31
5	Sheamus defeated John Cena (c)	Tables match for the WWE Championship	16:20
6	The Undertaker (c) defeated Batista	Chairs match for the World Heavyweight Championship	13:14
7	Randy Orton defeated Kofi Kingston	Singles match	13:11
8	D-Generation X (Shawn Michaels and Triple H) defeated Jeri-Show (Chris Jericho and Big Show) (c)	Tables, Ladders, and Chairs match for the Unified WWE Tag Team Championship (Note: The name "Unified WWE Tag Team Championship" referred to both the World Tag Team Championship and WWE Tag Team Championship being held and defended together, although both titles remained independently active.)	22:50
(c) / – the champion(s) heading into the match; D / – this was a dark match

== Notes ==
b. ^ Batista originally defeated The Undertaker after a low blow and a chair shot but Teddy Long came out and ordered the match to be restarted as blatant fouls were not legal but chair shots were.
