= Hell in a Cell (2009) =

World Wrestling Entertainment pay-per-view event

- Promotional poster featuring The Undertaker and the Hell in a Cell structure
- Promotion: World Wrestling Entertainment
- Brand(s): Raw; SmackDown; ECW
- Date: October 4, 2009
- City: Newark, New Jersey
- Venue: Prudential Center
- Attendance: 12,356
- Buy rate: 283,000

Pay-per-view chronology
← Previous; Breaking Point	Next → Bragging Rights

Hell in a Cell chronology
← Previous; First	Next → 2010

The 2009 Hell in a Cell was a professional wrestling pay-per-view (PPV) event produced by World Wrestling Entertainment (WWE). It was the inaugural Hell in a Cell event and took place on October 4, 2009, at the Prudential Center in Newark, New Jersey, held for wrestlers from the promotion's Raw, SmackDown, and ECW brand divisions. The event centered on the men's Hell in a Cell match, a 20-foot-high roofed steel cage that surrounds the ring and ringside area with no countouts or disqualifications and the only way to win is by pinfall or submission in the ring.

There were eight matches scheduled on the event's card, as well as one dark match that occurred before the live broadcast. The event featured what was known as a supercard, which featured more than one main event match. The three main event matches were contested as Hell in a Cell matches. These included D-Generation X (Triple H and Shawn Michaels) defeating The Legacy (Cody Rhodes and Ted DiBiase), which was the final match on the card, Randy Orton defeating John Cena to win Raw's WWE Championship, and The Undertaker defeating CM Punk to win SmackDown's World Heavyweight Championship.

Other matches featured on the event were John Morrison defending SmackDown's Intercontinental Championship against Dolph Ziggler, Mickie James versus Alicia Fox for Raw's Divas Championship, Unified WWE Tag Team Champions Jeri-Show (Chris Jericho and Big Show) versus Batista and Rey Mysterio, Drew McIntyre facing R-Truth, and a triple threat match for Raw's United States Championship among Kofi Kingston, The Miz, and Jack Swagger.

The Hell in a Cell event replaced No Mercy as the annual October PPV. This would be the only Hell in a Cell event to feature the ECW brand in any capacity, as it was disbanded in February 2010. The pay-per-view drew 283,000 buys, up from the 261,000 buys that No Mercy 2008 received. This event would also be the final time Jim Ross called as part of WWE's commentary team full-time for a pay-per-view event and began part-time commentary onwards.

== Production ==
=== Background ===
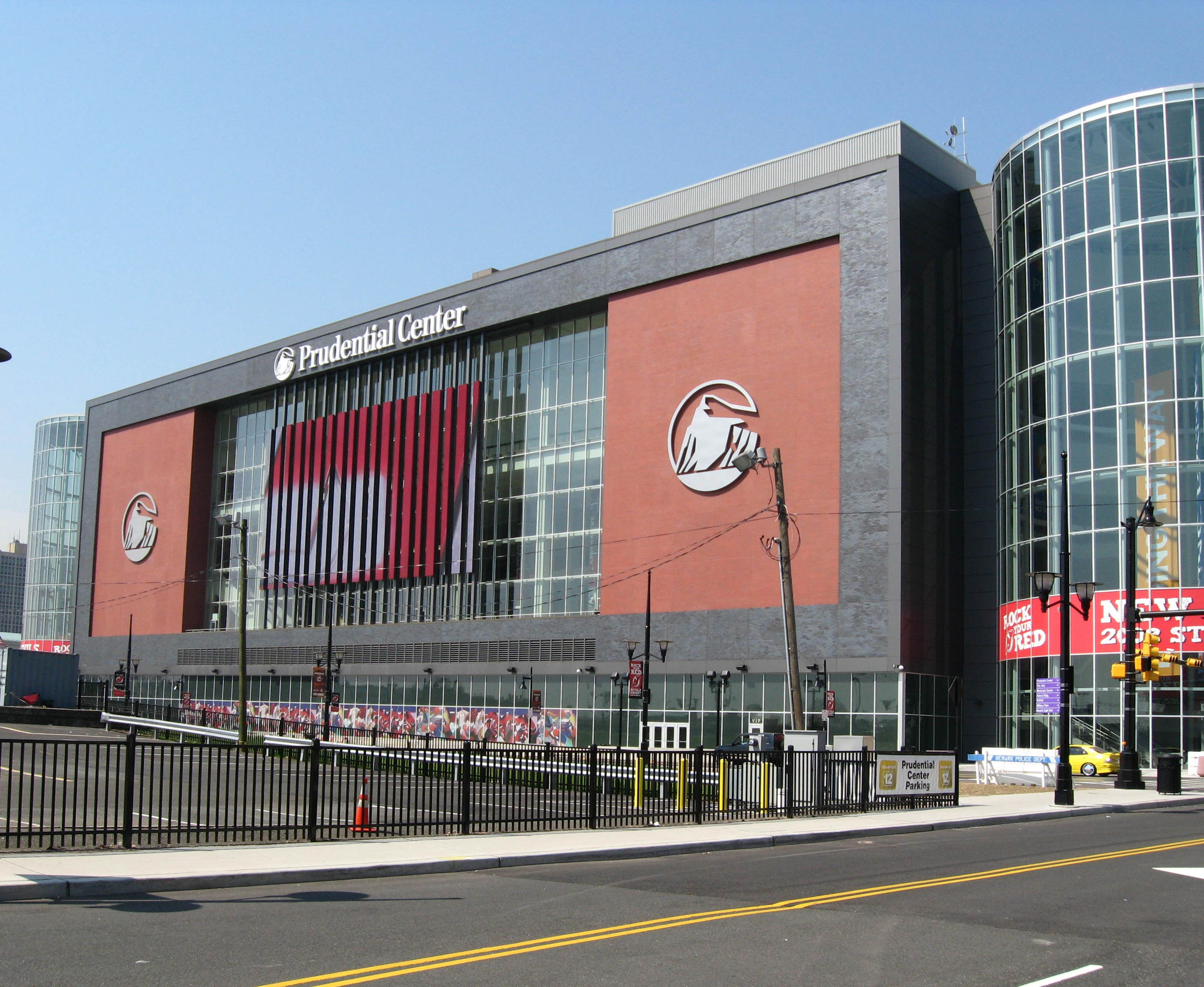
The inaugural Hell in a Cell event was held at the Prudential Center in Newark, New Jersey.

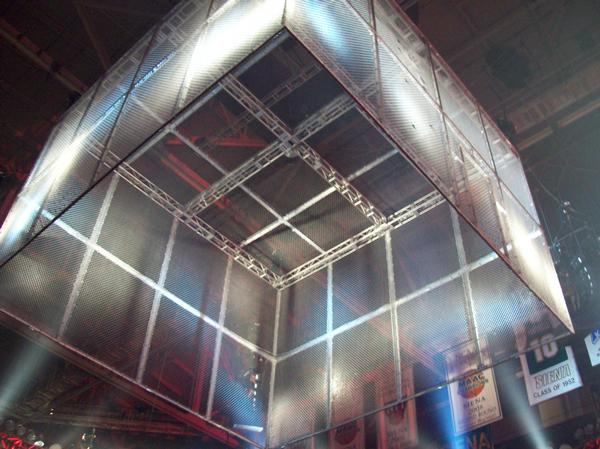
The Hell in a Cell cage, a 20-foot high roofed structure that surrounds the ring and ringside area; each main event match was contested inside Hell in a Cell.

In early 2009, the professional wrestling promotion World Wrestling Entertainment (WWE) ran a poll on their official website in which fans could vote on the name of that year's October pay-per-view (PPV) event, which would replace the previously annual October PPV, No Mercy. Hell in a Cell was chosen over No Escape, Locked Up, and Rage in a Cage. The concept of the event came from WWE's established Hell in a Cell match, in which competitors fight inside a 20-foot-high roofed cell structure surrounding the ring and ringside area and the main event match would be contested under the Hell in a Cell stipulation. The inaugural Hell in a Cell event was scheduled to be held on October 4, 2009, at the Prudential Center in Newark, New Jersey and it featured wrestlers from the Raw, SmackDown, and ECW brands.

=== Storylines ===
The event included matches that resulted from scripted storylines. Results were predetermined by WWE's writers on the Raw, SmackDown, and ECW brands, while storylines were produced on WWE's weekly television shows, Raw, SmackDown, and ECW.

The main rivalry from the Raw brand was between D-Generation X (Triple H and Shawn Michaels) and The Legacy (Ted DiBiase and Cody Rhodes). Triple H and Shawn Michaels reformed their tag team unit D-Generation X at SummerSlam in a winning effort against Ted DiBiase and Cody Rhodes (collectively known as The Legacy). Their confrontations continued in the coming weeks before leading to a Falls Count Anywhere match that can only be won by submission at Breaking Point, which saw The Legacy get the victory. After one last major brawl between both teams the following night on Raw, it was announced later that night they would face one more time at the event in a Hell in a Cell match of their own.

The main rivalry from the SmackDown brand was between the World Heavyweight Champion CM Punk and The Undertaker. At Breaking Point, the two faced off in a submission match. Despite Undertaker successfully forcing Punk to submit with his Hell's Gate submission hold, SmackDown General Manager Theodore Long declared that the hold had been banned "a long time ago" by Vickie Guerrero and restarted the match. Reminiscent of the Montreal Screwjob, Punk later locked in his Anaconda vise hold and despite Undertaker never submitting, Punk was declared the winner when referee Scott Armstrong called for the bell to be rang. On the September 18 episode of SmackDown, Undertaker kidnapped Long inside his limousine. Released from a casket a week later, a startled Long announced a reversal on the Hell's Gate ban and that a rematch between the two would take place at the event in a Hell in a Cell match.

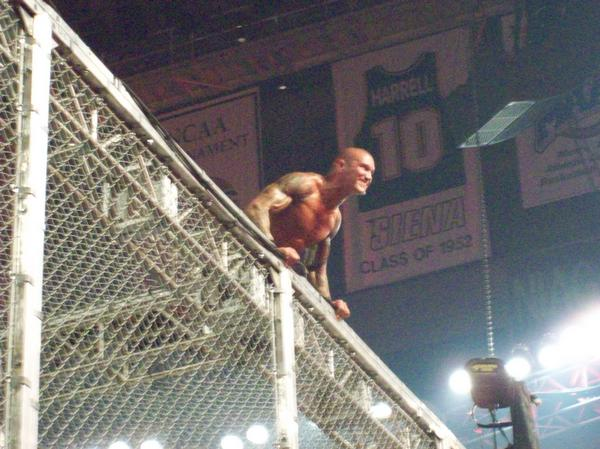
The rivalry between Randy Orton (pictured) and John Cena led to a confrontation around the cell structure at the September 28 episode of Raw.

Another rivalry from the Raw brand was between John Cena and Randy Orton over their vying for the WWE Championship; at SummerSlam, Orton had retained the title in a controversial fashion that saw him intentionally get disqualified before ultimately retaining the title; WWE owner, Vince McMahon, announced a rematch at Breaking Point; an "I Quit" match which was won by Cena. The following night on Raw, Orton received a rematch for the title from the night's guest matchmaker Trish Stratus at Hell in a Cell in the eponymous match. On the final Raw, Cena competed in a gauntlet match against Chris Jericho, Big Show, and Orton. After Cena defeated Jericho and Show by disqualification, Orton came out as the last opponent. However, the cell began to lower as Cena tried to stop Orton from escaping. Orton almost managed to get free but was too late, becoming trapped inside the cell with Cena. As Orton attempted to get away, Cena blocked the door and the two brawled. Orton managed to get out and began climbing to the top of the cell as Cena chased after him. With nowhere left to run, Cena attacked Orton with an Attitude Adjustment on top of the cell to close the show.

On the final SmackDown before Hell in a Cell, DX, Undertaker, and Cena teamed up to face Legacy, Orton, and Punk in an eight-man tag team match. Undertaker won the match for his team after executing a Tombstone Piledriver on Orton.

Dolph Ziggler continued his pursuit for the WWE Intercontinental Championship that he started in July when he won a triple threat match on the August 27 episode of WWE Superstars against Mike Knox and Finlay to become the number-one contender. A week later on SmackDown, John Morrison defeated Rey Mysterio to become the new Intercontinental Champion. The match between Ziggler and Morrison was originally set to take place at Breaking Point. However, the match was later postponed and subsequently announced to take place at Hell in a Cell instead.

Batista made his return to the company following a torn biceps brachii muscle and joined SmackDown, where he came into immediate conflict with Unified WWE Tag Team Champions Chris Jericho and Big Show. After several confrontations with the team, Batista announced his contention for the titles at Hell in a Cell with partner Rey Mysterio.

== Event ==
Other on-screen personnel
Role:	Name:
Commentators	Michael Cole
Commentators	Jerry Lawler
Commentators	Jim Ross
Commentators	Todd Grisham
Interviewer	Josh Mathews
Ring announcers	Tony Chimel
Ring announcers	Justin Roberts
Referees	Charles Robinson
Referees	John Cone
Referees	Scott Armstrong
Referees	Chad Patton

=== Dark match ===
Before the event went live on pay-per-view, Matt Hardy defeated Mike Knox in a dark match.

=== Preliminary matches ===
The first match was a Hell in a Cell match between CM Punk and The Undertaker for the World Heavyweight Championship. Punk focused on The Undertaker's leg in the early going. Punk hit The Undertaker with a steel chair to score a nearfall. After Punk performed a step-up high knee in the corner, The Undertaker executed a Last Ride to score a near-fall. Punk then attempted to hit The Undertaker with the chair again but The Undertaker countered with a big boot. The Undertaker executed a chokeslam followed by a Tombstone Piledriver to win the title.

The next match featured John Morrison defending the Intercontinental Championship against Dolph Ziggler. Control of the match shifted between both superstars. Morrison missed the Starship Pain in the early part of the match, after which Ziggler dominated until Morrison countered a powerslam attempt into a DDT. Morrison then missed a Flying Chuck, after which Ziggler executed a German suplex. Ziggler attempted to delivered a Zig-Zag, but Morrison held onto the ropes and delivered Starship Pain to retain the title.

Next was the Divas Championship match between defending champion Mickie James and Alicia Fox. James dominated most of the match before countering a bridge attempt by Fox into a Mickie-DDT to score the pinfall and retain the title.

The next match featured Jeri-Show (Chris Jericho and Big Show) taking on Batista and Rey Mysterio for the Unified WWE Tag Team Championship. The challengers dominated the early part of the match, isolating Jericho from his partner. Batista executed a spinebuster on Jericho to score a near-fall, after which Jericho executed a Codebreaker on Batista to score a near-fall. Big Show then performed a chokeslam on Batista but Mysterio broke the pinfall. Batista speared both Jericho and Big Show on the outside. Mysterio then executed a 619 on Big Show but was struck with a Knockout Punch while attempting a West Coast Pop. Big Show then pinned Mysterio to retain the titles.

=== Main event matches ===
The first main event match was a Hell in a Cell match for the WWE Championship between champion John Cena and Randy Orton. Both competitors had control at different points of the match. Cena used the cell to his advantage when he slammed Orton twice into the cell wall. When Cena attempted to slam Orton a third time, the challenger pushed him into the wall instead. Orton then attempted to drive Cena onto the steel steps but Cena bodyslammed the challenger to the outside. Orton then executed his middle-rope DDT for a near-fall. Cena followed with an Attitude Adjustment but Orton kicked out. Orton hit Cena on the neck with a steel chair, followed by a pin attempt which Cena kicked out. Cena applied the STF to Orton but Orton managed to get to the ropes. When Cena attempted another STF, Orton pushed him off, knocking the referee down in the process. Cena applied another STF and Orton tapped out, but the referee was unconscious at the time. After Cena checked on the referee, Orton executed an RKO but Cena kicked out. Orton then delivered a punt kick to win the title.

The next match featured R-Truth against Drew McIntyre. R-Truth executed a dropkick and leg lariat in the early going before McIntyre executed a big boot and a clothesline. McIntyre attempted twice to execute the Future Shock but R-Truth countered each one until McIntyre threw him from the top rope. McIntyre followed with the Future Shock to score the pinfall.

Next was a triple threat match for the United States Championship between champion Kofi Kingston, The Miz, and Jack Swagger. The Miz and Swagger worked together to deliver a double clothesline and double Irish whip to Kingston. The Miz, however, attacked Swagger and executed his signature moves. Swagger hoisted The Miz on his shoulders for an electric chair and Kingston executed a crossbody on The Miz at the same time. Swagger delivered a belly-to-belly suplex on Kingston and covered him, but The Miz broke the pin. Kingston afterwards performed a Boom Drop on Swagger but The Miz broke up that pin too. Swagger attempted a German suplex on Miz but Kingston hit him with the Trouble in Paradise. The Miz then delivered a Skull-Crushing Finale to Kingston, but Swagger put Kingston's foot on the rope. Swagger executed a gutwrench powerbomb on The Miz, after which, Kingston executed another Trouble in Paradise on Swagger. Kingston then pinned The Miz to retain his title.

The final match was a Hell in a Cell tag team match between D-Generation-X (Triple H and Shawn Michaels) and The Legacy (Cody Rhodes and Ted DiBiase). Rhodes and DiBiase attacked DX during their entrance which led to a brawl outside the cage before the match even started. Rhodes delivered a Cross Rhodes on the entrance ramp to Triple H. Legacy then put Michaels inside the cage and locked the door with Triple H outside. Rhodes and DiBiase focused on Michaels' knee, performing knee breakers and ramming it into the steel post. Michaels fought back, delivering an atomic drop, chops and Sweet Chin Music to DiBiase. However, Legacy continued to dominate Michaels as Triple H tried to break the lock with a chair. Triple H then left, seemingly abandoning Michaels, but returned with pliers and opened the door, attacking Rhodes and DiBiase. Triple H then punched DiBiase using a chain and delivered a Pedigree on him, then left him outside the cage and locked the door. Triple H and Michaels finished Rhodes off with a sledgehammer/Sweet Chin Music combination to win the match. After the match, DiBiase entered the ring but was struck with a Sweet Chin Music, thus ending the show as DX celebrated their victory.

== Aftermath ==
=== Raw ===
On the following episode of Raw, John Cena challenged Randy Orton to one final rematch for the WWE Championship at Bragging Rights, this time as a 60-minute Iron Man match. Orton accepted on two conditions: if Cena lost, he would leave Raw and that the match would be anything goes.

=== Future ===
The 2009 Hell in a Cell event was the inaugural event of an annual gimmick pay-per-view for WWE, generally held in October—the only exceptions being the September 2018 event, the June 2021 event, and the June 2022 event. This inaugural event would be the only Hell in a Cell to feature ECW as the brand was disbanded in February 2010. Hell in a Cell was discontinued after the 2022 event, as Chief Content Officer Paul "Triple H" Levesque stated that he wanted to discontinue some of the gimmick events so that the match itself could return to being the culmination of big feuds instead of something that has to be done each year because of the event. Its 2023 slot was replaced by what was to be a revival of King of the Ring in 2023, rebranded as "King and Queen of the Ring", but that was changed to Night of Champions, in turn reviving Night of Champions.

This was the only Hell in a Cell event held before the original World Tag Team Championship was deactivated in August 2010 in favor of the WWE Tag Team Championship; since WrestleMania 25 in April, both titles were held and defended together across all brands as the Unified WWE Tag Team Championship. It would also be the only Hell in a Cell event held before the original WWE Women's Championship was deactivated in September 2010 in favor of the WWE Divas Championship.

== Results ==
No.	Results	Stipulations	Times
1^{D}	Matt Hardy defeated Mike Knox by pinfall	Singles match	06:00
2	The Undertaker defeated CM Punk (c) by pinfall	Hell in a Cell match for the World Heavyweight Championship	10:24
3	John Morrison (c) defeated Dolph Ziggler by pinfall	Singles match for the WWE Intercontinental Championship	15:41
4	Mickie James (c) defeated Alicia Fox by pinfall	Singles match for the WWE Divas Championship	05:20
5	Jeri-Show (Chris Jericho and Big Show) (c) defeated Batista and Rey Mysterio by pinfall	Tag team match for the Unified WWE Tag Team Championship (Note: The name "Unified WWE Tag Team Championship" referred to both the World Tag Team Championship and WWE Tag Team Championship being held and defended together, although both titles remained independently active.)	13:41
6	Randy Orton defeated John Cena (c) by pinfall	Hell in a Cell match for the WWE Championship	21:24
7	Drew McIntyre defeated R-Truth by pinfall	Singles match	04:38
8	Kofi Kingston (c) defeated The Miz and Jack Swagger by pinfall	Triple threat match for the WWE United States Championship	07:53
9	D-Generation X (Triple H and Shawn Michaels) defeated The Legacy (Cody Rhodes and Ted DiBiase) by pinfall	Hell in a Cell match	18:02
(c) / – the champion(s) heading into the match; D / – this was a dark match
