= Night of Champions (2009) =

World Wrestling Entertainment pay-per-view event

- Promotion poster featuring CM Punk holding the World Heavyweight Championship
- Promotion: World Wrestling Entertainment
- Brand(s): Raw; SmackDown; ECW
- Date: July 26, 2009
- City: Philadelphia, Pennsylvania
- Venue: Wachovia Center
- Attendance: 17,774
- Buy rate: 267,000
- Tagline: Every Championship Is on the Line

Pay-per-view chronology
← Previous; The Bash	Next → SummerSlam

Night of Champions chronology
← Previous; 2008	Next → 2010

The 2009 Night of Champions was a professional wrestling pay-per-view (PPV) event produced by World Wrestling Entertainment (WWE). It was the third annual Night of Champions and took place on July 26, 2009, at the Wachovia Center in Philadelphia, Pennsylvania, held for wrestlers from the promotion's Raw, SmackDown, and ECW brand divisions. The theme of the event was that all nine of WWE's active championships at the time were defended.

This was the final Night of Champions to feature the ECW brand and the ECW Championship as the brand was dissolved in February 2010, deactivating the championship along with it.

This show was considered a supercard, which featured more than one main event match. The main event matches featured were: Jeff Hardy defeating CM Punk for SmackDown's World Heavyweight Championship, Randy Orton retaining Raw's WWE Championship against Triple H and John Cena, Mickie James winning Raw's Divas Championship against Maryse, and SmackDown's Intercontinental Champion Rey Mysterio retaining his title against Dolph Ziggler. The undercard, featured Jeri-Show (Chris Jericho and Big Show) defending the Unified WWE Tag Team Championship against The Legacy, Christian defeating Tommy Dreamer for the ECW Championship, Kofi Kingston defending Raw's United States Championship in a six-pack challenge against Montel Vontavious Porter, The Miz, Carlito, Primo, and Jack Swagger, and Michelle McCool defending SmackDown's WWE Women's Championship against Melina. The event had 267,000 buys, down on the 2008 figure of 273,000 buys.

== Production ==
=== Background ===
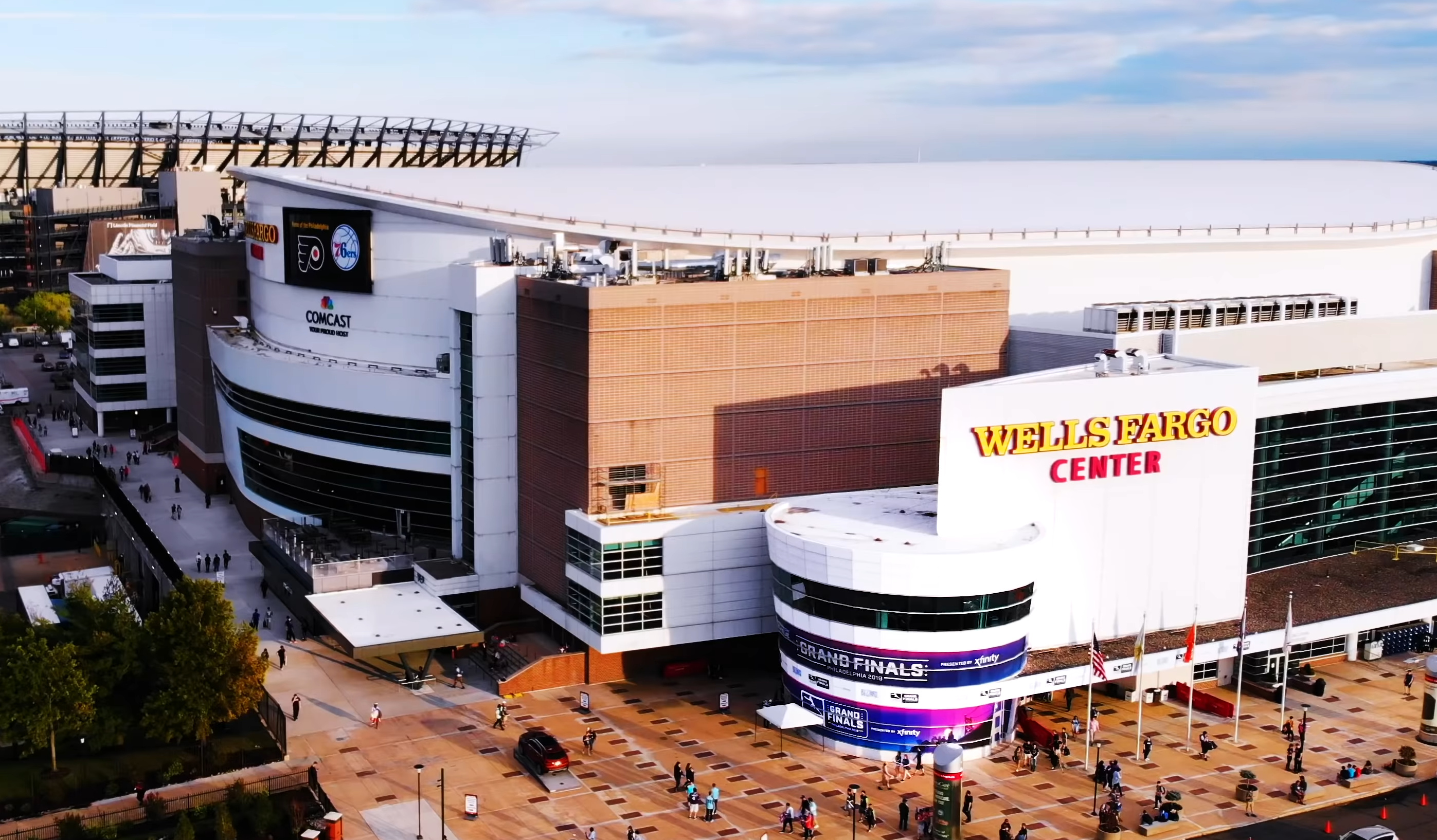
The third annual Night of Champions was held as the Wachovia Center in Philadelphia, Pennsylvania.

Night of Champions is a professional wrestling pay-per-view (PPV) event produced by World Wrestling Entertainment (WWE) since 2007, with the event based around championship matches. The third event was held on July 26, 2009, at the Wachovia Center in Philadelphia, Pennsylvania, which was the originally scheduled date and venue for The Bash (the two shows swapped dates and venues). The event featured wrestlers from the Raw, SmackDown, and ECW brands.

As per the theme of the event, every active championship promoted by WWE at the time was defended. These included the three championships on Raw—the WWE Championship, the United States Championship, and the WWE Divas Championship—the three championships on SmackDown—the World Heavyweight Championship, the Intercontinental Championship, and the WWE Women's Championship—ECW's sole championship—the ECW Championship—and the promotion's two tag team championships—the World Tag Team Championship and WWE Tag Team Championship, which had been unified at WrestleMania 25 in April as the Unified WWE Tag Team Championship, the umbrella term for two titles that were independently active but defended together on any brand. This was the first Night of Champions to feature the Divas Championship, which had been established in July 2008, just after the previous year's event.

=== Storylines ===
Night of Champions featured professional wrestling matches that involved different wrestlers from pre-existing scripted feuds, plots, and storylines that were played out on Raw, Friday Night SmackDown, ECW on Syfy, and WWE Superstars—WWE's television programs. All wrestlers were from WWE's Raw, SmackDown, and ECW brands—a storyline division in which WWE employees are assigned to a television program of the same name.

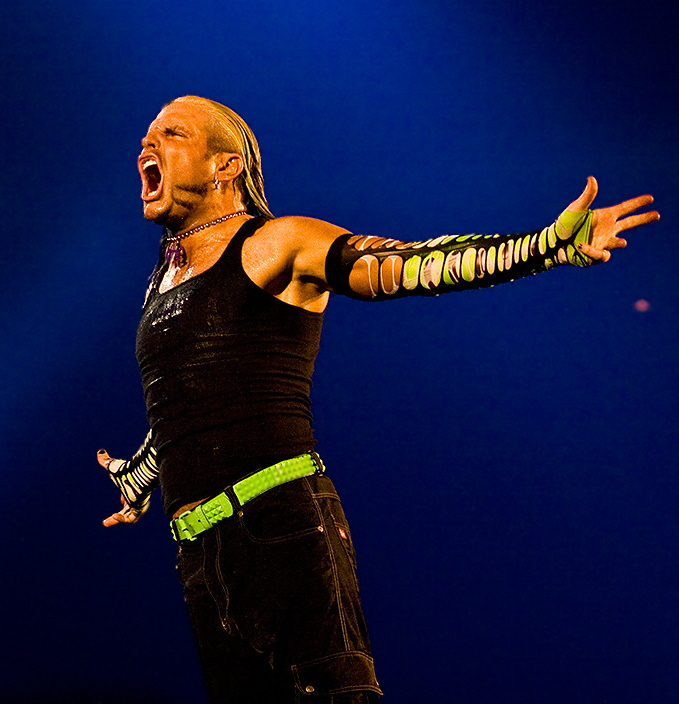
Jeff Hardy defeated CM Punk for SmackDown's World Heavyweight Championship.

The main rivalry from SmackDown heading into Night of Champions was between CM Punk and Jeff Hardy in their conflict over the World Heavyweight Championship. One month prior to the show, at Extreme Rules, Punk invoked the guaranteed title match he earned by winning the Money in the Bank ladder match against Hardy; he defeated him, and won the World Heavyweight title, after Hardy had already defeated Edge in a ladder match to win the championship. Hardy received his rematch against Punk on the June 15 episode of Raw in a triple threat match also involving Edge, who Punk pinned to retain the title after Hardy had hit a Swanton Bomb on him. The two had constant confrontations in the following weeks over the legitimacy of Punk's reign before they met at The Bash in a match for the championship that saw Punk get disqualified for striking the referee, leading to Hardy attacking Punk for what he saw as dodging competition (a title cannot change hands on a disqualification). On the July 2 episode of WWE Superstars, it came to light that Punk had suffered a storyline eye injury. Punk's rebuttal to Hardy's accusation was that he struck the referee due to his inability to clearly see a target. To clear up any dispute on to who the rightful champion was, SmackDown general manager, Theodore Long, announced another match for the World Heavyweight Championship between the two at Night of Champions, which was accepted by both competitors.

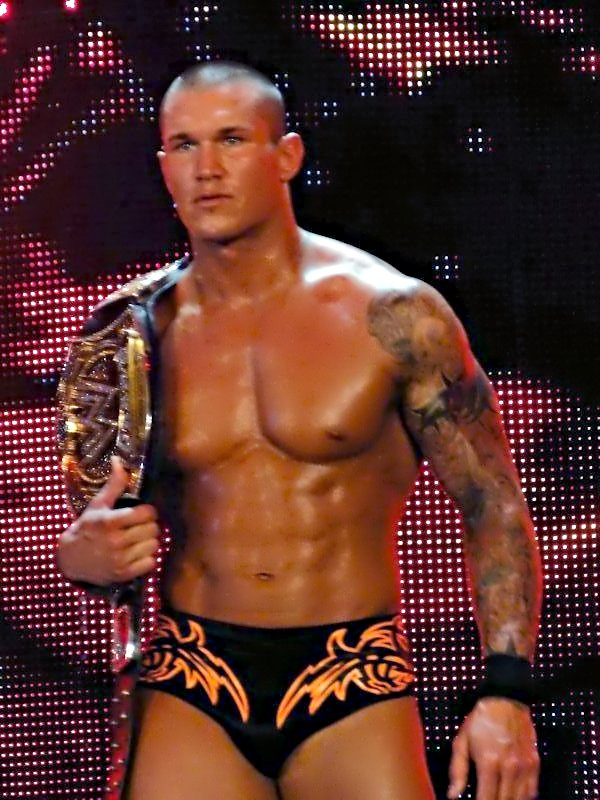
Randy Orton defended Raw's WWE Championship against John Cena and Triple H in a triple threat match.

The Raw brand was represented by Randy Orton defending his WWE Championship. After defeating Triple H in a 3 Stages of Hell match at The Bash, Orton was without a contender for the championship, so on the June 29 episode of Raw, it was announced by the special guest host of the week, as well as onscreen matchmaker, Batista, that the title would be defended at Night of Champions against the winner of a single-elimination tournament. The semifinals commenced that night with Triple H defeating Montel Vontavious Porter (MVP) and John Cena defeating The Miz. Triple H and Cena faced each other on the following week's episode of Raw, only to see Orton's protégés, Cody Rhodes and Ted DiBiase, interfere in the match and attack both men. As a result, it was announced Orton would defend the title against both Triple H and Cena in a triple threat match.

After winning the ECW Championship at Extreme Rules, Tommy Dreamer had been involved in a scripted rivalry with perennial ally, rival, and former ECW Champion, Christian. The former champion was given a chance to get back into the title picture by having a match with Vladimir Kozlov to determine the number one contender. On the July 9 episode of ECW on Syfy, Christian won the match, thus advancing to Night of Champions to challenge Dreamer.

Edge and Chris Jericho had won the Unified WWE Tag Team Championship at The Bash in a triple threat tag team match from incumbent champions, The Colóns, and Cody Rhodes and Ted DiBiase (collectively known as The Legacy). Two weeks following the event on the July 6 episode of Raw, the special guest host for the night, Ted DiBiase (Sr.), announced that The Legacy would challenge Edge and Jericho for the titles. In the coming week on Raw, it came to light that Edge had legitimately torn his Achilles tendon, which required surgery, as well as sidelining Edge for a projected several months. It was announced on the next week's episode of Raw, Jericho had a storyline contractual loophole, which allowed him to choose a new partner to hold the titles with him if Edge were to be injured, thus allowing him to defend the titles at Night of Champions.

Following a defense of the WWE Intercontinental Championship on the July 10 episode of SmackDown, Rey Mysterio was attacked by Dolph Ziggler. The following week on WWE Superstars, Mysterio and Ziggler had a verbal confrontation over what transpired, leading to the announcement of Mysterio defending the Intercontinental title against Ziggler at the pay-per-view.

As part of the 2009 WWE Draft on April 13, Maryse was drafted to the Raw brand, and in the process, the Divas Championship became exclusive to Raw. She made her first appearance as part of the brand on April 27, teaming with Beth Phoenix, Rosa Mendes, and Jillian Hall in a loss to Santina Marella, Mickie James, Brie Bella, and Kelly Kelly. Maryse then began feuding with James after she cost James a number one contender's battle royal, which was eventually won by Kelly Kelly, by spraying hairspray in her eyes. On the July 13 episode of Raw after the Divas Championship match between Maryse and Mickie James was announced for Night of Champions, the team of Maryse, Rosa Mendes, and Alicia Fox defeated Kelly Kelly, Gail Kim, and Mickie James in a Six Divas Summer Swimsuit Spectacular tag match, in which Maryse pinned James. The feud would escalate the following week on Raw, whereby Mickie James would have a confrontation with The Miz, whereby she had her face sprayed by Maryse afterwards.

== Event ==
Other on-screen personnel
Role:	Name:
English commentators	Michael Cole
English commentators	Jerry Lawler
English commentators	Matt Striker
Spanish commentators	Carlos Cabrera
Spanish commentators	Hugo Savinovich
Interviewer	Josh Mathews
Ring announcers	Tony Chimel
Ring announcers	Justin Roberts
Referees	Charles Robinson
Referees	John Cone
Referees	Scott Armstrong
Referees	Chad Patton

=== Pre-show ===
Prior to the show airing live on pay-per-view, the fans in attendance were shown a dark match pitting Shad Gaspard and JTG (collectively known as Cryme Tyme) against Tyson Kidd and David Hart Smith with Natalya in their corner (the three are known as The Hart Dynasty); Gaspard scored his team the victory, pinning Kidd to the mat following an STO.

=== Preliminary matches ===
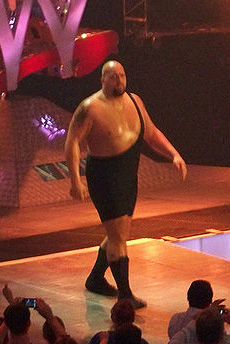
Big Show was revealed as Chris Jericho's partner to hold the Unified WWE Tag Team Championship.

The actual pay-per-view began with Chris Jericho and his mystery partner defending the Unified WWE Tag Team Championship against The Legacy (Cody Rhodes and Ted DiBiase). It was revealed his partner was Big Show, who was originally supposed to be in the six pack challenge for the United States Championship later in the night. Big Show started the match taking advantage of his size on his opponents before tagging in his partner, who was double-teamed by the challengers. The match ended when Jericho caught DiBiase with the Codebreaker, which led to Big Show placing a camel clutch on DiBiase, causing DiBiase to submit to retain the titles.

Following was Tommy Dreamer defending the ECW Championship against Christian. The match was fought at a quick pace with both men being able to counter the others attempt at offense. The action made its way out of the arena and to the floor of the arena as Christian threw the champion into the commentator's table. He made his way back into the ring in an attempted a dive onto Dreamer, who managed to dodge his opponent, who made his way onto the edge of the ring to execute a senton bomb onto his prone opponent on the floor. Once both competitors returned to the ring, they continued to counter each other's moves until Dreamer attempted to deliver a DDT, only to have Christian deliver a Killswitch to pin his opponent and win his second ECW Championship.

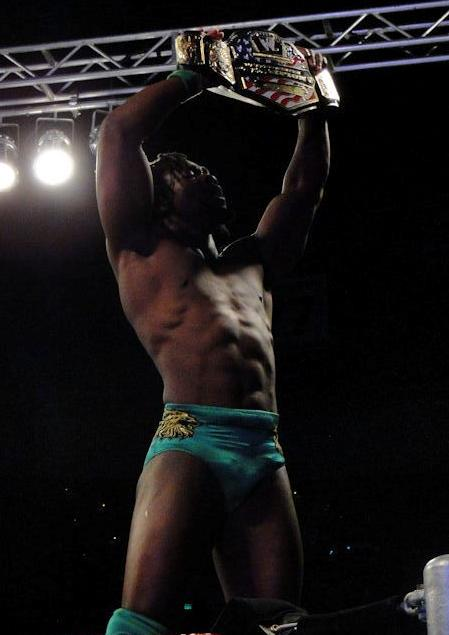
Kofi Kingston retained Raw's United States Championship.

The next title to be defended was Kofi Kingston's WWE United States Championship against Jack Swagger, Montel Vontavious Porter (MVP), Carlito, The Miz, and Primo who was replacing Big Show. The match maintained a fast pace with each wrestler making multiple attempts to pin someone. The end of the match came when Carlito performed a Backstabber on Primo. Kingston was behind his challenger in time to perform the Trouble in Paradise to the back of Carlito's head, leading to a pinfall victory.

The bout for the WWE Women's Championship was next between Michelle McCool and Melina. As Melina made her way to the ring performing her signature split to enter, the champion dropkicked the challenger to the floor of the arena, starting an aggressively-fought match. The match spent a portion of time on the floor with McCool holding Melina on the barricade, dropping her on her face on the structure with a DDT. The match continued with both women trading knee strikes and kicks. McCool caught Melina by the shoulders as she went for a pin to retain her championship.

=== Main event matches ===
Triple H was one of the two challengers for Raw's WWE Championship.

The first main event of the evening was the WWE Championship match between Randy Orton, Triple H, and John Cena. The match started with Orton attempting to move away from the challengers in an attempt to let both of the fight each other; this was followed by Triple H and Cena following the champion outside of the ring. The three men took turns brawling with one another until Orton was dropped to the floor with a double suplex from his opponents. Triple H hit Orton with a spinebuster; he went to pin Cena only to have Orton grab him by the leg, and pull him out of the ring, throwing him into the commentator's table. Cena interjected himself into a fight between all three on the table, throwing Orton into the crowd. As Orton recovered and returned to the ring, he was thrown out while Cena caught Triple H in the middle of the ring with the STF in an attempt to make him submit. Orton made his way back into the ring in an attempt to punt Cena while he had Triple H in the hold; Cena quickly dodged, only to be taken down by the champion. This was followed by Orton stomping down on both of his opponents. Once both challengers recovered, Triple H took down Orton with a Sharpshooter while Cena also applied a crossface hold. Orton proceeded to tap out, only for the referee to declare the match would continue, as he couldn't decide who won the match. Orton's protégés, Rhodes and DiBiase, interfered to assault the challengers. As Cena was looking to hit Rhodes with the Attitude Adjustment, Orton hit Cena with an RKO, leading to a pin on Cena.

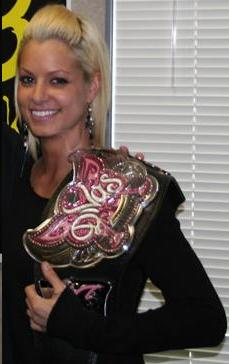
Maryse as Raw's Divas Champion.

Next, Maryse defended the WWE Divas Championship against Mickie James. The match centered around Maryse keeping her distance from James before descending to the floor in an attempt to use a can of hair spray to unleash onto the challenger's eyes; James snatched away the can to use it herself. The referee caught James and grabbed it away from her. The match returned to the ring as Maryse went to finish the match with the French Kiss only to have James counter with her Mickie-DT to pin Maryse and win the title.

In the penultimate match, Rey Mysterio defended the WWE Intercontinental Championship against Dolph Ziggler. Ziggler gained an early advantage by muscling his opponent into the turnbuckle with a powerbomb. In attempt to ground his opponent, Ziggler locked Mysterio in a headlock and rode him into the mat. Mysterio managed to escape his opponent's onslaught by connecting with a kick to his opponent. He ascended the top turnbuckle in an attempt to dive on his opponent, who countered with a dropkick. The challenger ascended the turnbuckle himself with Mysterio on his shoulder and performed a gutbuster off the second rope. After an attempt to pin him, Mysterio retaliated by hitting the 619 and a body press to pin the challenger and retain the title.

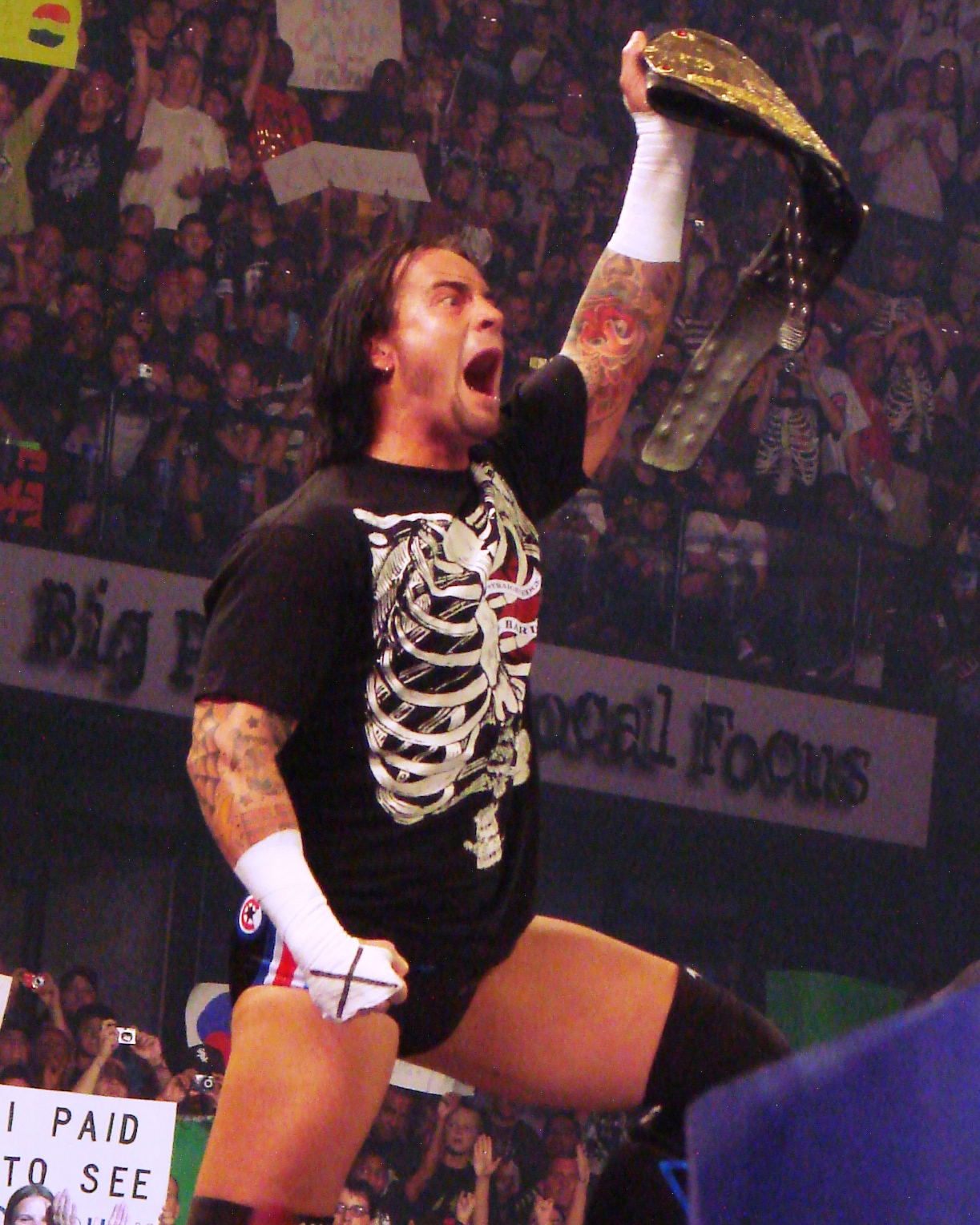
CM Punk lost SmackDown's World Heavyweight Championship to Jeff Hardy.

In the final match, CM Punk defended the World Heavyweight Championship against Jeff Hardy. Punk dominated the challenger early with a series of kicks and armlocks before Hardy escaped to the floor. Punk performed a suicide dive on Hardy, only to crash as his opponent moved away only to have Hardy go for a dive of his own and Punk reciprocate with his own dodge. The champion made his way back to the ring in the hopes of the referee declaring him the winner via countout, the act of a wrestler failing to appear in the ring for the referee's count of 10; Hardy made his way back in the ring by nine. A frustrated Punk continued his assault with knees before Hardy countered with a Whisper in the Wind followed by a pin attempt. Punk escaped the pin with a riding dragon sleeper for a submission attempt. Hardy escaped with some offense before ascending the top turnbuckle and attempting with his finishing maneuver, the Swanton Bomb, only to have the champion lift his knees up, driving them into Hardy's back. Punk exploited his advantage, and hit Hardy with the GTS. He went for the pin, only to have Hardy respond by the referee's count of two. Punk decided to leave the ring at that time in hopes of getting counted out, which would allow him to retain his championship. Hardy headed him off on the entrance ramp, and threw him in the ring. Once both men were back in the ring, Punk made one more attempt at the GTS only to have the challenger counter with the Twist of Fate. He then attempted the Swanton Bomb again, which fully connected for Hardy to pin Punk, winning the World Heavyweight Championship for the second time, his third World Championship overall.

== Reception ==
The event had 267,000 buys, down on the 2008's Night of Champions figure of 273,000 buys. With over 17,000 fans in hand, Night of Champions received mixed reviews from fans and critics. Most of the praise comes in the form of the World Heavyweight title match. Wade Keller of Pro Wrestling Torch gave overall credit for all participants in the World title match, specifically Punk's work as a heel and the ending, which was seen as a surprise due to the rumor circulating that Hardy would be taking time off imminently. Dave Meltzer of the Wrestling Observer Newsletter reviewed Punk's monologue, calling it "very good". Canadian Online Explorer writer Brian Elliott reviewed the show, saying nothing was "of ill-note... (no, not even the Divas Championship match)"; like with other reviews, the World title match was his match of the night, rating it 7/10. Another match that received praise was the Intercontinental title match, which was described as "strong" by reviewers with the biggest problem, as pointed out by Meltzer, that Ziggler was "not as well-known yet with the crowd". The Women's Championship match was well received by the fans and considered the best Divas match of 2009 by many women's wrestling supporters.

The show received some mild criticisms. While many people were left intrigued with the double submission portion of the WWE Championship match, James Caldwell of the Torch was especially critical of the moment by questioning the logic behind the confusion of the referee and commentators; the consensus gave the match a good review until the end, which Caldwell called "lame".

== Aftermath ==
=== Raw ===
The following night on Raw, it was announced by the night's guest host, Shaquille O'Neal, that Randy Orton would defend his title next at SummerSlam against the winner of the Beat the Clock challenge, with the one wrestler out of five- Mark Henry, Montel Vontavious Porter, Triple H, Jack Swagger, and John Cena- who defeats their respective opponent the fastest would challenge Orton for the title. Henry set a pace at 6:49, which went unbroken for three straight competitors until Cena wrestled, which had him beat the time, thus going to SummerSlam.

=== SmackDown ===
CM Punk, after showing sportsmanship towards Jeff Hardy after their match, came out to address Hardy following a title defense against John Morrison on the July 31 episode of SmackDown, only to assault him before he invoked his contractual rematch clause the following week, only to lose due to interference from Matt Hardy, the match's guest enforcer, leading to Punk assaulting the champion. Theodore Long announced immediately following the match that there would be one more between the two at SummerSlam, which was announced to be a Tables, Ladders, and Chairs match (TLC).

Dolph Ziggler continued his crusade for the Intercontinental title by attacking Rey Mysterio during a match with Mike Knox. This led to Ziggler regaining his contendership the following night on SmackDown by defeating Knox, R-Truth, and Finlay in a fatal four-way match.

=== Future ===
This was the final Night of Champions event to feature the ECW Championship, as well as the ECW brand, as the brand was disbanded in February 2010, deactivating the championship along with it. It was also the final Night of Champions to feature the World Tag Team Championship, as it was deactivated in August 2010 in favor of continuing the WWE Tag Team Championship, which dropped the "unified" moniker.

== Results ==
No.	Results	Stipulations	Times
1^{D}	Cryme Tyme (Shad Gaspard and JTG) defeated The Hart Dynasty (Tyson Kidd and David Hart Smith)	Tag team match	5:13
2	Jeri-Show (Chris Jericho and Big Show) (c) defeated The Legacy (Cody Rhodes and Ted DiBiase)	Tag team match for the Unified WWE Tag Team Championship (Note: The name "Unified WWE Tag Team Championship" referred to both the World Tag Team Championship and WWE Tag Team Championship being held and defended together, although both titles remained independently active.)	9:32
3	Christian defeated Tommy Dreamer (c)	Singles match for the ECW Championship	8:28
4	Kofi Kingston (c) defeated Montel Vontavious Porter, The Miz, Carlito, Primo, and Jack Swagger	Six-Pack Challenge for the WWE United States Championship	8:35
5	Michelle McCool (c) defeated Melina	Singles match for the WWE Women's Championship	6:12
6	Randy Orton (c) defeated Triple H and John Cena	Triple Threat match for the WWE Championship	22:19
7	Mickie James defeated Maryse (c)	Singles match for the WWE Divas Championship	8:36
8	Rey Mysterio (c) defeated Dolph Ziggler (with Maria)	Singles match for the WWE Intercontinental Championship	14:20
9	Jeff Hardy defeated CM Punk (c)	Singles match for the World Heavyweight Championship	14:56
(c) / – the champion(s) heading into the match; D / – this was a dark match
