= The Legacy (professional wrestling) =

Professional wrestling stable

- WWE merchandise logo

Stable
- Leader: Randy Orton
- Members: Cody Rhodes; Ted DiBiase Jr. Manu; Sim Snuka
- Name(s): The Legacy; Priceless (Rhodes and DiBiase)
- Debut: June 29, 2008 (as a Tag Team); September 1, 2008 (Pre-Legacy Alliance) (Note: During this time, Priceless (Rhodes and DiBiase) and later joined by Manu, did not have a name for their group and went by with their own names. They were looking to impress and get approval of Orton to form a partnership for months before officially forming in December 2008); December 1, 2008 (officially as Legacy)
- Years active: 2008–2010; 2011

The Legacy was a villainous professional wrestling stable in the professional wrestling promotion World Wrestling Entertainment (WWE), who competed on its Raw brand from 2008 to 2010. Originally, The Legacy was a group led by Randy Orton that contained the tag team of Cody Rhodes and Ted DiBiase. Two other wrestlers, Manu and Sim Snuka, were briefly members of the stable as well. The concept behind the group was that each member was a multi-generational wrestler. The name The Legacy was a reference to their extensive family histories in wrestling.

In June 2008, Rhodes and DiBiase first formed an alliance after winning the World Tag Team Championship at Night of Champions, when Rhodes betrayed his original partner, Hardcore Holly, to align with DiBiase. Soon after, the pair tried to earn Orton's respect, which they eventually did. Together, the team helped Orton win the 2009 Royal Rumble match, giving Orton an opportunity to compete in the main event at WrestleMania 25. The team also wrestled together in a tag team match to win the WWE Championship for Orton at Backlash. The team helped Orton win the championship three times over the course of 2009 despite a tumultuous relationship which saw Orton often physically attacking his two students. This led to Orton splitting from the group in early 2010. Rhodes and DiBiase eventually turned on each other in their match with Orton at WrestleMania XXVI.

== Concept ==
The concept behind the group was that each member is a multi-generational wrestler. The name of the faction, The Legacy, referred to their extensive family histories in wrestling. Randy Orton's father (Bob Orton, Jr.), uncle (Barry Orton) and grandfather (Bob Orton Sr.) were all professional wrestlers. Ted DiBiase Jr., meanwhile, takes his name from his father, (Ted DiBiase) who wrestled before him along with both his grandparents (adoptive grandfather, Mike DiBiase and grandmother Helen Hild). Cody Rhodes followed in the footsteps of his father (Dusty Rhodes), his brother (Dustin Rhodes), and his two uncles (Jerry Sags and Fred Ottman), who preceded him in the business. Due to their status as multi-generation wrestlers, all the members of The Legacy believed themselves to be superior to the other wrestlers in WWE, in storyline.

The Legacy has been compared to the former WWE faction Evolution of which Orton was a member, but Rhodes and DiBiase have said that they saw the comparison as an opportunity to prove themselves and show their potential.

== History ==
=== Formation and storyline with Orton (2008–2009) ===
Ted DiBiase made his first WWE appearance on the May 26 episode of Raw, in which he claimed that he and a mystery partner would take the World Tag Team Championship from Cody Rhodes and Hardcore Holly. However, at the Night of Champions event in June, Rhodes betrayed Holly and won the championship with DiBiase. In August, the duo lost the championship to Batista and John Cena but won back a week later.

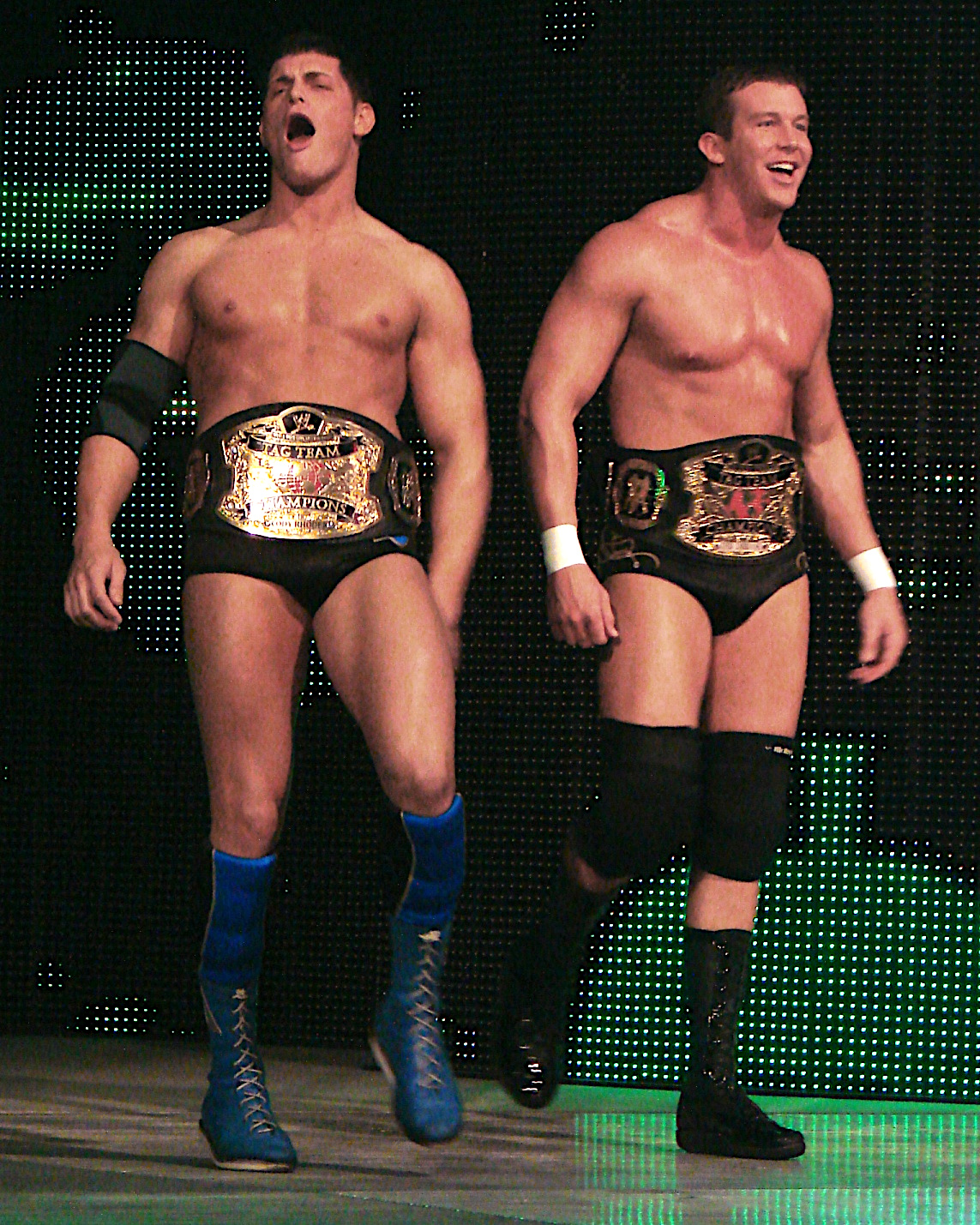
Rhodes and DiBiase were two-time World Tag Team Champions

In September, Randy Orton, who at the time was injured, made an appearance on Raw, where he criticized all the champions, mocking Rhodes and DiBiase for allowing their title belts to be stolen by Cryme Tyme (Shad Gaspard and JTG). The two responded by assaulting Cryme Tyme and introducing Manu (son of Afa, nephew of Sika) as their new member at Unforgiven. This did little to impress Orton, so later that evening Rhodes, DiBiase, and Manu assaulted World Heavyweight Champion CM Punk as Orton confronted him backstage. This allowed Orton to punt Punk in the head, removing him from his championship match, and gaining Orton's respect.

When Orton was well enough to wrestle, Punk demanded a match with him, which he won via disqualification when DiBiase interfered. As a result, Orton punted DiBiase in the head, putting him out of action; this storyline was put in place in order for DiBiase to take time off to film The Marine 2. Orton then invited Rhodes and Manu to form a group with him called The Legacy, and used them to help in his rivalry with Batista leading to a three-on-two handicap match where Batista was put out of action for four months.

After Sim Snuka, the son of Jimmy Snuka, also expressed interest in joining the group, Orton made him qualify through a series of tests which Manu failed that same week. On the January 5 episode of Raw, Snuka and Rhodes won a tag team match against Cryme Tyme. Before the match, Orton informed them that they had to win the match in order to be part of the group. After the match, Orton explained that since Snuka did not pick up the pinfall, he was out of the group. The following week, Manu and Snuka informed Rhodes that they were intending to assault Orton and had brought someone to help them do so, giving Rhodes an ultimatum to choose a side. When Rhodes refused to side with them, Manu and Snuka brought out a returning Ted DiBiase to aid them, and tried to assault Orton with Rhodes seemingly ready to attack Orton as well. Instead DiBiase joined The Legacy, attacking Manu and Snuka, and forgiving Orton for attacking him.

=== Orton's championship reigns and various feuds (2009–2010) ===
Orton won the 2009 Royal Rumble match by last eliminating Triple H, who had just eliminated DiBiase and Rhodes. Throughout Orton's subsequent feud with the McMahon family, DiBiase and Rhodes assisted in various attacks on Shane McMahon and Triple H. Although Orton failed to capture the WWE Championship from Triple H at WrestleMania 25, The Legacy defeated Batista, McMahon, and Triple H at Backlash three weeks later, earning Orton the title per the match stipulation. After Orton lost the championship to Batista at Extreme Rules, The Legacy attacked and injured Batista in storyline on the following night's Raw, leading to the title being vacated and Orton regaining it in a fatal four-way match the following week.

At The Bash pay-per-view, signs of dissention between DiBiase and Orton appeared when DiBiase argued with Orton backstage. Despite this, DiBiase and Rhodes both helped Orton retain his WWE Championship later that night against Triple H. This tension was later expanded upon when DiBiase's father booked Orton and DiBiase in a match on Raw while he was in charge; Orton won the match but the team showed solidarity later in the same evening by interfering in a WWE Championship contender match between Triple H and Cena, leading to it being ruled a no contest. This made the subsequent match at Night of Champions a triple threat contest. Similar tensions arose briefly in the group late in August when Rhodes' father, Dusty, booked Orton and Rhodes in a match on Raw. It quickly turned out to be a ruse with Dusty's intention to allow The Legacy to attack Cena, who was special guest referee. Despite the four standing tall together, Orton quickly gave an RKO to Dusty which angered Rhodes though he would fall in line.

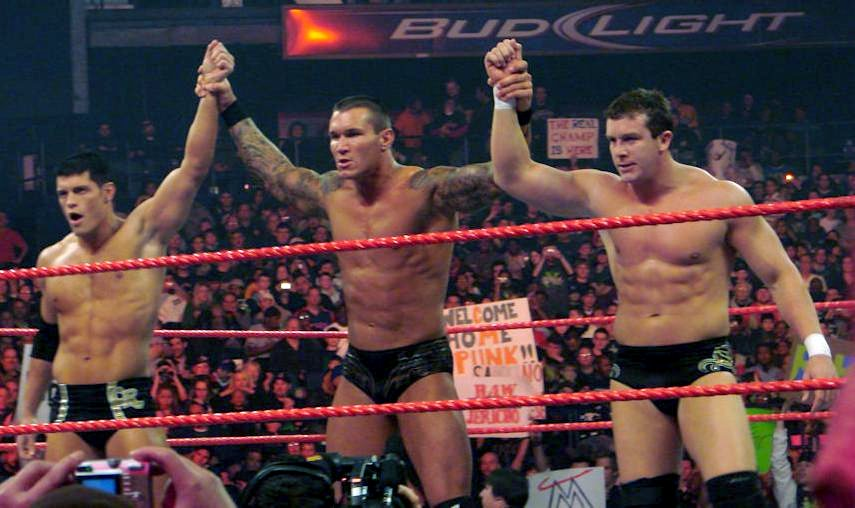
Rhodes, Orton and DiBiase in 2009

After Orton retained the championship in July's Night of Champions, the team worked together again to prevent Triple H from receiving a rematch against Orton by slowing his Beat The Clock Challenge match, so that he did not have the quickest time and did not receive a championship match. As a result, Triple H refocused his attention on Rhodes and DiBiase, losing to them in a handicap match, and reforming D-Generation X (DX) with Shawn Michaels. Rhodes and DiBiase faced DX at SummerSlam, but lost the match, although they later defeated DX in a Submissions Count Anywhere match at the Breaking Point pay-per-view, using a combined figure-four leg lock and Million Dollar Dream on Shawn Michaels. The following month DX defeated DiBiase and Rhodes at the Hell in a Cell pay-per-view by locking DiBiase out of the cell and double-teaming Rhodes, just as the team had done to Michaels earlier in the match. Meanwhile, Orton retained the title against Cena at SummerSlam after the match was restarted a number of times to prevent Orton sneaking a win through disqualification and countout, with an unknown fan, later revealed to be Ted's brother Brett, eventually coming in from the crowd to attack the referee and cause a distraction which helped Orton retain. At Breaking Point, Orton lost the WWE Championship to John Cena in an "I Quit" match only to win it the next month in a Hell in a Cell match at the eponymous event. At Bragging Rights, Orton lost the championship to Cena in a 60-minute Iron Man match with the stipulation that it would be the last championship match between the two. Earlier in the evening Rhodes appeared on Team Raw in a match that pitted Raw against SmackDown in a tag team match. He was seen backstage blaming Kofi Kingston for the loss and in retaliation Kingston ran out to chase away Rhodes and DiBiase when they interfered in the Iron Man match.

Kingston won a return match against Chris Jericho the following night, who had pinned him at Bragging Rights, but after the match Orton attacked him. Kingston retaliated by vandalising a NASCAR that Rhodes and DiBiase bought Orton to cheer him up after his title loss. The rivalry continued when, at Madison Square Garden, Orton attacked Hall of Famer Roddy Piper, but just before he could deliver a punt Kingston came out and attacked Orton, making him bleed and leg dropping him through a table. Kofi headed a team at November's Survivor Series against Orton's team of The Legacy, William Regal and CM Punk which ended with Kingston eliminating Punk and then Orton in quick succession to become the sole survivor while Christian eliminated Rhodes and DiBiase earlier. The next night on Raw Jesse Ventura announced the contender for the WWE Championship would be determined by a series of matches contested for by wrestlers who had never held the title before. Despite this Orton managed to persuade Ventura to allow him into the tournament by defeating Evan Bourne while Rhodes and DiBiase defeated Cryme Tyme to make it through but in the Battle Royal final were eliminated by Mark Henry while Orton was pulled over by Kingston, who held on to the ropes after Orton had thrown him out. Orton defeated Kingston the following week on November 30's Raw after he was attacked from behind by both Rhodes and DiBiase separately, while Kingston took a return win the following week after guest referee Mark Cuban made a fast count leading to a rubber match at the TLC: Tables, Ladders and Chairs pay-per-view, which Orton won.

=== Cracks and dissolution (2010) ===
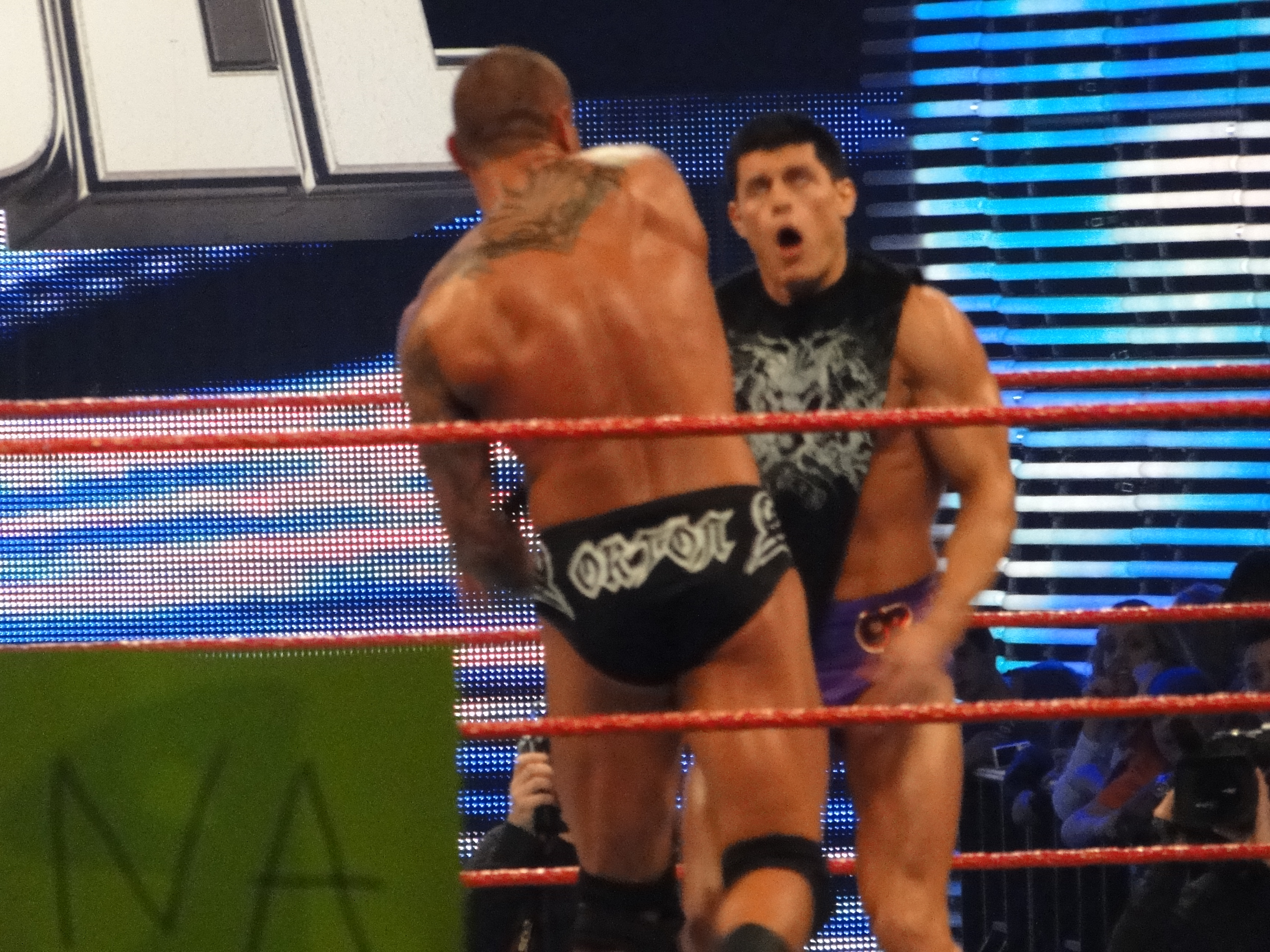
Orton attacking Rhodes after being disqualified at the Royal Rumble pay-per-view in January 2010

On the January 11, 2010, episode of Raw, guest host Mike Tyson announced that the winner of a triple threat match later that night between Orton, Kingston, and John Cena would challenge Sheamus for the WWE Championship at the Royal Rumble. Orton ultimately won with the help of The Legacy, who attacked Cena and Kingston. At the Royal Rumble, Orton failed to win the championship when he was disqualified when Rhodes tried to interfere. After the match, Orton attacked Rhodes and DiBiase, who attempted to aid Rhodes. On the February 15 episode of Raw, Orton took on Sheamus in a non-title rematch, but was again disqualified after Rhodes and DiBiase interfered. During the WWE Championship Elimination Chamber match at the Elimination Chamber pay-per-view, in which both Orton and DiBiase participated, Rhodes passed a pipe to DiBiase. DiBiase hit Orton with it, and eliminated him.

The next night on Raw, The Legacy participated in a six-man tag team match against Kingston, Yoshi Tatsu, and Evan Bourne, designed to show their unity, but Orton attacked Rhodes and DiBiase and the following week on Raw, Rhodes and DiBiase attacked Orton in retaliation, although Orton was able to fight them off. Orton's split from the group was cemented when he lost a handicap match against both Rhodes and DiBiase on Raw and showed increasing signs of becoming a fan favorite. This led to a Triple Threat Match between all three members at WrestleMania XXVI, where Rhodes and DiBiase proclaimed neither minded not winning so long as Orton was pinned, but in the match Orton pinned DiBiase. DiBiase and Rhodes attacked each other during the match, ending the duo, and Rhodes was punted by Orton and taken out of action for approximately a month. The split was confirmed when Rhodes moved to SmackDown brand during the 2010 WWE Supplemental Draft.

=== Brief reunions (2011) ===
Cody Rhodes reformed his alliance with Ted DiBiase on the May 20 episode of SmackDown, and the duo went on to feud with Sin Cara and Daniel Bryan. In August, Rhodes attacked DiBiase after DiBiase lost a match to Orton, ending their alliance. On the September 16 episode of SmackDown, DiBiase disguised himself as a member of the audience by wearing a paper bag – part of Rhodes's gimmick – to allow him to attack Rhodes. This led to DiBiase unsuccessfully challenging Rhodes for Rhodes's Intercontinental Championship at Night of Champions. Rhodes and Orton spent much of the latter part of 2011 feuding with each other.

== Members ==
*	Founding member (Tag Team)
**	Founding member (Stable)
L	Leader

Member		Joined	Left
Cody Rhodes	*/**	June 29, 2008	March 28, 2010
Ted DiBiase Jr.	*	June 29, 2008; January 12, 2009	November 3, 2008; March 28, 2010
Manu	**	September 7, 2008	December 29, 2008
Randy Orton	**/L	September 1, 2008	February 22, 2010
Sim Snuka		December 29, 2008	January 5, 2009

== Championships and accomplishments ==
- World Wrestling Entertainment
  - WWE Championship (3 times) - Randy Orton
  - World Tag Team Championship (2 times) - Cody Rhodes and Ted DiBiase
  - Royal Rumble (2009) - Randy Orton
