= WWE The Bash =

2009 World Wrestling Entertainment pay-per-view event

The Bash
- Promotion poster featuring Batista
- Promotion: World Wrestling Entertainment
- Brand(s): Raw; SmackDown; ECW
- Date: June 28, 2009
- City: Sacramento, California
- Venue: ARCO Arena
- Attendance: 11,946
- Buy rate: 178,000

Pay-per-view chronology
← Previous; Extreme Rules	Next → Night of Champions

The Great American Bash chronology
← Previous; 2008	Next → 2012

The Bash was a 2009 professional wrestling pay-per-view (PPV) event produced by World Wrestling Entertainment (WWE). It was WWE's sixth annual Great American Bash—truncated as The Bash—and 20th overall. The event took place on June 28, 2009, at the ARCO Arena in Sacramento, California, and was held for wrestlers from the promotion's Raw, SmackDown, and ECW brand divisions.

There were eight matches on the event's card. The card for the event was a supercard due to it having three main attraction bouts. This included: Randy Orton defeating Triple H in a Three Stages of Hell match to retain Raw's WWE Championship, SmackDown's World Heavyweight Champion CM Punk getting disqualified against Jeff Hardy, and John Cena defeating The Miz in the first official encounter between the two. The undercard for the show featured five matches: ECW Champion Tommy Dreamer defending his title against Christian, Jack Swagger, Finlay, and Mark Henry in a Championship Scramble match, Chris Jericho wagering SmackDown's Intercontinental Championship against Rey Mysterio's mask, Dolph Ziggler versus The Great Khali in a No Disqualification match, The Colóns defending the Unified WWE Tag Team Championship against The Legacy and Edge and Chris Jericho, and Michelle McCool challenging Melina for SmackDown's WWE Women's Championship.

The event had 178,000 pay-per-view buys, down on The Great American Bash 2008 figure of 196,000 buys. This was the final event in The Great American Bash series to be held as a PPV event, as it was replaced by Fatal 4-Way in 2010. It was also the only Great American Bash to be truncated as "The Bash", as in 2012, the event was revived as a special episode of SmackDown, which returned to using the full name of "The Great American Bash". Eight years later in 2020, the event was again revived, becoming an annual event for WWE's developmental brand, NXT; since its revival for NXT, it has been held as a television special of NXT as well as a livestreaming event.

== Production ==
=== Background ===
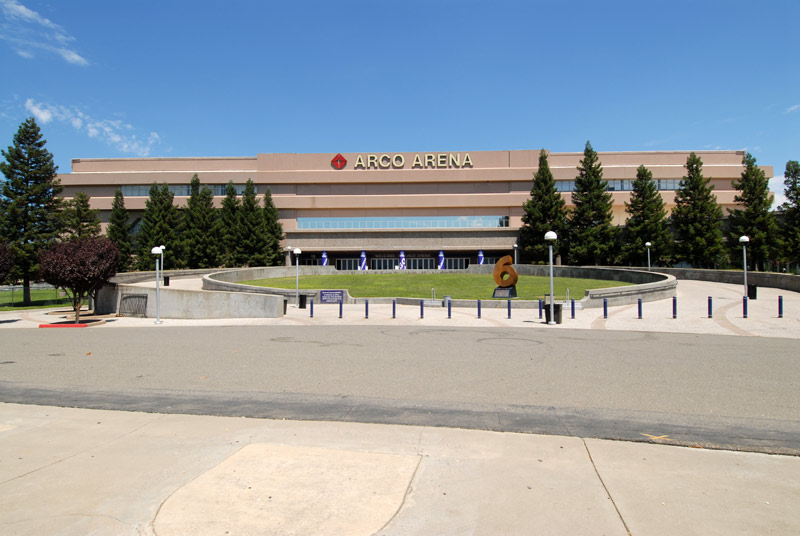
WWE's sixth annual Great American Bash, which was truncated as The Bash, was held at the ARCO Arena in Sacramento, California.

The Great American Bash is a professional wrestling event established in 1985, held during the summer. Following World Wrestling Entertainment's (WWE) acquisition of World Championship Wrestling (WCW) in March 2001, WWE revived The Great American Bash as its own annual pay-per-view (PPV) event in 2004. WWE's sixth annual Great American Bash, and 20th overall, was truncated as The Bash. It took place on June 28, 2009, at the ARCO Arena in Sacramento, California, which was the original date and venue for Night of Champions (which was moved to July 26), and featured wrestlers from the Raw, SmackDown, and ECW brands.

=== Storylines ===
The event included matches that resulted from scripted storylines. Results were predetermined by WWE's writers on the Raw, SmackDown, and ECW brands, while storylines were produced on WWE's weekly television shows, Monday Night Raw, Friday Night SmackDown, ECW, and WWE Superstars.

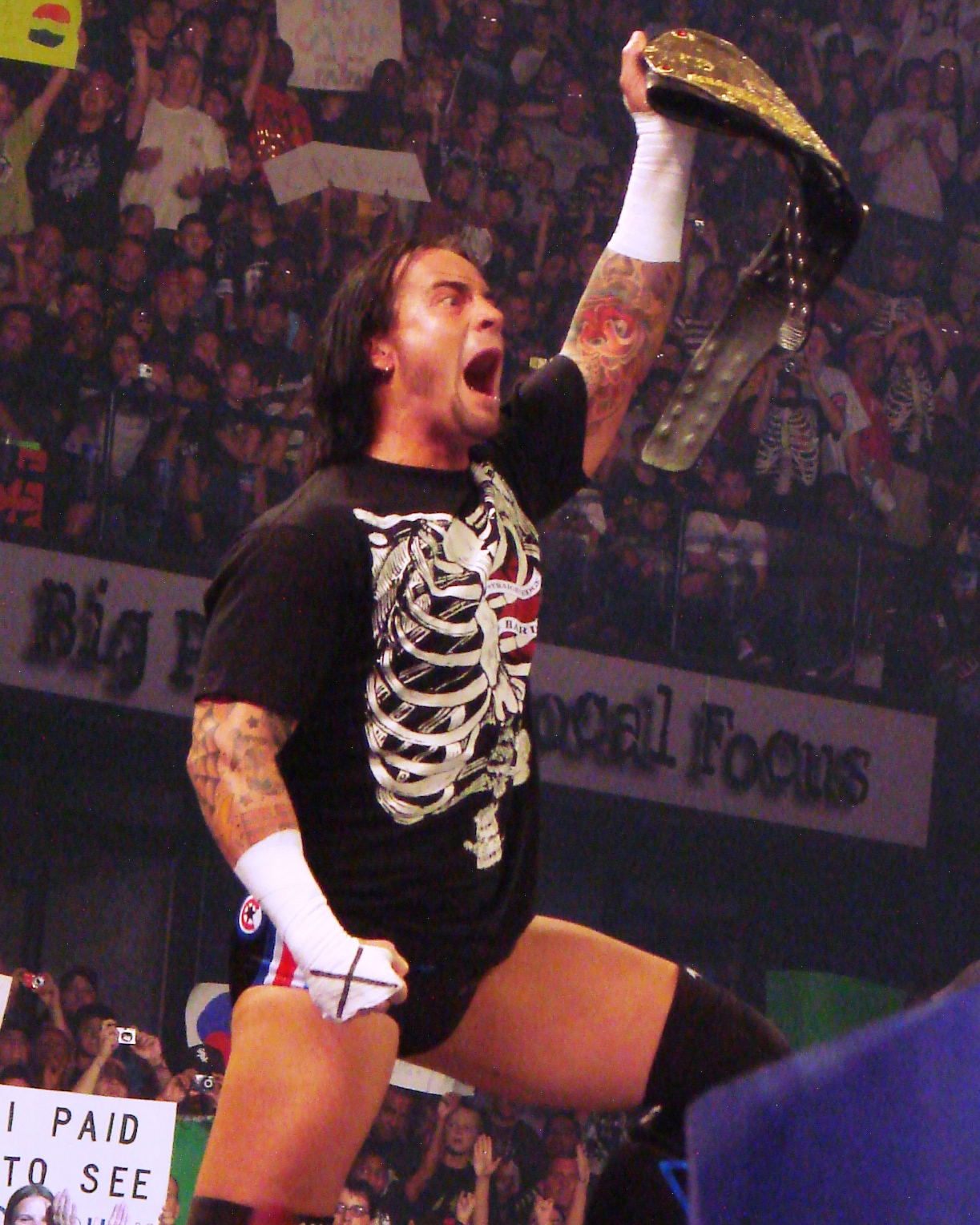
CM Punk defended SmackDown's World Heavyweight Championship against Jeff Hardy.

Three weeks after Extreme Rules, CM Punk cashed in his Money in the Bank contract and defeated Jeff Hardy to win the World Heavyweight Championship, after Hardy had already defeated Edge in a ladder match to win the title. On the following episode of SmackDown, both Hardy and Edge demanded rematches, but SmackDown General Manager Theodore Long then announced a number one contender's match between the two to determine who would face Punk for the championship. The match ended in a no-contest after Punk interfered, resulting in Long making a triple threat match between the three men for the World Heavyweight Championship on the June 15 episode of Raw, where Punk would retain the title by pinning Edge after Hardy had performed a Swanton Bomb on him. Punk and Hardy had tense confrontations in the coming weeks, leading to Theodore Long making a championship match between the two for the Bash.

After winning the WWE Championship at Extreme Rules, Batista was assaulted the next night on Raw by former champion, Randy Orton, and Legacy (Cody Rhodes & Ted Dibiase Jr.) incapacitating Batista and leading to him vacating his title due to a legitimate tear in his Biceps brachii muscle. The next week on Raw, a fatal four-way match was held to determine the new champion, which featured Orton, Triple H, John Cena, and The Big Show. Orton won the match, and it was later announced by WWE Chairman, Vince McMahon, that the next man to face Orton for the title would be the winner of a 10-man battle royal; Triple H won the match, and became the number one contender. It was also announced on this episode of Raw by storyline owner, Donald Trump, that the title would be defended the next week on Raw between the two in a Last Man Standing match, where the winner would go into The Bash with the title, defending against the other. The match ended in a draw when neither man was able to answer the referee's ten-count; Orton retained the championship as a result. Later in the show, Mr. McMahon acquired Raw back from Trump with his first act back in control being to change the match between Orton and Triple H at The Bash to a Three Stages of Hell match, consisting of a singles match, Falls Count Anywhere, and a stretcher match for the first, second, and third falls respectively.

For the two months before the event, Christian, Tommy Dreamer, and Jack Swagger had been in constant conflict with each other over the ECW Championship with Christian defeating Swagger at Backlash and Judgment Day, and Dreamer defeating both at Extreme Rules. In the wake of their conflict, Finlay inserted himself into the rivalry on the June 16 episode of ECW by attacking all three men. It was announced following the program that the four wrestlers, along with Mark Henry, would participate in a Championship Scramble match at The Bash.

After Rey Mysterio retained the Intercontinental Championship against Chris Jericho at Judgment Day, Jericho had begun a moral crusade, accusing Mysterio of being dishonest to the fans for wearing his mask, not showing his true face; he assaulted him after posing as a fan in the crowd wearing one of Mysterio's masks. This led to another match between the two at Extreme Rules, in which Jericho won the title in a No Holds Barred match by removing Mysterio's mask. On the June 15 episode of Raw, Mysterio received his rematch against Jericho, but failed to win. On the June 19 episode of SmackDown, it was announced that the Intercontinental title would be defended at The Bash in a match where if Mysterio were to lose, he would remove his mask.

Since being drafted to Raw in April, The Miz had been making challenges to John Cena. These were generally made after Cena either had been injured or was already in a match, leading to The Miz claiming victory by forfeit. This would continue until The Miz accumulated a record of 7–0. After some confrontations, as well as an ambush by The Miz with a steel chair as a weapon, on the June 22 episode of Raw, it was announced Cena and The Miz would officially meet in a match at The Bash.

== Event ==
Other on-screen personnel
Role:	Name:
English commentators	Michael Cole (Raw)
English commentators	Jerry Lawler (Raw)
English commentators	Jim Ross (SmackDown)
English commentators	Todd Grisham (SmackDown)
English commentators	Matt Striker (ECW)
English commentators	Josh Mathews (ECW)
Spanish commentators	Carlos Cabrera
Spanish commentators	Hugo Savinovich
Interviewer	Josh Mathews
Ring announcer	Lilian Garcia (Raw)
Ring announcer	Justin Roberts (SmackDown)
Ring announcer	Tony Chimel (ECW)
Referees	Charles Robinson
Referees	Mike Chioda
Referees	Scott Armstrong
Referees	Jack Doan
Referees	Marty Elias
Referees	Chad Patton

=== Dark match ===
Prior to the show airing live on pay-per-view, the crowd in attendance was shown an untelevised match pitting R-Truth against Shelton Benjamin, which saw the former defeat the latter by pinfall.

=== Preliminary matches ===
The event began with the ECW Championship Scramble match. The match began with two wrestlers competing for three minutes with another wrestler entering every three minutes thereafter; when a wrestler scored a decision over another, they were declared the interim champion, and only lost the distinction if another wrestler scored a decision after them. Whoever was the interim champion as the time limit expired would be named the official champion. The first two competitors were Christian and Jack Swagger before the entrance of Finlay. Swagger became the first interim champion by pinning Finlay with a roll-up; Finlay retaliated with a Celtic Cross to Swagger. When incumbent champion Tommy Dreamer and Mark Henry entered the match, Henry became the interim title holder by pinning Dreamer after a World's Strongest Slam, only to have Swagger become interim champion by pinning Henry following a Swagger Bomb. As the time limit was set to expire, Dreamer executed a DDT on Christian to remain champion. As the final minute of the match progressed, Dreamer spent the time preventing the four other men from scoring a decision to win the match and retain the title.

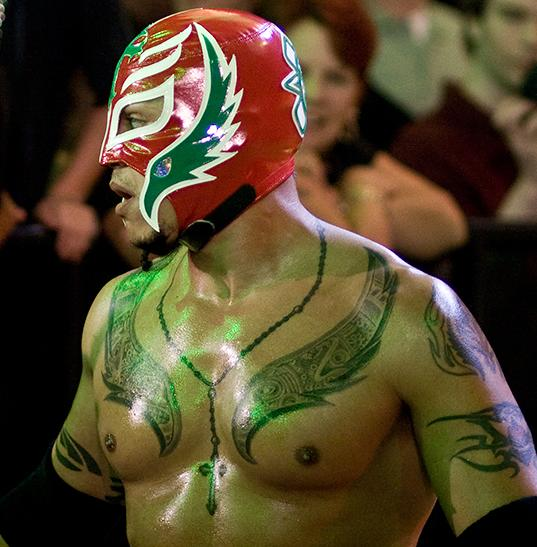
Rey Mysterio defeated Chris Jericho for his second Interconintental Championship; he also retained his right to wear his mask.

Chris Jericho and Rey Mysterio's match for the Intercontinental Championship followed; the contest was kept at a fast pace, leading to Jericho going to the floor of the arena surrounding the ring to have his opponent deliver a seated senton. As the move also damaged Mysterio, Jericho gained control, whipping the challenger into the barricade before returning the action to the ring; Mysterio regained his momentum to take down Jericho with an Arabian press. The match continued with both men countering each other's signature maneuvers in attempts to score a pin. Mysterio gained the upper hand by dropkicking the champion onto the bottom rope in an attempt to execute the 619; once connected, Jericho quickly applied his submission hold, the Walls of Jericho; Mysterio struggled out of the position, leading to an exchange of surprise pin attempts. The match came to an end when Jericho attempted to remove his opponent's mask, only to see another one in its place, leading to Mysterio taking advantage of the confusion by executing 619 again before performing a springboard splash to pin his opponent, winning the title and retaining his mask.

Third on the card was the No Disqualification match between Dolph Ziggler and The Great Khali. The match quickly went to the arena floor with both men trying to gain control of a steel chair to use as a weapon. Kane made his return in this match by assaulting Khali with the chair before Ziggler made a pin to win the match.

The next match was between The Colóns (Carlito and Primo) and The Legacy (Cody Rhodes and Ted DiBiase) for the Unified WWE Tag Team Championship. As the match was about to proceed, after being pressured by Vince McMahon to improve the quality of SmackDown, Theodore Long announced another team would be inserted into the match, making it a triple threat match; the team would be Chris Jericho and Edge. The match centered around The Colóns and The Legacy isolating themselves for the most part before Edge managed to tag himself into the match as Carlito went to pin Rhodes after the Backstabber, but due to Edge tagging in, the match continued for Edge to deliver a spear to Carlito, pinning him to win the titles.

Melina next defended the WWE Women's Championship against Michelle McCool. The match focused around McCool attacking her opponent's leg with her associate, Alicia Fox, inhibiting Melina. As the champion went to attempt a body scissors, McCool delivered a Faith Breaker for the pinfall victory, winning the title.

=== Main event matches ===
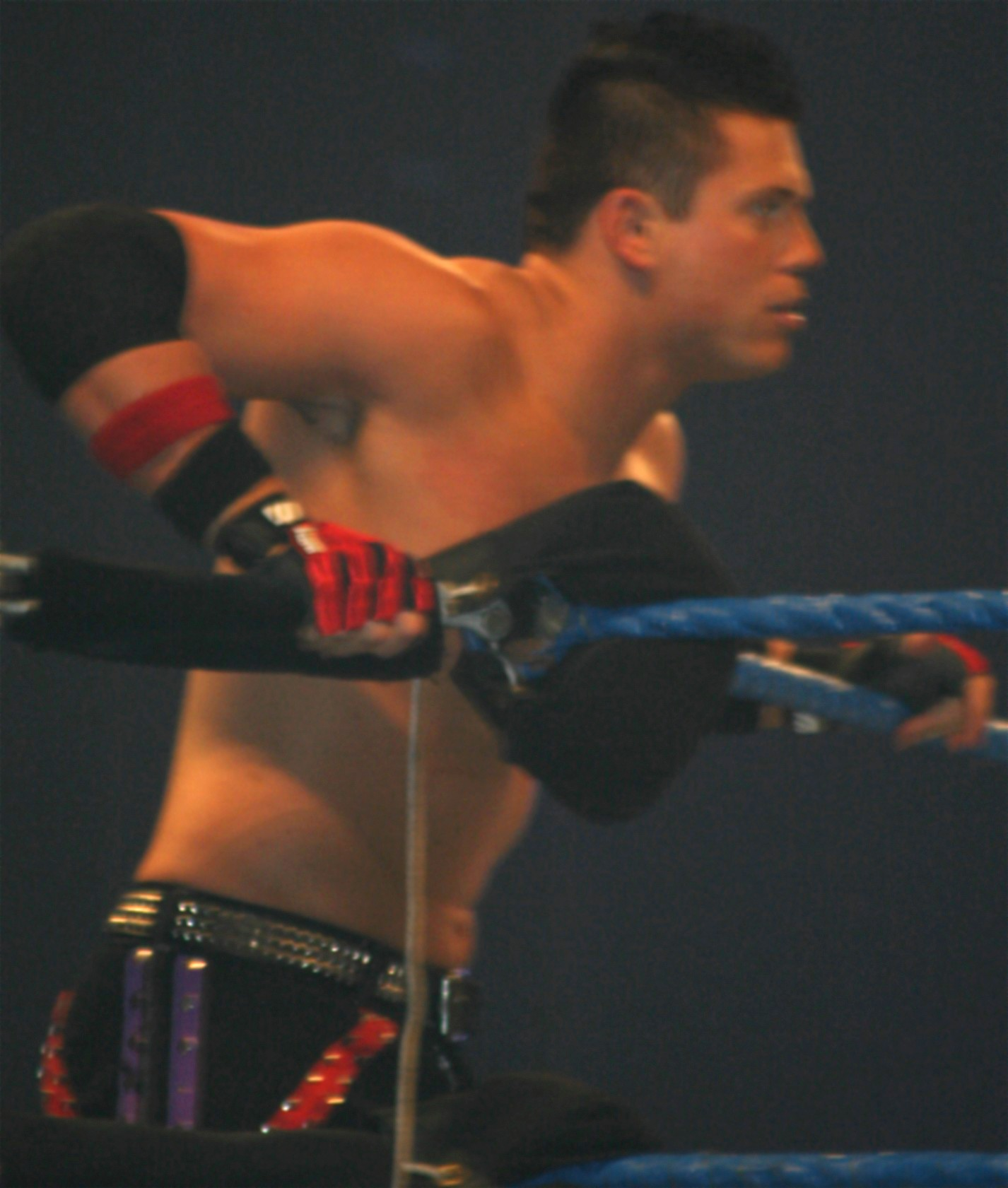
The Miz faced John Cena in the first official match between the two.

The first of three matches billed as the main event was the World Heavyweight Championship match between CM Punk and Jeff Hardy. The match was wrestled at a fast pace as the two exchanged a series of holds and kicks. As Punk was about to deliver a Go To Sleep, Hardy countered into a Twist of Fate, and executed the Swanton Bomb; Hardy then covered his opponent and got the pin. Though it appeared initially that he won the title, the referee soon discovered Punk's foot was under the bottom rope, causing the match to continue. As the competitors continued to fight, Punk performed a roundhouse kick on the referee, causing him to get disqualified, thus retaining the title. Following the match, a frustrated Hardy assaulted the champion, leading to the two being pulled apart by the referee and other officials.

John Cena faced The Miz next. Cena executed an Attitude Adjustment on The Miz and forced The Miz to submit to the STF to win the match.

The main event was the Three Stages of Hell match for the WWE Championship between Randy Orton and Triple H. In the first match, a singles match, Triple H was disqualified after hitting Orton with a chair, giving Orton the first victory. The next fall was the falls count anywhere match, which Triple H won after attacking Orton with the chair and a Pedigree outside the ring. The final match was the stretcher match. Triple H tried to end the match early by wheeling the champion over the yellow line on the stage that signified the end of the match only to have Orton slide off, leading to a brawl between the two on the stage. Orton performed a DDT off the stretcher onto the entrance ramp on Triple H. The fight went back up to the stage with Triple H delivering a Pedigree, followed by loading the stretcher with Orton until Orton's two protégés, Cody Rhodes and Ted DiBiase, interfered, preventing Triple H from winning by distracting him to have Orton attack him, put him on the stretcher, and wheel him across the finishing line to win the match. After the match, when Orton was celebrating his victory, Triple H attacked Orton with his signature sledgehammer.

== Reception ==
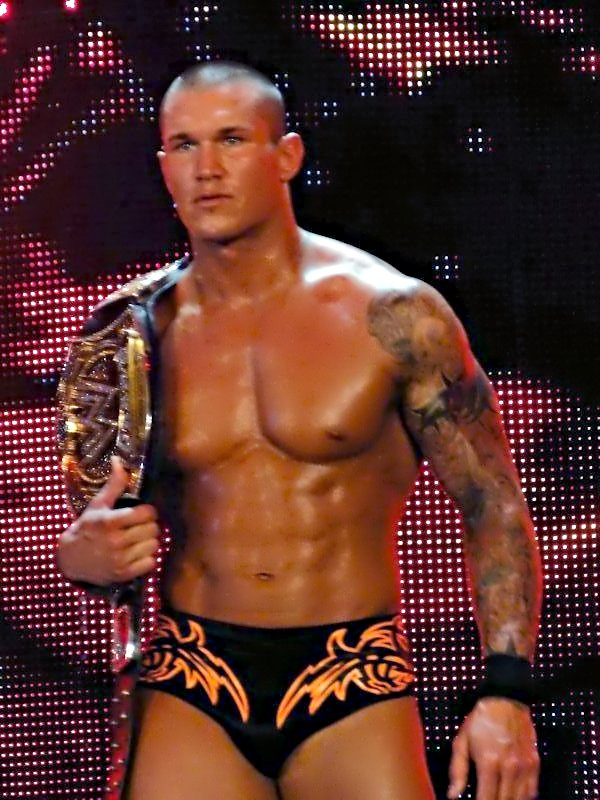
Randy Orton before his match

The show was rated as merely average by wrestling journalists. Canadian Online Explorer had analyst, Brian Elliott, review the show; he would comment that the show "failed to live up to expectations, largely due to bad booking." This criticism was built around what he had felt to be the inability of the company's creative writers to showcase effective segments and matches. Dave Meltzer, editor of the Wrestling Observer Newsletter, wrote a real-time commentary during the event; he was disappointed by a few moments in the show, but still saw the wrestling as a positive, particularly the main event, but said it was "nothing compared to their match (Triple H and Orton had) on Monday and this was the one you were paying for."

A seemingly-universal praise for the event from critics came in their commentary of the WWE Intercontinental Championship match between Rey Mysterio and Chris Jericho. Elliott dubbed this the "Match of the Night", giving it a rating of 8/10. James Caldwell, an editor for the Pro Wrestling Torch, commended the effort of both men for the overall quality of their rivalry over the past few months leading up to this encounter, saying that the two had "great chemistry". Meltzer called it "one of the better WWE matches this year."

The most noteworthy criticism of the show came from John Cena's match with The Miz. Wade Keller, editor of the Pro Wrestling Torch, who wrote a report of the show, said the encounter "was pretty much the worst finish possible" as it did not help elevate the status of The Miz as a viable competitor. Despite the favorable reviews of the Three Stages of Hell match, Keller referred to it as "stale" due to how many times prior to the show these two wrestled.

== Aftermath ==
=== Raw ===
On the episode of Raw following The Bash, it was announced that the general manager position for the Raw brand would be eradicated and replaced with a new weekly special guest host role. Batista was then announced as the first person to be special guest host. In his position, Batista announced the WWE Championship would be defended at the July event, Night of Champions; the competitor who would face Orton would be determined by the winner of the tournament that commenced that night. The semi-finals saw Triple H defeat Montel Vontavious Porter (MVP) and John Cena defeat The Miz to advance to the finals of the tournament to be held on the July 6 episode of Raw.

=== SmackDown ===
Following his match, on the July 2 episode of Superstars, CM Punk revealed he suffered a storyline eye injury at The Bash; after a match with Edge that caused him to forfeit due to extra damage inflicted in the match. Punk claimed the reason he struck the referee was because he was unable to see who his target was. Hardy continued after Punk, leading to the announcement the two would meet at Night of Champions for the title.

=== Future ===
The Bash was the only event in The Great American Bash chronology to be titled as The Bash, and it was also the final to be held on PPV. In 2010, the event was replaced on PPV by Fatal 4-Way, then in April 2011, the promotion ceased going by its full name of World Wrestling Entertainment, with "WWE" becoming an orphaned initialism. The event, which reverted to being called The Great American Bash, returned in July 2012 as a special episode of SmackDown. It was again revived in 2020 for the developmental brand NXT brand and has since been held as an annual event for NXT.

== Results ==
No.	Results	Stipulations	Times
1^{D}	R-Truth defeated Shelton Benjamin by pinfall	Singles match	9:18
2	Tommy Dreamer (c) defeated Christian, Finlay, Jack Swagger, and Mark Henry	Championship Scramble for the ECW Championship	14:46
3	Rey Mysterio defeated Chris Jericho (c) by pinfall	Title vs. Mask match for the WWE Intercontinental Championship	15:42
4	Dolph Ziggler defeated The Great Khali by pinfall	No Disqualification match	4:59
5	Edge and Chris Jericho defeated The Colóns (Carlito and Primo) (c) and The Legacy (Cody Rhodes and Ted DiBiase) by pinfall	Triple threat match for the Unified WWE Tag Team Championship (Note: The name "Unified WWE Tag Team Championship" referred to both the World Tag Team Championship and WWE Tag Team Championship being held and defended together, although both titles remained independently active.)	9:37
6	Michelle McCool (with Alicia Fox) defeated Melina (c) by pinfall	Singles match for the WWE Women's Championship	6:34
7	Jeff Hardy defeated CM Punk (c) by disqualification	Singles match for the World Heavyweight Championship	15:01
8	John Cena defeated The Miz by Submission	Singles match	5:39
9	Randy Orton (c) defeated Triple H 2-1	Three Stages of Hell match for the WWE Championship: Fall 1: Singles match (won by Orton); Fall 2: Falls Count Anywhere match (won by Triple H); Fall 3: Stretcher match (won by Orton)	21:23
(c) / – the champion(s) heading into the match; D / – this was a dark match

ECW Championship Scramble Interim Champions

Number	Wrestler	Entered	Pinned	Method	Times
1	Jack Swagger	2	Finlay	roll-up	4:41
2	Finlay	3	Jack Swagger	Celtic Cross	8:10
3	Mark Henry	5	Tommy Dreamer	World's Strongest Slam	10:25
4	Jack Swagger	2	Mark Henry	Swagger Bomb	12:18
Winner	Tommy Dreamer	4	Christian	DDT	13:24
