= DiBiase =

DiBiase may refer to:

- Brett DiBiase (born 1988), American retired professional wrestler and referee
- Mike DiBiase (wrestler, born 1923) (1923–1969), known as Iron Mike DiBiase, American professional wrestler
- Mike DiBiase (wrestler, born 1977) (born 1977), American professional wrestler
- Ted DiBiase (born 1954), American professional wrestler, manager, ordained minister and color commentator
- Ted DiBiase Jr. (born 1982), American professional wrestler and actor

== See also ==
- Dibiase (music producer), American music producer
- Di Biase, a surname
- Dibiasi, a surname
