= Mike DiBiase =

Mike DiBiase may refer to:

- Iron Mike DiBiase (1923–1969), American wrestler
- Mike DiBiase (wrestler, born 1977), American wrestler
