= Di Biase =

Di Biase may refer to:

- Anthony Di Biase (born 1988), Canadian soccer player
- David Di Biase (1935-2001), British dentist
- Michael Di Biase (born 1947), former Regional Councillor, deputy mayor and mayor of Vaughan, Ontario
- Moreno Di Biase (born 1975), Italian former professional racing cyclist
- Nico di Biase (born 1988), Argentine professional footballer

== See also ==
- DiBiase (disambiguation)
- Dibiasi, a surname
