= Virgil (wrestler) =

American professional wrestler (1951–2024)

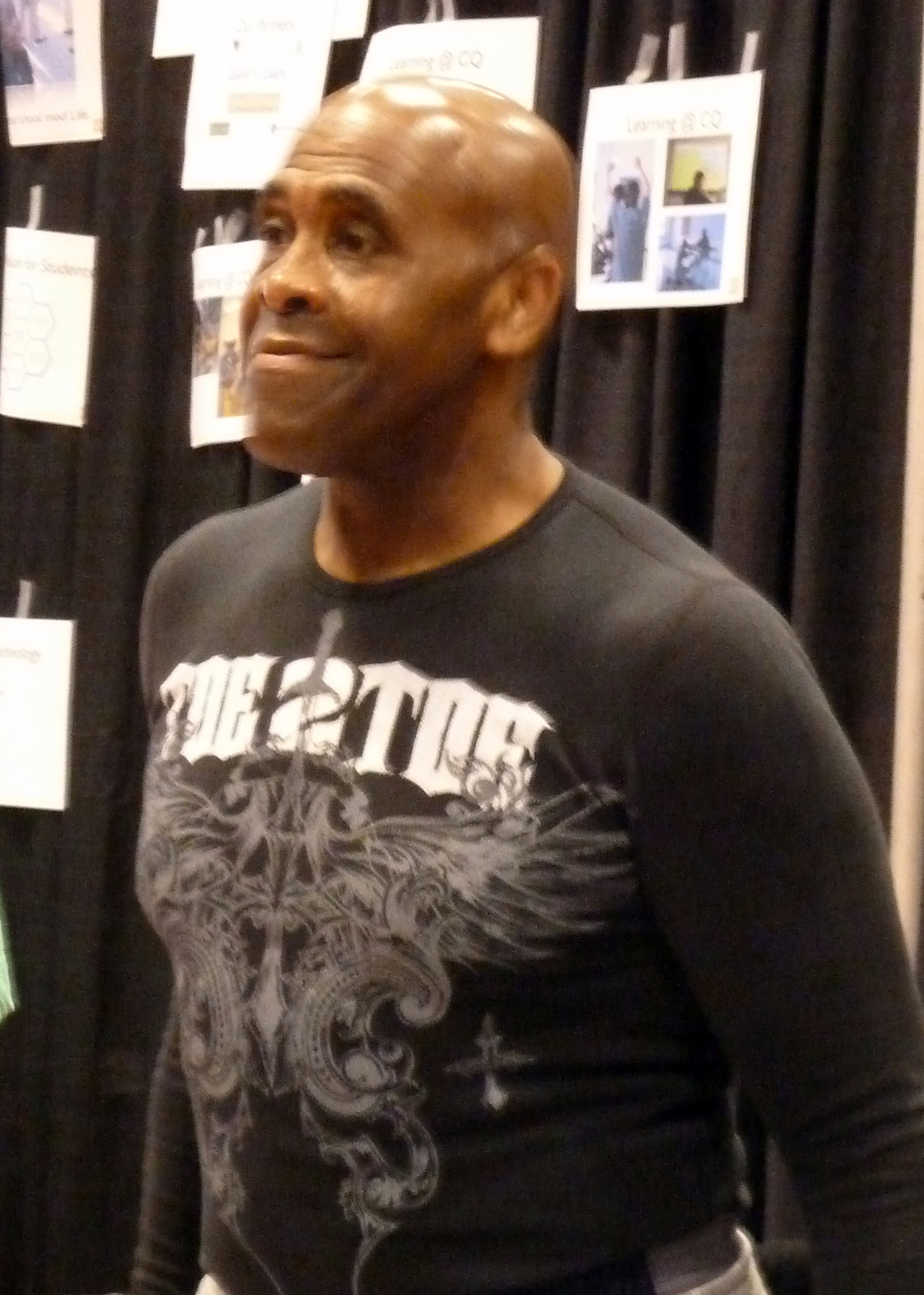
- Virgil in 2013

Personal information
- Born: Michael Charles Jones; April 7, 1951 Wilkinsburg, Pennsylvania, U.S.
- Died: February 28, 2024 (aged 72) Canonsburg, Pennsylvania, U.S.
- Education: Virginia Union University

Professional wrestling career
- Ring name(s): Curly Bill; Luscious Brown; Mr. Jones; Mike Jones; Shane; Soul Train Jones; Vincent; Vince; Virgil
- Billed height: 6 ft 00 in (1.83 m)
- Billed weight: 250 lb (113 kg)
- Billed from: Pittsburgh, Pennsylvania; Palm Beach, Florida
- Trained by: Afa Anoa'i
- Debut: 1985
- Retired: 2020

Michael Charles Jones (April 7, 1951 – February 28, 2024), better known by his ring name Virgil, was an American professional wrestler and an actor. He is best known for his tenures in the World Wrestling Federation (WWF, now WWE) and World Championship Wrestling (WCW).

In his four-year tenure in WCW, he wrestled primarily as a member of the nWo with the ring name Vincent, and later wrestled as Curly Bill, Shane, Soul Train Jones, and Mr. Jones. After retiring, he became well known on social media as the subject of viral memes.

== Early life ==
Michael Jones was born in Wilkinsburg, Pennsylvania on April 7, 1951, to Warren Jones Sr. and Elizabeth Jones. He had two older brothers, Warren Jr. and Donald, and a sister, Toni. Jones attended Virginia Union University, where he played as a defensive back for the college football team and wrestled as an amateur. Jones later worked at his uncle’s loading and moving company and began entering bodybuilding competitions.

== Professional wrestling career ==
=== Early career (1985–1987) ===
In 1985, Jones met Tony Atlas in a Pittsburgh gym, who recommended Jones to professional wrestling. After training with Afa Anoaʻi that year, Jones began wrestling as Soul Train Jones for the Championship Wrestling Association (CWA). On January 4, 1987, he defeated Big Bubba for the AWA International Heavyweight Championship, but lost the title to Chick Donovan on April 20. Also that month, Jones won the AWA Southern Tag Team Championship with Rocky Johnson, holding the titles for 28 days until they were defeated by Donovan and Jack Hart.

=== World Wrestling Federation (1986–1994, 1995) ===
==== Ted DiBiase's bodyguard (1987–1991) ====
Mega Bucks in 1988

Jones made his first appearance in the World Wrestling Federation (WWF) under the ring name Luscious Brown on September 17, 1986, losing to Paul Orndorff in Salisbury, Maryland.

In June 1987, Jones was repackaged as Virgil, the "Million Dollar Man" Ted DiBiase's silent bodyguard. Virgil performed humiliating tasks for DiBiase and carried his money, often being on the receiving end of attacks by DiBiase's rivals. He would also occasionally wrestle against DiBiase's rivals as a gatekeeper; if DiBiase’s opponents could defeat Virgil, they would be granted a match with DiBiase.

On January 19, 1991 at the Royal Rumble pay-per-view, after Virgil and DiBiase defeated Dusty Rhodes and Dustin Rhodes, Virgil turned on DiBiase, hitting him with his Million Dollar Championship, making him a fan favorite. After befriending and training with Roddy Piper, he defeated DiBiase by count-out at WrestleMania VII on March 24 then pinned him to win the unsanctioned Million Dollar Championship on August 26 at SummerSlam. He lost the Million Dollar Championship back to DiBiase on November 24 after interference from Repo Man. Three days later at Survivor Series, Virgil was on Piper’s team with Bret Hart and the British Bulldog, losing to DiBiase, Ric Flair, The Mountie and The Warlord. At This Tuesday in Texas on December 3, Virgil and Tito Santana lost to DiBiase and Repo Man.

==== Various storylines and departure (1992–1994, 1995) ====
Virgil then embarked in a career as a singles wrestler, serving as a jobber to the stars, and was famous for wearing unusual red candy-striped tights. At WrestleMania VIII on April 5, 1992, Virgil teamed with Big Boss Man, Sgt. Slaughter and Jim Duggan to defeat The Nasty Boys (Brian Knobbs and Jerry Sags), Repo Man and The Mountie. He also lost to Nailz at SummerSlam on August 29 (aired on August 31). He received a shot at Hart's WWF World Heavyweight Championship on the November 21 episode of WWF Superstars, but submitted to Hart's Sharpshooter. After the match, the two shook hands out of respect. Virgil lost to Yokozuna in the latter's pay-per-view debut on November 25 at Survivor Series.

Virgil’s time in the spotlight began to fade in 1993 but he remained in the undercard of the WWF. Virgil's last WWF pay-per-view appearance was at the Royal Rumble on January 22, 1994, entering the Royal Rumble match at number 10, but was quickly eliminated by Diesel. Following a feud in the summer with Nikolai Volkoff, who had been “bought” by DiBiase and defeated Virgil in a series of house show matches, Virgil left the WWF in August 1994.

From May to June 1995, Virgil briefly returned to the WWF to compete in several matches against Jean-Pierre LaFitte in Western Canada and the Midwestern United States.

=== National Wrestling Conference (1995) ===
On August 25, 1995, Virgil competed in the National Wrestling Conference in the supercard event "Night of Champions". The match aroused controversy when Virgil's opponent, The Thug, came out to the ring dressed in a KKK hood. The Thug was accompanied by another man dressed in a full KKK outfit, who revealed himself as Jim "The Anvil" Neidhart. Both men attacked Virgil, with Neidhart rolling the KKK robe into a noose and hanging Virgil on the outside ropes. The 2-on-1 assault ended when the building's security dragged Neidhart to the back and Virgil was carried away on a stretcher.

=== World Championship Wrestling (1996–2000) ===
==== New World Order (1996–1999) ====
In 1996, Jones debuted for World Championship Wrestling (WCW) as Vincent, the eighth member of the original nWo along with Ted DiBiase. He was given the role of nWo's "Head of Security" and often took the brunt of the beatings from WCW wrestlers to protect the other nWo members. Jones had minor success upon his arrival, having a short stint of undefeated matches on WCW Saturday Night. After DiBiase quit the nWo, Vincent began accompanying Scott Norton, Scott Steiner, Konnan and Brian Adams to the ring. At Starrcade on December 28, 1997, he teamed with Norton and Randy Savage to defeat the Steiner Brothers and Ray Traylor.

When the nWo split in 1998, Vincent remained loyal to the original black and white faction led by Hollywood Hulk Hogan, which was now being called “nWo Hollywood”, frequently teaming with new nWo Hollywood recruit Stevie Ray. After Starrcade, the nWo Hollywood and Wolfpac factions reunited and formed two squads, Wolfpac or nWo Red & Black (also known as nWo Elite), and Vincent was demoted to be a part of the nWo Black & White (known as the nWo “B-Team”) with The Giant, Adams, Curt Hennig, Horace Hogan, Norton and Ray.

On the February 13, 1999 episode of WCW Saturday Night, before his match with Johnny Swinger; Vincent asked for a microphone and changed his name to Vince. He began feuding with Ray over who would be the de facto leader of the nWo B-Team, but Ray became the leader after defeating Vince in a Harlem Street Fight at Uncensored on March 15. The issue of who was the leader persisted, and on April 5 episode of Monday Nitro, a 4-man battle royale was held to determine the leader, but Vince was the first man eliminated by Adams; Ray won the match. In the following months, Vince remained with the nWo B-Team as the last remaining member of the original nWo. Both squads of the nWo shrunk as one member after another slowly left over time, leaving only Vince as the sole member and de facto last leader of the original nWo before the faction dissolved for good in October.

==== West Texas Rednecks, Powers That Be, Mr. Jones and end of WCW (1999–2000) ====
After the nWo dissolved, Jones changed his name to Curly Bill and joined the West Texas Rednecks with Hennig, Barry Windham, Kendall Windham and Bobby Duncum Jr.

Vince Russo started the “Powers That Be” and in December 1999 changed Jones’s name to Shane and made him a bodyguard character once again for himself and the Harris Brothers (known briefly as Creative Control).

In mid-2000, Jones became Mr. Jones; the manager for Ernest "The Cat" Miller, but he was soon replaced by a valet named Ms. Jones. This was Jones' final character in WCW and he wrestled under his real name, Mike Jones, before departing WCW in late 2000.

=== Later career (2000–2020) ===
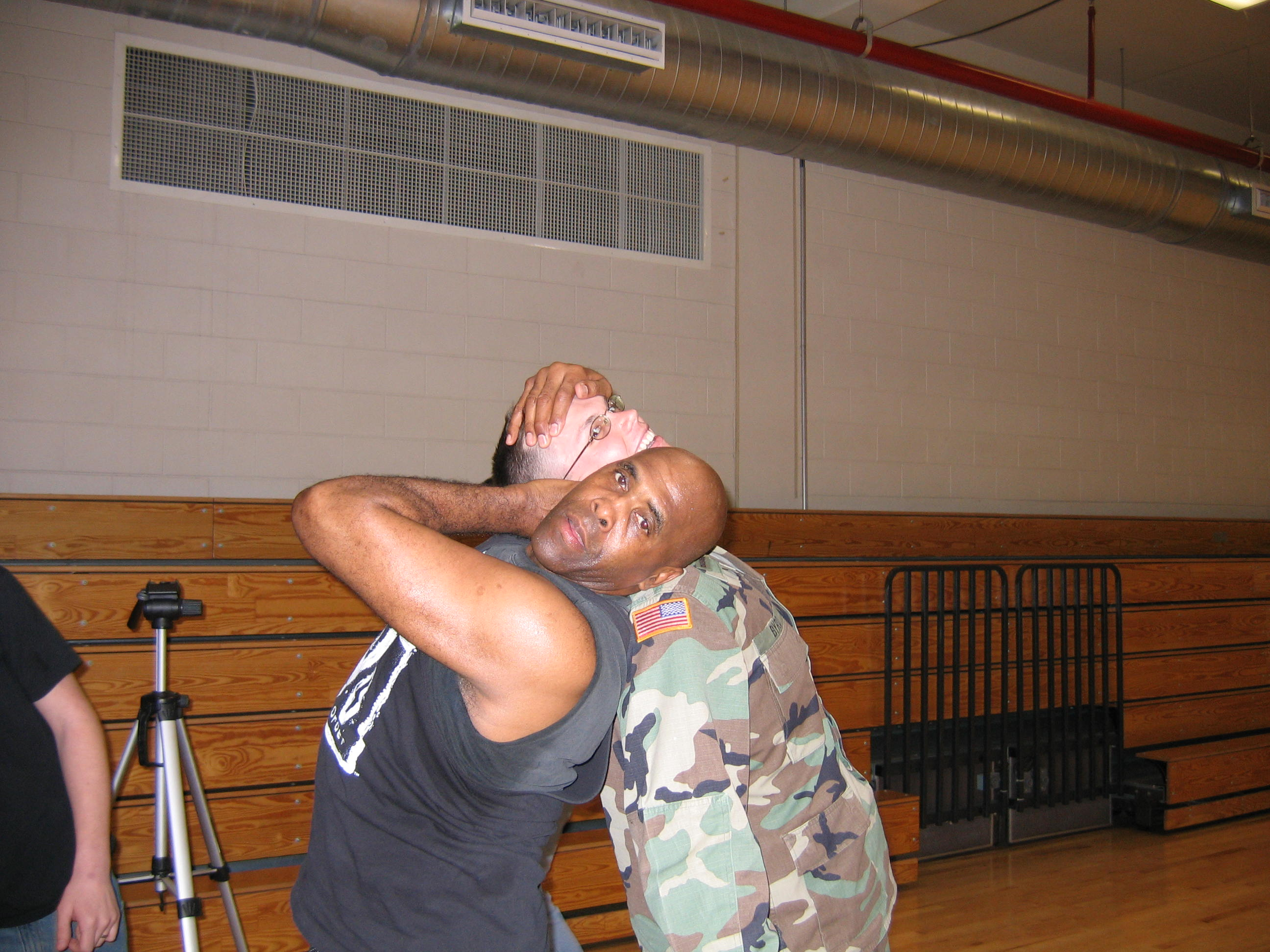
Jones posing with a U.S. Soldier by demonstrating a neckbreaker in April 2006

On April 29, 2006, Jones appeared at the World Wrestling Legends (WWL) pay-per-view 6:05 The Reunion, losing to Rick Steiner. Also that year, he wrestled for the Armed Force Entertainment as Vincent of the nWo for U.S. troops in Korea, Tokyo, Guam and Honolulu.

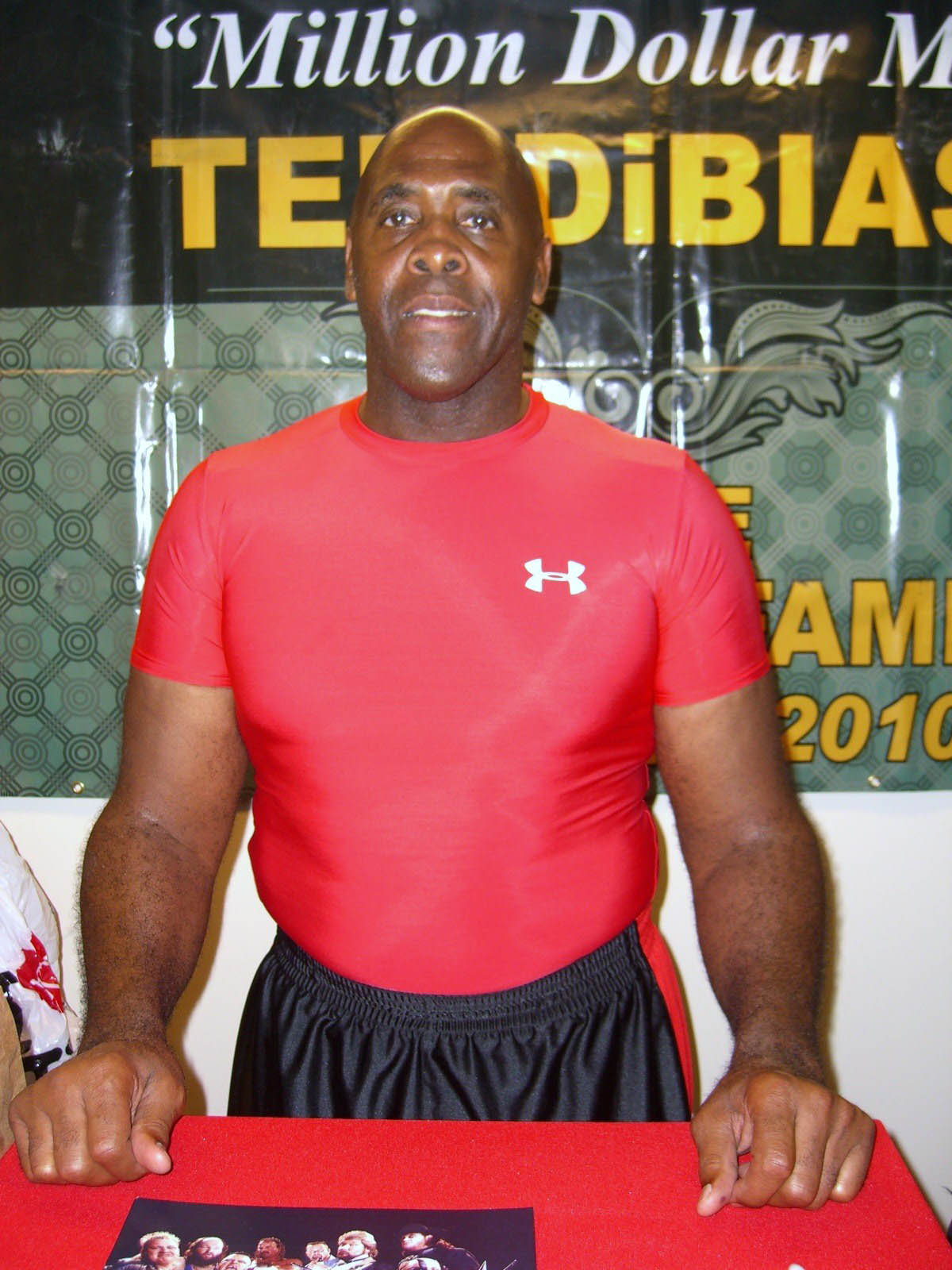
Virgil in October 2010

In 2016, he appeared on the "Old School" and the "Addicted to the Shindig" episodes of The Edge and Christian Show on the WWE Network. In an interview with ESPN.com in September 2016, DiBiase revealed that he and Jones had a falling out over Jones booking independent wrestling shows for the two without DiBiase's knowledge, which led to DiBiase unknowingly no-showing the events. DiBiase had to apologize to the promotions for the unintentional no-shows and had to stress that Jones did not represent him for bookings.

On December 1, 2017, he wrestled a match for Preston City Wrestling (PCW) at Joey Janela's Big Top Adventure. On April 5, 2019, Virgil, dressed as the character Starman from NES Pro Wrestling, appeared at Joey Janela's Spring Break 3, where he defeated Ethan Page. In late 2020, Virgil made a cameo in the ball for a ball match at Talk'N ShopAMania 2, which was hosted by the Good Brothers.

=== Return to WWE (2010) ===
On the May 17, 2010 episode of Raw, Jones, reprising his Virgil character, returned to WWE as the bodyguard of Ted DiBiase Jr. He carried out all of his old actions, such as holding the ropes open for DiBiase and bringing him a microphone when asked. On the June 14 episode of Raw, Virgil and DiBiase were in a tag team match against Big Show and Raw guest host Mark Feuerstein. After Virgil got pinned and lost the match, DiBiase stuffed a $100 bill in Virgil's mouth and walked out on him. The following week, DiBiase first apologized to Virgil, but then fired him and replaced him with Maryse.

=== All Elite Wrestling (2019–2020) ===
From 2019 to 2020, Jones, under his old ring name of Soul Train Jones, began making recurring appearances for All Elite Wrestling (AEW) as an ally of Chris Jericho and The Inner Circle. On the November 6, 2019 episode of Dynamite, he appeared in a video package that mocked an earlier promo from Cody Rhodes (whom Jericho was feuding with at the time). On the November 27 episode of Dynamite, Jones introduced Jericho for his Thanksgiving Thank You Celebration, which was interrupted by SoCal Uncensored. On the April 29, 2020 episode of Dynamite, Jones made a cameo during the Inner Circle's Bubbly Bunch segment, appearing in the Manitoba Melee.

== Other media ==
In 2014, Jones appeared in the Jason Michael Brescia film, Bridge and Tunnel as Kony, a neighborhood barfly. In 2017, he reprised the role in Brescia's follow-up film, (Romance) in the Digital Age.

=== Pop culture ===
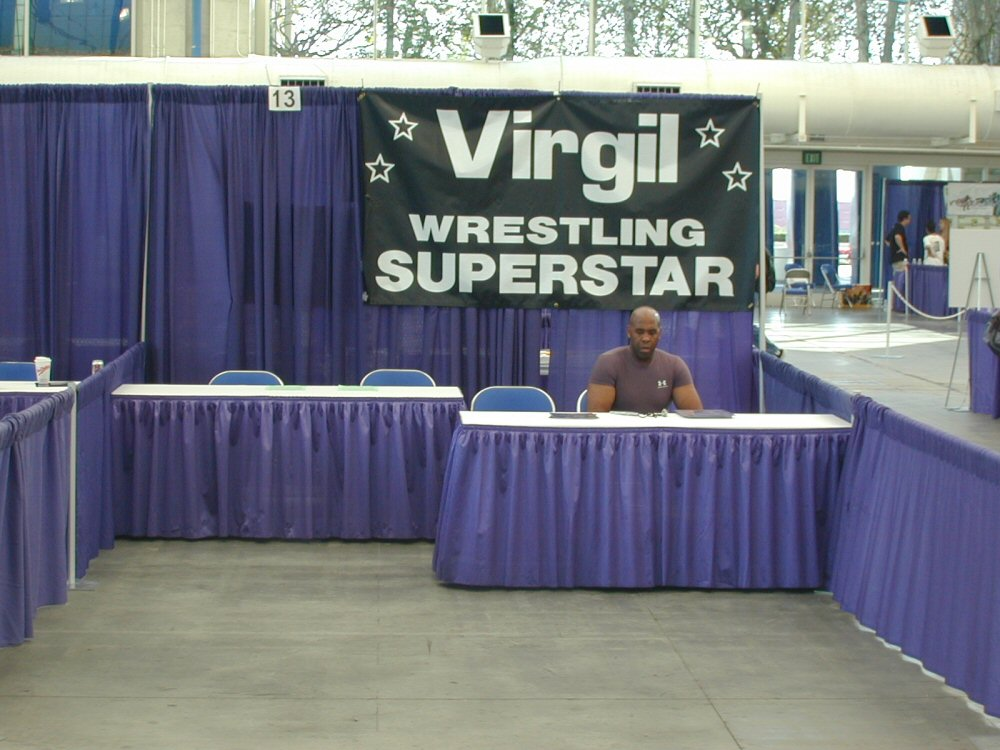
Jones at a convention in March 2006, an early example of the "Lonely Virgil" meme

Post-fame, Jones had been attending fan conventions and was seen at subway stations selling autographs. As a result, since 2012, there have been "Lonely Virgil" memes created where fans posted pictures of him at conventions with nobody lining up. Lonely Virgil was originally created by Sam Roberts of the Opie and Anthony radio show.

In 2015, a documentary featuring Jones was released titled The Legend of Virgil & His Traveling Merchandise Table, which discusses his wrestling career and the recent upsurge of social media discussions surrounding him. In September 2017, Mattel released a WWE action figure of Virgil, including his convention plaque as an accessory. The figure was made available at the New York Comic Con, and subsequently at Toys "R" Us stores.

== Personal life and death ==
Jones had a degree in mathematics from the University of Virginia and became a high school math teacher in Pittsburgh after retiring from in-ring competition full time in 2000.

On April 15, 2022, Jones revealed that he had previously suffered two strokes and had been diagnosed with dementia. A month later, he said he was diagnosed with stage two colon cancer. He was diagnosed with two additional strokes on February 23, 2024, and died five days later at Canonsburg Hospital of complications from the strokes and dementia at age 72. His memorial service was at Coston Funeral Home on March 16, 2024 in Pittsburgh, Pennsylvania.

=== Age dispute ===
Jones had multiple conflicting dates of birth up until his death, with most media believing he died at the age of 61. However, his family and friends revealed his actual age at death as 72.

== Championships and accomplishments ==
- American Wrestling Association
  - AWA International Heavyweight Championship (1 time)
  - AWA Southern Tag Team Championship (1 time) – with Rocky Johnson
- New Jack City Wrestling
  - NJCW Heavyweight Championship (1 time)
- Pro Wrestling Illustrated
  - Ranked No. 74 of the top 500 singles wrestlers in the PWI 500 in 1992
  - Ranked No. 483 of the top 500 singles wrestlers in the PWI Years in 2003
- United States Wrestling League
  - USWL Intercontinental Championship (1 time)
- World Wrestling Federation
  - Million Dollar Championship (1 time)
- Wrestling Observer Newsletter
  - Best Gimmick (1996) – nWo
  - Feud of the Year (1996) New World Order vs. World Championship Wrestling

== Filmography ==
Film
Year	Title	Role	Notes
2014	Bridge and Tunnel	Kony	
2015	The Legend of Virgil & His Traveling Merchandise Table	Himself	Documentary
2017	(Romance) in the Digital Age	Kony	
2017	Sweet Daddy Siki	Himself	Documentary

Television
Year	Title	Role	Notes
1999	Louis Theroux's Weird Weekends	Himself	Episode: "Wrestling"
2004	Penn & Teller: Bullshit!	Himself	Episode: "12-Stepping"
2015	The Special Without Brett Davis	Himself	Episode: "Fuck Money"
2015	The Nightly Show with Larry Wilmore	Himself	2 episodes
2016	The Edge and Christian Show That Totally Reeks of Awesomeness	Himself	2 episodes
