= Helen Hild =

American professional wrestler (1926–1984)

- Promotional photograph of Helen Hild

Personal information
- Born: Gladys Helen Nevins; February 26, 1926 Omaha, Nebraska, U.S.
- Died: March 4, 1984 (aged 58)
- Spouse: Iron Mike DiBiase (m. 1958; died 1969)
- Children: Ted DiBiase
- Family: Ted DiBiase Jr. (grandson); Mike DiBiase (grandson); Brett DiBiase (grandson)

Professional wrestling career
- Ring name(s): Betty Hild; Gladys Galento; Gladys Hild; Gladys Wills; Helen Held; Helen Hild
- Billed height: 5 ft 6 in (1.68 m)
- Billed weight: 128 lb (58 kg)
- Debut: 1946
- Retired: 1971

Gladys Helen Nevins (February 26, 1926 – March 4, 1984), better known by her ring name Helen Hild, was an American female professional wrestler and model. She wrestled for extended periods of time for various wrestling promotions: All-Star Wrestling, Big Time Wrestling, Championship Wrestling from Florida, Central States Wrestling, Georgia Championship Wrestling, Mid-Atlantic Championship Wrestling, Minneapolis Boxing & Wrestling Club, NWA Mid-America and the World Wide Wrestling Federation.

== Early life ==
Nevins was born in Omaha, Nebraska and had a brother named Marv who played football for University of Nebraska Omaha.

== Professional wrestling career ==
Hild wrestled through the 1940s, 1950s and 1960s. One of the top female wrestling stars in the U.S. during the 1940s and 50s, she challenged Mildred Burke for the NWA World Women's Championship several times between 1948 and 1951. Hild was often a rival to The Fabulous Moolah. Their encounter in Seattle, Washington on August 9, 1957, was the first woman's wrestling match to be held in the city in 12 years.

== Personal life ==
Nevins gave birth to a son named Theodore Marvin, later known as wrestler Ted DiBiase, in 1954, fathered by Ted Wills, an entertainer and singer. She later married fellow wrestler "Iron" Mike DiBiase, who adopted Theodore. After Mike's death during a 1969 wrestling match, she became depressed and began to abuse alcohol.

== Championships and accomplishments ==
- Pro Wrestling Illustrated
  - PWI ranked her # 37 of the best 50 female singles wrestlers in PWI's The Women of Wrestling in 1996.
  - PWI ranked her # 38 of the best 100 female singles wrestlers in PWI's 100 Hottest Women of Wrestling in 2002.
- Nebraska Pro Wrestling Hall of Fame (2019)
