= SummerSlam (2009) =

World Wrestling Entertainment pay-per-view event

- Promotional poster featuring various WWE wrestlers
- Promotion: World Wrestling Entertainment
- Brand(s): Raw; SmackDown; ECW
- Date: August 23, 2009
- City: Los Angeles, California
- Venue: Staples Center
- Attendance: 17,129
- Buy rate: 369,000
- Tagline: The Biggest Event of the Summer

Pay-per-view chronology
← Previous; Night of Champions	Next → Breaking Point

SummerSlam chronology
← Previous; 2008	Next → 2010

The 2009 SummerSlam was a professional wrestling pay-per-view (PPV) event produced by World Wrestling Entertainment (WWE). It was the 22nd annual SummerSlam and took place on August 23, 2009, at the Staples Center in Los Angeles, California, held for wrestlers from the promotion's Raw, SmackDown, and ECW brand divisions. This was the first of six consecutive SummerSlam events to take place at the Staples Center and the last SummerSlam to include the ECW brand and the ECW Championship, as the brand was dissolved in February 2010, deactivating the championship along with it.

Eight matches were contested on the event's card. The main events of the evening included CM Punk defeating Jeff Hardy in a Tables, Ladders, and Chairs match to win SmackDown's World Heavyweight Championship for a third time, Randy Orton retaining Raw's WWE Championship against John Cena after the match was restarted multiple times, Christian retaining the ECW Championship against William Regal, and in a bout from Raw, D-Generation X (Triple H and Shawn Michaels) defeated The Legacy (Cody Rhodes and Ted DiBiase). Also on the show, SmackDown's Intercontinental Champion Rey Mysterio defeated Dolph Ziggler while Jeri-Show (Chris Jericho and Big Show) defended the Unified WWE Tag Team Championship against Cryme Tyme (JTG and Shad Gaspard). The event received 369,000 buys, down from the 2008 figure of 477,000 buys.

== Production ==
=== Background ===
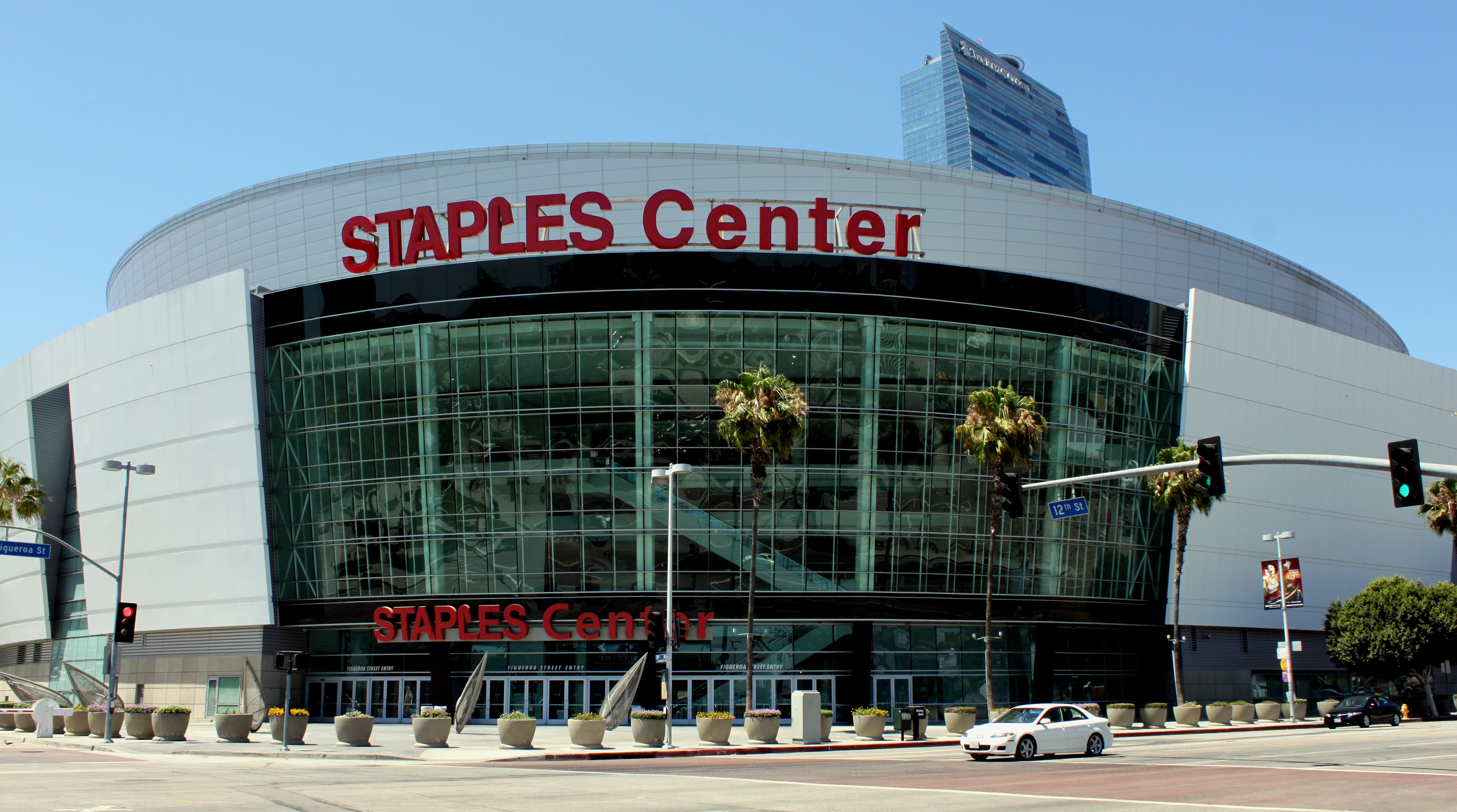
The 22nd annual SummerSlam was held at the Staples Center in Los Angeles, California.

SummerSlam is an annual professional wrestling pay-per-view (PPV) event produced every August by World Wrestling Entertainment (WWE) since 1988. Dubbed "The Biggest Party of the Summer", it is one of the promotion's original four pay-per-views, along with WrestleMania, Royal Rumble, and Survivor Series, referred to as the "Big Four". It has since become considered WWE's second biggest event of the year behind WrestleMania. The 22nd SummerSlam was scheduled to be held on August 23, 2009, at Staples Center in Los Angeles, California and featured wrestlers from the Raw, SmackDown, and ECW brands.

Tickets for SummerSlam went on sale starting February 13, 2009. The first teaser trailer for the event was shown at WWE's Extreme Rules event. The trailer included the event's official theme song, "You Gotta Move" by Aerosmith. As part of the promotion for the event, WWE held SummerSlam Axxess, a fan convention similar to WrestleMania's fan convention, WrestleMania Axxess, at Nokia Plaza in L.A. Live from August 22 to August 23. Video game publisher THQ also promoted that further details of WWE SmackDown vs. Raw 2010 would be revealed at the event.

=== Storylines ===
The professional wrestling matches at SummerSlam included professional wrestlers performing as characters in scripted events predetermined by the hosting promotion, WWE. Storylines between the characters were produced on WWE's weekly television shows Raw, SmackDown, and ECW with the Raw, SmackDown, and ECW brands—storyline divisions in which WWE assigned its employees to different programs.

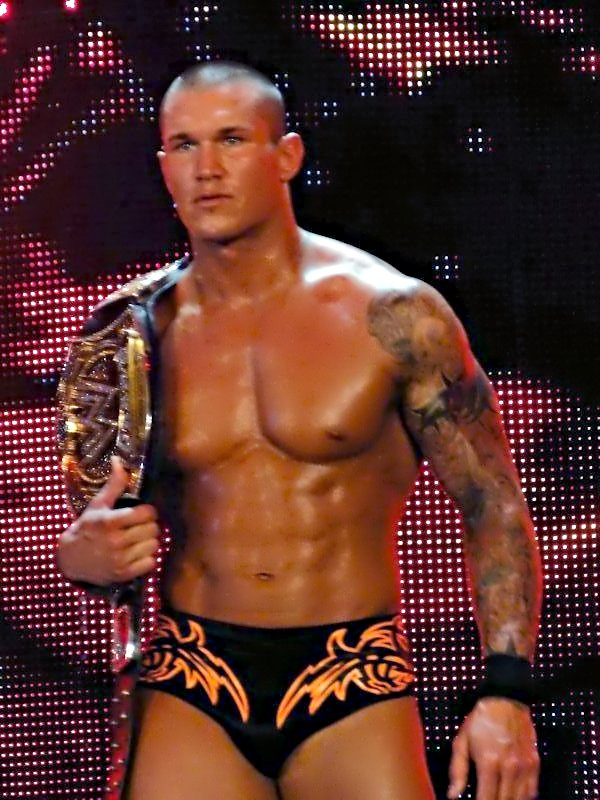
Randy Orton defended Raw's WWE Championship against John Cena at SummerSlam.

On the July 27 episode of Raw, the show's guest host and storyline matchmaker, Shaquille O'Neal, revealed that Randy Orton would defend the WWE Championship against the winner of a Beat the Clock challenge, which was determined by who of the five competitors could defeat their opponent in the fastest time: Mark Henry, Montel Vontavious Porter (MVP), Triple H, Jack Swagger, or John Cena. Henry set the pace by defeating Carlito in 6:49, while MVP, Triple H, and Swagger failed to defeat their opponents. Cena beat Henry's time by defeating The Miz, and become Orton's opponent at SummerSlam.

The main rivalry from the SmackDown brand heading into SummerSlam was between Jeff Hardy and CM Punk in their continuing conflict over the World Heavyweight Championship. Animosity stemmed from Extreme Rules when Punk invoked the guaranteed title match he earned by winning the Money in the Bank ladder match against Hardy and defeated him for the World Heavyweight title. The two faced off at the next two pay-per-view events, The Bash and Night of Champions, with Hardy winning the latter match to regain the title. This also saw a number of conflicts between the two over their respective philosophies in life; Punk is legitimately straight edge, which promotes a drug-free lifestyle, while Hardy, who has had a number of indiscretions with drugs throughout his career, was at odds with the way Punk reprimanded the fans for their potential addictions. Following two assaults on Hardy, SmackDown General Manager, Theodore Long, scheduled a Tables, Ladders, and Chairs match between the two for SummerSlam.

The ECW brand was represented at the show with Christian defending the ECW Championship against William Regal. On the August 11 episode of the program, Christian was a guest on the talk show segment, The Abraham Washington Show, during which Regal was revealed the number one contender.

On the July 27 episode of Raw, the Unified WWE Tag Team Champions Chris Jericho and The Big Show got into a heated confrontation with Shaquille O'Neal. After the two refused to get into a fight with him, O'Neal scheduled the champions to fight Cryme Tyme in a tag team match later that night with O'Neal acting as the match's ringside enforcer; the champions were disqualified, making their opponents angry. On the July 31 episode of SmackDown, Cryme Tyme defeated The Hart Dynasty (Tyson Kidd and David Hart Smith) to become Jericho and Big Show's opponents for SummerSlam.

WWE Intercontinental Champion Rey Mysterio Jr. had been the target of Dolph Ziggler since July. The two met at Night of Champions, only to see Mysterio retain the title. Ziggler regained his contender status on the August 7 episode of SmackDown by defeating R-Truth, Mike Knox, and Finlay in a fatal four-way.

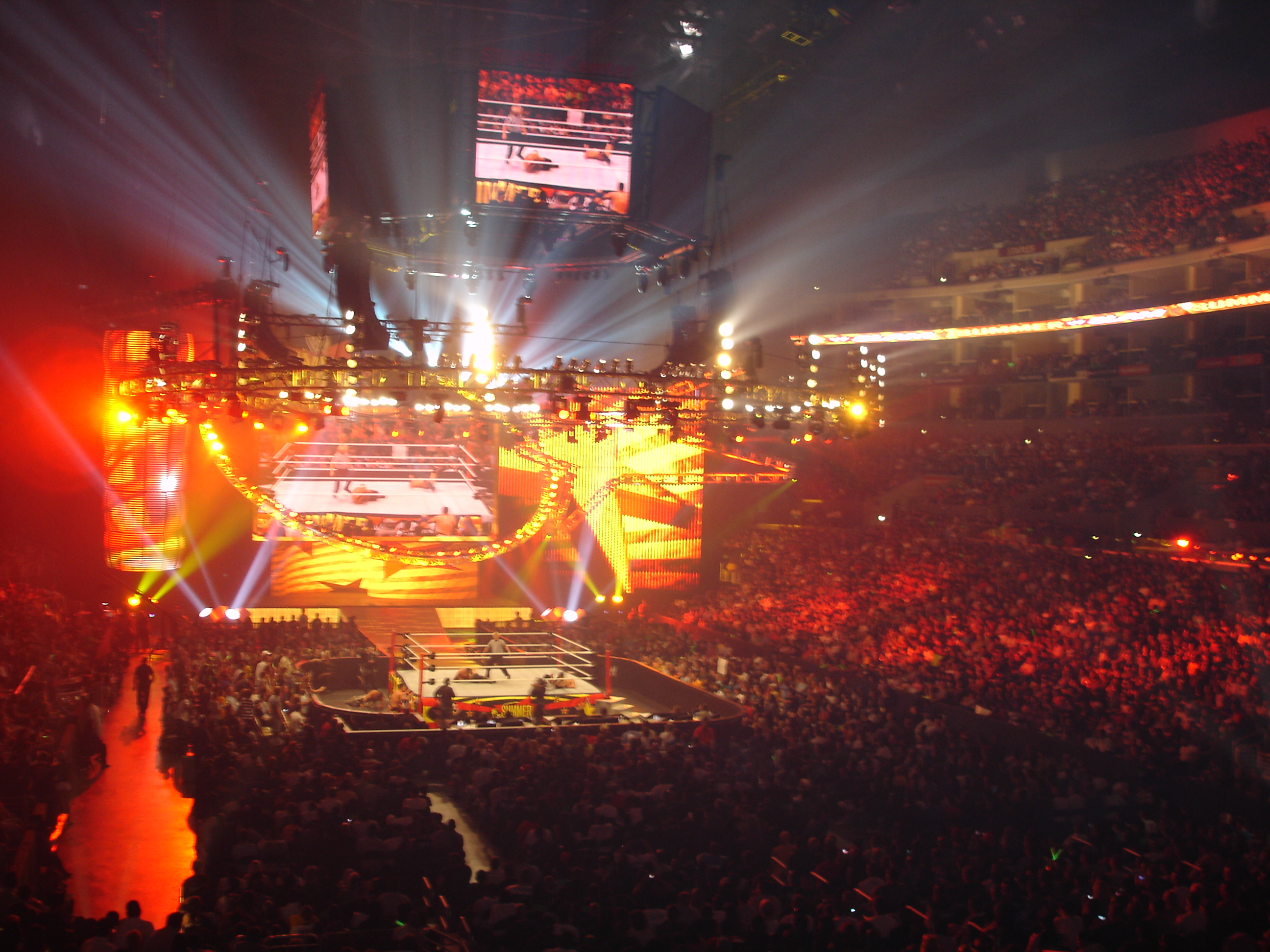
Inside Staples Center during SummerSlam. The venue would host the event for the next five years.

Stemming from his previous rivalry with Randy Orton, Triple H started to target Orton's Legacy associates, Ted DiBiase Jr. and Cody Rhodes. Triple H failed to win a Beat the Clock challenge to face Orton in a match with Rhodes when DiBiase distracted him for sufficient time. After losing a handicap match against the two the following week, Triple H stated that he was going to get a partner, hinting throughout the show that he intended to reform D-Generation X with Shawn Michaels. A week later, it was revealed that Triple H had convinced Michaels, who was working as a chef at a corporate cafeteria, to quit his job and return at SummerSlam to face DiBiase and Rhodes in a tag team match.

At The Bash, The Great Khali was assaulted with a steel chair by Kane in his match with Dolph Ziggler. The following weeks saw both men interfere in each other's matches with Kane running away from his adversary any time Khali made his way to gain a measure of revenge. On the August 7 episode of SmackDown, Kane attacked Khali from behind before kidnapping Khali's translator, Ranjin Singh. The following week, it was revealed that Kane was holding Singh hostage in a backstage room at Rexall Place in Edmonton, Alberta, interrogating and abusing him, before Khali found him, leading to Kane beating down on Khali. The following week, a match between the two was scheduled for SummerSlam.

After Jack Swagger was moved to the Raw brand, he had a verbal confrontation with Montel Vontavious Porter, which led to MVP challenging the former to a fight, which was declined by Swagger on the grounds of his unwillingness to "fight criminals", referring to MVP's previous incarceration. The coming weeks saw Swagger and MVP interfere in each other's business before MVP challenged Swagger on the August 17 episode of Raw. After Swagger got himself disqualified, another match was scheduled for SummerSlam.

== Event ==
Other on-screen personnel
Role:	Name:
English Commentators	Michael Cole (Raw)
English Commentators	Jerry Lawler (Raw)
English Commentators	Todd Grisham (SmackDown)
English Commentators	Jim Ross (SmackDown)
English Commentators	Josh Mathews (ECW)
English Commentators	Matt Striker (ECW)
Spanish Commentators	Carlos Cabrera
Spanish Commentators	Hugo Savinovich
Backstage interviewer	Josh Mathews
Ring announcers	Lilian Garcia (Raw)
Ring announcers	Justin Roberts (SmackDown)
Ring announcers	Tony Chimel (ECW)
Referees	Charles Robinson
Referees	Mike Chioda
Referees	John Cone
Referees	Chad Patton
Referees	Scott Armstrong
Referees	Jack Doan
Referees	Justin King
Referees	Aaron Mahoney

=== Dark match ===
Prior to SummerSlam airing live on pay-per-view, the company's female wrestlers, known as divas, fought in a battle royal, with Chavo Guerrero as the guest referee. Beth Phoenix won the match by simultaneously eliminating Eve Torres and Kelly Kelly with Guerrero's help.

=== Preliminary matches ===
The show began airing with Rey Mysterio defending the WWE Intercontinental Championship against Dolph Ziggler. The match was contested at a fast pace, with Mysterio gaining executing a moonsault before the match descended out of the ring, where Mysterio executed a hurricanrana. As the match returned to the ring, Mysterio attempted an aerial attack, but Ziggler countered with a turnbuckle powerbomb. Mysterio attempted a 619, but Ziggler countered with a leg drop bulldog. As the match continued, Mysterio executed the 619 and attempted a springboard splash, but Ziggler avoided the move. Ziggler climbed to the top rope with Mysterio and attempted an attack, but Mysterio countered with a frankensteiner to retain the title.

Next, Jack Swagger faced MVP. Swagger applied various holds and attempted a Swagger Bomb on MVP, but MVP countered the move. MVP executed a big boot on Swagger, who was cornered, and the Playmaker for the win.

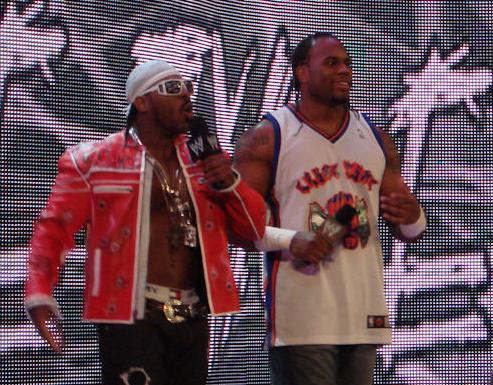
Cryme Tyme (JTG and Shad Gaspard) unsuccessfully challenged Chris Jericho and Big Show for the Unified WWE Tag Team Championship.

JeriShow (Chris Jericho and The Big Show) defended the Unified WWE Tag Team Championship against Cryme Tyme (JTG and Shad Gaspard). After JTG gained advantage over Jericho, Jericho tagged in Big Show, dominating JTG. JTG tagged in Gaspard, who was speared by The Big Show. Jericho applied the Walls of Jericho on JTG, who tried to reach the ropes, but Big Show executed a KO Punch on him, allowing Jericho to pin JTG to retain the titles.

Next, Kane faced The Great Khali. The two fought until Kane pursued Ranjin Singh. Kane performed a dropkick to Khali's knee and executed a running DDT for the victory.

=== Main event matches ===
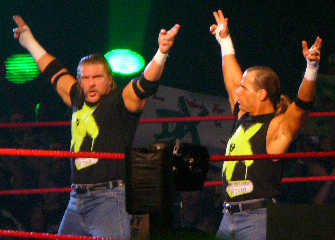
Triple H and Shawn Michaels reunited at the event as D-Generation X to challenge The Legacy (Cody Rhodes and Ted Dibiase).

D-Generation X (Triple H and Shawn Michaels) faced The Legacy (Cody Rhodes and Ted Dibiase) in Michaels' first match since WrestleMania 25. The match started with Triple H fighting DiBiase and Rhodes. When Michaels tagged in, Rhodes left the ring to avoid Sweet Chin Music. After Legacy gained the advantage, Rhodes attempted a diving elbow drop, but Michaels countered the move. Michaels attempted a diving elbow drop, but Rhodes countered and executed Cross Rhodes on Michaels. Triple H broke up the pin and executed the Pedigree on Rhodes, leading to DiBiase executing Dream Street on Triple H. As DiBiase and Triple H fought outside the ring, Michaels executed Sweet Chin Music on Rhodes to win the match.

Next, Christian defended the ECW Championship against William Regal, accompanied by Ezekiel Jackson and Vladimir Kozlov. As Regal was removing his coat, Christian executed the Killswitch to retain the title. After the match, Jackson and Kozlov attacked Christian, with Jackson executing The Book of Ezekiel and Kozlov executing the Iron Curtain on Christian and Regal applied the Regal Stretch on Christian.

Randy Orton defended the WWE Championship against John Cena. The match started with neither man gaining the advantage until Orton executed an elevated DDT on Cena. As Orton attempted a punt, Cena fought back. Cena attempted an Attitude Adjustment, but Orton countered and was disqualified for shoving the referee. Vince McMahon restarted the match with the stipulation that if Orton was disqualified, he would lose the title. As the match progressed, Orton intentionally got himself counted out but McMahon restarted the match again this time if Orton got Counted out or disqualified, he will lose the title. Orton pinned Cena using the ropes for leverage, but a second referee ran down to the ring and convinced the original referee to restart the match. Cena applied the STF, but a person from the crowd (later revealed as Brett DiBiase) assaulted the referee. After the person was removed from the ring, Orton executed an RKO to retain the title.

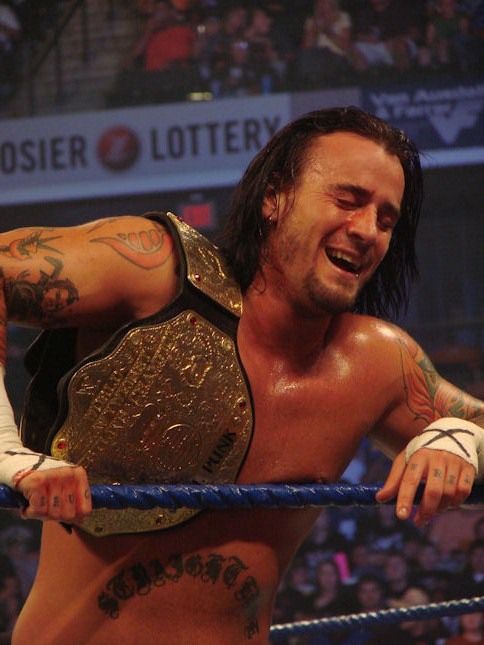
CM Punk defeated Jeff Hardy in a Tables, Ladders, and Chairs match to win SmackDown's World Heavyweight Championship.

The main event was the Tables, Ladders, and Chairs match for the World Heavyweight Championship between Jeff Hardy and CM Punk. Punk tried to climb a ladder, but Hardy stopped him. Hardy set up a chair in front of Punk and attempted a leg lariat, but Punk countered and dropped Hardy onto the chair. Punk executed a suicide dive on Hardy and Punk then attempted another chair shot on Hardy but Hardy countered. Punk tried to run Hardy into the steel steps but Hardy reversed Punk, which Punk jumped on the top step to avoid collision and tried to jump onto Hardy, but Hardy hit Punk with a chair while Punk was in mid-air. Hardy placed Punk on a table and dove off the top rope but Punk avoided Hardy, knocking Hardy through the table. Punk tried to climb a ladder but Hardy stopped him with a sunset flip powerbomb. Hardy tried to climb the ladder, but Punk stopped him. Punk executed a superplex onto a ladder on Hardy. Punk attempted a GTS, but Hardy countered and threw Punk through a table. Hardy tried to climb the ladder but Punk leapt off the top rope and stopped him. Hardy executed a Swanton Bomb off a ladder on Punk through a broadcast table. Back in the ring, Punk and Hardy climbed the ladder and fought until Punk knocked Hardy off the ladder and retrieved the title belt to win the match. As he was celebrating, the lights briefly went out and The Undertaker appeared, performing a chokeslam on Punk as the event ended.

== Reception ==
SummerSlam 2009 was well received. The opening match between Rey Mysterio and Dolph Ziggler was praised, with James Caldwell of Pro Wrestling Torch declaring it "awesome" and Dave Meltzer calling it a "really strong" match. The match between DX and The Legacy also received praise with Caldwell describing it as "WWE's best tag team match of the year". The main event TLC match between Punk and Hardy was universally praised. Caldwell concluded that the "drama was great, Punk was great, Hardy was great", and rated the match as 4 and a quarter stars, while Meltzer praised it as a "great match" and touted the moment when Hardy performed the Swanton Bomb on Punk from the top of the ladder as "spectacular". John Canton of TJR Wrestling gave positive response to the event giving particular praise to the tag team match between DX and The Legacy and the TLC match between Punk and Hardy, the latter of which he rated 4.5 stars out of 5, calling it "outstanding". He named the event the best WWE pay-per-view event of 2009.

All the writers criticized the WWE Championship match, however, with Caldwell saying that "WWE over-booked the crap out of this match". The shortness of the ECW Championship match was also criticized, with Caldwell remarking that it was "another ridiculous ECW Title match on WWE PPV". Aldren queried the decision to make it so short, saying that Christian and Regal "could have had one of the best matches on the show", a sentiment echoed by Meltzer. Meltzer also criticized the match between Khali and Kane, with Aldren remarking that the crowd "was dead" and Meltzer calling it "pretty bad". Caldwell said that it was a "bad match with a decent finish", as the match "lowered the bar" early enough that the "finish was intriguing".

The event received 369,000 buys, which was a decrease from the SummerSlam 2008, the previous year's event, which received a figure of 477,000 buys.

== Aftermath ==
=== Raw ===
On the following Raw, Vince McMahon gave John Cena one more chance to challenge Randy Orton for the WWE Championship at WWE Breaking Point. Since Orton had tried to retain the title by getting himself disqualified or counted out, the match was made an "I Quit" match, which also was in line with the pay per view's submission match concept. In response to Brett DiBiase's actions, McMahon also decreed that if anyone tried to interfere in the match on Orton's behalf, Orton would be stripped of the championship automatically.

After SummerSlam, The Legacy continued their antagonizing of D-Generation X; a submissions count anywhere match between the two teams was scheduled for Breaking Point.

=== SmackDown ===
On the August 27 episode of WWE Superstars, Dolph Ziggler, Mike Knox, and Finlay competed in a triple threat match with the winner advancing to challenge Rey Mysterio for the WWE Intercontinental Championship at Breaking Point; Ziggler won the match, making it his third consecutive month challenging for the title. The match was changed on the September 4 episode of SmackDown after John Morrison won the title from Mysterio (Mysterio was legitimately suspended for violating the company's wellness policy, forcing him to drop the title).

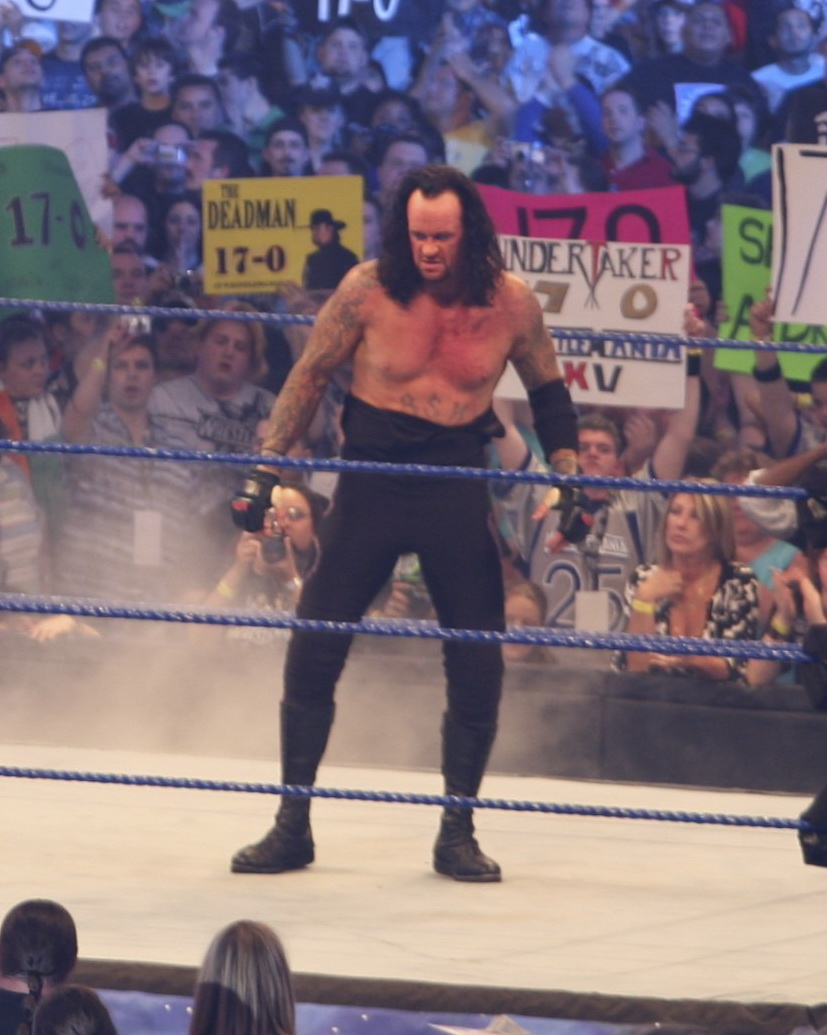
The Undertaker returned to WWE at SummerSlam and received a match for SmackDown's World Heavyweight Championship at Breaking Point against the champion CM Punk.

On the August 28 episode of SmackDown, Punk defended the World Heavyweight Championship in a Steel Cage match with a stipulation that the loser of the match would leave the company. Punk ultimately won the match, leading to the departure of Hardy from WWE. The Undertaker was chosen as Punk's opponent for Breaking Point.

The Great Khali pursued Kane after SummerSlam, while Kane avoided him. A match with legal use of Singapore canes between the two was scheduled for Breaking Point.

=== Future ===
This was the first of six consecutive SummerSlam events to be held at the Staples Center. This was also the last SummerSlam to feature ECW, as well as the ECW Championship, as the brand was disbanded in February 2010, deactivating the championship along with it.

== Results ==
No.	Results	Stipulations	Times
1^{D}	Beth Phoenix won by last eliminating Kelly Kelly and Eve Torres by pinfall (Note: The other participants were: Alicia Fox, Brie Bella, Gail Kim, Jillian Hall, Katie Lea Burchill, Layla, Maria, Melina, Mickie James, Natalya, Nikki Bella, and Rosa Mendes.)	15-Diva battle royal with Chavo Guerrero as special guest referee	6:32
2	Rey Mysterio (c) defeated Dolph Ziggler by pinfall	Singles match for the WWE Intercontinental Championship	12:25
3	Montel Vontavious Porter defeated Jack Swagger by pinfall	Singles match	8:24
4	Jeri-Show (Chris Jericho and Big Show) (c) defeated Cryme Tyme (JTG and Shad Gaspard) by pinfall	Tag team match for the Unified WWE Tag Team Championship (Note: The name "Unified WWE Tag Team Championship" referred to both the World Tag Team Championship and WWE Tag Team Championship being held and defended together, although both titles remained independently active.)	9:42
5	Kane defeated The Great Khali (with Ranjin Singh) by pinfall	Singles match	9:59
6	D-Generation X (Triple H and Shawn Michaels) defeated The Legacy (Cody Rhodes and Ted DiBiase) by pinfall	Tag team match	20:01
7	Christian (c) defeated William Regal (with Ezekiel Jackson and Vladimir Kozlov) by pinfall	Singles match for the ECW Championship	0:08
8	Randy Orton (c) defeated John Cena by pinfall	Singles match for the WWE Championship; Had Orton been counted out or disqualified for the second time, he would have lost the title.	20:45
9	CM Punk defeated Jeff Hardy (c)	Tables, Ladders, and Chairs match for the World Heavyweight Championship	21:33
(c) / – the champion(s) heading into the match; D / – this was a dark match
