= Dibiasi =

Dibiasi may refer to:

- Carlo Dibiasi (1909–1984), Italian diver who competed in the 1936 Summer Olympics
- Klaus Dibiasi (born 1947), former diver from Italy, who competed in four consecutive Summer Olympics
- Maria Dibiasi, Italian luger who competed in the early 1970s

== See also ==
- DiBiase (disambiguation)
- Di Biase, a surname
