= Million Dollar Championship =

Championship created and promoted by the American professional wrestling promotion WWE

- The Million Dollar Championship belt

Details
- Promotion: WWE
- Brand: Raw (2010); NXT (2021)
- Date established: February 15, 1989
- Date retired: August 23, 2021
Statistics
- First champion: Ted DiBiase
- Final champion: Cameron Grimes
- Most reigns: Ted DiBiase (2)
- Longest reign: Ted DiBiase (922 days)
- Shortest reign: Cameron Grimes (1 day) (Note: WWE recognizes 2 days due to tape delay.)
- Oldest champion: Virgil (40 years, 141 days)
- Youngest champion: Ted DiBiase Jr. (27 years, 147 days)
- Heaviest champion: Ted DiBiase (260 lb (120 kg))
- Lightest champion: Ted DiBiase Jr. (214 lb (97 kg))

The Million Dollar Championship was a professional wrestling championship in the American promotion WWE. The title was originally introduced in 1989 by "The Million Dollar Man" Ted DiBiase, who was unable to win or purchase the WWF Championship (now WWE Championship). In storyline, the title was an unsanctioned championship that DiBiase rarely defended. After DiBiase and Irwin R. Schyster won the WWF Tag Team Championship in 1992, the Million Dollar Championship was abandoned.

The title has since been revived on three occasions. The first was in 1996 for DiBiase's protégé, The Ringmaster, who shortly after became Stone Cold Steve Austin, but the title was abandoned after DiBiase left the promotion a few months later. In 2010, the title was revived for DiBiase's son, Ted DiBiase Jr., but was again abandoned later that same year when DiBiase Jr. returned the title to his father. The third revival came in 2021 for the NXT brand division for a storyline between DiBiase, Cameron Grimes, and LA Knight. During this time, the title was officially recognized by WWE; however, it was deactivated in August of that year when Grimes, who won the title, gave it back to DiBiase.

== History ==
=== Introduction ===
The first champion, "The Million Dollar Man" Ted DiBiase. According to the storyline, he created the title when he was unable to win the WWF Championship

The title was created during the storyline where Ted DiBiase, known as "The Million Dollar Man", was unable to win the WWF Championship (now WWE Championship), having lost the final match of the WWF Championship tournament at WrestleMania IV to Randy Savage. During the Summer of 1988, DiBiase teamed with André the Giant, in a team known as "The Mega Bucks", while chasing the WWF Championship. Still unable to win the title, DiBiase decided that if he could not win or buy the WWF Championship, he would purchase his own belt. In 1989, DiBiase unveiled a new championship belt, which he called the Million Dollar Championship. This championship was not officially sanctioned by the World Wrestling Federation (WWF), and DiBiase would rarely put his "championship" on the line in matches.

In early 1990, Jake Roberts stole the belt during his feud with DiBiase. This also led to a face turn for the Big Boss Man, who resented his manager Slick selling his services to DiBiase in order to retrieve the belt from Roberts. After attacking Roberts and stealing the bag containing the belt and Roberts' pet python named Damien, DiBiase, the Boss Man, and Slick headed for "The Brother Love Show" where DiBiase bragged about buying the Boss Man's services. The Boss Man then told both Slick and DiBiase that he could not be bought and immediately returned the bag to Roberts, who had been left handcuffed to the ring ropes. The Boss Man then released Roberts, walked back to the Brother Love set, pushed Slick, and again told an irate DiBiase that he could not be bought before walking off to the cheers of the crowd, cementing his face turn. DiBiase had his bodyguard Virgil get the belt back from Roberts at WrestleMania VI after Roberts was counted out during their match at the SkyDome.

In 1991, DiBiase's bodyguard Virgil rebelled, turned face, and challenged DiBiase at SummerSlam for the Million Dollar Championship. Virgil won the match, however, DiBiase regained the championship with the help of Repo Man at Survivor Series Showdown. When DiBiase and Irwin R. Schyster won the WWF Tag Team Championship on February 7, 1992, DiBiase abandoned the Million Dollar Championship.

=== Revivals ===
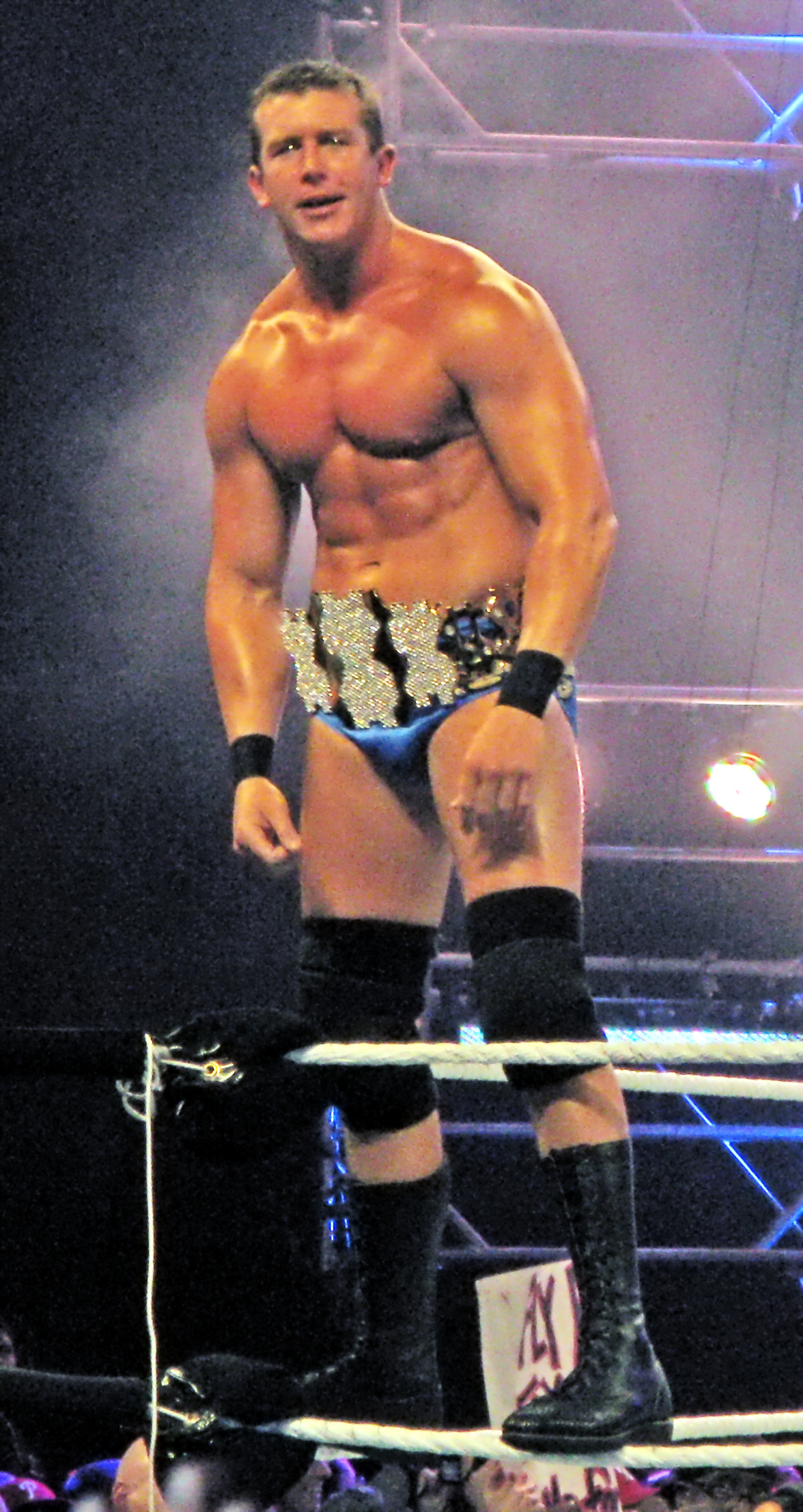
Ted DiBiase Jr. was awarded the Million Dollar Championship by his father Ted DiBiase in 2010

Ted DiBiase would later go on to award the championship to his newest protégé, The Ringmaster, on his arrival in the WWF in January 1996 (pre-taped in December 1995). The Ringmaster would shortly after become known as Stone Cold Steve Austin. After DiBiase left WWF (with the storyline reason of Austin lost a match against Savio Vega on May 28, 1996), the title was again abandoned.

In May 2002, the WWF was renamed to World Wrestling Entertainment (WWE, which became an orphaned initialism in 2011). After several years, the Million Dollar Championship reappeared on WWE television in 2009 when DiBiase, the guest host of the night, appeared on the July 6 episode of Raw, carrying the belt as he fulfilled his guest host duties. Nearly a year later, when DiBiase was inducted into the WWE Hall of Fame on March 27, 2010, he had the Million Dollar Championship belt with him. Then, on the April 5 episode of Raw, after DiBiase's son Ted DiBiase Jr. disbanded his tag team, Legacy, DiBiase Jr. came out holding the Million Dollar Championship, claiming his father had given it to him. WWE's official website confirmed the reactivation of the unsanctioned championship under DiBiase Jr.'s profile. On the October 4 episode, Goldust attacked DiBiase Jr. and gained possession of the belt. On the November 8 episode, Aksana stole the Million Dollar Championship belt from him. Goldust stole the belt back the following week and returned it to "The Million Dollar Man", who then offered to return it to his son, who rejected the offer, thus the Million Dollar Championship was again deactivated.

After more than a decade of being off television, the title was brought back in 2021 for WWE's NXT brand. On the February 10, 2021 episode of NXT, Cameron Grimes made his return from injury and claimed to have become a GameStop investor during his time away (in reference to the GameStop stock rise), thus making him the "richest man in NXT". Grimes then began a feud with DiBiase after encountering him in a jewelry store over their watches. Over the next few weeks, "The Million Dollar Man" would continue to one-up Grimes, outbidding him in various purchases. The two then had a "Million Dollar Face-Off" on the May 25 episode where LA Knight defended and allied with DiBiase. At TakeOver: In Your House Knight defeated Grimes in a Ladder Match for the title. After this, WWE added an official title history for the Million Dollar Championship to their website, thus recognizing the title as an official championship in the promotion.

During the following episode of NXT, Knight turned on and attacked DiBiase, who was saved by Grimes. Grimes then defeated Knight to win the title at TakeOver 36 on August 22. On the following episode of NXT, Grimes gave the title back to DiBiase, who said that Grimes should keep it, but DiBiase actually kept the title and instead gave Grimes a replica. In September 2021, the championship was quietly removed from WWE.com with Grimes being referred to as a former champion, thus deactivating the title with Grimes recognized as the final champion.

== Belt design ==
The Million Dollar Championship belt was designed by Terry Betteridge of Betteridge Jewelers in Greenwich, Connecticut. The center plate features three large dollar signs that are entirely filled with cubic zirconia, and there are three small diamonds on the back. The strap itself is made up of multiple metal dollar signs that go around the entire circumference of the strap; there are small hinges between each dollar sign so that the strap can go around the title holder's waist. All of the metal on the belt is gold plated. Although the belt was billed as being worth US$1,000,000, DiBiase claimed the cost was around $40,000, while Bruce Prichard claimed the cost was close to $50,000 during an episode of his podcast, Something to Wrestle with Bruce Prichard.

== Reigns ==
Over the championship's 32-year history, there were seven reigns between six champions as well as three vacancies. Ted DiBiase was the inaugural champion and had the most reigns at two. His first reign was also the longest reign at 922 days and he had the longest combined reign at 1,010 days. Cameron Grimes had the shortest reign at 1 day (2 days as recognized by WWE due to tape delay) and was the final champion. Virgil was the oldest champion, winning the title at 40 years old, while Ted DiBiase Jr. was the youngest at 27 years, 147 days old.

Key
No.	Overall reign number
Reign	Reign number for the specific champion
Days	Number of days held
Days recog.	Number of days held recognized by the promotion
†	Championship change is unrecognized by the promotion
<1	Reign lasted less than a day
+	Current reign is changing daily

No.	Champion	Championship change			Reign statistics			Notes	Ref.
No.	Champion	Date	Event	Location	Reign	Days	Days recog.	Notes	Ref.
World Wrestling Federation (WWF)
1	Ted DiBiase	February 15, 1989	Superstars of Wrestling	Binghamton, NY	1	922	905	DiBiase unveiled the title belt during a segment of The Brother Love Show. This episode aired on tape delay on March 4, 1989.	
2	Virgil	August 26, 1991	SummerSlam	New York, NY	1	77	90		
3	Ted DiBiase	November 11, 1991	Survivor Series Showdown	Utica, NY	2	88	74	This program aired on tape delay on November 24, 1991.	
—	Deactivated	February 7, 1992	House show	Denver, CO	—	—	—	Ted DiBiase abandoned the title upon winning the WWF Tag Team Championship with Irwin R. Schyster during this house show.	
4	The Ringmaster/Stone Cold Steve Austin	December 18, 1995	Raw	Newark, DE	1	162	140	Awarded the championship by Ted DiBiase during a segment of "The Brother Love Show". This episode aired on tape delay on January 8, 1996. Shortly after, The Ringmaster became known as Stone Cold Steve Austin.	
—	Deactivated	May 28, 1996	—	—	—	—	—	Stone Cold Steve Austin abandoned the title following Ted DiBiase's departure from the WWF on May 28, 1996. In May 2002, the WWF was renamed to World Wrestling Entertainment (WWE).	
World Wrestling Entertainment (WWE): Raw
5	Ted DiBiase Jr.	April 5, 2010	Raw	Moline, IL	1	224	224	Awarded the championship by his father, Ted DiBiase. WWE billed him just as Ted DiBiase.	
—	Deactivated	November 15, 2010	Raw	Hershey, PA	—	—	—	After the championship had been stolen from Ted DiBiase Jr., Goldust returned the title to Ted DiBiase, who attempted to give it back to his son, but DiBiase Jr. rejected it, thus abandoning the title.	
WWE: NXT
6	LA Knight	June 13, 2021	TakeOver: In Your House	Orlando, FL	1	70	69	Ted DiBiase reintroduced the championship on the June 8, 2021, episode of NXT. Knight defeated Cameron Grimes in a ladder match to win the revived title, which became recognized as an official championship in WWE.	
7	Cameron Grimes	August 22, 2021	TakeOver 36	Orlando, FL	1	1	2	If Grimes had lost, Ted DiBiase would have become LA Knight's butler.	
—	Deactivated	August 23, 2021	NXT	Orlando, Florida	—	—	—	Cameron Grimes relinquished the title to Ted DiBiase, which aired on tape delay on August 24, 2021, the date WWE recognizes.	

== Combined reigns ==
Rank	Wrestler	No. of reigns	Combined days	Combined days rec. by WWE
1	Ted DiBiase	2	1,010	979
2	Ted DiBiase Jr.	1	224	
3	The Ringmaster/Stone Cold Steve Austin	1	162	140
4	Virgil	1	77	90
5	LA Knight	1	70	69
6	Cameron Grimes	1	1	2

== Bibliography ==
- DiBiase, Ted; Caiazzo, Tom (2008). Ted DiBiase: The Million Dollar Man. New York, NY: Pocket Books. ISBN 978-1-4165-5890-3.
