= Brett DiBiase =

American professional wrestler

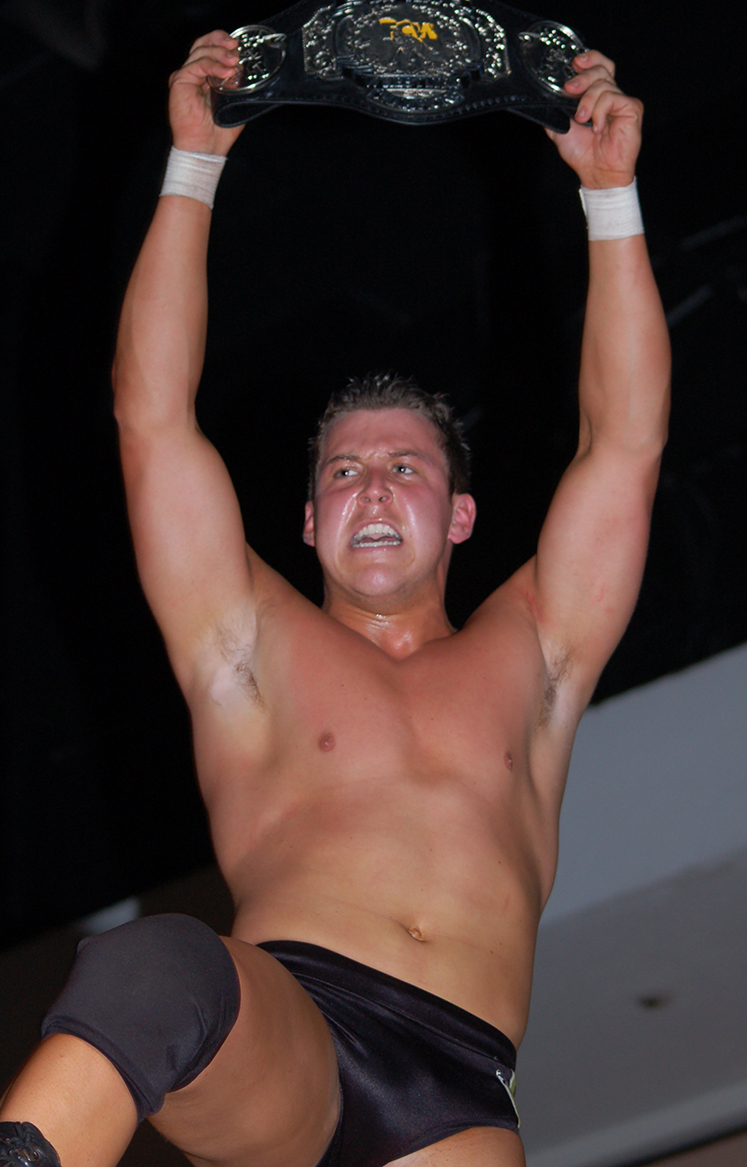
- DiBiase in 2010

Personal information
- Born: March 16, 1988 (age 38) Clinton, Mississippi, U.S.
- Spouse: Leah May (m. 2009)
- Family: Mike DiBiase (grandfather); Helen Hild (grandmother); Ted DiBiase (father); Mike DiBiase (half-brother); Ted DiBiase Jr. (brother)

Professional wrestling career
- Ring name: Brett DiBiase
- Billed height: 6 ft 0 in (1.83 m)
- Billed weight: 219 lb (99 kg)
- Billed from: West Palm Beach, Florida; Jackson, Mississippi
- Trained by: Florida Championship Wrestling
- Debut: July 22, 2008
- Retired: August 2011

Brett DiBiase (born March 16, 1988) is an American retired professional wrestler and professional wrestling referee. He is best known for his time in Florida Championship Wrestling, WWE's developmental territory. He is a former FCW Florida Tag Team Champion with Joe Hennig as The Fortunate Sons.

DiBiase is a third-generation professional wrestler. His grandmother Helen Hild and adoptive grandfather Iron Mike DiBiase were professional wrestlers, as was his father, "The Million Dollar Man" Ted DiBiase. DiBiase's older brothers, Mike and Ted Jr., were also professional wrestlers.

In December 2020, he pleaded guilty to making fraudulent statements concerning a role in the Mississippi welfare funds scandal, and received a $48,000 fine. In March 2023, he would also plead guilty in federal court to conspiracy to defraud the United States government and is awaiting his sentence.

== Professional wrestling career ==
DiBiase made his debut for World Wrestling Entertainment (WWE)'s developmental territory, Florida Championship Wrestling (FCW), in mid-2008. On August 19, DiBiase defeated Sheamus O'Shaunessy, but was defeated by Stu Sanders the following week. Throughout the end of the year, he continued wrestling in FCW, competing against wrestlers including Gavin Spears, Dolph Ziggler, and Sinn Bowdee.

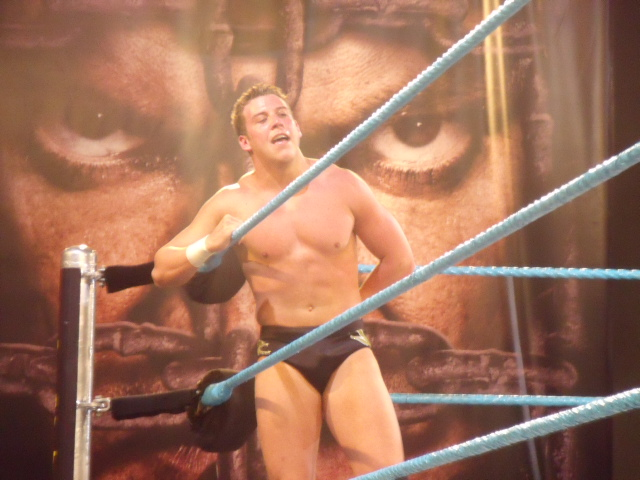
DiBiase in FCW in 2009.

In early 2009, DiBiase competed sporadically for FCW, although he teamed regularly with fellow multi-generation wrestler, Maverick Darsow, in February. He also competed in both tag team and singles matches, and defeated Byron Saxton in late March. DiBiase made his FCW television debut on the May 17, 2009, episode, defeating Dylan Klein. A few weeks later, DiBiase competed in a battle royal to become the number one contender for the FCW Florida Heavyweight Championship, but was eliminated. On the June 7 episode of FCW, DiBiase lost to Klein, starting a scripted rivalry between the two. They competed against each other on numerous occasions throughout June, July and August.

At WWE's SummerSlam pay-per-view in August 2009, DiBiase made an appearance as a planted fan in the audience, interfering in the WWE Championship match between Randy Orton and John Cena. The following night, on August 24, DiBiase made his debut on Raw, appearing in backstage segments with The Legacy faction consisting of Orton, Cody Rhodes and his older brother Ted. According to DiBiase in a 2023 interview, a knee injury caused his future plans to appear on main roster programming to be scrapped.

After his appearance on Raw, he returned to FCW, where he formed a tag team with Joe Hennig known as The Fortunate Sons. On January 14, 2010, at an FCW television taping, The Fortunate Sons won the FCW Florida Tag Team Championship by defeating The Dudebusters (Caylen Croft, Trent Barreta and Curt Hawkins). On March 13, The Fortunate Sons lost the titles to The Uso Brothers (Jimmy and Jules). At the April 8 FCW television tapings, Hennig blamed DiBiase for the loss, and in a match the two fought to a double disqualification. At an FCW event on April 29, DiBiase faced Hennig again, but suffered a knee injury during the match. He underwent surgery for a torn anterior cruciate ligament on May 18. During his rehabilitation time, DiBiase joined the commentary team for FCW's television program.

In May 2011 it was reported that DiBiase had begun to train as a referee due to on-going problems with his knee. On August 22, DiBiase's father revealed that due to continuing knee problems after four surgeries, DiBiase had decided not to continue a career in professional wrestling. According to his father, DiBiase was to be released from his contract at the end of the month.

== Personal life ==
DiBiase is a third-generation wrestler. His grandfather "Iron" Mike DiBiase and his grandmother Helen Hild were professional wrestlers, as was his father Ted DiBiase. Both his older half brother, Mike, and his older full brother, Ted Jr., are also professional wrestlers. On March 27, 2010, DiBiase and his brother Ted Jr. inducted their father into the WWE Hall of Fame. DiBiase married his high school sweetheart Leah May in June 2009.

== Mississippi welfare funds scandal ==
DiBiase was arrested February 5, 2020, by the State Auditors Office of Mississippi in connection with a multimillion-dollar embezzlement scheme. The indictments included a range of violations involving fraud and embezzlement. On December 17, he pleaded guilty to one count of making a false statement, for which he was fined $48,000.

In December 2020, DiBiase pleaded guilty to making fraudulent statements about a welfare fund scheme and paid $5,000 in restitution. He also was found to have accepted a $48,000 contract from Mississippi's state welfare agency for work he did not perform because he was in a luxury rehab facility in Malibu, California. An audit showed that all payments to the DiBiase family, namely DiBiase, his father and brother Ted DiBiase Jr., were indicative of fraud, waste or abuse. In May 2022, the Mississippi Department of Human Services sued DiBiase, his father and brother, retired NFL quarterback Brett Favre, and several others to recover more than $20 million in money "squandered" from the Temporary Assistance for Needy Families anti-poverty program. On March 2, 2023, DiBiase pleaded guilty to one federal charge of conspiracy to defraud the United States and faces up to five years in prison. As of January 2026, DiBiase has yet to be sentenced for this charge, and still awaits his sentencing hearing. On February 25, 2026, during his brother Ted DiBiase Jr.'s criminal trial, former director of the Mississippi Department of Human Services John Davis, the highest ranking official indicted in the Mississippi welfare fraud scandal and who in 2022 received a 90 year prison sentence for his role in the scandal, provided text messages confirming how he got close to the two DiBiase, including establishing a very close relationship with Brett DiBiase. Brett at one point in 2018 told Davis "It's only when I'm with you I fell safe enough to sleep," and on another occasion told Davis "I will freaking die for you."

== Championships and accomplishments ==
- Florida Championship Wrestling
  - FCW Florida Tag Team Championship (1 time) – with Joe Hennig
- Pride Premier Wrestling
  - PPW Heavyweight Championship (1 time)
- Pro Wrestling Illustrated
  - PWI ranked him #164 of the top 500 singles wrestlers in the PWI 500 in 2010
