= Ted DiBiase Jr. =

American professional wrestler (born 1982)

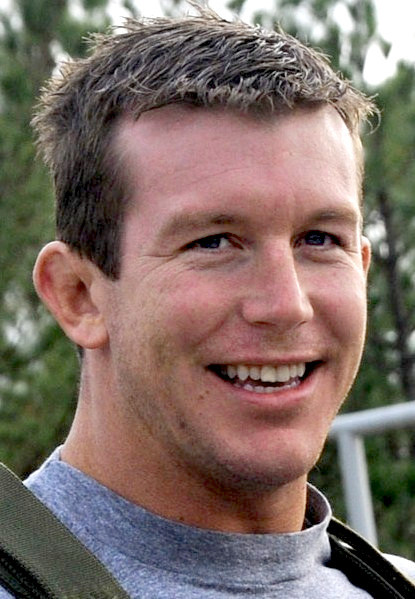
- DiBiase in 2011

Personal information
- Born: Theodore Marvin DiBiase Jr. November 8, 1982 (age 43) Baton Rouge, Louisiana, U.S.
- Education: Mississippi College
- Spouse: Kristen DiBiase (m. 2008)
- Children: Two
- Family: Iron Mike DiBiase (grandfather); Helen Hild (grandmother); Ted DiBiase (father); Mike DiBiase (half-brother); Brett DiBiase (brother)

Professional wrestling career
- Ring name(s): Ted DiBiase; Ted DiBiase Jr.
- Billed height: 6 ft 3 in (191 cm)
- Billed weight: 214 lb (97 kg)
- Billed from: Madison, Mississippi; West Palm Beach, Florida
- Trained by: Chris Youngblood; Harley Race's Wrestling Academy
- Debut: 2006
- Retired: 2017

Theodore Marvin DiBiase Jr. (born November 8, 1982) is an American retired professional wrestler and actor. He is best known for his tenure in WWE and role in the Mississippi welfare funds scandal for which he was acquitted.

Part of the DiBiase wrestling family, he was trained by Chris Youngblood and Harley Race's Wrestling Academy and debuted in 2006. He won the Fusion Pro Tag Team Championship with his brother Mike DiBiase in February 2007, and also toured Japan with Pro Wrestling Noah. He signed a developmental contract with WWE in July 2007, and was assigned to their developmental facility, Florida Championship Wrestling (FCW), where he won the FCW Southern Heavyweight Championship in December 2007. Due to injury, he relinquished the championship in January 2008. He made his WWE television debut on May 26, 2008, and quickly formed a tag team with Cody Rhodes. The duo won the World Tag Team Championship twice before forming The Legacy faction alongside Randy Orton. Following The Legacy's dissolution, DiBiase moved into singles competition and received the Million Dollar Championship from his father Ted DiBiase.

DiBiase left WWE in 2013 due to family commitments and other business pursuits. He continued to wrestle on the independent circuit until 2017. In 2020, he officially announced his retirement.

From January to March 2026, DiBiase was tried for 13 criminal counts related to potential misappropriation of Mississippi state welfare funds. On March 20, 2026, he was acquitted of all charges.

== Early life ==
DiBiase was born on November 8, 1982, in Baton Rouge, Louisiana, and was raised in Clinton, Mississippi. He knew fellow professional wrestler Christie Ricci as a child, as they attended a Sunday school class together. He graduated from Clinton High School in 2001. At Clinton, DiBiase was the football team's starting quarterback.

DiBiase enrolled at Mississippi College in Clinton and was a starting wide receiver for Mississippi College's football team before leaving the squad following his freshman season. He also played soccer in college, and received awards in both sports. He graduated in 2005 with a Bachelor of Science and Bachelor of Business Administration. During his time in college, DiBiase considered becoming a minister.

== Professional wrestling career ==
=== Early career (2006–2007) ===
DiBiase and his older brother Mike DiBiase, received professional wrestling training from Chris Youngblood in Amarillo, Texas, before going to train at Harley Race's Wrestling Academy. The DiBiase brothers made their professional wrestling debut on July 8, 2006, for World League Wrestling (WLW), the promotion run by Harley Race in Eldon, Missouri, in conjunction with the Wrestling Academy. On February 17, 2007, they won the Fusion Pro Tag Team Championship by defeating Raheem Rashaad and Juntsi.

In early 2007, DiBiase also wrestled on tours in Japan for Pro Wrestling Noah, where he competed against wrestlers including the former GHC Junior Heavyweight Champion, KENTA.

=== World Wrestling Entertainment / WWE (2007–2013) ===
==== Florida Championship Wrestling (2007–2008) ====
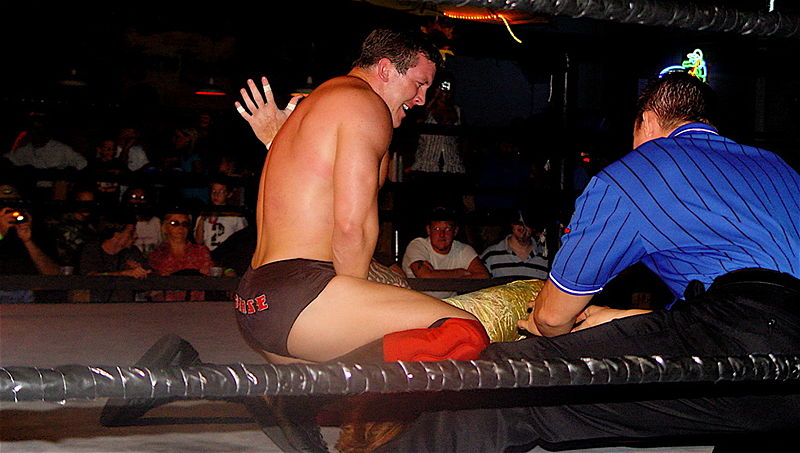
DiBiase wrestling at a Florida Championship Wrestling show.

In July 2007, DiBiase signed a developmental deal with World Wrestling Entertainment (WWE) and debuted in their training territory Florida Championship Wrestling (FCW). He made his FCW debut on August 4 in a tag team match, in which he and Jake Hager defeated Keith Walker and Heath Miller. In October, DiBiase became a member of the Next Generation Hart Foundation faction alongside Harry Smith, TJ Wilson, Nattie Neidhart, and Teddy Hart. He quickly separated from the group, however, and gained Maryse as a valet. On December 18, 2007, DiBiase defeated TJ Wilson to win the FCW Southern Heavyweight Championship in New Port Richey, Florida. DiBiase, however, was unable to defend it due to an injury sustained, so he awarded the championship to his partner Heath Miller on January 19, 2008. As of March 2008, DiBiase had suffered from a multitude of injuries including sciatica, a fractured left knee, separated ribs, broken finger, and bone spurs in his elbow. Due to these injuries, DiBiase competed sporadically in FCW for the next few months, competing in both tag team and singles competition.

==== The Legacy (2008–2010) ====
DiBiase made his WWE television debut as a villain on the May 26, 2008 episode of Raw, where he cut a promo about his intent to become a champion like his father, Ted DiBiase Sr., challenging the World Tag Team Champions, Cody Rhodes and Hardcore Holly. At the Night of Champions pay-per-view on June 29, DiBiase won the World Tag Team Championship in his first match in WWE, after Rhodes betrayed Holly, revealing himself to be DiBiase's partner. After holding the title for just over a month, they dropped it to John Cena and Batista on the August 4 episode of Raw. The following week, DiBiase and Rhodes used their rematch clause to defeat Batista and Cena to regain the titles.

DiBiase and Rhodes were soon joined by Manu, forming a stable of multi-generation superstars. On the October 27 episode of Raw, DiBiase and Rhodes lost their title to CM Punk and Kofi Kingston. It was during this time that Randy Orton became linked to Rhodes, DiBiase, and Manu on television, criticizing them in a mentor-type role. On the November 3 episode of Raw, DiBiase was attacked by Orton, after he interfered in Orton's match. This storyline attack was to allow DiBiase to be written out of WWE storylines, so he could film the direct-to-video movie, The Marine 2.

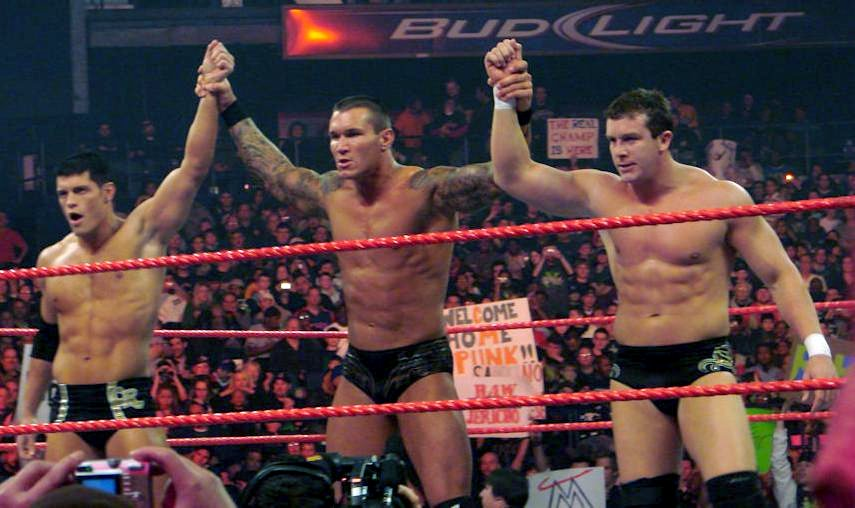
DiBiase (right) as a member of The Legacy with Randy Orton (center) and Cody Rhodes (left)

On the January 12, 2009, episode of Raw, DiBiase returned to aid Manu and Sim Snuka in attacking Cody Rhodes and Randy Orton. Instead, however, DiBiase turned on them and helped Rhodes and Orton assault Manu and Snuka, thus joining The Legacy faction. As part of The Legacy, DiBiase entered the Royal Rumble match at the Royal Rumble on January 25 in order to help Orton win, and lasted until the final four, before being eliminated by Triple H. Rhodes and DiBiase became involved in Orton's scripted rivalry with the McMahon family, helping him to attack Shane and Stephanie McMahon, and Stephanie's real-life husband, Triple H. DiBiase was also elevated to main event status as a result of joining The Legacy, competing in handicap and six-man tag team matches, as well as the occasional singles match against Orton's opponents and rivals. On April 26, at the Backlash pay-per-view, DiBiase, Rhodes, and Orton defeated Triple H, Batista, and Shane McMahon in a six-man tag team match, which, per the pre-match stipulation, resulted in Orton winning the WWE Championship. During WWE's tour of Australia in early July, DiBiase suffered an arm injury, but did not miss any time because of it. Throughout mid-2009, DiBiase and Rhodes continued to compete against and attack Orton's rivals, particularly Triple H, preventing him from earning a match for Orton's championship. As a result, Triple H reformed D-Generation X (DX) with Shawn Michaels and they defeated DiBiase and Rhodes at SummerSlam on August 23. DiBiase and Rhodes later defeated DX in a submissions count anywhere match at the Breaking Point pay-per-view on September 13, before losing to DX in a Hell in a Cell match at the Hell in a Cell pay-per-view on October 4.

Tension between the members of The Legacy began building, when Orton attacked DiBiase and Rhodes for accidentally costing him a chance to win the WWE Championship at the Royal Rumble pay-per-view on January 31, 2010. On the February 1 episode of Raw, DiBiase defeated Mark Henry in an Elimination Chamber qualifying match, earning a chance to win the WWE Championship. At the Elimination Chamber pay-per-view on February 21, he eliminated Orton from the Elimination Chamber match, but was eliminated by Kofi Kingston soon after. On the February 22 episode of Raw, Orton turned on The Legacy, believing they had a plan to turn on him, and in retaliation, they attacked Orton the following week. As a result, the three competed in a triple threat match at WrestleMania XXVI on March 28 in which Orton defeated Rhodes and DiBiase.

==== Million Dollar Champion (2010–2011) ====
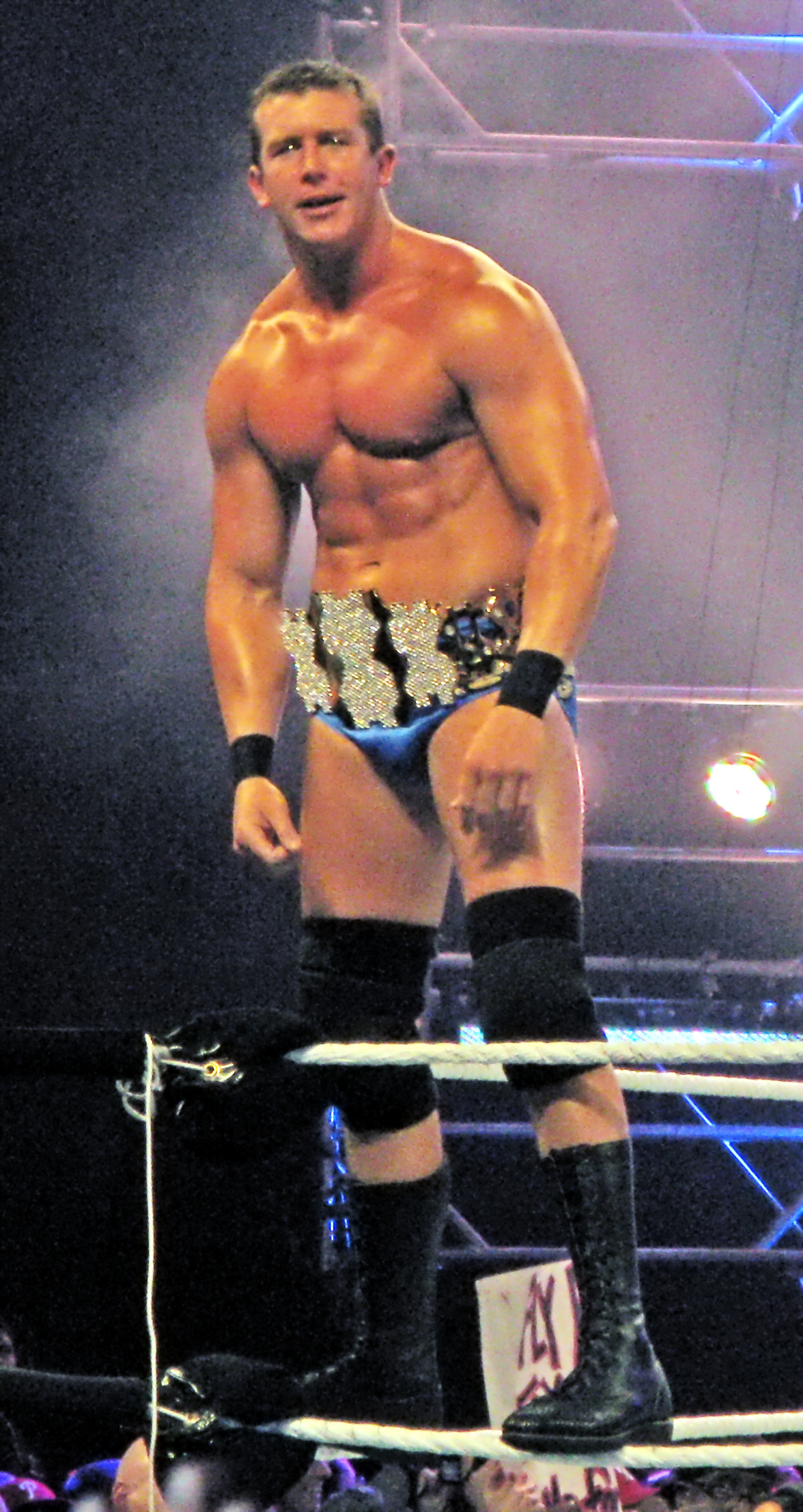
DiBiase as the Million Dollar Champion

After WrestleMania, DiBiase debuted a new gimmick of an arrogant millionaire, similar to his father's old gimmick. On the April 5 episode of Raw, DiBiase was given possession of the Million Dollar Championship and access to a trust fund by his father. DiBiase then began looking for a "Virgil", a manservant like his father used to have. He offered the position to R-Truth, who refused, provoking a feud between the two. On the May 17 episode of Raw, DiBiase revealed his "Virgil"—the original Virgil who had worked for his father. In his first singles pay-per-view match at Over the Limit on May 23, DiBiase was defeated by R-Truth. During the match, DiBiase suffered a concussion, but was able to appear on Raw the following night. On the June 21 episode of Raw, DiBiase fired Virgil in favor of the managerial services of his on-screen girlfriend Maryse. In September, DiBiase entered in a feud with Goldust over the Million Dollar Championship, after Goldust stole the title from him. On the November 15 episode of Raw, Goldust returned the Million Dollar Championship belt to DiBiase Sr., who then offered to give it back to his son, but he refused the offer, proclaiming that he was interested in another belt. Later in the night DiBiase attacked WWE United States Champion Daniel Bryan, setting up a match at Survivor Series on November 21 for the championship, in which he was unsuccessful. DiBiase was a Pro for the fourth season of NXT, in which he and Maryse mentored Brodus Clay. On the January 25, 2011, episode of NXT, Clay traded DiBiase for Alberto Del Rio as his Pro.

As part of the 2011 supplemental draft on April 26, DiBiase was drafted to the SmackDown brand. In his first match on SmackDown, DiBiase lost to his former tag team partner Cody Rhodes. The following week, DiBiase was accompanied to the ring by Rhodes. On the June 3 episode of SmackDown, DiBiase lost to former rival, Daniel Bryan via submission. After the match, Rhodes and DiBiase attacked Bryan, but were stopped by Sin Cara. On the July 8 episode of SmackDown, DiBiase teamed with Rhodes in a winning effort against the team of Bryan and Ezekiel Jackson. After DiBiase lost a match against Randy Orton on the August 26 episode of SmackDown, Rhodes attacked him, ending their association.

==== The DiBiase Posse (2011–2013) ====
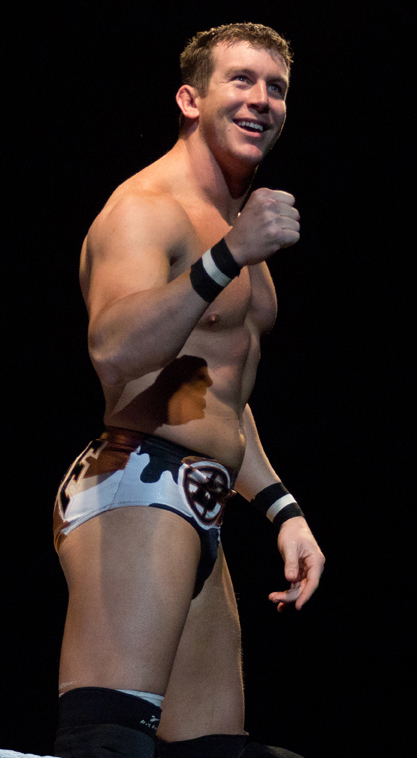
DiBiase at a house show in 2012

On the September 16 episode of SmackDown, as Rhodes was ridiculing the audience, DiBiase disguised himself as a fan by wearing a paper bag on his head before attacking Rhodes, turning into a fan favorite. DiBiase then challenged Rhodes for the WWE Intercontinental Championship at Night of Champions on September 18, but was unsuccessful. In a YouTube video published on September 22, DiBiase introduced his new gimmick to hold tailgating parties with fans just before WWE events, terming those who tailgated with him as the "DiBiase Posse"; DiBiase also acknowledged that mimicking his father's rich gimmick "didn't really work out".

In November 2011, Jinder Mahal chastised DiBiase about forsaking his wealthy upbringing to hang out with commoners, starting a feud and leading to DiBiase defeating Mahal on the December 9 episode of SmackDown. Three weeks later, Mahal defeated DiBiase to conclude the feud. In January 2012, Hunico started a feud with DiBiase when Hunico was offended that he was not invited to one of DiBiase's Posse parties. Both traded victories in regular singles matches on SmackDown, with DiBiase wrestling despite a wrist injury. Although DiBiase beat Hunico in a flag match, Hunico cheated to win the last match in the series in February. On March 6, DiBiase suffered a broken ankle during television tapings. That same month, DiBiase announced that he was undergoing shoulder surgery. DiBiase returned on September 16 at Night of Champions, participating in the pre-show WWE United States Championship number one contender battle royal, but was eliminated by Tensai. DiBiase's only televised match in 2013 saw him defeat Michael McGillicutty on the May 9 episode of Superstars. On August 26, after suffering from depression and anxiety, DiBiase announced that he was not renewing his WWE contract, which expired on September 1.

=== Independent circuit (2013–2017) ===
DiBiase made his first wrestling appearance since leaving WWE on October 12, 2013, in the opening round of Family Wrestling Entertainment's Grand Prix tournament, defeating Colt Cabana. On October 18, 2013, DiBiase was announced to appear at Tommy Dreamer's House of Hardcore 3. At the event, he participated in a pre-show meet and greet. After that, he did not wrestle again until he had two matches for Mississippi-based promotion Pro Wrestling EGO in 2016 and 2017.

== Personal life ==
DiBiase is a third-generation professional wrestler. His grandfather Iron Mike DiBiase, his grandmother Helen Hild and his father Mid South and Georgia wrestling star Ted DiBiase were professional wrestlers. His older half-brother Mike and his younger full brother Brett are also former professional wrestlers. On March 27, 2010, DiBiase and his brother Brett inducted their father into the WWE Hall of Fame. DiBiase married his high school sweetheart, Kristen, a nurse, on October 30, 2008. DiBiase and his wife have a son who was born in 2012, and a daughter born in 2018.

On February 15, 2008, DiBiase was arrested for DUI in Hillsborough County, Florida, after his Cadillac sport utility vehicle crashed into another vehicle. No one was seriously injured in the crash, but DiBiase failed a field sobriety test, and when breathalysed, was found to have a blood alcohol level of 0.137–0.138. He was released later that day on a $500.00 bail bond.

DiBiase is a Christian evangelist and is a practicing motivational speaker. On August 3, 2019, he served as the commencement speaker during graduation ceremonies at his alma mater Mississippi College.

=== Philanthropy ===
In May 2012, DiBiase started his own non-profit organization, the Ted DiBiase Foundation. As part of the foundation, individuals with life-threatening illnesses or disabilities were offered the chance to meet DiBiase at WWE live events, and further programs for youth leadership and community causes are being developed. He also participates in programs as a leader for the Heart of David Ministry.

When DiBiase left WWE, he took up an executive position with CollegeGarageSale.com, a college textbook e-commerce website. He is now the vice president of business development for One Life. In 2021 he, alongside Jared Ashley and David Kellerco founded a marketing and branding company called 16 Creative.

=== Mississippi welfare funds scandal ===
In May 2022, the Mississippi Department of Human Services sued DiBiase, his father, and several others to recover more than $20 million in money "squandered" from the Temporary Assistance for Needy Families anti-poverty program. He was also found to have played a major role in benefiting from speaking engagements which aided the controversy, with his companies Priceless Ventures LLC and Familiae Orientem receiving more than $3 million from nonprofit groups between 2017 and 2019.

On April 20, 2023, the U.S. Department of Justice released a statement relating to the scandal indicting DiBiase with one count of conspiracy to commit wire fraud and to commit theft concerning programs receiving federal funds, six counts of wire fraud, two counts of theft concerning programs receiving federal funds, and four counts of money laundering. If convicted, he faces a maximum penalty of five years behind bars for the conspiracy count, a maximum penalty of 20 years behind bars for each wire fraud count, and a maximum penalty of 10 years behind bars for each count of theft concerning programs receiving federal funds and for each count of money laundering.

DiBiase's criminal trial began at the Thad Cochran United States Courthouse on January 7, 2026. However, on January 20, one of his attorneys sought a mistrial, citing ongoing health issues of lead defense lawyer Scott Gilbert. Judge Carlton Reeves delayed the trial until February 23, but denied requests for further delays or a mistrial. When the trial resumed, former Mississippi Department of Human Services Director John Davis testified, presenting text messages that confirmed his close relationship with DiBiase and his brother Brett, and showing that he had told the two brothers he would do anything to help them. In addition to Davis, former Family Resource Center head Christi Webb and Mississippi Community Education Center Nancy New would also testify in late February 2026, with Webb and New confirming that their organizations issued contracts to DiBiase and that he received money despite not fulfilling contract obligations and at best delivering one list and nothing else. Davis would back Webb and New's testimonies and also acknowledged that he, out of a need to friendship with DiBiase, personally ordered Webb's organization to dole out money to him. Like Davis, Webb and New have previously pleaded guilty to their roles in the welfare fraud scandal.

On March 4, 2026, Mississippi Department of Human Services employee Bridget Bell testified that she found state accounting system records which showed that there were $900,000 in expenses at DiBiase's leadership program for a lavish gala, flowers, food, beverages and Polo jackets, while former John Davis executive assistant Zola Harelson testified that he had an office at the Mississippi Department of Human Services headquarters in Jackson, despite not being a state employee, and even a state-issued cellphone. The same day, it was announced that DiBiase's trial would not resume until March 16, 2026. On March 16, 2026, DiBiase's trial would resume as scheduled. On this day, Kelly Kiker, chief information officer at BankPlus, would give testimony and verify checks and deposit slips which DiBiase had previously deposited through BankPlus branches in Madison and Rankin counties in 2018. Among these deposits made by DiBiase included a check for more than $1 million at a Rankin County-based BankPlus on May 3, 2018. FBI forensic accountant Matthew Ackerman, who investigated the matter, would also confirm that from 2017 to 2019, $2.9 million in federal welfare money had managed to successfully transferred into two companies owned by DiBiase, with DiBiase spending $1.4 million on a new home, and more of this welfare money also being spent on things such as a new boat and tractor. In his testimony, former Mississippi Department Health and Human Services chief legal counsel Earl Scales also noted that the amount of contracts DiBiase was given was against manual policy, though he also noted he was at the time not given the authority to review the contracts. It was also announced that the prosecution was now wrapping up their case against DiBiase.

On March 17, 2026, the prosecution would rest. The same day, the defense would once again file a motion to dismiss the case, only to once again have this motion dismissed Judge Reeves. The defense then began calling witnesses, with Alabama software developer Kevin MacLeod being the first witness to testify on behalf of the defense. DiBiase's defense was scheduled to call at least two witnesses. On March 18, 2026, the presiding judge informed the trial's jury that DiBiase's trial was close to its end. The same day, the defense called its second witness, New Orleans-based consultant Matt Theriot. After calling four witnesses over a period of two days, DiBiase's defense would rest its case on March 18, with DiBiase not testifying. While rebutting the defense, the prosecution would present a text message which contradicted defense witness Nicholas Coughlin and showed that DiBiase had in fact planned on pretending to not know how to form an LLC group. On March 19, 2026, Judge Reeves would read jury instructions, with attorneys for both the prosecution and the defense delivering that day as well.

Jury deliberations began March 20, 2026. The same day, DiBiase would be acquitted on all charges. DiBiase Jr. would be the first, and potentially only, defendant in the Mississippi welfare funds scandal whose case resulted in a criminal trial. The other remaining defendants in the scandal who were criminally charged have pleaded guilty and had agreed to aid the prosecution.

== Filmography ==
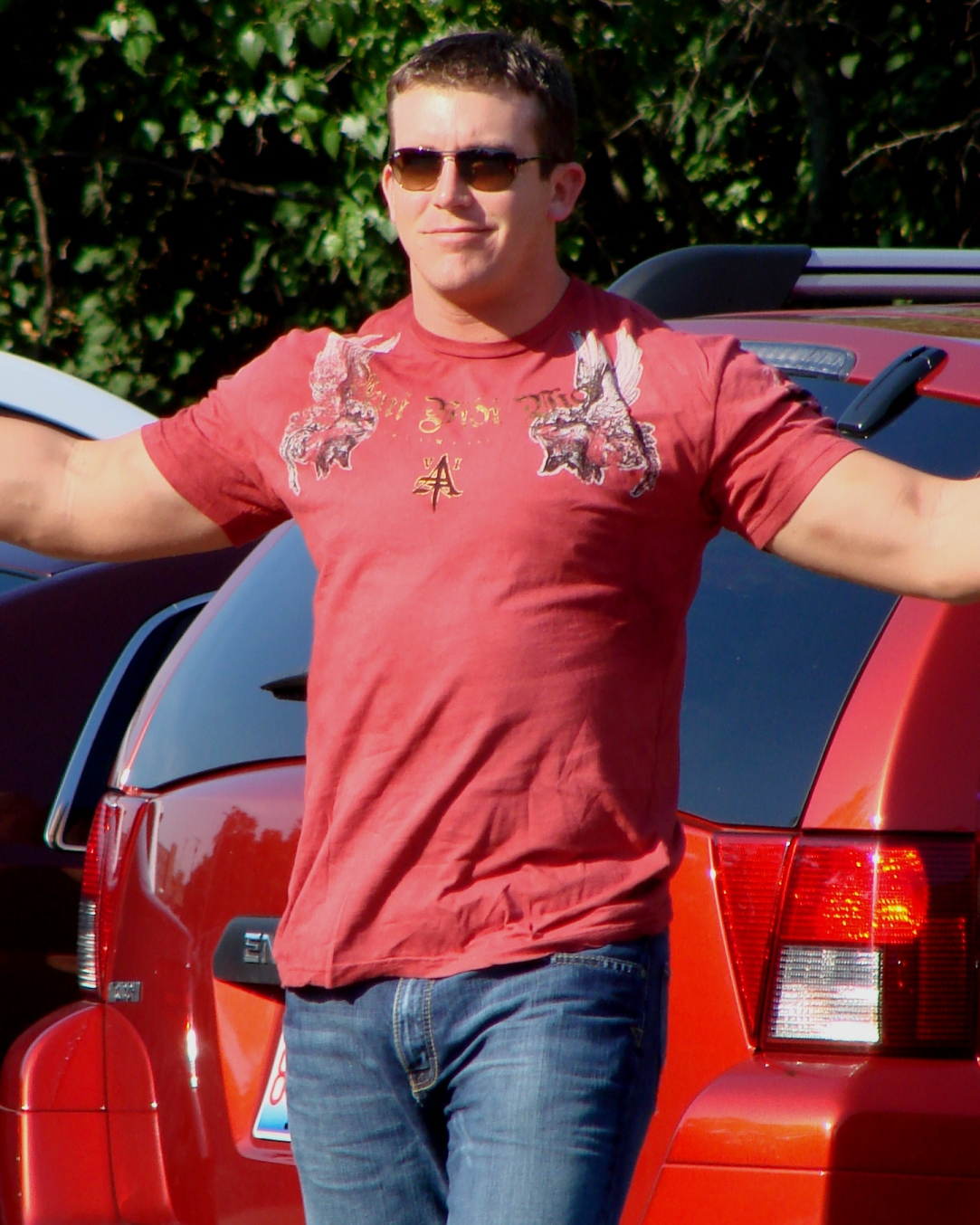
DiBiase at Valparaiso University in August 2008.

In late 2008, DiBiase began filming the movie The Marine 2, in which he plays the main character, Joe Linwood. The Marine 2 is a direct-to-DVD-and-Blu-ray project, and was released on December 29, 2009. The film was DiBiase's first acting experience, and he spent six weeks in Thailand for filming. For the movie, DiBiase performed all his own stunts, which resulted in him separating the cartilage between two of his ribs during a fight scene.

On August 26, 2009, DiBiase appeared on the late-night talk show The Tonight Show with Conan O'Brien along with Cody Rhodes, The Great Khali, and Big Show.

DiBiase made his video game debut in WWE SmackDown vs. RAW 2009, he made subsequent appearances in WWE SmackDown vs. RAW 2010, WWE SmackDown vs. RAW 2011, WWE All Stars, WWE '12 and his final appearance was in WWE '13.

== Championships and accomplishments ==
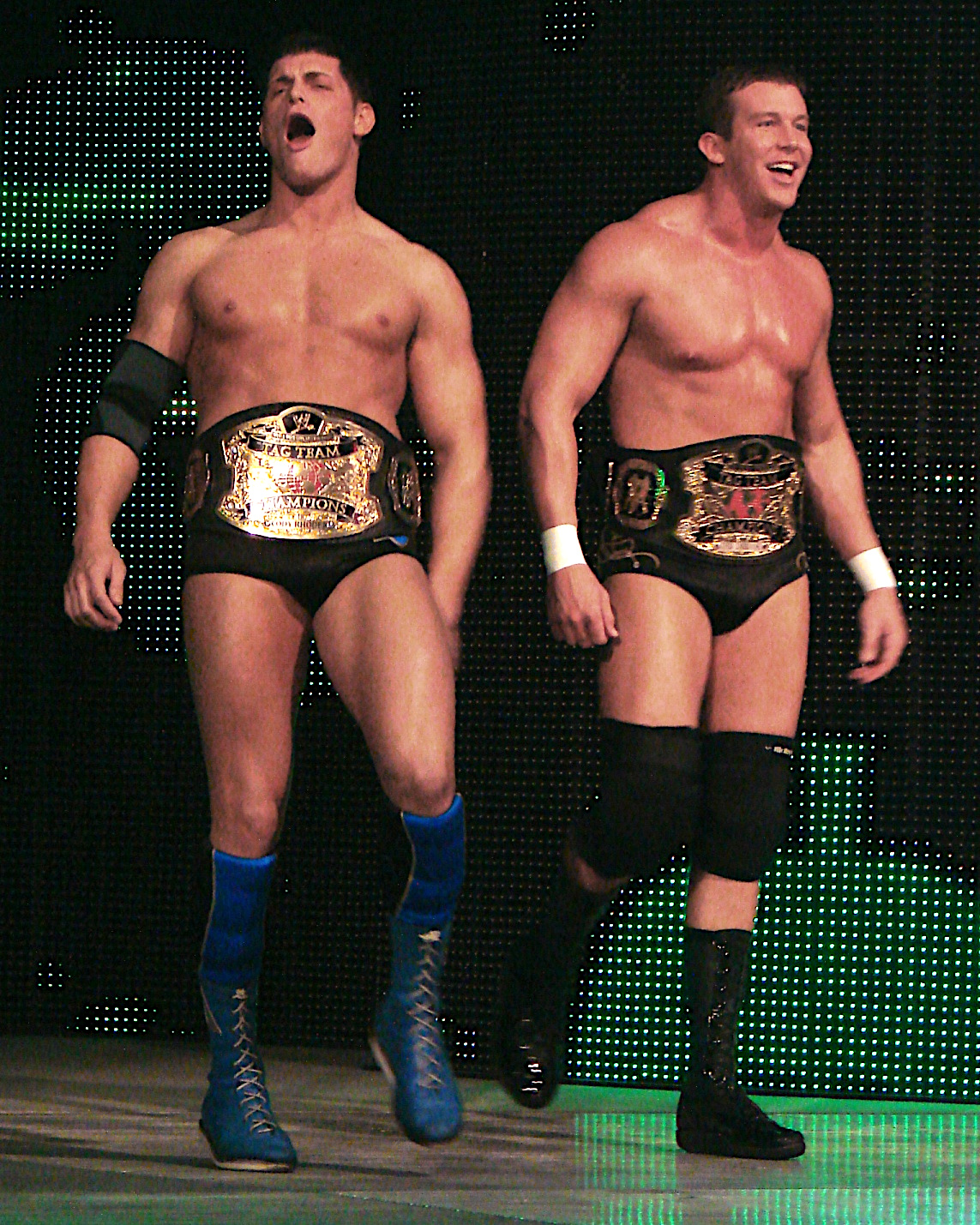
DiBiase and Cody Rhodes as World Tag Team Champions

- Florida Championship Wrestling
  - FCW Southern Heavyweight Championship (1 time)
- Fusion Pro Wrestling
  - Fusion Pro Tag Team Championship (1 time) – with Mike DiBiase II
- Pro Wrestling Illustrated
  - Ranked No. 34 of the best 500 singles wrestlers in the PWI 500 in 2010
- World Wrestling Entertainment
  - Million Dollar Championship (1 time)
  - World Tag Team Championship (2 times) – with Cody Rhodes
