= David Di Biase =

British dentist

David Domenic Di Biase
- Born: 1935; Kingston, Surrey, United Kingdom.
- Died: 30 June 2001 (aged 66)
- Education: King's College London School of Medicine and Dentistry
- Known for: Inventor of the Southend Clasp
- Relatives: Moyra (wife); Judy (daughter); Andrew (son); James(son)
- Medical career
- Profession: Dentist
- Institutions: Royal Air Force; Southend Hospital; Barts and The London, Queen Mary's School of Medicine and Dentistry
- Sub-specialties: Orthodontics
- Research: Cleft lip and palate
- Awards: Chapman Prize; Clifford Ballard Medal

David Domenic Di Biase (1935–2001) was a British dentist. He was best known for developing, together with Arthur Levis (1927–2000), Chief Dental Technician at Southend General Hospital, the Southend Clasp, a widely used retention component used on removable orthodontic appliances.

== Education ==
Di Biase studied dentistry at King's College London School of Medicine and Dentistry. He graduated with Honours, followed by a short Service Commission in the Royal Air Force between 1961 and 1963. On completion he obtained his Fellowship and Diploma in Orthodontics. During his senior registrar training he won the prestigious Chapman Prize.

== Dental career ==
In 1971 he was appointed Consultant Orthodontist at Southend Hospital. He relinquished sessions in Southend in 1989 to join the teaching staff in the Orthodontic Department at Barts and The London, Queen Mary's School of Medicine and Dentistry.

He gained a significant reputation, publishing and lecturing widely on orthodontics, and developing ideas such as ‘The Southend Clasp’, which is now in wide use throughout the speciality. His other particular interest was in dento-facial orthopaedics for cleft neonates.

Besides his clinical commitments, he played an important political role in dentistry. His overwhelming passion was to see the divided orthodontic speciality in the United Kingdom united under one organisation. To this end he acted as ‘midwife’ to the developing British Orthodontic Society (BOS). He was the first chairman of conference and followed as first chairman of the newly constituted British Orthodontic Society and later as president. He was also secretary and president of the Essex branch of the British Dental Association.

David also served on national organisations, being an elected member of the General Dental Council and he sat on the Standing Dental Advisory Committee Orthodontic Review Group.

In his personal life Di Biase had three passions, his family, art and rugby football. As a rugby player he played for ‘King’s College Hospital', ‘Saracens’ and the Royal Air Force.
