= Iron Mike DiBiase =

American professional wrestler (1923–1969)

Personal information
- Born: Michael DiBiase; December 24, 1923 Omaha, Nebraska, U.S.
- Died: July 2, 1969 (aged 45) Lubbock, Texas, U.S.
- Spouse: Helen Hild (m. 1958)
- Children: Ted DiBiase (adopted son)
- Family: Ted DiBiase Jr. (adopted grandson); Mike DiBiase (adopted grandson); Brett DiBiase (adopted grandson)

Professional wrestling career
- Ring name(s): Mike DiBiase; Miguel Lopez
- Billed height: 6 ft 0 in (183 cm)
- Billed weight: 230 lb (104 kg)
- Billed from: Italy
- Debut: 1950

Michael DiBiase (December 24, 1923 – July 2, 1969) was an American professional wrestler also known by his ring name "Iron" Mike DiBiase. The adoptive father of professional wrestler "The Million Dollar Man" Ted DiBiase, he was married to Ted's mother Helen Hild (also a professional wrestler), and was the grandfather of Mike, Ted Jr., and Brett DiBiase.

== Amateur wrestling career ==
As an amateur wrestler, DiBiase, representing the US Navy, was the 1946 AAU champion in the UNL (open or heavyweight) division. He then wrestled at the University of Nebraska, and competed at NU in the NCAA tournament in 1947 and 1948, losing his first round match both years.

== Professional wrestling career ==
DiBiase made his professional debut in 1950. In 1963, DiBiase became the last opponent of light heavyweight boxer Archie Moore. One of DiBiase's most notable matches was a Texas Death Match against Dory Funk Sr, which according to Terry Funk lasted for four hours and 10 minutes, having taken in 32 falls.

== Death ==
DiBiase died in the ring on July 2, 1969, in Lubbock, Texas, following a match with Man Mountain Mike as the result of a fatal heart attack. Harley Race performed CPR on DiBiase and then rode in the ambulance with him. DiBiase was pronounced dead at the hospital. He was buried at the Sunset Cemetery in Willcox, Arizona. Ted DiBiase confirmed that his father had a huge cholesterol buildup and was genetically predisposed to heart disease.

== Championships and accomplishments ==
- American Wrestling Association
  - AWA Midwest Heavyweight Championship (3 times)
  - AWA Midwest Tag Team Championship (2 times) – with Bob Orton (1) and The Avenger (1)
- George Tragos/Lou Thesz Professional Wrestling Hall of Fame
  - Class of 2006
- Central States Wrestling
  - NWA Central States Heavyweight Championship (3 times)
- Championship Wrestling from Florida
  - NWA Brass Knuckles Championship (Florida version) (1 time)
  - NWA Southern Heavyweight Championship (Florida version) (1 time)
- Fred Kohler Enterprises
  - NWA World Tag Team Championship (Chicago Version) (1 time) – with Danny Plechas
- NWA Rocky Mountain
  - NWA Rocky Mountain Heavyweight Championship (1 time)
  - NWA Rocky Mountain Tag Team Championship (2 times) – with Freddie Blassie and Juan Garcia
- NWA Tri-State
  - NWA World Junior Heavyweight Championship (1 time)
- Pacific Northwest Wrestling
  - NWA Pacific Northwest Heavyweight Championship (1 time)
- Southwest Sports, Inc.
  - NWA Brass Knuckles Championship (Texas version) (1 time)
  - NWA Texas Tag Team Championship (2 times) – with Danny Plechas
- Western States Sports
  - NWA International Tag Team Championship (Amarillo version) (1 time) – with Danny Plechas
  - NWA North American Heavyweight Championship (Amarillo version) (3 times)
  - NWA North American Tag Team Championship (Amarillo version) (4 times) – with Danny Plechas (2), Dr. X (1), and Fritz Von Erich (1)
  - NWA Southwest Junior Heavyweight Championship (1 time)
  - NWA World Tag Team Championship (Amarillo version) (4 times) - with Art Nelson (1) and Danny Plechas (3)
  - NWA World Tag Team Championship (Amarillo version) Tournament (1957) - with Danny Plechas
- Worldwide Wrestling Associates
  - WWA Americas Heavyweight Championship (1 time)
  - WWA World Heavyweight Championship (1 time)
  - WWA World Tag Team Championship (3 times) – with Killer Karl Kox (1) and Karl Gotch (2)
  - Nebraska Pro Wrestling Hall of Fame inductee (2019)

== See also ==
- List of premature professional wrestling deaths
