= Mike DiBiase (wrestler, born 1977) =

American professional wrestler

Mike DiBiase II
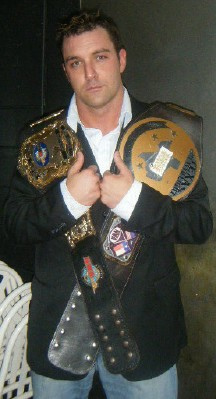
- DiBiase in 2008 with the NWA North American Heavyweight Championship and NWA Texas Heavyweight Championship

Personal information
- Born: Michael Wills Foreman DiBiase II; September 10, 1977 (age 49) Clinton, Mississippi, U.S.
- Family: Iron Mike DiBiase (grandfather); Helen Hild (grandmother); Ted DiBiase (father); Ted DiBiase Jr. (half-brother); Brett DiBiase (half-brother); Terry Funk (godfather)

Professional wrestling career
- Ring name: Mike DiBiase
- Billed height: 6 ft 2 in (1.88 m)
- Billed weight: 227 lb (103 kg)
- Trained by: Ted DiBiase; Terry Funk; Harley Race; Chris Youngblood
- Debut: July 8, 2006
- Retired: 2009

Michael Wills Foreman DiBiase II (born September 10, 1977) is an American retired professional wrestler. A third generation wrestler, DiBiase is the grandson of Iron Mike DiBiase and Helen Hild and the son of "The Million Dollar Man" Ted DiBiase.

== Professional wrestling career ==
DiBiase began his career in early 2006, when he and his younger half brother Ted began training in Amarillo, Texas with Chris Youngblood while gaining experience wrestling in shows for local independent wrestling promotion Professional Wrestling Federation (PWF). While there, DiBiase became the first-ever PWF West Texas Wrestling Legends Heritage Champion. He also won the 2006 Jay Youngblood Memorial Tag Team Tournament Cup alongside "Radical" Ricky Romero III. DiBiase and Romero became the first tag team in professional wrestling that consisted of two third generation superstars, and became known as Team 3G.

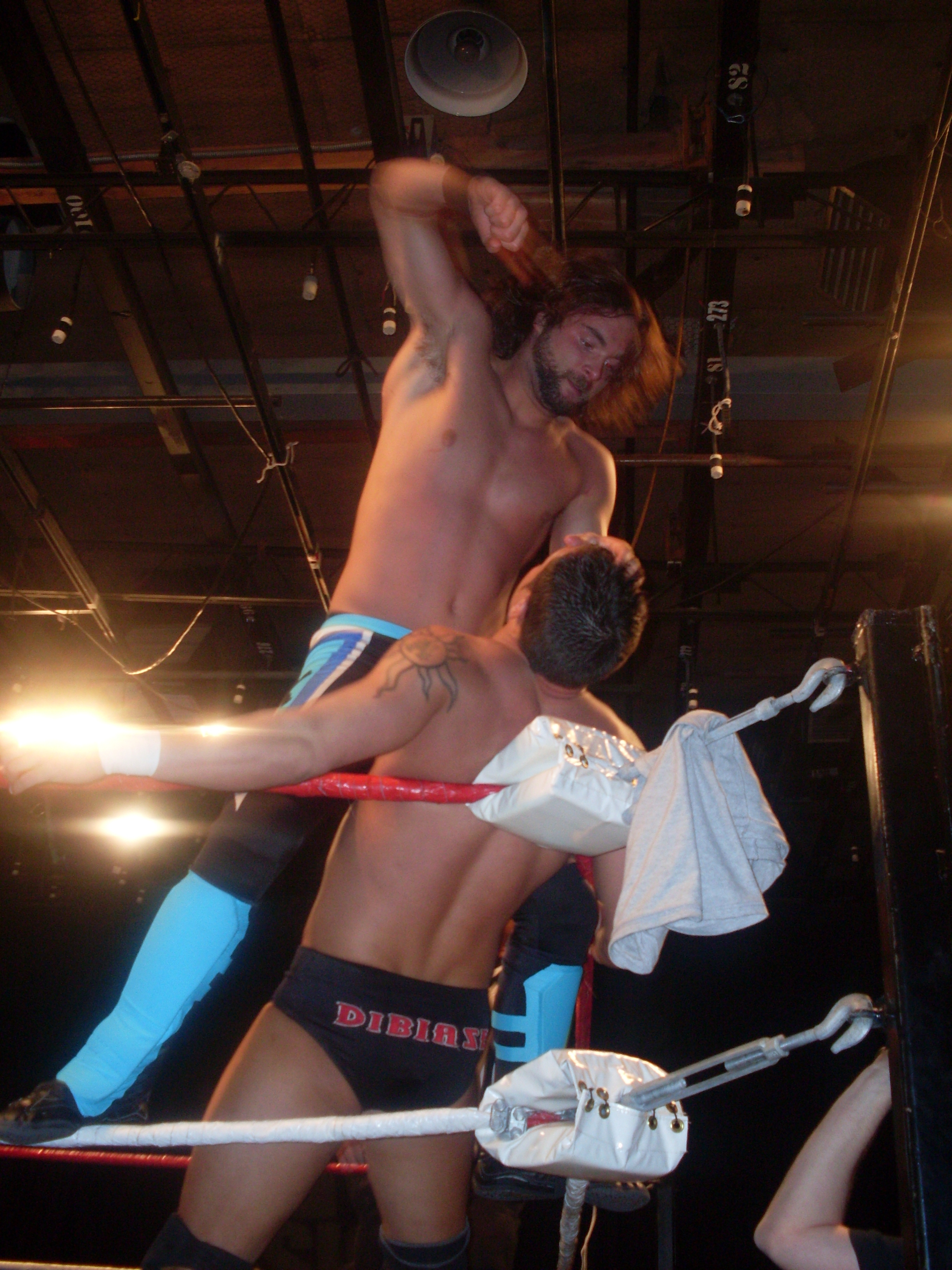
DiBiase (bottom) wrestling Johnny Goodtime in 2008

In mid-2006, the DiBiase brothers went to train with former NWA World Heavyweight Champion and WWE Hall of Famer Harley Race, and began competing in his World League Wrestling promotion. The DiBiase brothers began working as a tag team, and made their debut in April 2006, beating the then-WLW Tag Team Champions. DiBiase continued his stay in WLW and became one half of The WLW Tag Team Champions with "Wild" Wade Chism. On January 13, 2007, DiBiase returned to PWF for their Wrestlution event, where he defeated Mosh Pit Mike. Both DiBiase and his brother Ted signed contracts with Pro Wrestling Noah in late January, but suffered a knee injury. In February 2007, DiBiase suffered a torn ACL during a training session with Race. DiBiase had immediate surgery and was out of action for over five months. Due to his injury, he and "Wild" Wade Chism were stripped of the WLW Tag Team Titles.

During his injury, DiBiase relocated back to Amarillo, Texas and began scouting matches and offering advice to young wrestlers. He also made several in-ring appearances at the weekly events. On March 3, 2007, he vowed to win the PWF West Texas Wrestling Legends Heritage Championship, after he had returned. His next appearance was on April 28, 2007, when he awarded the 2007 Jay Youngblood Memorial Tag Team Tournament Cup to the team Pain Inc. (Mosh Pit Mike and WidowMaker). DiBiase's first match back after his injury was on July 7, 2007 when Team 3G reunited and became the PWF Tag Team Champions after defeating Pain Inc. and The Texas Heart Throbs (Brice Payne and Shawn Sanders) in a three-way tag team match. On December 8, 2007, DiBiase won the NWA North American Heavyweight Championship by defeating Damien Wayne in Las Vegas, Nevada.

DiBiase added the NWA Texas Heavyweight Championship to his collection on August 6, 2008, defeating Chaz Taylor in Amarillo, Texas. He was later stripped of the title, however, for missing a scheduled title defense on October 4. On May 1, 2009, DiBiase lost the NWA North American Championship to Apollo. He retired from professional wrestling later that year.

== Personal life ==
DiBiase is a third generation professional wrestler his grandfather, Iron Mike DiBiase, and his grandmother, Helen Hild are professional wrestlers. He was born in Amarillo, Texas, U.S. the first child of Ted DiBiase and Jaynet Foreman. His two half brothers Ted Jr. and Brett are professional wrestlers. Dibiase was baptized in a Catholic church. Terry Funk and Vicki Funk are DiBiase's godparents. Dibiase is Dana Foreman's nephew. His parents got divorced when he was two years old. John Robert Lewis (July 2, 1982) is his maternal-half-brother who died on February 7, 2025 due to brain cancer. His maternal grandparents are Jerry Foreman and Nancy Foreman. Dibiase's maternal grandfather Jerry Foreman was born on September 14, 1929 and died on August 28, 2018 at the age of eighty eight. He has a stepfather named Tommy Davis. DiBiase competed in amateur wrestling, college football, and soccer, before becoming a professional wrestler. He also worked as an account executive for MCI WorldCom.

=== Legal issues ===
On January 23, 2014, DiBiase was arrested following a 12-hour standoff with police in Amarillo, Texas. Initially sought by police for a parole violation, a SWAT team used tear gas to arrest DiBiase for both the parole violation and hindering apprehension.

== Championships and accomplishments ==
- Fusion Pro Wrestling
  - Fusion Pro Tag Team Championship (1 time) – with Ted DiBiase Jr.
- NWA Carolinas
  - NWA North American Heavyweight Championship (1 time)
- Professional Wrestling Federation
  - NWA Texas Heavyweight Championship (1 time)
  - PWF Championship (2 times)
  - PWF Tag Team Championship (1 time) – with Ricky Romero III
  - Jay Youngblood Memorial Tag Team Cup (2006) – with Ricky Romero III
- Pro Wrestling Illustrated
  - PWI ranked him #168 of the best 500 singles wrestlers in the PWI 500 in 2008
- World League Wrestling
  - WLW Tag Team Championship (1 time) – with "Wild" Wade Chism
