= WWF North American Heavyweight Championship =

Professional wrestling championship

- The North American Heavyweight Championship belt.

Details
- Promotion: World Wrestling Federation (WWF); New Japan Pro-Wrestling (NJPW)
- Date established: February 13, 1979
- Date retired: April 23, 1981

Other names
- WWWF North American Heavyweight Championship (1979); WWF North American Heavyweight Championship (1979–1981)
Statistics
- First champion: Ted DiBiase
- Final champion: Seiji Sakaguchi
- Most reigns: All titleholders (1)
- Longest reign: Seiji Sakaguchi (532 days)
- Shortest reign: Ted DiBiase (126 days)
- Oldest champion: Pat Patterson (38 years, 152 days)
- Youngest champion: Ted DiBiase (25 years, 26 days)
- Heaviest champion: Seiji Sakaguchi (287lb (130kg))
- Lightest champion: Pat Patterson (237lb (108kg))

The WWF North American Heavyweight Championship was a relatively short-lived title in the World Wrestling Federation (WWF, now WWE) from 1979 until 1981. It was established as the WWWF North American Heavyweight Championship on February 13, 1979, before the World Wide Wrestling Federation (WWWF) was renamed to WWF the following month. The inaugural champion was Ted DiBiase and the final champion was Seiji Sakaguchi.

Second champion Pat Patterson was recognized by the WWF as Intercontinental Heavyweight Championship after he reported on WWF television that he had won a (fictitious) one-night tournament in Rio de Janeiro to create a new overall title. Nonetheless, the North American title was later awarded to Seiji Sakaguchi after he defeated Patterson on a New Japan Pro-Wrestling house show.

In March 2018, the now WWE established a new North American championship for their NXT brand, the NXT North American Championship. This newer title, however, does not carry the lineage of the promotion's original North American championship.

== Reigns ==
Over the championship's two-year history, there were only three reigns among three champions. Ted DiBiase was the inaugural champion, with Seiji Sakaguchi being the last. Sakaguchi has the longest reign at 532 days, while DiBiase has the shortest at 126 days. Pat Patterson was the oldest champion at 38 years old, while DiBiase being the youngest at 25 years old.

=== Names ===
Name	Years
WWWF North American Heavyweight Championship	February 13, 1979 – March 30, 1979
WWF North American Heavyweight Championship	March 30, 1979 – June 13, 1980

Key
No.	Overall reign number
Reign	Reign number for the specific champion
Days	Number of days held

No.	Champion	Championship change			Reign statistics		Notes	Ref.
No.	Champion	Date	Event	Location	Reign	Days	Notes	Ref.
National Wrestling Alliance: World Wide Wrestling Federation (WWWF)
1	Ted DiBiase	February 13, 1979	Championship Wrestling tapings	Allentown, PA	1	126	Awarded the title when he signed with the World Wide Wrestling Federation (WWWF). The following month, the WWWF was renamed to World Wrestling Federation (WWF), and the title was renamed accordingly.	
National Wrestling Alliance: World Wrestling Federation (WWF)
2	Pat Patterson	June 19, 1979	Championship Wrestling tapings	Allentown, PA	1	158		
3	Seiji Sakaguchi	November 8, 1979	House show	Otaru, Japan	1	532	This was a New Japan Pro-Wrestling event.	
—	Deactivated	April 23, 1981	—	—	—	—	The WWF abandoned the title.	

== See also ==
- NXT North American Championship
- NXT Women's North American Championship
- NWA North American Heavyweight Championship

Sporting positions
Preceded by First	WWE's championship 1979–1981	Succeeded by WWE Intercontinental Championship
