= WWE Intercontinental Championship =

Men's professional wrestling championship

- The current WWE Intercontinental Championship belt with default side plates (2024–present)

Details
- Promotion: WWE
- Brand: Raw
- Date established: September 1, 1979
- Current champion: Ethan Page
- Date won: November 2, 2026

Other names
- WWF Intercontinental Heavyweight Championship (1979–1988); WWF Intercontinental Championship (1988–2002); WWE Intercontinental Championship (2002, 2003–present)
Statistics
- First champion: Pat Patterson
- Most reigns: Chris Jericho (9 reigns)
- Longest reign: Gunther (666 days)
- Shortest reign: Dean Douglas (15 minutes)
- Oldest champion: Ric Flair (56 years, 205 days)
- Youngest champion: Jeff Hardy (23 years, 222 days)
- Heaviest champion: Big Show (441 lb (200 kg))
- Lightest champion: Rey Mysterio (175 lb (79 kg))

The WWE Intercontinental Championship is a men's professional wrestling championship created and promoted by the American promotion WWE, defended on the Raw brand division. It is one of two secondary male championships for WWE's main roster, along with the WWE United States Championship on SmackDown. The current champion is Ethan Page, who is in his first reign. He won the title by defeating Chad Gable on the November 2, 2026, episode of Raw.

The championship was established by the then-World Wrestling Federation (WWF) on September 1, 1979, as a result of the WWF North American Heavyweight Championship being unified with an apocryphal South American Heavyweight Championship, with Pat Patterson as the inaugural champion. It is the third-oldest championship currently active in WWE, behind the WWE Championship (1963) and United States Championship (1974), but the second-longest tenured championship, as WWE has only owned the U.S. championship since 2001. Although generally contested in the midcard at WWE shows, it has been defended in the main event of pay-per-view events including WrestleMania VI, SummerSlam in 1992, the third and eighth In Your House shows, Backlash in 2001, and at Extreme Rules in 2018. It has been called a "stepping stone" to a WWE world championship.

In November 2001, the then-WCW United States Championship was unified into the Intercontinental Championship. In 2002, after the introduction of the first brand split, it became exclusive to Raw and the WWF was renamed WWE. Later that year, the European and Hardcore championships were unified into the Intercontinental Championship, which itself was unified into the World Heavyweight Championship (2002–2013 version). The next year, it was reactivated for Raw, followed by the United States Championship's reactivation as a counterpart championship on SmackDown. The Intercontinental Championship has switched between brands over the years, usually as a result of the WWE Draft; the 2023 draft moved the title back to Raw.

== Etymology ==
The term "intercontinental" in the title originally referred to North and South America. In 1985, the championship belt design changed, the centerplate now centered on the Atlantic Ocean, in a map including western Africa and Europe. On April 7, 1989, the championship was first defended outside of North America, by Rick Rude against Ultimate Warrior in Turin, Italy. On March 30, 1991, Mr. Perfect made the first Asian defense against The Texas Tornado at a WWF co-promotion with Super World of Sports in Tokyo, Japan. It first came to Africa on April 6, 1997, when champion Rocky Maivia pinned Savio Vega in Durban, South Africa. Shelton Benjamin made the first Australian defense on April 7, 2005, pinning Gene Snitsky in Brisbane.

== History ==
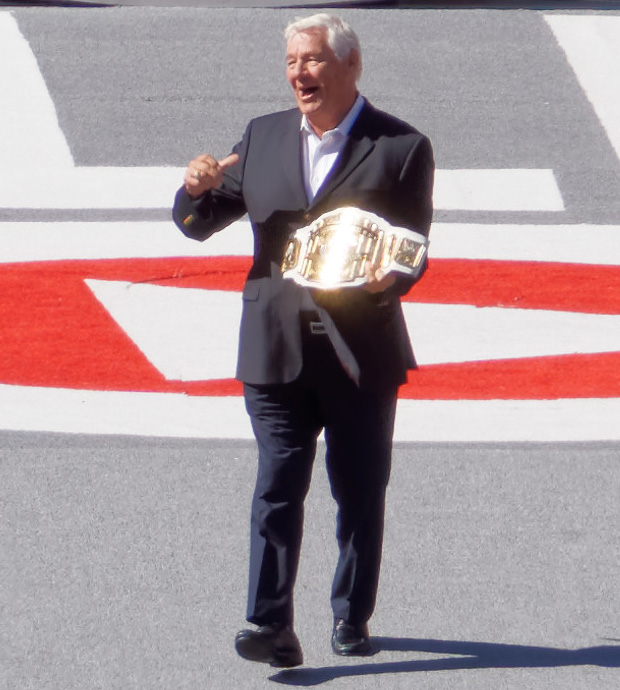
Pat Patterson, inaugural Intercontinental Champion, carrying the 2011–2019 design of the championship

WWF North American Heavyweight Champion Pat Patterson became the inaugural champion on September 1, 1979. It was said he had unified his title with the South American Heavyweight Championship, in a tournament in Rio de Janeiro, although both the tournament and South American Championship were entirely fictional.

On April 1, 1990, at WrestleMania VI, Intercontinental Champion Ultimate Warrior defeated WWF Champion Hulk Hogan to win the world title; so the Intercontinental Championship was vacated for the first time soon after. Mr. Perfect then won a tournament to crown a new Intercontinental Champion.

On October 17, 1999, Chyna became the only woman to hold the Intercontinental Championship by defeating Jeff Jarrett at No Mercy. Following the World Wrestling Federation's (WWF) purchase of World Championship Wrestling (WCW) in March 2001, the title was unified with the WCW United States Championship at Survivor Series, causing the United States Championship to become inactive. Then-United States Champion Edge defeated then-Intercontinental Champion Test.

In 2002, after the first brand split had begun and the WWF was renamed WWE, Raw general manager Eric Bischoff began unifying his brand's singles championships. On July 22, 2002, the Intercontinental Championship was unified with the European Championship in a ladder match, in which then-Intercontinental Champion Rob Van Dam defeated then-European Champion Jeff Hardy. On August 19, 2002, Bischoff made a six-minute gauntlet match for the Hardcore Championship, with the winner facing Van Dam in a second unification match the next week on Raw. Tommy Dreamer successfully retained his title in that match, and lost to Van Dam in a hardcore match the next week. As a result of the victories over Hardy and Dreamer, Van Dam is regarded as the last European and Hardcore champion in WWE history; these were his first and fourth reigns with those respective titles. On September 30, 2002, Bischoff scheduled a match to unify the Intercontinental Championship with the recently created Raw-exclusive World Heavyweight Championship. The unification match took place at No Mercy the following month and saw then-World Heavyweight Champion Triple H defeat then-Intercontinental Champion Kane, making him the Raw brand's sole male singles champion.

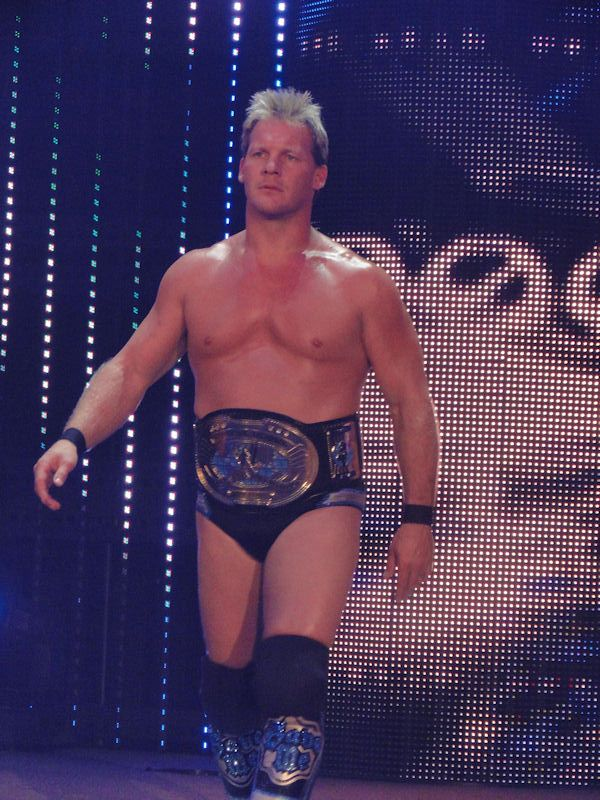
Record nine-time champion Chris Jericho in 2009

Over Bischoff's objections, Raw co-general manager Stone Cold Steve Austin reactivated the Intercontinental Championship on the May 5, 2003 episode of Raw and declared any former champion on the Raw roster eligible to enter a battle royal at Judgment Day for the title. Christian won the battle royal to win the championship and restore a secondary singles title for Raw wrestlers to compete for. Eventually, WWE did the same thing for SmackDown and created a separate set of titles for that brand; for its secondary title, SmackDown reactivated the United States Championship that had been unified with the Intercontinental Championship in 2001, placing the WWE name on it while claiming the lineage of the old WCW title of the same name (much as they did with the Cruiserweight Championship when that became WWE exclusive).

On May 31, 2015, the championship was contested in an Elimination Chamber match for the first time. In July 2016, WWE reintroduced the brand split. During the 2016 draft, then-Intercontinental Champion The Miz was drafted to SmackDown. Just days later, he successfully defended the title against Raw draftee Darren Young at Battleground, making the title exclusive to SmackDown. During the following year's Superstar Shake-up, Intercontinental Champion Dean Ambrose was moved to the Raw brand, making the title exclusive to Raw. Two years later during the 2019 WWE Superstar Shake-up, Intercontinental Champion Finn Bálor moved to SmackDown, making the title exclusive back to SmackDown. Later that year, the NXT brand, WWE's developmental territory, became WWE's third major brand when it was moved to the USA Network in September, thus making the NXT North American Championship a third secondary title in WWE. However, this recognition was reversed when NXT reverted to being WWE's developmental brand in September 2021. In late 2024, the WWE introduced the women's counterpart to the Intercontinental Championship.

== Belt design ==
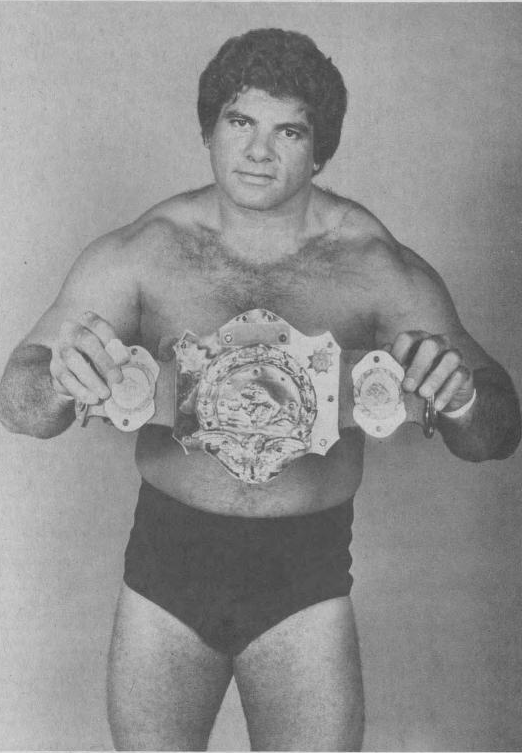
Don Muraco with the original 1979–1983 design of the WWF Intercontinental Heavyweight Championship

Razor Ramon with the 1985–1998 design of the championship, shown here with its black strap variant

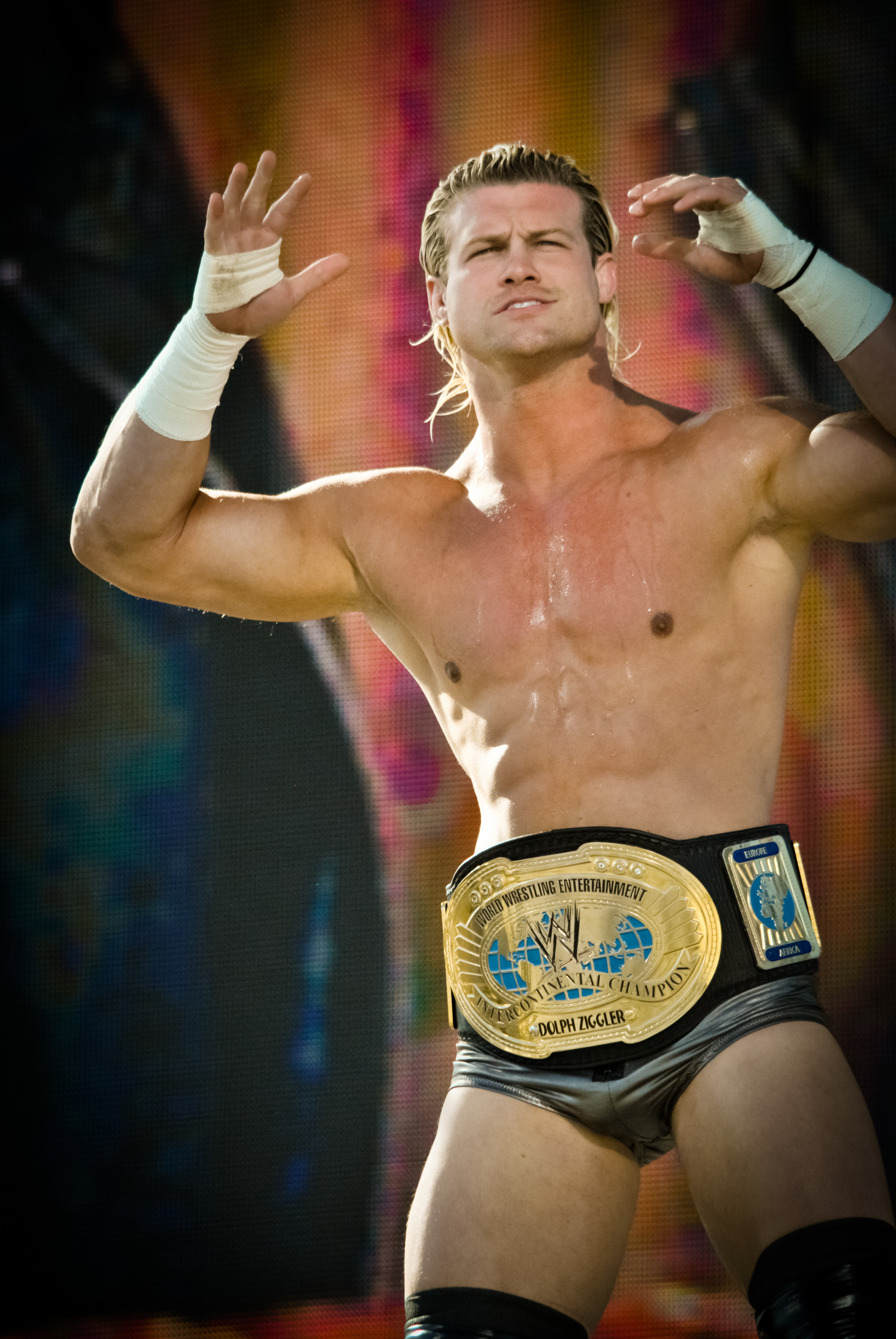
Dolph Ziggler with the 1998–2011 design of the championship

Wade Barrett with the 2011–2019 Intercontinental Championship design, a modern revival of the 1993–1995 version

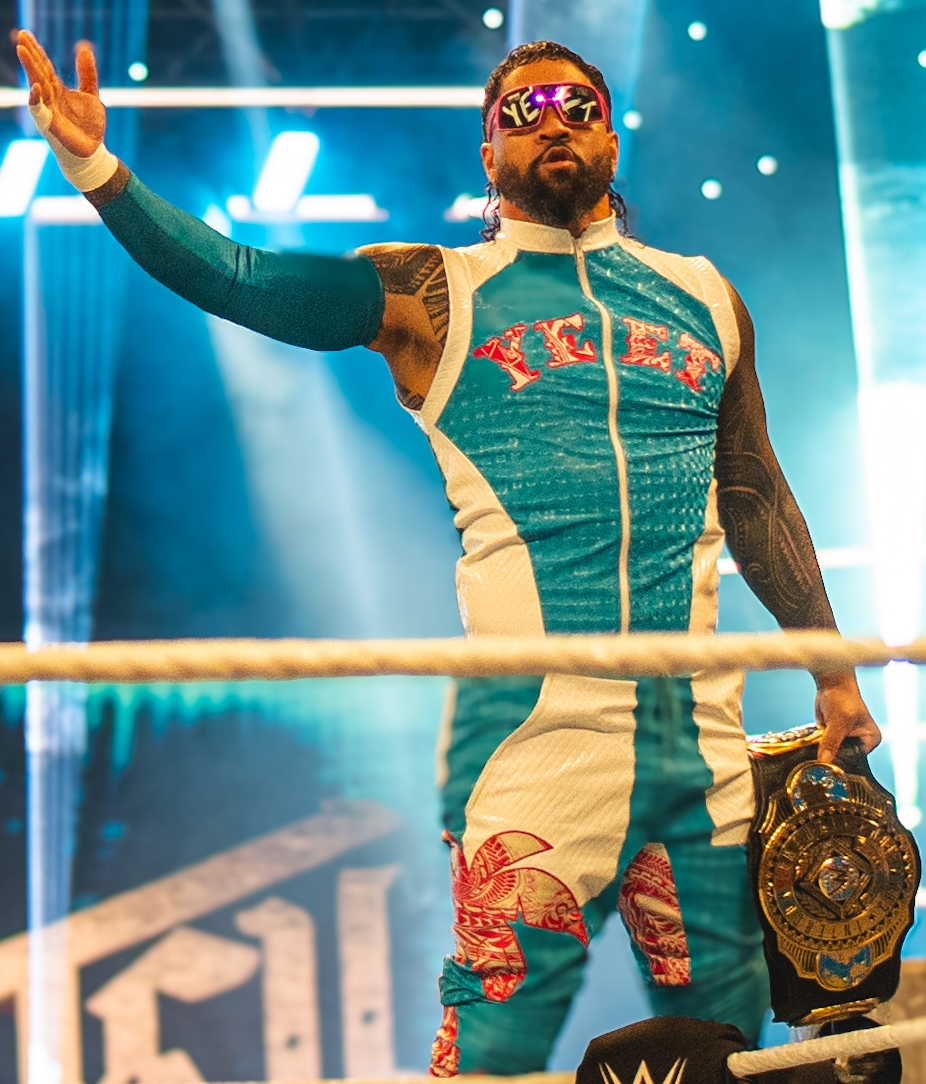
Jey Uso with the current WWE Intercontinental Championship design, introduced in 2019 and updated with blue accents in 2024

The 1985 version of the Intercontinental Championship belt, designed by Reggie Parks, consisted of a gold center plate featuring a blue globe, with the red WWF block logo on top which was later changed to gold. On the top ribbon of the belt it read "INTERCONTINENTAL" with the three stars on each side, while the bottom inscription read "HEAVYWEIGHT WRESTLING CHAMPION". The championship belt also had four identical side plates. Like the main WWF Championship, the strap could be changed to a custom color such as yellow worn by Ultimate Warrior and blue worn by Shawn Michaels.

In 1997, after Stone Cold Steve Austin won the title, the Intercontinental Championship was redesigned after he threw the previous belt into a river. The belt originally had a purple strap and the WWF block logo, but was later redesigned again with a black strap and the WWF scratch logo. The center plate was oval shaped and featured an oval shaped world map with the company's logo in the center. On the top it had six faux diamonds and the inscription initially read "World Wrestling Federation" while the bottom had two texts reading "INTERCONTINENTAL" on the ribbon and "CHAMPION" on the bottom. Each of the four side plates represented the continents: the first plate contained the WWF logo and the text Antarctica, the second plate read Europe and Africa, while the third plate represented the Americas (North America and South America) and the fourth plate read Asia and Australia. The belt's design was modified after the company's name change in 2002 from WWF to WWE, replacing the text with "World Wrestling Entertainment" accordingly. On October 2, 2011, at Hell in a Cell, Cody Rhodes reintroduced a modified version of Parks' 1985–1998 championship belt design with the white strap, with the modern WWE "scratch logo" and other embellishments. On August 18, 2014, the Intercontinental Championship belt, along with all other existing championship belts in WWE at the time, received a minor update, replacing the longstanding scratch logo with WWE's current logo that was originally used for the WWE Network that launched earlier that year in February.

On the November 22, 2019, episode of SmackDown, Sami Zayn presented a new belt design to champion Shinsuke Nakamura. The redesigned championship combined elements of the 1985-1998 and 1998-2011 versions of the title. Like the championship used during the Attitude and Ruthless Aggression eras, it returned to a black leather strap and featured an entirely new center plate with a regular shape. The center of the plate features an oval design. The top half of the oval says "Intercontinental" and the bottom half says "Champion"; the word "Heavyweight" sits in a banner on the inner side of the oval above the word "Champion". At the center of the oval is a diamond shape, representing a wrestling ring viewed from above, with the WWE logo over a globe. On the sides of the center, plate is two halves of the globe. The left side features the continents of North and South America as well as Africa and Europe, while the globe on the left shows Asia and Australia; both globes show a portion of Antarctica. The rest of the center plate is filled with ornamentation. Like all of WWE's other championships, the belt features two side plates with a removable center section that can be customized with the champion's logos; the default side plates consist of the WWE logo over a globe. On the September 30, 2024, episode of Raw, upon Jey Uso winning the championship from Bron Breakker the week prior, the championship received a minor update by adding blue on the globes on the centerplate.

== Brand designation history ==
Following the brand split on March 25, 2002, all titles in WWE became exclusive to either the Raw brand or SmackDown brand. The brand split was discontinued on August 29, 2011, and revived on July 19, 2016. The following is a list of dates indicating the transitions of the Intercontinental Championship between the Raw and SmackDown brands.

Date of transition	Brand	Notes
March 25, 2002	Raw	WWF Intercontinental Champion Rob Van Dam was drafted to Raw during the 2002 WWF Draft.; In May 2002, the WWF was renamed to WWE.; The European Championship was unified into the Intercontinental Championship on July 22.
July 30, 2002	SmackDown!	Intercontinental Champion Chris Benoit was moved to SmackDown!.
August 25, 2002	Raw	The Intercontinental Championship was returned to Raw after Rob Van Dam defeated Chris Benoit to win back the title.; The Hardcore Championship was unified into the Intercontinental Championship on August 26.
October 20, 2002	—N/a	At No Mercy, Triple H defeated Kane to unify the Intercontinental Championship into the World Heavyweight Championship. The Intercontinental Championship was subsequently deactivated.
May 5, 2003	Raw	Raw co-general manager Stone Cold Steve Austin reactivated the Intercontinental Championship.
April 13, 2009	SmackDown	Intercontinental Champion Rey Mysterio was drafted to SmackDown during the 2009 WWE Draft.
August 29, 2011	—N/a	End of first brand split.; The Intercontinental Champion could appear on both Raw and SmackDown.
July 19, 2016	SmackDown	Reintroduction of the brand split.; Intercontinental Champion The Miz was drafted to SmackDown in the 2016 WWE Draft.
April 10, 2017	Raw	Intercontinental Champion Dean Ambrose was moved to Raw in the 2017 WWE Superstar Shake-up.
April 16, 2019	SmackDown	Intercontinental Champion Finn Bálor was moved to SmackDown during the 2019 WWE Superstar Shake-up.
May 8, 2023	Raw	Intercontinental Champion Gunther was drafted to Raw during the 2023 WWE Draft.

== Championship tournaments ==
=== 1990 ===
This tournament was held to decide a new WWF Intercontinental Heavyweight Champion after previous champion Ultimate Warrior was required to vacate the title after he defeated Hulk Hogan for the WWF World Heavyweight Championship at WrestleMania VI.

Tournament bracket

Quarterfinals; Superstars; April 4–23, 1990 (Aired: April 28 – May 5–12); Wrestling Challenge; April 24, 1990 (Aired: May 13)
Tito Santana	Countout
Akeem	4:05
Brutus Beefcake	Countout (5:17)
Dino Bravo	Countout (5:17)
Mr. Perfect	Pinfall
Jimmy Snuka	3:44
Roddy Piper	Disqualification (5:25)
Rick Martel	Disqualification (5:25)

Semifinals
Tito Santana	Bye
N/A	—
Mr. Perfect	Bye
N/A	—

Final; Superstars; April 23, 1990 (Aired: May 19)
Tito Santana	7:30
Mr. Perfect	Pinfall

=== 1996 ===
This tournament was held to decide a new WWF Intercontinental Champion after previous champion Ahmed Johnson forfeited the title. He suffered (kayfabe) injuries to both kidneys when he was attacked by the debuting Faarooq after winning an 11-man battle royal.

Tournament bracket

Quarterfinals; Monday Night Raw; August 19, 1996 (Aired: August 9 – September 9); Raw Championship Friday; August 19, 1996 (Aired: September 6)
Owen Hart	Countout
The British Bulldog	8:55
Marc Mero	Disqualification
Stone Cold Steve Austin	8:39
Sycho Sid	Pinfall
Hunter Hearst Helmsley	3:39
Faarooq	Pinfall
Savio Vega	13:37

Semifinals; Monday Night Raw; August 19, 1996 (Aired: September 16)
Owen Hart	9:26
Marc Mero	Pinfall
Sycho Sid	7:15
Faarooq	Disqualification

Final; Monday Night Raw; September 23, 1996
Marc Mero	Pinfall
Faarooq	14:50

=== 1997 ===
This tournament was held to determine the new WWF Intercontinental Champion after former champion Stone Cold Steve Austin forfeited the belt after his neck injury.

Tournament bracket

Quarterfinals; Raw Is War; September 8–22, 1997 (Aired: September 15)
Brian Pillman	Disqualification
Dude Love	4:47
Owen Hart	Disqualification
Goldust	2:09
Faarooq	2:42
Ken Shamrock	Pinfall (Note: Ken Shamrock initially won the match, but he suffered an injury so Faarooq advanced.)
Ahmed Johnson	Pinfall
Rocky Maivia	4:56

Semifinals; Raw Is War; September 22–23, 1997 (Aired: September 29)
Brian Pillman	7:12
Owen Hart	Disqualification
Faarooq	Disqualification
Ahmed Johnson	2:29

Final; Badd Blood: In Your House; October 5, 1997
Owen Hart	Pinfall
Faarooq	7:12

=== 1998 ===
This tournament was held to decide a new WWF Intercontinental Champion after previous champion Triple H vacated the title due to injury.

Tournament bracket

First Round; Raw Is War; October 12, 1998
Ken Shamrock	Submission
Steve Blackman	2:30
Val Venis	Pinfall
Marc Mero	2:15
X-Pac	Pinfall
Jeff Jarrett	3:09
Mankind	Submission
Mark Henry	3:18

Semifinals; Raw Is War; October 12, 1998
Ken Shamrock	Submission
Val Venis	4:36
X-Pac	Pinfall
Mankind	3:16

Final; Raw Is War; October 12, 1998
Ken Shamrock	Submission
X-Pac	3:56

=== 2010 ===
This tournament was held to crown a new Intercontinental Champion. On May 7, 2010, after failed attempts of getting Intercontinental Champion Drew McIntyre to stop attacking Matt Hardy, SmackDown General Manager Theodore Long fired McIntyre and vacated the title. The following week, Kofi Kingston won a tournament to become the new champion, but Mr. McMahon reverted Long's decision. Due to the decision by Mr. McMahon, the vacancy of the title and Kingston's championship win are not recognized as WWE continued to recognize McIntyre as champion during that period. At Over the Limit, Kingston defeated McIntyre to win his second official Intercontinental Championship.

Tournament bracket

Semifinals; SmackDown; May 4, 2010 (Aired: May 7)
Kofi Kingston	Pinfall
Dolph Ziggler	11:15
Christian	Pinfall
Cody Rhodes	12:15

Final; SmackDown; May 11, 2010 (Aired: May 14)
Kofi Kingston	Pinfall
Christian	8:43

=== 2020 ===
On May 12, 2020, the Intercontinental Championship was declared vacant after champion Sami Zayn elected to refrain from competing during the COVID-19 pandemic. A tournament to crown a new champion was then set to begin on the May 15 episode of SmackDown.

Tournament bracket

1st Round; SmackDown; May 15–22, 2020
Daniel Bryan	Submission
Drew Gulak	12:47
Jeff Hardy	Pinfall
Sheamus	14:05
Elias	Pinfall
King Corbin	16:07
AJ Styles	Pinfall
Shinsuke Nakamura	13:15

Semifinals; SmackDown; May 29, 2020
Daniel Bryan	Pinfall
Sheamus (Note: Jeff Hardy was unable to compete in the semifinals after he was implicated in a hit-and-run incident involving Elias and subsequently arrested. As a result, Daniel Bryan chose to have a new opponent for the semifinals. Sheamus won a battle royal earlier in the night to advance to the semifinal match against Bryan.)	11:59
N/A (Note: Elias was unable to compete in the semifinals because he got (kayfabe) injured in a car crash. AJ Styles opted for the semifinals bye.)	—
AJ Styles	Bye

Final; SmackDown; June 8, 2020 (Aired: June 12)
Daniel Bryan	38:10
AJ Styles	Pinfall

== Reigns ==
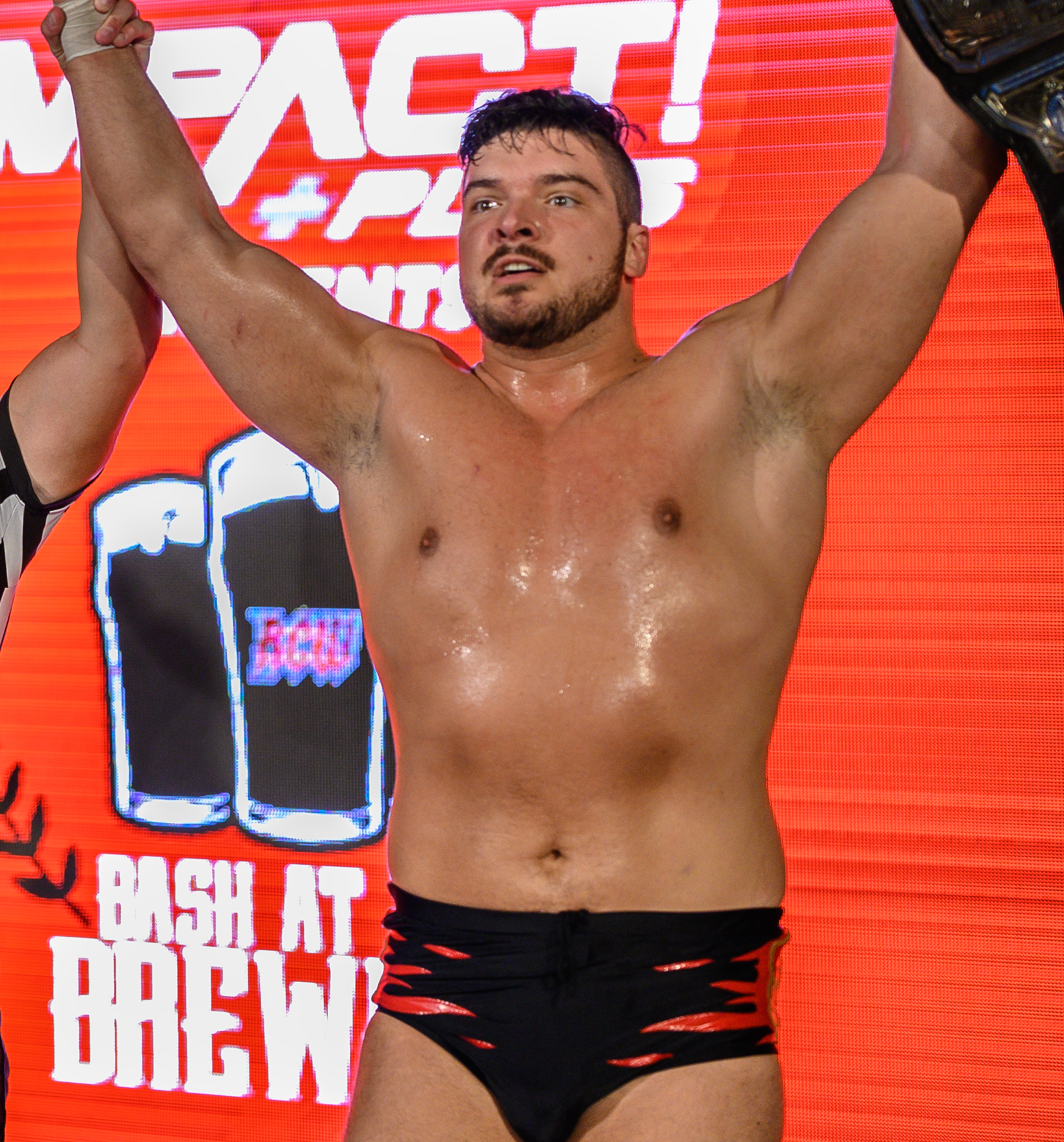
Current champion Ethan Page

The inaugural champion was Pat Patterson who, as the WWF North American Heavyweight Champion in September 1979 was also declared "South American Heavyweight Champion" after allegedly winning a tournament in Rio de Janeiro. Patterson unified the two championships into the Intercontinental Championship. Since then, there have been 193 reigns among 96 different champions. Chris Jericho has the most reigns with nine. At 666 days, Gunther's reign is the longest in the title's history, both as a singular reign and for most cumulative days as champion. Prior to his reign, Pedro Morales had the longest combined reign at 619 days over two reigns, and held this record for over 41 years. Triple H's fifth reign is the shortest as the title would be temporarily retired at the time immediately upon Triple H winning and unifying the title with the original World Heavyweight Championship. Chyna is the only woman to win the title. The youngest champion was Jeff Hardy, who won the championship for the first time at the age of 23, while the oldest champion was Ric Flair, who won the championship at the age of 56. There have been 10 vacancies throughout the title's history. Only five men have held the title for a continuous reign of one year (365 days) or more: Pedro Morales, Don Muraco, Randy Savage, The Honky Tonk Man, and Gunther.

Ethan Page is the current champion in his first reign. He won the title by defeating Chad Gable on the November 2, 2026, episode of Raw in Brooklyn, New York.

== Reception ==
The Intercontinental Championship's early years have been praised. Samuel Kendall of Comic Book Resources lauded the championship during this era, stating: "It was a foregone conclusion that the Intercontinental Champion was the workhorse of the company and the next in line for the World Heavyweight Championship." Steve Cook of 411Mania wrote that "nearly anybody that was a big deal in WWE held the championship at some point." Steve Austin said he considered the Intercontinental Championship to be as important as the world titles and he remains in possession of the physical belt that represented the championship during his reign because of its historical importance.

Throughout the 2010s, WWE was criticized for its booking of the Intercontinental Champions, with champions either not defending during long periods of time or losing in many of their non-title matches. Chris Jericho said that WWE promoter Vince McMahon told him that "nobody fucking cares about the Intercontinental Championship" after he asked to be placed in a match for the title at WrestleMania 29 in 2013. Also in 2013, Darren Gutteridge of Pro Wrestling Dot Net wrote that the "title has proven an albatross for the past decade, with almost all title holders doomed to tread water, usually only beating people decisively when the title is on the line." The albatross metaphor was also used to describe the title in 2014 by James Caldwell of Pro Wrestling Torch, while Dave Meltzer of the Wrestling Observer said that year that "the [Intercontinental] title isn't booked to mean much." Various commentators in 2014 and 2015, including from The Baltimore Sun, Rolling Stone, PWInsider, and Pro Wrestling Dot Net cited the fact that the Intercontinental Champion often loses non-title matches, while Mike Tedesco of Wrestleview questioned how Intercontinental Champions losing too much is supposed to bring prestige to the title.

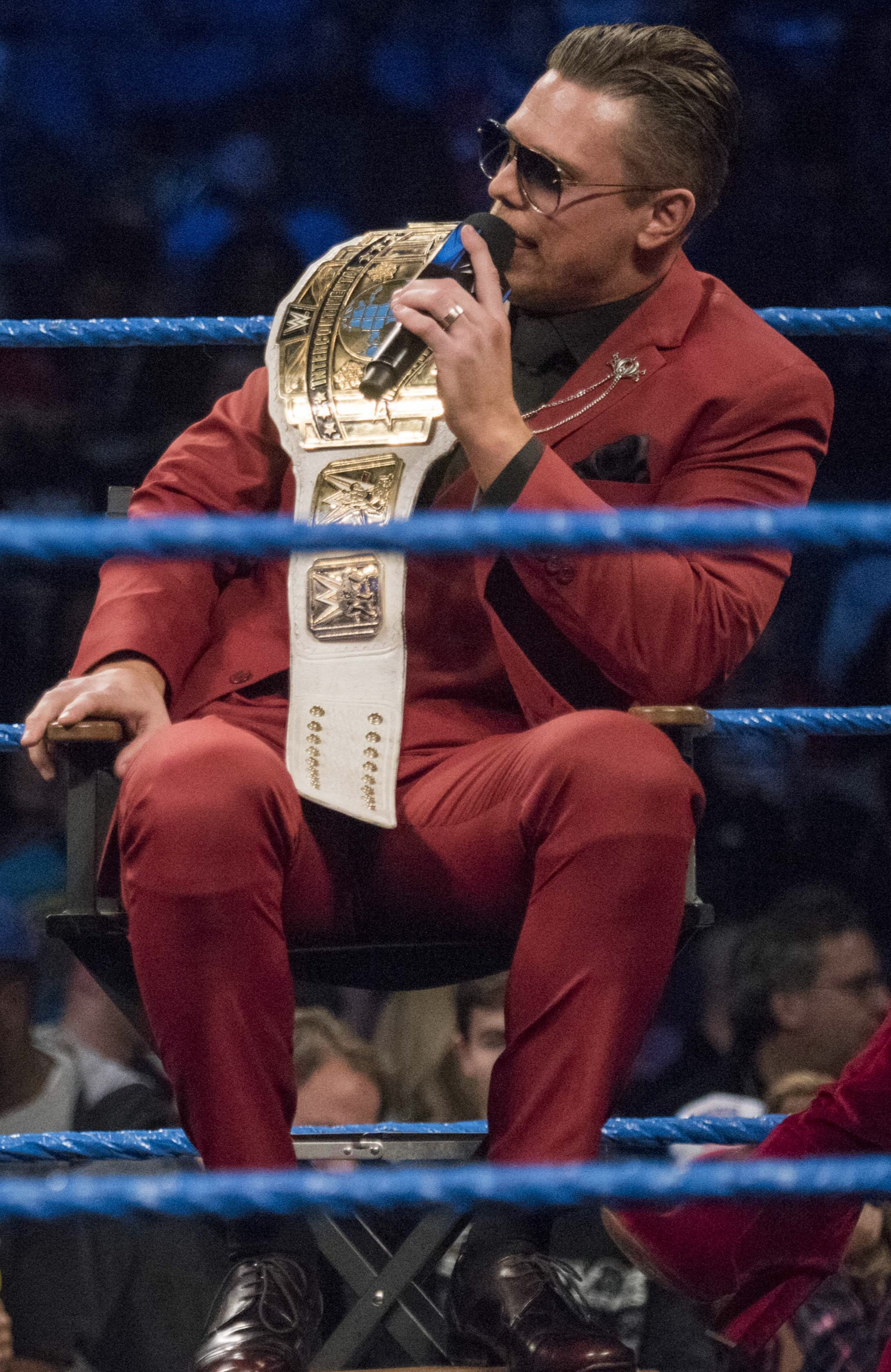
Eight-time champion The Miz

Some observers argued that The Miz managed to elevate the championship during his multiple runs with the title; The Sportster columnist Wesly Avendano argued that Miz "made the Intercontinental Championship "Must See" again" and "helped stabilize the IC Title during a time when WWE really needed him to", while Lucean from Cageside Seats observed that Miz "has been, at least for me, making the Intercontinental (IC) title appear really meaningful" and that "the number of people I see wanting to see someone to beat the Miz and take the title to get that heat makes becoming the IC champion seem meaningful." The championship continued to receive criticism into the early 2020s. Kendall panned the recent reigns as forgettable and wrote that the title had "turned into a prop to be lugged around, rather than a title that should bestow prestige." Cook wrote that it had been "treated as something of an afterthought" for the previous two decades. The championship was only defended on two pay-per-views in 2021 and was not defended at any within the first quarter of 2022, including WrestleMania 38; its absence on the premiere event was widely criticized by fans.

Sporting positions
Preceded by WWF North American Heavyweight Championship	WWE's secondary championship 1979–present	Succeeded by Current
