= Ted DiBiase =

American professional wrestler (born 1954)

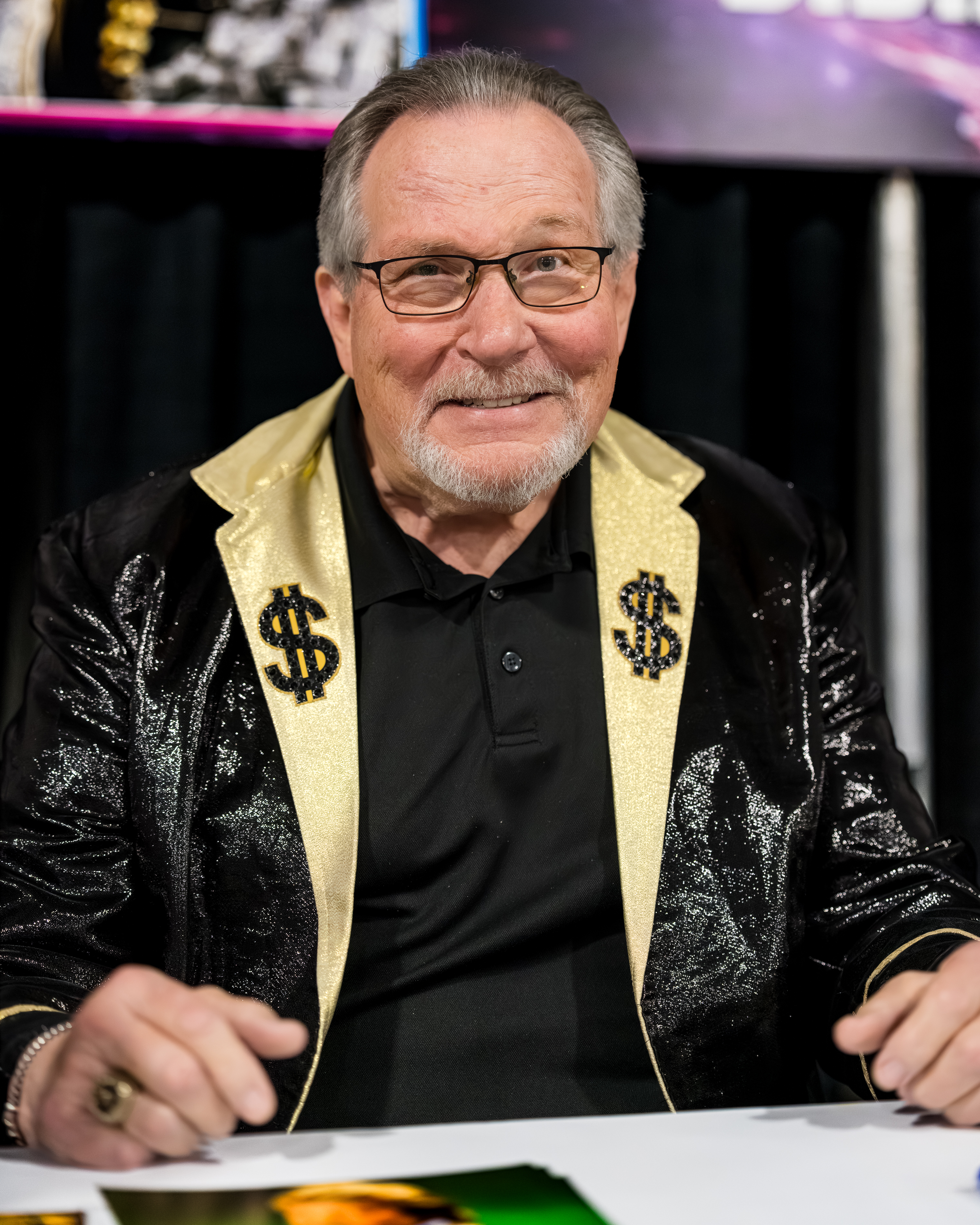
- DiBiase in 2026

Personal information
- Born: Theodore Marvin Willis; January 18, 1954 (age 72) Omaha, Nebraska, U.S.
- Spouse: Melanie DiBiase (m. 1981)
- Children: Mike DiBiase II; Ted DiBiase Jr. Brett DiBiase
- Family: Iron Mike DiBiase (father) (adoptive); Helen Hild (mother)
- Website: milliondollarman.com

Professional wrestling career
- Ring name(s): Ted DiBiase; The Million Dollar Man
- Billed height: 6 ft 1 in (185 cm)
- Billed weight: 260 lb (118 kg)
- Billed from: Omaha, Nebraska Seasonal residences (WWE)
- Trained by: Dory Funk Jr. Terry Funk
- Debut: 1974
- Retired: 1993

Theodore Marvin DiBiase Sr. (/diːbiˈʌsi/; born January 18, 1954) is an American retired professional wrestler, manager, and color commentator. He is signed to WWE as of 2024, where he works in their Legends program. DiBiase achieved championship success in a number of wrestling promotions, holding thirty titles during his professional wrestling career. He is best recalled by mainstream audiences for his time in the World Wrestling Federation (WWF), where he wrestled as "the Million Dollar Man" Ted DiBiase. He has been named as one of the best technical wrestlers, and greatest villains in pro wrestling history.

Among other accolades in the WWF/E, DiBiase was the first WWF North American Heavyweight Champion, a three-time WWF Tag Team Champion (with Irwin R. Schyster), a one-time WWE 24/7 Champion, and winner of the 1988 King of the Ring tournament. DiBiase purchased the WWF World Heavyweight Championship from André the Giant. DiBiase also awarded himself the Million Dollar Championship, which was held by various associated wrestlers including DiBiase's onscreen proteges, Stone Cold Steve Austin and LA Knight. DiBiase headlined multiple WWF cards, including WrestleMania IV and the first-ever SummerSlam in 1988. DiBiase is a member of several professional wrestling halls of fame: he was inducted into the Wrestling Observer Newsletter Hall of Fame upon its inception in 1996, and headlined the 2010 WWE Hall of Fame ceremony.

He also had a major run in Mid-South Wrestling, where he on numerous occasions won the Mid-South North American Heavyweight Championship and Mid-South Tag Team Championship.

== Early life ==
Theodore Marvin Willis was born in Omaha, Nebraska. He is the biological son of Ted Willis, an entertainer and singer; and Gladys Helen Nevins, a wrestler. He is the adopted son of wrestler "Iron" Mike DiBiase, who married his mother when he was four years old. His adoptive father Mike died of a heart attack in the ring when DiBiase was 15. Seven-time NWA World champion Harley Race rushed to the ring and performed CPR, but was unable to save Iron Mike's life. Afterward, his mother suffered from depression and alcoholism, so DiBiase was moved to Willcox, Arizona, to live with his grandparents. He attended Creighton Preparatory high school in Omaha, Nebraska and attended West Texas State University on a football scholarship. While there he became a member of the Alpha Tau Omega fraternity. However, due to an injury in his senior year, he later dropped out of college to begin a career in professional wrestling.

== Professional wrestling career ==
=== Mid-South Wrestling (1974–1979) ===
Ted DiBiase was trained by Dory Funk Jr. and Terry Funk. He made his professional wrestling debut as a referee in June 1974 in the Amarillo territory owned by the Funks. He then went to the Mid-South territory of Bill Watts being promoted as the son of Iron Mike in 1975 where he wrestled for four years. His first match was a loss against Danny Hodge. By February 1978, DiBiase would unseat Dick Slater to become Missouri State champion only to lose to Dick Murdoch after a few weeks on television.

=== World Wide Wrestling Federation / World Wrestling Federation (1979) ===
In the beginning of 1979, DiBiase came to Vincent J. McMahon's World Wide Wrestling Federation / World Wrestling Federation, where he had a run as a babyface. On February 13, 1979, the WWWF North American Heavyweight Championship was created, and Ted DiBiase would be awarded the WWWF North American Heavyweight Championship, becoming the first champion.

In March 1979, the WWWF was renamed the World Wrestling Federation (WWF). The newly established championship would be renamed the WWF North American Heavyweight Championship shortly after the company's name change. On June 19, 1979, DiBiase lost the North American Championship to Pat Patterson.

He was Hulk Hogan's opponent in Hogan's first Madison Square Garden match.

=== National Wrestling Alliance and return to MSW / Universal Wrestling Federation (1980–1987) ===
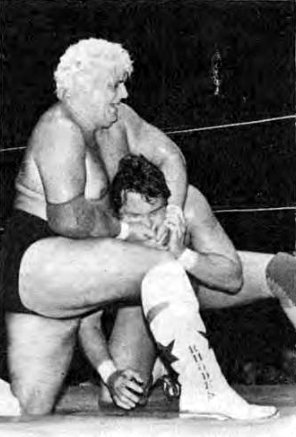
DiBiase during a 1981 match against Dusty Rhodes

DiBiase also spent time in the Georgia area where he had an early face run. One legendary angle had DiBiase enduring four piledrivers (one on the concrete floor and three in the ring) administered in the WTBS studio arena by The Fabulous Freebirds before his tag team partner, Tommy "Wildfire" Rich, threw in the towel (the angle of DiBiase being badly injured was so real the TBS studio audience could be seen crying). Rich and DiBiase later feuded, leading to a loser leaves town match which DiBiase won, but instead of Rich leaving the area, he donned a mask calling himself "Mister R." The feud culminated in a match between Mister R and DiBiase, Rich appeared from backstage and distracted DiBiase. Mister R then rolled up DiBiase to get the win and unmasked as Brad Armstrong. Both DiBiase and Rich left the territory shortly thereafter.

In the early to mid-1980s, DiBiase participated in angles in various territories feuding with the likes of Ric Flair best known from this point in his Mid South return with the likes of Bob Roop, Paul Orndorff, Dick Murdoch, The Fabulous Freebirds and One Man Gang. DiBiase turned heel against the Junkyard Dog and formed a group called The Rat Pack with Jim Duggan and Matt Borne, ran Mid-south for months. He would notably win matches by hitting his opponents with a "loaded" black glove when the referee was distracted. Aligning with Skandor Akbar, Dibiase caused a rift within the group, namely Duggan. The two would feud until DiBiase lost a loser leaves town match. He also held various championships and made frequent trips to All Japan Pro Wrestling until his eventual departure from Mid-South Wrestling (which by this point was now the UWF). Typically, his matches ended with the use of a "loaded" black glove, which he pulled from his tights to "knock out" his opponent when the referee was not looking.

While locked in talks with the National Wrestling Alliance in 1987 after the UWF was acquired by Jim Crockett, DiBiase received an offer from the WWF. DiBiase was eventually convinced by WWF to sign despite the fact that he would not be told his gimmick until after he agreed, under the promise that it was something that would receive a serious push. WWF official Pat Patterson informed DiBiase that if owner Vince McMahon were to go out to wrestle, it would be the gimmick that he would give himself.

=== All Japan Pro Wrestling (1983–1987) ===
DiBiase entered All Japan Pro Wrestling (AJPW) in 1983. He won the NWA United National Championship on October 14, 1983, in a tournament defeating Jerry Lawler by forfeit. Three months later, on January 28, 1984, DiBiase lost the title to Michael Hayes. DiBiase's mother Helen Hild died two months later on March 4, 1984.

In August 1985, DiBiase formed a tag team with fellow gaijin Stan Hansen, and the two became the PWF Tag Team Champions when Hansen chose DiBiase to replace Bruiser Brody, who left for New Japan Pro-Wrestling (NJPW). Later that year, DiBiase and Hansen entered the 1985 World's Strongest Tag Determination League and would emerge victorious, finishing in first place with 7 points.

On July 3, 1987, DiBiase and Hansen would lose the PWF Tag Team Championship to Jumbo Tsuruta and Tiger Mask, ending their two-year reign as champions. Eight days later, on July 11, DiBiase and Hansen regained the title for a second time, but would be stripped of the title shortly after due to DiBiase leaving AJPW for the WWF.

=== World Wrestling Federation (1987–1993) ===
==== WWF Championship pursuits (1987–1989) ====
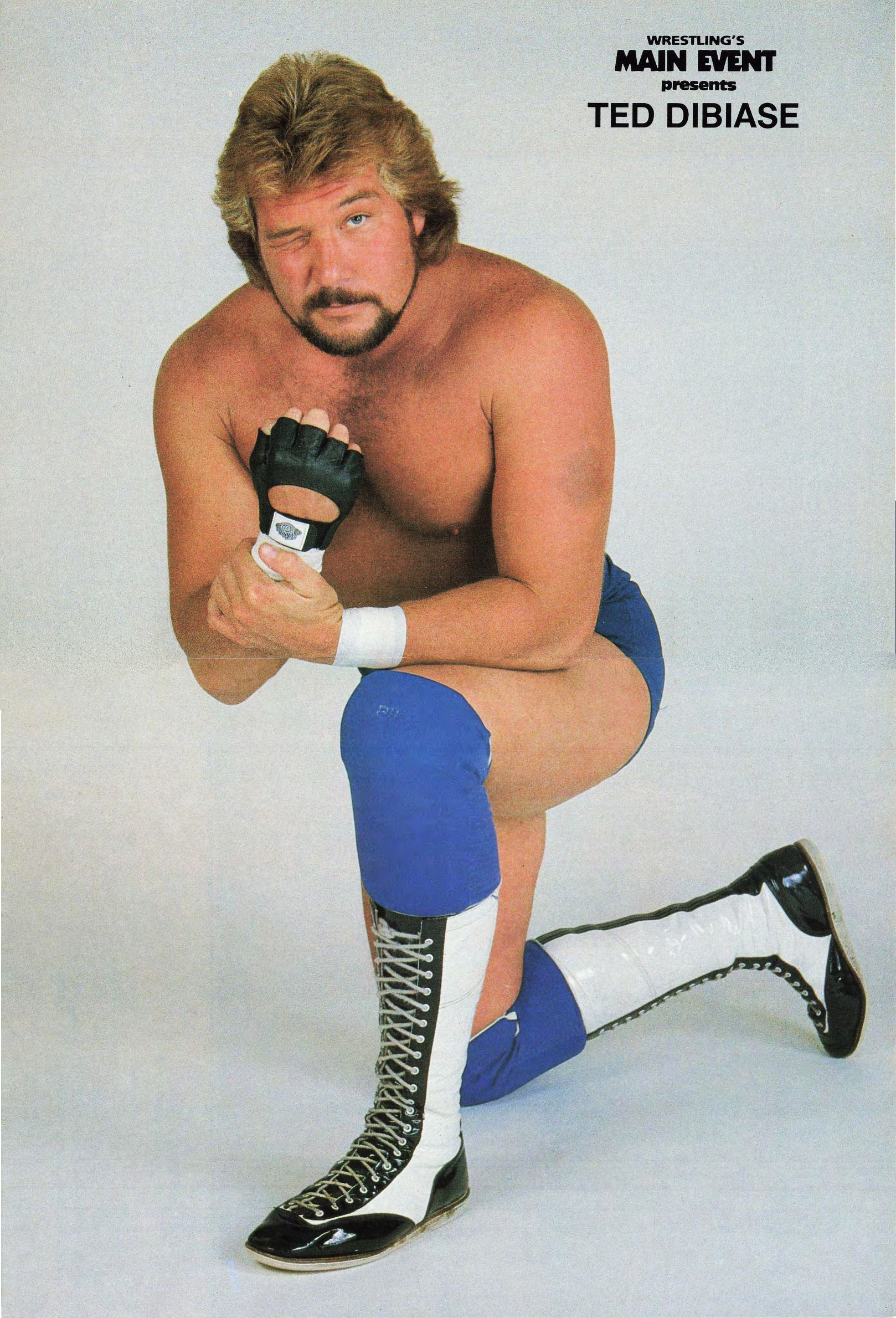
DiBiase, circa 1987

DiBiase made his return to the WWF as a babyface on May 15, 1987, at a house show in Houston, Texas. He came out to the ring to announce to those in attendance that it was only fitting that he was now competing in the WWF. Moments later The One Man Gang and Slick came to the ring for Gang's scheduled match. The referee had to force DiBiase to leave before there was a confrontation. At the next house show on June 7, DiBiase would have his first match and lose to The One Man Gang. He went on to lose two additional house show confrontations to The Gang. DiBiase would tag-team with Sam Houston on June 26 against The One Man Gang and Ron Bass (Houston had run in to assist DiBiase against The Gang at one of the earlier house show matches); towards the end of the match, DiBiase (kayfabe) turned on and attacked Houston after Houston missed a dropkick on Bass, leaving him to get double-teamed and pinned. His actions during the match served to effectively turn DiBiase heel, right before the onscreen debut of his new gimmick.

On a June 27 episode of WWF Superstars, DiBiase had his first vignette. He would now be known as "The Million Dollar Man", a millionaire who wore a gold-studded, dollar-sign-covered suit and, in time, a custom-made, diamond-encrusted and self-awarded "Million Dollar Championship" belt. The Million Dollar Man character was based on the type of wrestler who Vince McMahon would want to be. He was billed as having a spring residence in Palm Beach, Florida, a summer residence in Hyannis Port, Massachusetts, an autumn residence in Bel Air, California, and a winter residence in the Netherlands Antilles.

DiBiase had a bodyguard by the name of Virgil, who was by his side during his matches and vignettes. The idea for the name Virgil was based on then-NWA/WCW booker Dusty Rhodes, whose real name was Virgil Runnels, though booker and producer Bruce Prichard disputes this. The name of DiBiase's finishing move, the Million Dollar Dream (a Cobra Clutch), was also supposedly meant to be a rib (inside joke) towards Dusty Rhodes, who was nicknamed "The American Dream". Virgil was often seen performing humiliating tasks, such as rubbing DiBiase's feet. DiBiase claimed "Everybody has a price" demonstrating his "power" through a series of vignettes in which he did things such as bribe the manager of a local swimming pool to close for the day so he could have the pool to himself, or when the honeymoon suite in a hotel was already booked, he bribed the desk clerk to have the couple already in there thrown out. Other skits featured DiBiase traveling in limousines, giving $100 tips to waiters, and using $100 bills in convenience stores for small purchases like chewing gum. In reality, DiBiase's road travel was deliberately booked for first-class airplane flights and five-star hotel accommodations, and he was given a stipend of petty cash from the WWF Offices so that he could "throw money around" in public (i.e. pick up tabs and "overtip", buy drinks for entire bars, actually pay for small items with a $100 bill, etc.) in order to make the character seem more real. Other times, DiBiase invited fans (including a young Rob Van Dam and a then-unknown Linda McMahon) to perform humiliating acts (such as kissing his feet) for money. During one skit, he invited a young boy onto a stage and told him if he bounced a ball 15 times in succession, DiBiase would pay him $500. After the 14th bounce, DiBiase kicked the ball away, sending the boy home without pay; however, according to his autobiography, everybody who was not paid on-camera was paid off-camera. He frequently stuffed a $100 bill into the mouth of a wrestler on whom he had used the Million Dollar Dream move. Virgil, however, would more often than not surreptitiously retrieve the discarded bill from the wrestler's mouth.

His first big in-ring angle came in late 1987 on an episode of Superstars of Wrestling, where he announced his plan to buy the WWF World Heavyweight Championship from Hulk Hogan, as Hogan refused and said that DiBiase would have to defeat him in the ring for the championship belt. Hogan got the upper hand in a series of matches, and a frustrated DiBiase approached André the Giant to win the title for him, which did happen on the February 5, 1988, edition of The Main Event I (which aired live on NBC), where André defeated Hogan under questionable circumstances for the WWF World Heavyweight Championship. This was the match of the infamous "who is the true Dave Hebner" debacle. Whom the crowd and viewers at home thought was the "real" Dave Hebner (it was actually his real-life twin brother Earl, whom many now mistake as being the original Hebner) counted the match finishing pin for André despite the fact that Hogan's shoulder was up at the count of one. Afterwards the real Dave Hebner came running into the ring to dispute the ruling his "evil twin" had made awarding the WWF world championship to Andre the Giant; André then announced he was surrendering the championship belt and handed it to DiBiase. In the following days, DiBiase was, in fact, billed as the WWF World Heavyweight Champion in three house shows, defending the title one time against Bam Bam Bigelow.

However, WWF President Jack Tunney declared DiBiase was not the champion, as he did not win the title by pin or submission, and said that because Andre had surrendered the title, it was therefore vacant. André's world title win was still recognized, though it is still considered the shortest world title reign in WWF history. This angle was an amplification of an angle in the old Georgia Championship Wrestling (GCW), when Larry Zbyszko paid Killer Tim Brooks $25,000 for his NWA National Heavyweight Championship in 1983.

A tournament was announced to crown a new WWF World Heavyweight Champion at WrestleMania IV, where DiBiase defeated Hacksaw Jim Duggan in the first round and Don Muraco in the quarterfinal before receiving a bye in the semi-finals to advance to the finals of the tournament. The reason for the bye was a double-elimination of Hulk Hogan and André the Giant when they both were disqualified in their match, with DiBiase meant to face the winner. In a backstage interview afterwards, André revealed that DiBiase paid him to make sure Hogan did not advance in the tournament. DiBiase was defeated by "Macho Man" Randy Savage in the finals, helped by Hulk Hogan negating André's repeated interference in the match. DiBiase continued to feud with Savage over the WWF World Heavyweight Championship throughout the summer of 1988, even headlining in a tag team match pitting DiBiase and André the Giant vs. Hogan and Savage at the inaugural SummerSlam (in a match billed as "Where The Mega Powers Meet The Mega Bucks"). Although pro-heel commentator Jesse "The Body" Ventura served as the guest referee, Hogan pinned DiBiase to win the match. DiBiase then defeated Brutus Beefcake, Ken Patera, Ron Bass, and Randy Savage to win the 1988 King of the Ring tournament, receiving his first WWF success.

Bobby Heenan sold Hercules's contract to Ted DiBiase for his services as his personal slave. DiBiase claimed that Hercules was his slave, but started feuding with him after Hercules turned face. He eliminated Hercules from the main event at Survivor Series.

At the Royal Rumble in 1989, DiBiase purchased the #30 entrance spot from Akeem to become the final entrant in the match. Big John Studd and DiBiase were the final two participants in the match. DiBiase offered Studd a bribe to eliminate himself, but Studd eliminated him to win the match. DiBiase continued to feud with Hercules; the two had a series of matches including a match that DiBiase won on the February 3 The Main Event II.

==== Million Dollar Champion (1989–1991) ====
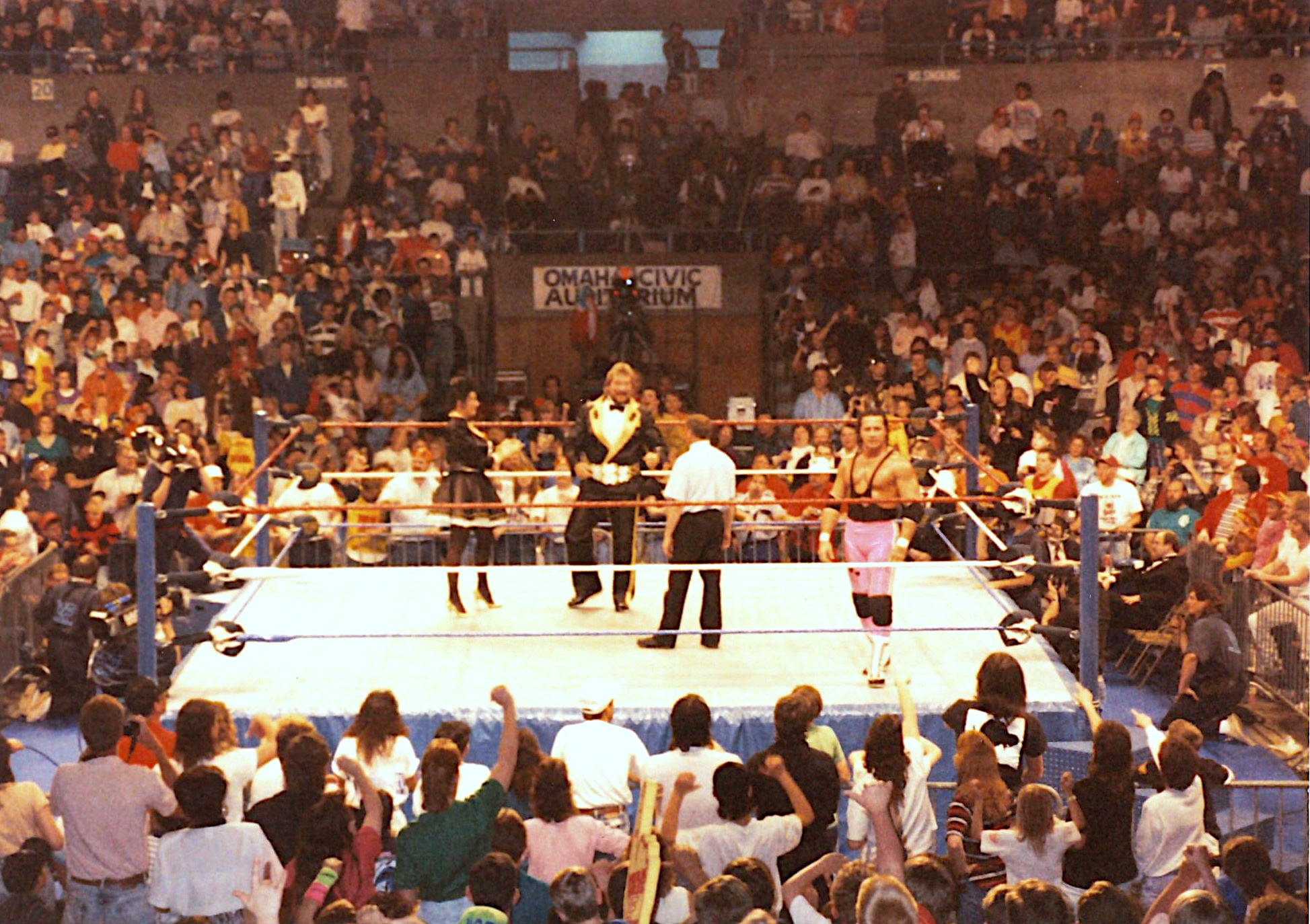
After failing to win the WWF Championship, DiBiase created his own title, the Million Dollar Championship.

DiBiase defeated the Blue Blazer on the March 11 Saturday Night's Main Event XX. After that match, he introduced the Million Dollar Championship, his own championship belt which was not recognized by the WWF. He created this belt because he was unable to buy or win the WWF World Heavyweight Championship from Hulk Hogan and Randy Savage.

DiBiase fought Brutus Beefcake to a double-count-out at WrestleMania V. DiBiase's next big feud was with Jake "The Snake" Roberts. A few weeks after WrestleMania, DiBiase attacked Roberts on WWF Superstars of Wrestling after Roberts defeated Virgil in a match. DiBiase put Roberts out of action for several months with a neck injury. (The storyline was created so Roberts could get surgery on his back from the guitar attack from The Honky Tonk Man a year earlier.) While Roberts recuperated, DiBiase defeated Jimmy "The Superfly" Snuka at SummerSlam by count-out. On the October 14 Saturday Night's Main Event XXIII, DiBiase faced Hulk Hogan in a match for the WWF Championship where DiBiase had the monster Zeus by his side. DiBiase lost the match when he accidentally hit Zeus and was pinned by Hogan with a small package. At Survivor Series, DiBiase captained a team dubbed the "Million Dollar Team" consisting of himself, The Powers of Pain (The Warlord and The Barbarian), and Zeus against Hogan's "Hulkamaniacs" consisting of Hogan, Jake Roberts, and Demolition (Ax and Smash). DiBiase eliminated Roberts after pinning him with help from Virgil before being pinned himself by Hogan.

In 1990, he was punished for buying #30 in the previous year's Royal Rumble. For his punishment, he was forced to enter as entrant #1. He broke the record at the time by lasting 45 minutes in the Royal Rumble match after entering as the #1 entrant. He eliminated two opponents before he was eliminated by Ultimate Warrior. This may have foreshadowed Dibiase seeking revenge on Warrior after Warrior became WWF Champion, by facing him several months later at a co-promotional All Japan and New Japan event in the Tokyo Dome. He then continued his feud with Jake Roberts, who stole the Million Dollar Belt, leading to a match at WrestleMania VI where Roberts was counted out. Shortly after WrestleMania, he had a brief feud with Big Bossman which dated back to when DiBiase tried to bribe Bossman into retrieving the Million Dollar Belt. Bossman refused DiBiase's bribe and returned the Million Dollar Belt to Roberts. At SummerSlam, DiBiase bought the services of Sapphire, who was the manager of Dusty Rhodes at the time. This led to Rhodes and DiBiase feuding throughout the end of 1990 into the beginning of 1991. On the October 13 Saturday Night's Main Event XXVIII, he attacked Dusty's son Dustin Rhodes during Dusty's match with Randy Savage. DiBiase and Dusty captained rival teams at Survivor Series, with DiBiase's mystery partner turning out to be the debuting Undertaker. DiBiase wound up eliminating both members of The Hart Foundation and was the sole survivor of the match. He, however, was eliminated in the main event by Hogan. DiBiase said about Undertaker's debut "nobody knew him, at the time if you know how this works they were using my celebrity and me introducing The Undertaker was helping him get over. He wasn't 'The Phenom' then he was just a new kid on the card, this new character The Undertaker and of course he grew in to be one of the greatest attractions the WWE has ever had. At the time it wasn't a big deal to me, I was just doing my job." DiBiase then received a shot at the WWF Champion, Ultimate Warrior, on a special Thanksgiving episode of Saturday Night's Main Event, which ended when DiBiase was disqualified after Virgil attacked Warrior, which was seemingly an interlude to Randy Savage further assaulting Warrior. During this time DiBiase started to develop a real-life disdain for Warrior and would later become very vocal about it both in behind the scenes interviews and in his autobiography.

At the Royal Rumble, Ted DiBiase and Virgil defeated Dusty and Dustin Rhodes in a tag team match. After the match, DiBiase ordered Virgil to put the Million Dollar Championship belt around his waist. Virgil instead hit DiBiase with the belt, turning face. At WrestleMania VII, DiBiase lost by count-out to Virgil, who had help from 'Rowdy' Roddy Piper. Sensational Sherri, who earlier in the night had turned on a losing Randy Savage, came down midway through the match to help DiBiase and became his full-time valet. On the April 27 Saturday Night's Main Event XXIX, DiBiase fought Bret Hart to a double count-out.

DiBiase lost the Million Dollar Championship to Virgil at SummerSlam in August 1991 when Virgil smashed his head into an exposed turnbuckle and pinned him to get the victory. DiBiase participated in the 1991 King of the Ring tournament drawing with Ricky Steamboat in the first round. DiBiase and Steamboat would battle to a time-limit draw with neither man advancing in the tournament. DiBiase regained the Million Dollar Championship from Virgil with help from Repo Man on the November 11 edition of Prime Time Wrestling which was dubbed Survivor Series Showdown. At Survivor Series, he was one of the contestants eliminated from his match. At This Tuesday in Texas, DiBiase and Repo Man defeated Virgil and Tito Santana.

At the Royal Rumble In January 1992, DiBiase entered second, being eliminated by British Bulldog. Following the Royal Rumble, DiBiase quietly dropped Sherri as his valet (so she could manage Shawn Michaels)

==== Money Inc. (1992–1993) ====
DiBiase had occasionally teamed with Irwin R. Schyster ("IRS") since mid-1991, and in February 1992 they officially formed the tag team Money Inc.. The duo, mostly managed by Jimmy Hart, won the WWF Tag Team Championship three times between February 1992 and June 1993. Their first reign came on February 7, 1992, when they defeated the Legion of Doom for the titles. Money Incorporated then feuded with the Natural Disasters. They defended the title against the Natural Disasters at WrestleMania VIII and lost the match by count-out, thus retaining the title. On July 20, they lost the title to the Natural Disasters.

After losing a match to the Legion of Doom at SummerSlam, DiBiase and IRS regained the belts on the October 13 edition of WWF Wrestling Challenge from the Natural Disasters. This title change led to a feud with The Nasty Boys, who were originally scheduled for the title shot. On the November 14 Saturday Night's Main Event XXXI, they defended their titles against the Ultimate Maniacs (Ultimate Warrior and Randy Savage). DiBiase and IRS lost the match by count-out and thus retained the titles once more.

DiBiase participated in the Royal Rumble match, entering at #4 before eventually being eliminated by The Undertaker. Shortly after, DiBiase and IRS became involved in a major angle with the returning Brutus Beefcake. DiBiase faced Beefcake on one of the first episodes of Monday Night Raw. DiBiase and IRS attacked Beefcake after the match and slammed his face (which had been surgically repaired following a wind sailing accident) with a briefcase. Money Inc. also attacked their manager Jimmy Hart, who was disgusted by their actions. Beefcake's best friend Hulk Hogan came to Beefcake's defense and challenged Money Inc. to a tag team title match at WrestleMania IX. DiBiase and IRS retained their titles by disqualification after Hogan used Beefcake's protective face mask as a weapon.

Money Inc. dominated the tag team division of the WWF. They feuded with the Steiner Brothers and had a series of title exchanges. DiBiase and IRS were defeated by the Steiners for the WWF Tag Team Championship on June 14 in a non-televised match at a Wrestling Challenge taping. They would regain the titles on June 16 at a live event but lost them back to the Steiners three days later on June 19 at another live event, their feud culminated in a tag team steel cage match for the WWF Tag Team Championship at SummerSlam Spectacular. DiBiase last wrestled for the WWF in August, bowing out following an angle which saw Razor Ramon turn face and 1-2-3 Kid debut. The Kid had scored an upset pinfall against a cocky Ramon, causing DiBiase to mock Ramon and tell him he would show him how it was done. He then went on to also lose to the Kid, giving Razor a newfound respect for the Kid thus turning Razor face. This included a match at SummerSlam between DiBiase and Ramon which DiBiase lost. This was DiBiase's last television appearance in the WWF during this run. He revealed in a shoot interview that his decision to leave the WWF at this point was motivated by a desire to resolve his marital problems.

=== All Japan Pro Wrestling (1993) ===
After leaving the WWF, DiBiase returned to Japan for a final tour with All Japan Pro Wrestling (AJPW). In his debut match, he teamed with Stan Hansen to defeat Holy Demon Army for the World Tag Team Championship in Tokyo's Nippon Budokan. DiBiase and Hansen went on to face opponents such as Holy Demon Army, Super Generation Army, and the Can-Am Express.

DiBiase worked a couple of matches on the United States independent circuit in October 1993 when he defeated Tito Santana by count out at the "Funk Free For All" in Amarillo, Texas. and defeated Terry Funk by count out at NWA Bensalem Bash in Bensalem, Pennsylvania. This would be his last singles match of his career.

In November 1993, the World Tag Team Championship was vacated to be contested in the World's Strongest Tag Determination League. DiBiase and Hansen entered the League, defeating Richard Slinger and Tracy Smothers in their first match. Subsequently, DiBiase sustained an injury to two cervical discs in his neck and withdrew from the League, with Giant Baba taking his place as Hansen's partner. DiBiase wrestled one further match on November 15 when he and Hansen defeated Abdullah the Butcher and Giant Kimala. Subsequently, DiBiase quietly announced his retirement from the ring; he did not wrestle again for over 14 years.

=== World Wrestling Federation (1994–1996) ===
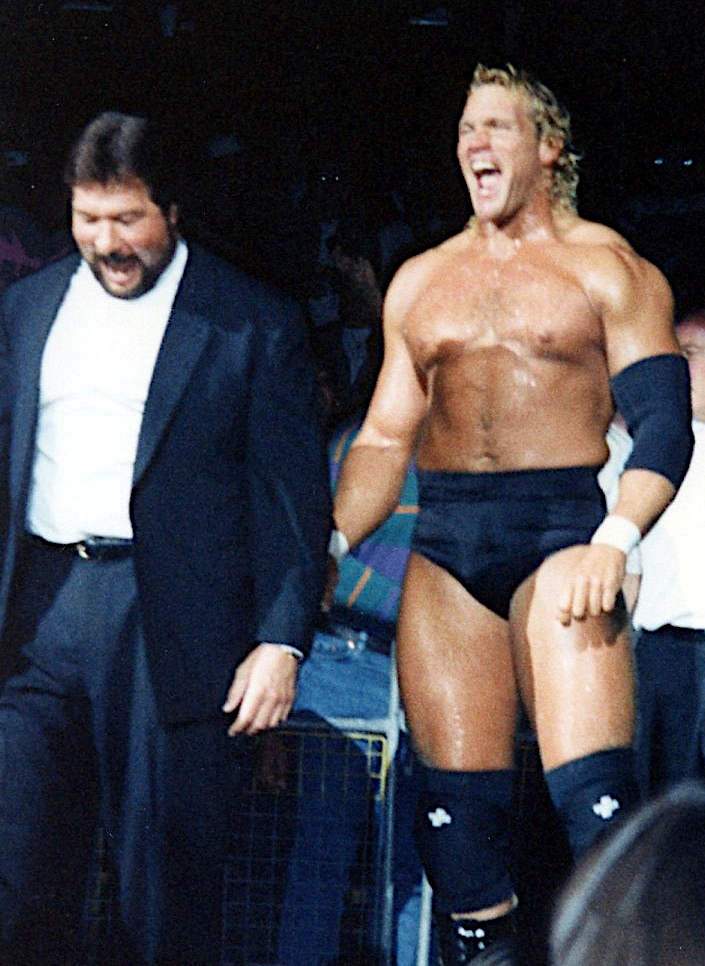
DiBiase managed many wrestlers in his Million Dollar Corporation stable, including Sycho Sid.

DiBiase returned to the WWF at the 1994 Royal Rumble as a guest commentator. DiBiase then began working as a commentator and manager for the WWF. Later in 1994, DiBiase purchased the contracts of many wrestlers for his Million Dollar Corporation stable, which over time included I.R.S., Bam Bam Bigelow, Nikolai Volkoff, Kama, King Kong Bundy, Sycho Sid, 1-2-3 Kid, and in a swerve, Tatanka. DiBiase also renewed his connection with the Undertaker after the latter's six-month hiatus after the January Royal Rumble. Saying that he had originally brought the Undertaker to the WWF, and he was going to bring him back, DiBiase debuted a new Undertaker under his control. This Undertaker, however, proved to be an impostor played by Brian Lee, and was subsequently defeated by the real Undertaker at SummerSlam.

DiBiase also had a place in the main event of WrestleMania XI as the manager of Bam Bam Bigelow in his match versus Lawrence Taylor. Surrounding the ring were members of DiBiase's corporation to offset Taylor's entourage of NFL All-Pros on the opposite side. After Taylor defeated Bigelow, DiBiase publicly referred to Bigelow as an embarrassment. This culminated in Bigelow quitting The corporation after DiBiase fired him following a loss to Diesel in a WWF Championship match. Bigelow aligned himself with Diesel in a feud versus members of DiBiase's corporation.

As a manager, DiBiase also later introduced "The Ringmaster", who eventually became Stone Cold Steve Austin, to the WWF in January 1996. Austin became the Million Dollar Champion and began wearing DiBiase's gold belt that was introduced in 1989. DiBiase's last appearance with the company was at In Your House: Beware of Dog 2 in 1996, where he was kayfabe forced to leave the WWF after Steve Austin lost to Savio Vega. In reality, he left for rival promotion World Championship Wrestling (WCW). DiBiase said in shoot interviews that the reason he left the company was because Vince McMahon wanted managers to start going on the road to take part at house shows (DiBiase and Jim Cornette were only managing at house shows at Madison Square Garden, Meadowlands Arena and Nassau Coliseum).

=== World Championship Wrestling (1996–1999) ===
DiBiase debuted in WCW on August 26, 1996, revealing himself as the fourth member of the New World Order, joining Scott Hall, Kevin Nash and Hollywood Hogan. DiBiase claimed to be financing the group (seemingly playing on his "Million Dollar Man" WWF persona). He was jokingly referred to by the members of the group as "Trillionaire Ted", satirizing "Billionaire Ted", which was itself a disparaging nickname WWF had given to WCW owner Ted Turner. DiBiase was the spokesperson for the nWo for 3 months until Eric Bischoff joined the nWo and replaced him in that role.

DiBiase quit the nWo shortly after Spring Stampede. A few months later, on the August 4, 1997, episode of Nitro, he made a face turn and began managing The Steiner Brothers, leading them to two World Tag Team Championships. DiBiase managed The Steiners until Scott Steiner turned heel via betraying Rick Steiner at SuperBrawl VIII on February 22 and joined the nWo (DiBiase still remained in Rick's corner thru April 1998). DiBiase also managed one-time WWF rival Ray Traylor for a while until he stopped managing altogether.

In 2013, DiBiase said about his time in WCW: "Eric Bischoff doesn't know that much about wrestling", "Eric took credit for the nWo, but that wasn't his idea, the nWo had already been done in Japan, so they had copied something that had already been done. It was a good idea, but originally I was supposed to be the mouthpiece of the nWo and reality is I think Eric saw how it was getting over and he saw how he could put himself in the role that he had hired me for. As each week went by pretty soon Eric isn't the announcer anymore, he becomes part of the nWo and I just went to him one day and told him I'm not just going to walk out there and be Hulk Hogan's Virgil, you hired me to be the spokesperson for this, so if that's not what I'm going to do you can send me home. The reason I said that was because they had to pay me one way or the other because I had a contract where they had to pay me for three years".

=== Second return to WWE (2004–2008, 2009–present) ===
==== Backstage roles (2004–2008) ====
"I said, 'you know, that's not really me'. I'm not Clint Eastwood. I'm not good on both sides of the camera. I'm good in front of it. And they wanted me to come back and at least try, so I did for about a year and a half and I guess it took them that long to figure out I was right".

— DiBiase about his job as creative in WWE

In late 2004, WWE offered DiBiase a job as creative. He accepted the job and worked as part of the creative team a year and a half. In April 2005, DiBiase was hired as a creative consultant and road agent for the SmackDown! brand of World Wrestling Entertainment. On October 3, 2005, at WWE Homecoming, DiBiase appeared with other WWE legends in a ceremony. He eventually led the attack on Rob Conway, who had come down to the ring to insult the legends.

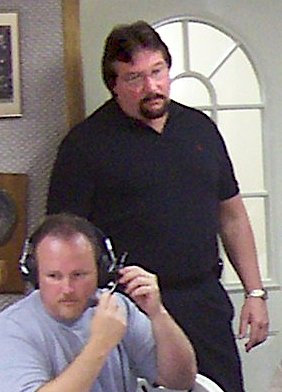
DiBiase at a radio program on July 15, 2006, at the International Wrestling Institute and Museum

DiBiase inducted his former manager Sensational Sherri into the WWE Hall of Fame on April 1, 2006, and made an appearance at WrestleMania 22, offering Eugene $1,000 to dribble a basketball 100 times backstage and kicked the ball away at the last second. DiBiase also appeared on the April 17 episode of Raw behind a newspaper doing his famous evil laugh as the camera went off air. DiBiase made an appearance at an IPW show in Newton, Iowa, on July 14, 2006, where he watched his sons' tag team match. The following day, he accepted the George Tragos/Lou Thesz Professional Wrestling Hall of Fame induction for his father, Mike, at the International Wrestling Institute and Museum. He also appeared at the Raw Family Reunion on October 9, 2006, aiding Ric Flair in his match with the Spirit Squad. On October 26, 2006, Ted DiBiase was released from his WWE contract.

DiBiase made his first in ring appearance in over five years at the Raw 15th Anniversary Special on December 10, 2007, by winning a 15-man battle royal, in which he was not even an active participant. Irwin R. Schyster, DiBiase's former tag team partner of Money Incorporated, had won the battle royal. DiBiase came down to ringside and offered Schyster a bribe to eliminate himself. Schyster accepted and hopped over the top rope, making DiBiase the victor. DiBiase then declared that even after fifteen years, everyone still had a price for the "Million Dollar Man."

On the May 19, 2008, edition of Raw, he was seen alongside Mr. McMahon about to "discuss business", in William Regal's office. On the following Raw, DiBiase introduced his son Ted DiBiase Jr. to WWE as its newest member.

==== WWE Hall of Fame and sporadic appearances (2009–present) ====
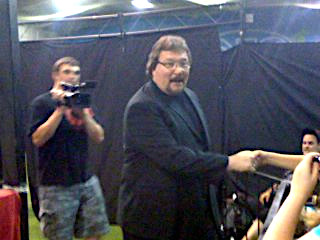
DiBiase making an appearance at a local indy show on August 20, 2011

On the June 29 episode of Raw, Ted DiBiase Jr. announced in a segment with Cody Rhodes and Randy Orton that DiBiase would appear on Raw the following week as the special guest host, and DiBiase appeared as scheduled on July 6. On the show, DiBiase booked his son to face Randy Orton. After DiBiase Jr. lost the match, he accused his father of setting him up and trying to steal his time, even slapping his father across the face. DiBiase would later come out at the end of the show and sanctioned a triple threat match for Randy Orton's WWE Championship at Night of Champions including John Cena and Triple H in his final act as the guest host. He is also a playable character in WWE Legends of WrestleMania and an unlockable superstar in WWE SmackDown vs. Raw 2010 and WWE 2K14. DiBiase was announced as the first inductee of the WWE Hall of Fame Class of 2010 on the February 8 episode of Raw. DiBiase appeared again on the November 2 edition of NXT, where he was the minister for Aksana and Goldust's wedding. Later in November 2010, DiBiase made an appearance on Raw, accompanied by Irwin R. Schyster, wherein Goldust returned the stolen Million Dollar Championship to him. DiBiase immediately offered to give the newly returned title to his son Ted DiBiase Jr., but was refused. On February 21, 2011, it was announced DiBiase would induct Jim Duggan into the Hall of Fame. He appeared on the Slammy Awards episode of Raw on December 12 alongside fellow legend Mick Foley, and presented the "Holy %&@*# Move of the Year" award, which was won by Mark Henry and Big Show. On April 10, 2012, DiBiase made an appearance on Smackdown: Blast from the Past. He returned on the March 4, 2013 Old School Raw at ringside with The Prime Time Players and agreed to be their manager if they won the match against Team Hell No. DiBiase, again accompanied by IRS, appeared at the 2014 Old School Raw special, encountering Big E Langston on his way to a match and told him everybody's got a price, to which Langston smiled.

On January 22, 2018, DiBiase made an appearance during the 25th Anniversary episode of Raw in which he played Poker with The Acolytes Protection Agency.

On July 22, 2019, DiBiase "bought" the WWE 24/7 Championship from Alundra Blayze. The 26-year space between his last title victory in 1993 is reportedly the longest in WWE history. He later lost the title to Drake Maverick in a limousine on the same night.

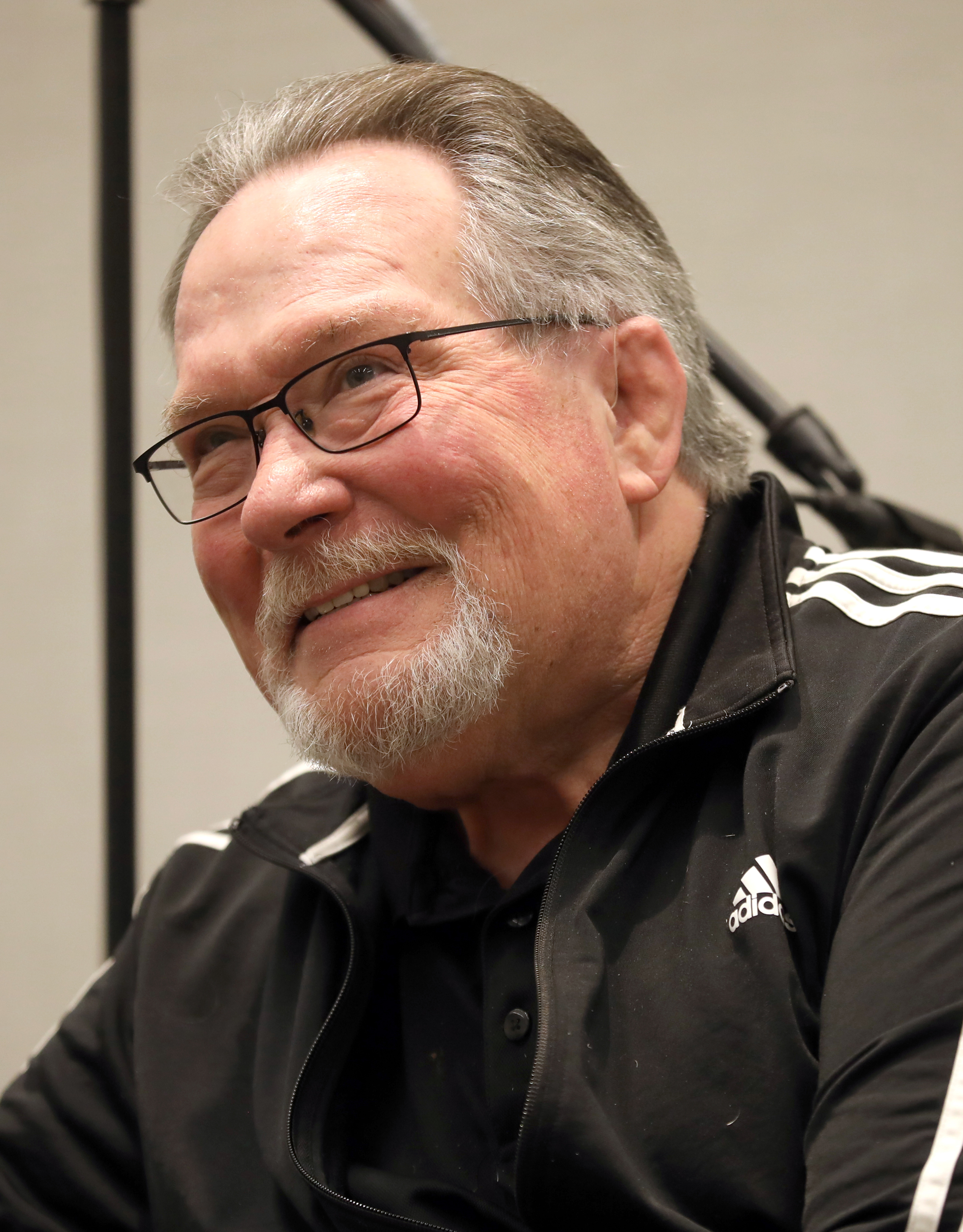
DiBiase in 2024

On the April 27, 2021, episode of NXT, DiBiase "was inside the jewelry store showing his Silver and Gold diamond watch in front of Cameron Grimes and his gold watch and made Grimes jealous. Throughout May 2021, DiBiase would continue to cost Grimes matches and outdo him during skits such as outbidding him during a house auction on May 11, and costing him a victory on May 18th, following this incident it was announced the pair would have a 'Million Dollar Faceoff' on the May 25 episode of NXT. During the showdown, Grimes was attacked by L. A. Knight, with DiBiase yelling him he's "never gonna get it" before laughing and leaving with Knight. DiBiase put the Million Dollar Championship on the line in a ladder match between Knight and Grimes at NXT TakeOver: In Your House, in which Knight was victorious. On June 15, 2021, episode of NXT, Knight turned on DiBiase and attacked him. Grimes saved DiBiase from Knight. At NXT Takeover 36 Knight would face Grimes again, If Grimes lost, DiBiase would have had to become Knight's butler. At the event, Grimes defeated Knight to become the Million Dollar Champion with the help of DiBiase. On August 24, the storyline came to a conclusion on NXT, as they talked about Grimes' journey to the title and how he was now headed "Straight to the moon!". The celebration ended with fake $100 bills with Grimes' face raining down over the Capitol Wrestling Center.

Grimes later escorted DiBiase to his limousine and handed him the Million Dollar Championship. DiBiase handed the belt back, however upon checking it, Grimes realizes he has been handed a cheap replica. DiBiase leaves after giving his signature laugh.

On January 23, 2023, Dibiase made a backstage appearance at Raw is XXX alongside Irwin R. Schyster.

== Christian ministry ==
DiBiase is now a Christian minister. In 1999, he founded Heart of David Ministry and travels the world ministering to churches, camps and conferences including Promise Keepers and Youth of the Nation. Ted is also the author of Every Man Has His Price, a part-autobiography and part-Christian testimony. In 2016, he revealed that he speaks at around 35 churches, conferences, seminars and workshops annually. He also makes additional speaking appearances at prisons, schools and rehabilitation centers.

== Welfare fraud accusations ==
In February 2020, it was reported that DiBiase's ministry received more than $2.1 million in welfare funds from the state of Mississippi after his son, Brett, was hired as deputy administrator of the state's Department of Human Services. His son, Brett, pleaded guilty to creating fraudulent statements in what has been labeled as Mississippi's largest public embezzlement case in state history. In October 2021, a court ordered Ted DiBiase Sr. to pay $722,299 of the misappropriated funds given to his Heart of David Ministries. In May 2022, the Mississippi Department of Human Services sued DiBiase, his sons, and retired NFL quarterback Brett Favre, and several others to recover more than $20 million in money "squandered" from the Temporary Assistance for Needy Families anti-poverty program.

In April 2022, the Mississippi Office of State Auditor reported that DiBiase personally received a $250,000 check from the Family Resource Center, a Mississippi welfare grantee, to "provide services as a Motivational Speaker." DiBiase forwarded an email from the welfare grantee to his sons, Ted DiBiase Jr. and Brett DiBiase, stating: "Look what I got today!". DiBiase says his famous name made his family a target for federal investigators. "We're caught in the middle of it. If I didn't have a celebrity name they wouldn't even be looking at me."

Opening statements began on January 7, 2026, in the federal trial against DiBiase. He is accused of misusing federal welfare funds intended for low-income families in Mississippi. The charges were first made public in 2023.

== Personal life ==
DiBiase got married at the age of nineteen to Jaynet Foreman (February 4, 1953) on Friday December 21, 1973 in a Roman Catholic church in Canyon. Their wedding was small. He became a father at the age of twenty three on September 10, 1977, when their first son Mike was born in Amarillo, Texas, U.S. and Jaynet became a mother at the age of twenty four. He married Melanie on December 31, 1981, and their two sons Ted Jr. and Brett was born on November 8, 1982, and March 16, 1988. Dibiase's three sons are former professional wrestlers.

DiBiase went to West Texas State University, where he was a member of Alpha Tau Omega. Junkyard Dog was the best man at Ted DiBiase's wedding

In a 2016 interview with ESPN.com, DiBiase revealed that he and Virgil had a falling out over Virgil trying to book himself and DiBiase on independent wrestling shows without DiBiase's knowledge. DiBiase stated that Virgil does not represent him for bookings.

In June 2023, DiBiase admitted that he is suffering from a severe brain trauma in his Everybody's Got A Pod podcast.

== Other media ==
In 2011, DiBiase made an appearance of on Tosh.0 during their wrestling themed episode.

Since 2023, DiBiase has hosted his own podcast the Everybody's Got a Pod alongside co-host Marcus DeAngelo.

On July 28, 2024, DiBiase was the subject in an episode of Biography: WWE Legends.

==== Documentaries ====
- Wrestling with Faith is a documentary film about Ted DiBiase. It went into production in February 2010.
- The Price of Fame is a documentary film directed by Peter Ferriero and executive produced by Ferriero, Ted DiBiase Jr. & Engage Media Partners. The film features Ted DiBiase Jr. following his father's story of redemption and faith. It was released on November 7, 2017, in 650 theaters through Fathom Events. The film was released on DVD and digitally on April 10, 2018.
- Nine Legends is a documentary in which Ted DiBiase is profiled as one of the nine wrestling or boxing legends.

==== Video game appearances ====
Year	Game	Note
1987	MicroLeague Wrestling	Video game debut
1989	WWF WrestleMaina	
1991	WWF WrestleFest	
2001	Legends of Wrestling	
2002	Legends of Wrestling II	
2003	WWE SmackDown Here Comes the Pain	
2004	Show down Legends of Wrestling	
2005	Smackdown! vs. Raw 2006	
2009	WWE Legends of WrestleMaina	
2009	Smackdown! vs. Raw 2010	
2011	WWE All Stars	
2013	WWE 2K14	
2014	WWE SuperCard	
2015	WWE 2K16	
2016	WWE 2K17	
2017	WWE 2K18	
2018	WWE 2K19	
2019	WWE 2K20	
2022	WWE 2K22	
2023	WWE 2K23	
2024	WWE 2K24	

== Bibliography ==
- DiBiase, Ted. Every Man Has His Price. Multnomah Publishers. 1997. ISBN 1-57673-175-8
- DiBiase, Ted. The Million Dollar Man. Pocket Books. 2008. ISBN 978-1-4165-5890-3
- DiBiase, Ted (Foreword). Bruce, William J., III. Penholder. Queensbridge Publishing. 2010. ISBN 978-0-9813183-1-8

== Championships and accomplishments ==
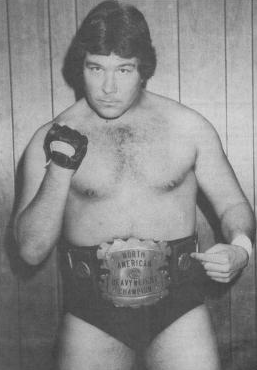
DiBiase is a four-time Mid-South North American Heavyweight Champion.

- All Japan Pro Wrestling
  - NWA United National Championship (1 time)
  - PWF World Tag Team Championship (2 times) – with Stan Hansen
  - World Tag Team Championship (1 time) – with Stan Hansen
  - World's Strongest Tag Determination League (1985) – with Stan Hansen
  - Champion Carnival Technique Award (1980)
  - Champion Carnival Outstanding Performance Award (1982)
- Cauliflower Alley Club
  - Iron Mike Mazurki Award (2010)
- Central States Wrestling
  - NWA Central States Heavyweight Championship (2 times)
- Dutch Pro Wrestling
  - Dutch Heavyweight Championship (1 time)
- Georgia Championship Wrestling
  - NWA National Heavyweight Championship (2 times)
  - NWA National Tag Team Championship (2 times) – with Stan Frazier (1), and Steve Olsonoski (1)
- George Tragos/Lou Thesz Professional Wrestling Hall of Fame
  - Class of 2007

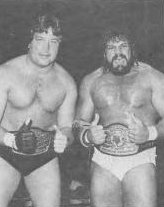
DiBiase (left) and Steve Williams as Mid-South Tag Team champions, c. 1986

- NWA Tri-State/Mid-South Wrestling Association
  - Mid-South North American Heavyweight Championship (4 times)
  - NWA North American Heavyweight Championship (Tri-State version) (1 time)
  - NWA United States Tag Team Championship (Tri-State version) (1 time) – with Dick Murdoch
  - Mid-South Tag Team Championship (6 times) – with Paul Orndorff (1), Matt Borne (1), Jerry Stubbs (1), Hercules Hernandez (1), and Steve Williams (2)
- NWA Western States Sports
  - NWA Western States Tag Team Championship (2 times) – with Ervin Smith (1) and Tito Santana (1)
- Pro Wrestling Illustrated
  - Most Hated Wrestler of the Year (1982)
  - Ranked No. 17 of the top 500 singles wrestlers in the PWI 500 in 1991
  - Ranked No. 32 of the top 500 singles wrestlers of the "PWI Years" in 2003
  - Ranked No. 20, No. 24, and No. 61 of the top 100 tag teams of the PWI Years with Steve Williams, Stan Hansen, and Irwin R. Schyster, respectively, in 2003
- Professional Wrestling Hall of Fame
  - Class of 2007
- St. Louis Wrestling Club
  - NWA Missouri Heavyweight Championship (2 times)
  - St. Louis Wrestling Hall of Fame (2014)
- Texas All-Star Wrestling
  - TASW Heavyweight Championship (1 time)
- World Wrestling Federation/World Wrestling Entertainment/WWE
  - WWF Heavyweight Championship (1 time, unrecognized) (Note: DiBiase was handed the belt by new champion André the Giant, but WWF President Jack Tunney refused to recognize DiBiase's reign and declared the title vacant. However, in the subsequent days, DiBiase defended the title once against Bam Bam Bigelow at a February 8, 1988 house show. WWE does not officially recognize DiBiase's reign as champion.)
  - Million Dollar Championship (2 times, inaugural)
  - WWF North American Heavyweight Championship (1 time)
  - WWE 24/7 Championship (1 time)
  - WWF Tag Team Championship (3 times) – with Irwin R. Schyster
  - King of the Ring (1988)
  - WWE Hall of Fame (Class of 2010)
  - Slammy Award (2 times)
    - Humanitarian of the Year (1987)
    - Best Manager (1994)
- Wrestling Observer Newsletter
  - Best Gimmick (1987)
  - Best Heel (1987, 1988)
  - Best Technical Wrestler (1979–1981)
  - Feud of the Year (1982) vs. Junkyard Dog
  - Feud of the Year (1985) vs. Jim Duggan
  - Best Gimmick (1996) – nWo
  - Feud of the Year (1996) New World Order vs. World Championship Wrestling
  - Wrestling Observer Newsletter Hall of Fame (Class of 1996)
  - Nebraska Pro Wrestling Hall of Fame (2019)
